= Russian nobility =

Upper class in Russian society before 1917

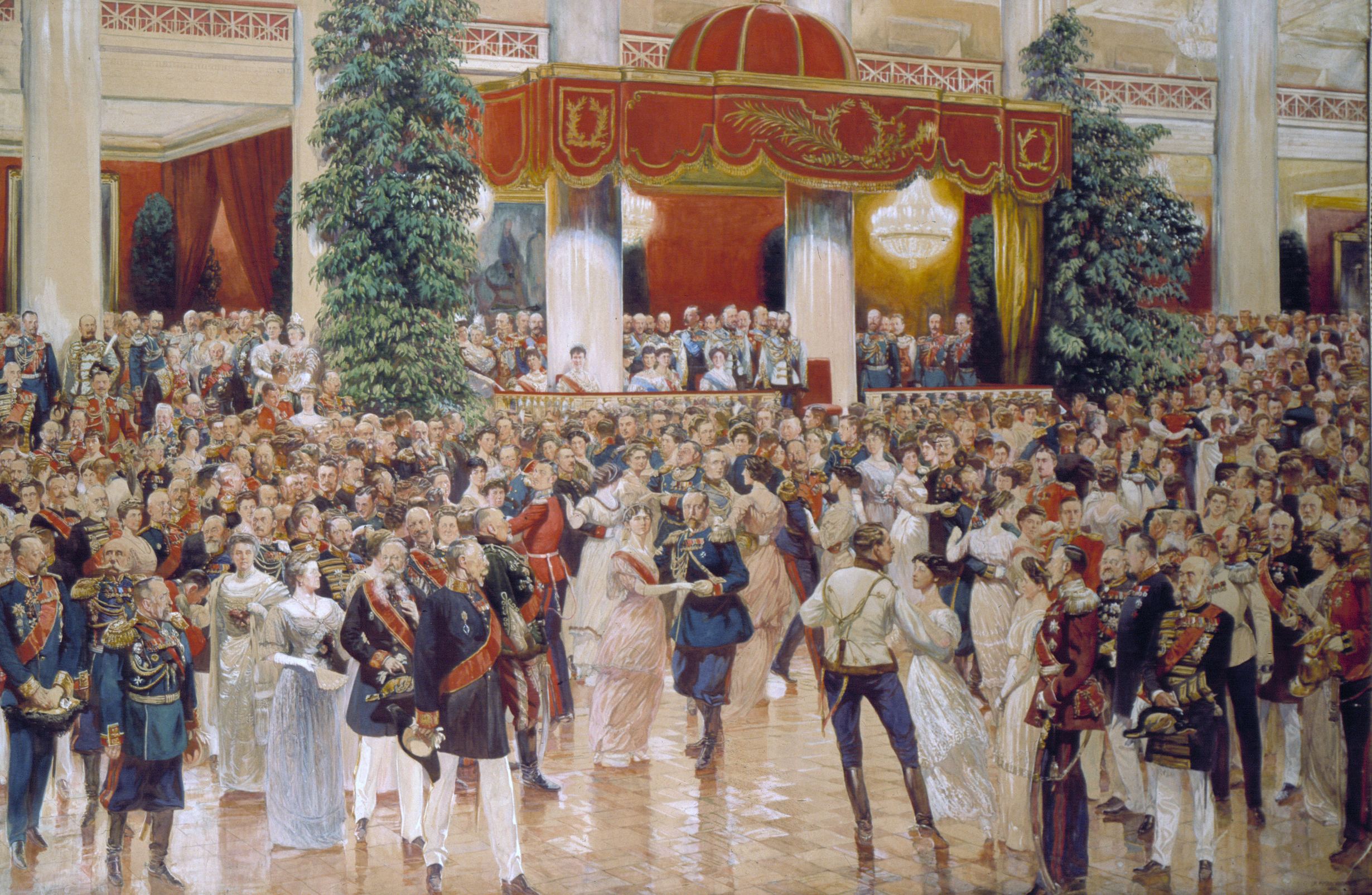
An assembly of nobility in 1913

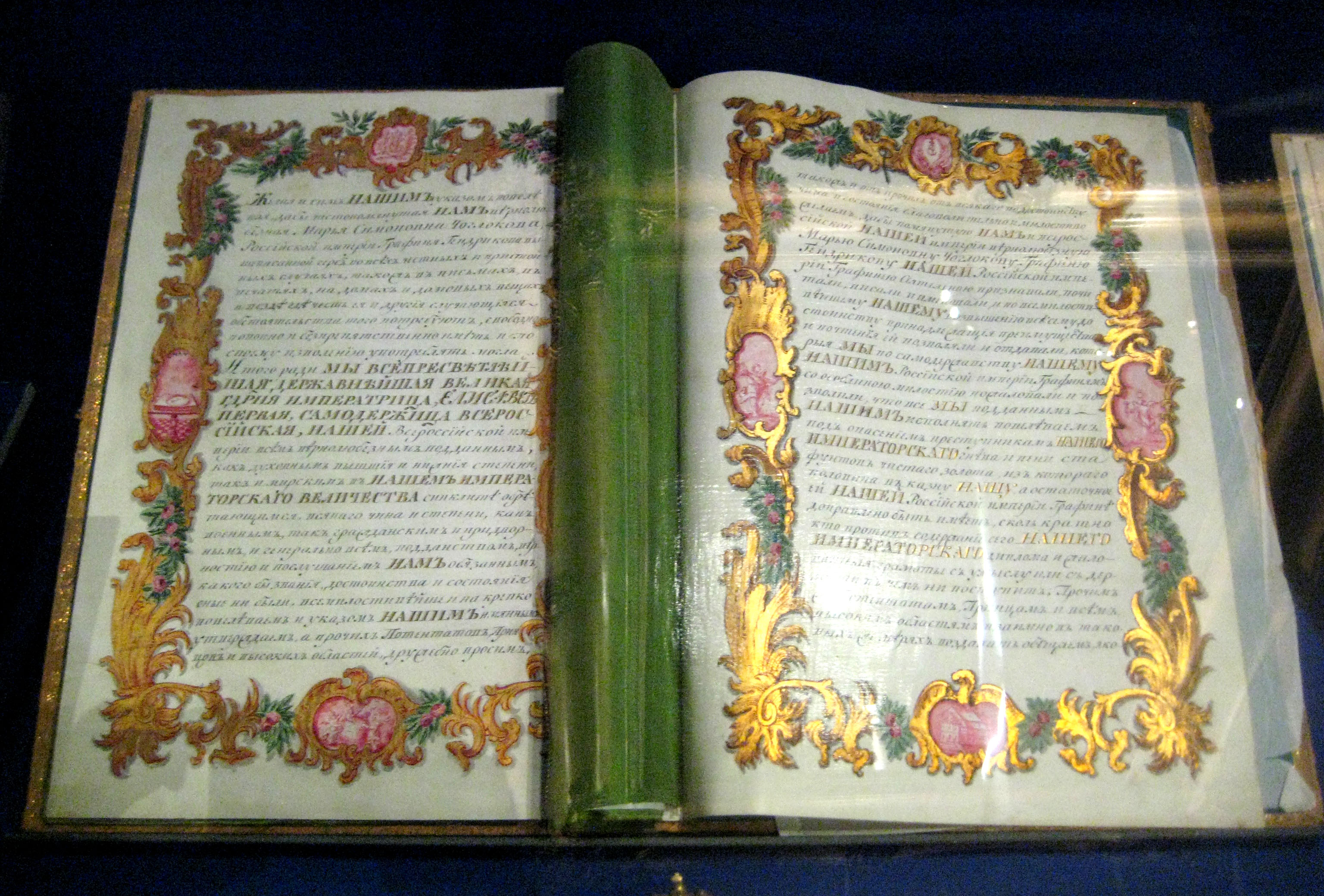
Maria Gendrikova's comital charter of 1742

The Russian nobility or dvoryanstvo (Russian: дворянство) arose in the Middle Ages. In 1914, it consisted of approximately 1,900,000 members, out of a total population of 138,200,000 (1.38% of the population). Up until the February Revolution of 1917, the Russian noble estates staffed most of the Russian government and possessed a self-governing body, the Assembly of the Nobility.

The Russian word for nobility, dvoryanstvo derives from Slavonic dvor (двор), meaning the court of a prince or duke (knyaz), and later, of the tsar or emperor. This sense of dvor originally referred to servants at the estate of an aristocrat. In the late 16th and early 17th centuries, the dvor hierarchy developed a system of seniority known as mestnichestvo. The word dvoryane ("those of the court", singular dvoryanin) described the highest rank of gentry, who performed duties at the royal court, lived in it (Moskovskie zhiltsy, "Moscow dwellers"), or were candidates to it, as for many boyar scions (dvorovye deti boyarskie, vybornye deti boyarskie). Pre-Soviet Russia shared with other countries the concept that nobility connotes a status or social category rather than a title. Throughout the 18th and 19th centuries, the title of the nobleman in Russia gradually became a formal status, rather than a reference to a member of the aristocracy, due to a massive influx of commoners via the Table of ranks.

Many descendants of the former ancient Russian aristocracy, including royalty, saw their formal standing change to merchants, burghers, or even peasants, while people descended from serfs (like Ilya Ulyanov) or clergy (like in the ancestry of actress Lyubov Orlova) gained formal nobility.

== History ==
=== Middle Ages ===
The nobility arose in the 12th and 13th centuries as the lowest part of the feudal military class, which comprised the court of a prince or an important boyar. From the 14th century land ownership by nobles increased, and by the 17th century, the bulk of feudal lords and the majority of landowners were nobles. The nobles were granted estates out of State lands in return for their service to the Tsar, either for as long as they performed service or for their lifetime. By the 18th century, these estates had become private property. They made up the Landed army (Russian: поместное войско, romanized: pomestnoe voisko)—the basic military force of Russia. Peter the Great finalized the status of the nobility, while abolishing the boyar title.

=== Early modern era in Russia: westernization ===
==== Overview ====
The adoption of the fashions, mannerisms, and ideals of Western Europe by the Russian nobility was a gradual process rooted in the strict guidelines of Peter the Great and the educational reforms of Catherine the Great. While cultural westernization was mostly superficial and restricted to court, it coincided with the efforts of Russian autocrats to link Russia to Western Europe in more fundamental ways – socially, economically and politically. However, Russia's existing economic system, which lacked a sizable middle class and which relied heavily on forced labor, proved an insurmountable obstacle to the development of a free market economy. Furthermore, the lower classes (an overwhelming majority of the Russian population) lived virtually isolated from the upper classes and the imperial court. Thus, most of the nobility's “western” tendencies were largely aesthetic and confined to a tiny proportion of the populace.

As different rulers ascended the throne in the 19th century, each figure brought a different attitude and approach to ruling the nobility. Yet, the cultural impact of Peter I and Catherine II was set in stone. Ironically, by introducing the nobility to political literature from Western Europe, Catherine exposed Russia's autocracy to them as archaic and illiberal. While the nobility was conservative as a whole, a liberal and radical minority remained constant throughout the 19th and early 20th centuries, resorting to violence on multiple occasions in order to challenge Russia's traditional political system (see Decembrist Revolt, Narodnaya Volya).

==== Before Peter the Great ====
Although Peter the Great is considered to be the first westernized ruler of Russia, there were, in fact, contacts between the Muscovite nobility and Western Europe before his reign. Ivan III, starting in 1472, sent numerous agents to Italy to study architecture. Both Michael Romanov (1613–1645) and his son Alexis (1645–1676) invited and sponsored European visitors – mostly military, medical, and building specialists – who came to Moscow in foreign dress, speaking foreign languages. When the boyars began to imitate the westerners in dress and hairstyle, Tsar Alexis in 1675 and then Tsar Feodor in 1680 restricted foreign fashions to distinguish between Russians and outsiders, but these were not effectively enforced until the 1690s.

==== Under Peter the Great ====
Peter the Great was, first and foremost, eager to do away with Russia's reputation as an Asiatic land and to propel his new empire onto the political stage of Western Europe. One of the many ways he hoped to achieve this was by changing the upper-class culture; he believed that forcing selected features of western fashion, education, and language onto the nobility would hasten Russia's rise to international prestige. In 1697, he began to send nobles on compulsory trips abroad to England, Holland, and Italy. While the Tsar primarily designed these expeditions for naval training, he also encouraged the noblemen to learn about the arts of the west. Furthermore, Peter prioritized sending Russian natives as opposed to foreign expatriates; he was intent on “breeding” a new nobility that conformed to western customs but represented the Slavic people as a whole. When the travelers returned to Moscow, Peter tested them on their training, insisting on further education for those whose accumulated knowledge was unsatisfactory. By 1724, he had established – for the purpose of scientific study and discovery – the Academy of Sciences, which he modeled after “the ones in Paris, London, Berlin, and other places”.

Peter's westernizing efforts became more radical after 1698 when he returned from his expedition through Europe known as the Grand Embassy. Upon arriving Peter summoned the nobility to his court and personally shaved almost every beard in the room. In 1705 he decreed a beard tax on all men of rank in Moscow and ordered certain officers to seek out noble beards and shave them on sight. He only allowed peasants, priests, and serfs to retain the ingrained and religious Russian tradition of wearing beards, which the Orthodox populace considered an essential aspect of their duty to convey the image of God. He also reformed the clothing of the nobility, replacing the long-sleeved traditional Muscovite robes with European clothing. Beginning in 1699 the tsar decreed strict dress requirements borrowing from German, Hungarian, French and British styles, fining any noblemen who failed to obey. Peter himself, who usually wore German dress and had a trimmed mustache, acted as a prime example. While the nobility universally followed Peter's fashion preferences at court, they greatly resented these styles, which they saw as blasphemous. Away from St. Petersburg, very few noblemen followed Peter's guidelines and enforcement was lax.

Peter also demanded changes in mannerisms and language among nobles. To supply Russians with a basic set of “proper” morals and habits, he ordered publication of manuals on Western etiquette. The most popular of these was The Honourable Mirror of Youth or A Guide to Social Conduct Gathered from Various Authors, a compilation of rules of conduct from numerous European sources, initially published in St. Petersburg in 1717. He also encouraged the learning of foreign languages especially French, which was the foremost political and intellectual language of Europe at the time. For the nobility, these changes felt even more forced than fashion regulations. As with clothing, there was uniform acceptance of Western mannerisms at court but general disregard for them outside of St. Petersburg. Furthermore, when Westerners visited Peter's court they found the image and personality of the courtiers to appear forced and awkward. Friedrich Christian Weber, a representative of Britain, commented in 1716 that the nobles “wear the German Dress; but it is easy to observe on many, that they have not been long used to it”.

==== Between the Greats ====
While none of the rulers in power from 1725 to 1762 focused as strongly on cultural westernization, Peter sparked a transformation that was now unstoppable. Through their education and travels, some members of the nobility began to understand the extent to which Russia lagged behind Western Europe in the complexity of their political and educational systems, their technology and economy. By 1750, the ideas of secularism, skepticism and humanism had reached sects of the elite class, providing some with a new worldview and giving Russia a taste of the Enlightenment, of which they had experienced little. While even the most educated of the nobility still supported the autocracy that upheld the feudal system on which they depended, some considered how to make it more representative and to improve the bureaucracy.

The period between Peter I and Catherine II represents gradual yet significant developments in western culture among the nobility. Empress Anna gave many privileges to the nobility. In 1730 she repealed the primogeniture law introduced by Peter the Great allowing the sub-division of estates. In 1736 the age at which nobles had to start service was raised from 15 to 20 and length of service was changed to 25 years instead of life and families with more than one son could keep one to manage the family estate. In 1726 Catherine I and in 1743 Empress Elizabeth further regulated noble dress in a Western direction. In 1755 also during Elizabeth's reign, advanced secondary schools and the University of Moscow were founded with curricula that included foreign languages, philosophy, medicine and law; the material was chiefly based on imported texts from the west. Most significantly Peter III freed the nobility from obligatory civil and military service in 1762, allowing them to pursue personal interests. While some used this liberty as an excuse to lead lavish lives of leisure, a select group became increasingly educated in Western ideas through schooling, reading, and travel. As before, these changes applied to few and represented a gradual shift in noble identity rather than a sudden or universal one. Marc Raeff in Origins of the Russian Intelligentsia has suggested this was not a noble victory but a sign the state didn't need them as much now that they had plenty of trained officials.

==== Catherine the Great ====
When Catherine II ascended the throne, she quickly made her political and philosophical opinions clear in the “Instruction” of 1767, a lengthy document which she prepared for the nobility, drawing largely from and even plagiarizing ideas from the west, especially those of Jean-Jacques Rousseau. The point she emphasized first and foremost was that Russia was a truly European state, and her reforms of the court and education reflect this belief. While Catherine was primarily preoccupied with impressing westerners (especially the philosophers, with whom she corresponded in writing), in doing so she also made significant efforts to educate the nobility and expose them to western philosophy and art. She designed an imperial court in the style of Louis XIV, entertaining the nobility with performances of western theatre and music. She encouraged the understanding of French, German, and English languages so that nobles could read classic, historical, and philosophical literature from the west. For the first time in the history of the Russian court, “intellectual pursuits became fashionable”. When foreigners visited the court, Catherine expected the noblemen and their ladies to flaunt not only their western appearance but also their ability to discuss current events in western languages.

Catherine also made specific reforms in institutional education that pushed the nobility's culture further westward. She based Russian education on that of Austria, importing German textbooks and adopting in 1786 a standardized curriculum to be taught in her newly created public schools. While many members of the lower classes were allowed into these schools, Catherine hoped that they could become educated enough to rise through the meritocratic Table of Ranks and eventually become nobles themselves. Catherine also established the Society for the Translation of Foreign Books, “to bring enlightenment to those Russians who could not read either French or German.” It is clear that, like Peter I, Catherine the Great desired to construct a new nobility, a “new race,” which would both resemble western noblemen and prove knowledgeable in discussions of modern issues. And, according to accounts from foreign visitors, the noblemen did, in fact, resemble those of Western Europe in their dress, topics of discussion, and taste in literature and performance.

She also gave away 66,000 serfs in 1762–72, 202,000 in 1773–93, and 100,000 in one day: 18 August 1795. Thus she was able to bind the nobility to herself. From 1782, a kind of uniform was introduced for civilian nobles called uniform of civilian service or simply civilian uniform. The uniform prescribed colors that depended on the territory. The uniform was required at the places of service, at the Court, and at other important public places. The privileges of the nobility were fixed and were legally codified in 1785 in the Charter to the Gentry. The Charter introduced an organization of the nobility: every province (guberniia) and district (uezd) had an Assembly of Nobility. The chair of an assembly was called Province/District Marshal of Nobility. In 1831 Nicholas I restricted the assembly votes to those with over 100 serfs, leaving 21,916 voters.

=== Late modern era ===
By 1805 the various ranks of the nobility had become confused, as reflected in War and Peace. In the era of the Napoleonic Wars, there were counts who were wealthier and more important than princes and noble families whose wealth had been dissipated partly through lack of primogeniture, partly through extravagance and due to poor estate-management. Young noblemen served in the military but did not thereby acquire new landed estates. Tolstoy reported later improvements: some nobles paid more attention to estate management, and some, like Andrey Bolkonsky, freed their serfs even before the tsar did so in 1861. Of Russia's nobles, 62.8% were szlachta from the nine western gubernii in 1858 and still 46.1% in 1897.

Serfs owned by European Russian landlords
| No. of serfs | 1777 (%) | 1859 (%) |
|---|---|---|
| +1000 | | 1.1 |
| 501–1000 | | 2 |
| 101–500 | 16 (101+) | 18 |
| 21–100 | 25 | 35.1 |
| <20 | 59 | 43.8 |

Obrok or cash rent was most common in the north while barshchina or labor rent was found mainly in the southern Black Earth Region. In the reign of Nicholas I (1825–1855) the latter brought three times the income of cash rent (though this needed less administration). In 1798 Ukrainian landlords were banned from selling serfs separately from land. In 1841 landless nobles were banned also.

Descended from the gentry, the landholding, but not serf-owning, odnodvortsy were between peasants and nobles. They emerged as frontier settlers recruited from the class of boyar scions. The status of the odnodvortsy changed gradually from singleholding farmers to taxed state peasants.

The nobility was too weak to oppose the Emancipation reform of 1861. In 1858, three million serfs were held by 1,400 landlords (1.4%) while 2 million by 79,000 (78%). In 1820 a fifth of the serfs were mortgaged, half by 1842. By 1859, a third of nobles' estates and two-thirds of their serfs were mortgaged to noble banks or to the state. The nobility was also weakened by the scattering of their estates, lack of primogeniture and the high turnover and mobility from estate to estate.

| Year | % nobles in landowner families |
|---|---|
| 1861 | 80 |
| 1877 | 72 |
| 1895 | 55 |
| 1905 | 39 |
| 1912 | 36 |

After the peasant reform of 1861 the economic position of the nobility weakened. The influence of the nobility was further reduced by the new law statutes of 1864, which repealed their right of electing law officer. The reform of the police in 1862 limited the landowners' authority locally, and the establishment of all-estate Zemstvo local government did away with the exclusive influence of nobility in local self-government.

These changes occurred despite the nobles keeping nearly all the meadows and forests and having their debts paid by the state, while the ex-serfs paid 34% over the market price for the shrunken plots they kept. This figure was 90% in the northern regions, 20% in the black-earth region but zero in the Polish provinces. In 1857, 6.79% of serfs were domestic, landless servants who stayed landless after 1861. Only Polish and Romanian domestic serfs got land. Ninety percent of the serfs who got larger plots lived in the eight ex-Polish provinces where the Tsar wanted to weaken the Szlachta. The other 10% lived in Astrakhan and in the barren north. In the whole Empire, peasant land declined 4.1% - 13.3% outside the ex-Polish zone and 23.3% in the 16 black-earth provinces. Georgia's serfs suffered the loss of 1/5 of their land in Tiflis province, 1/3 in Kutaisi province. These redemption payments were not abolished till January 1, 1907.

The influx of New World grain caused a slump in grain prices, forcing the peasants to farm more land. At the same time, despite their efficiency, large peasant households split up (from 9.5 to 6.8 persons per household in central Russia, 1861–1884). The resulting land hunger increased prices 7-fold and made it easier for nobles to sell or rent land rather than farm it themselves. From 1861 to 1900 40% of noble land was sold to peasants (70% of this went to the Commune and by 1900 two thirds of the nobles' arable land was rented to the peasantry). Between 1900 and 1914, over 20% of remaining noble land was sold but only 3% of the 155 estates over 50,000 destiny. According to the 1897 census, 71% of the top 4 ranks of the civil service were nobles. But in the civil service as a whole, noble membership declined from 49.8% in 1755 to 43.7% in the 1850s and to 30.7% in 1897. There were 1.2 million nobles, about 1% of the population (8% in Poland; compare with 4% in Hungary and 1 to 1.5% in France). Their military influence waned: in the Crimean War 90% of officers were noble, by 1913 the proportion had sunk to 50%. They lived increasingly away from their estates: in 1858 only 15 to 20% of Russian nobles lived in cities, by 1897 it was 47.2%.

| Year | % 1861 noble land still in their control |
|---|---|
| 1867 | 96.3 |
| 1872 | 92.6 |
| 1877 | 88.4 |
| 1882 | 81.7 |
| 1887 | 76.7 |
| 1892 | 72.4 |
| 1897 | 67.1 |
| 1902 | 61 |
| 1905 | 58.8 |
| 1909 | 52.3 |
| 1913 | 47.6 |
| 1914 | 47.1 |

By 1904 1/3 of noble land was mortgaged to the noble bank. During the 1905 Russian Revolution 3,000 manors were burnt (15% of the total).

| Year | Noble land (desiatinas) |
|---|---|
| 1861 | 105,000,000 |
| 1877 | 73,077,000 |
| 1905 | 52,104,000 |

==== Non-Russian nobility ====
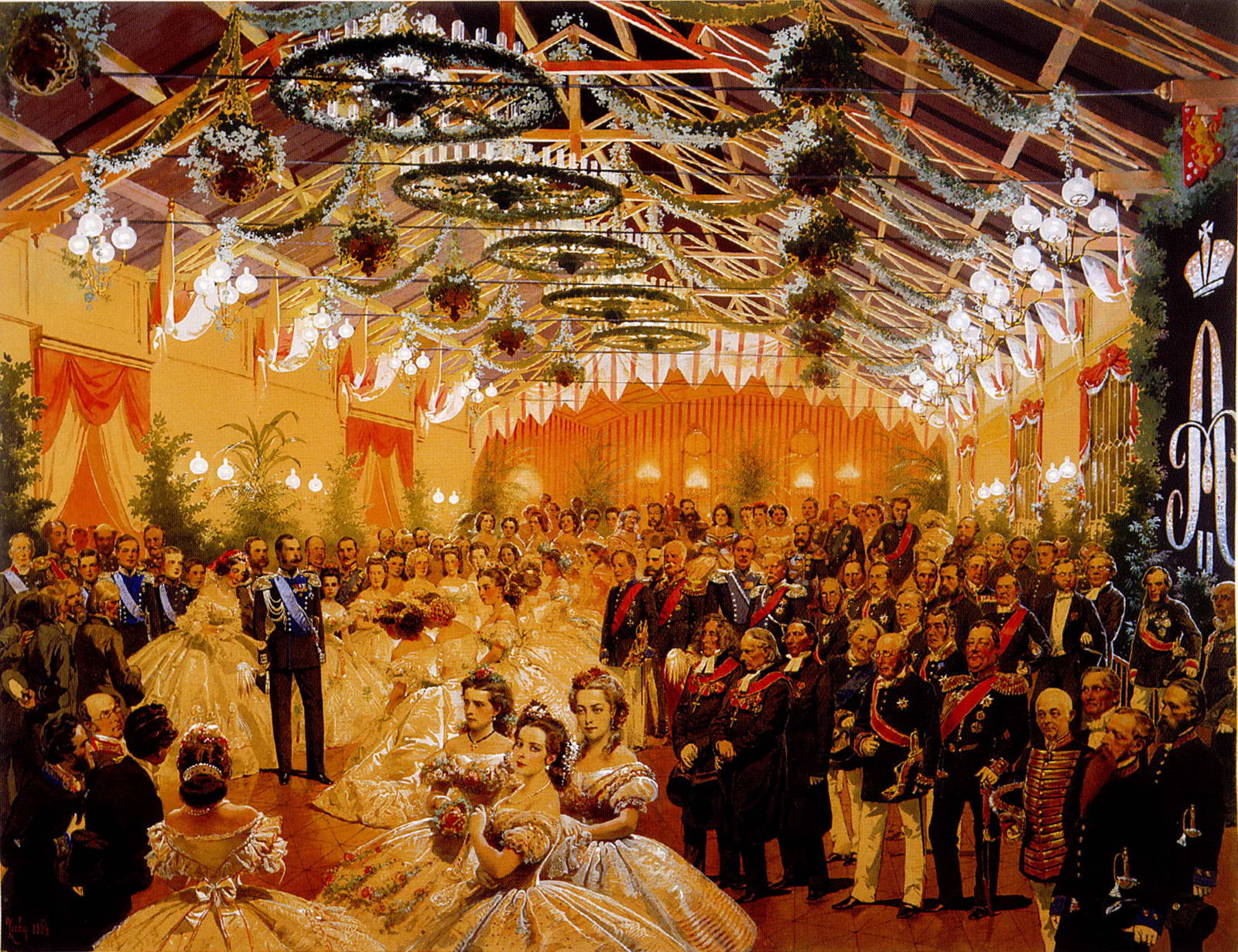
Grand ball in honour of Grand Duke of Finland Alexander II in 1863 in Helsinki, Finland.

The Russian Empire's nobility was multi-ethnic. Native non-Russians, including Poles, Georgians, Lithuanians, Tatars, and Germans, played a significant role within the noble class. The Baltic German nobility, in particular, held considerable prominence. By 1795, after the Russian authorities had reduced the number of Polish nobles through administrative measures, Polish nobility made up 66% of the Empire's noble estate. According to the 1897 census, hereditary nobles accounted for 0.87% of Russians, compared to 5.29% of Georgians and 4.41% of Poles, however Russians had one of the highest shares of non-inheritable noble titles.

The Russian economy was based on agriculture. The abolition of serfdom in Russia - except in Finland, where serfdom did not exist - transformed the economic landscape and led to the emergence of new social classes, which affected both the Russian and non-Russian nobility. Later, many of the impoverished or déclassé Polish and Georgian nobles became leaders of nationalist and radical political movements, including Bolshevism.

Quoting historian John Armstrong, Andrei Znamenski describes the Baltic Germans as a "mobilized diaspora" who acted as the Russian Empire's cultural and diplomatic envoys.

== Abolition ==
=== Russian Revolution, Soviet Union and White émigrés ===
The nobility, members of which had played an active role in the February Revolution of 1917 and still occupied many positions in politics and state administration (e.g. Prince Georgy Lvov), was suppressed and abolished in the October Revolution by the new Soviet government run by the Bolsheviks with a decree of November 10/November 23, 1917. All classes of nobility ceased to exist as a class defined by state law.

The vast majority of wealthy and high-ranking nobles left Russia as "White émigrés" or fell victim to the Russian Civil War or the Red Terror by the Bolsheviks (Grand Duke Kirill, Grand Duchess Maria Pavlovna, Prince Felix Yusupov). Countless nobles died in the civil war after the October Revolution - in the White Army units there were entire regiments that consisted exclusively of noble officers (Sergey Markov, Mikhail Drozdovsky, Dmitry Bagration). Others emigrated, especially to Switzerland, preferably to Geneva, to Finland, Poland, Germany and France, where Paris became the center of Russian emigrants (the “princely taxi drivers” were a stereotype there in the 1920s) and from there often to the United States, where a large part of the surviving members of the Imperial Family of Russia, the House of Romanov, and their descendants live today. The Russian Orthodox Church Outside of Russia quickly developed.

Under Bolshevik rule, many nobles were persecuted, imprisoned, tortured, and shot (Grand Duke George, Nicholas and Sergei). Emperor Nicholas II and his family were banished to Yekaterinburg and murdered there. Thousands of dissidents, devout Christians, members of non-Russian peoples, communist officials and many nobles who remained in the Soviet Union later fell victim to the “purges” under Stalin. However, a significant number of the (mostly untitled) small nobility, who had inconspicuous names, had previously served as civil servants and mostly owned little land, came to terms with the circumstances. Some of them even took part in building the new state - such as Lenin himself, Foreign Minister Georgy Chicherin as well as intelligence chief Felix Dzerzhinsky and his successor Vyacheslav Menzhinsky, both of whom came from Polish noble families; also Stalin's secret service chief Vsevolod Merkulov, Marshals Mikhail Tukhachevsky and Konstantin Rokossovsky. Occasionally, members of prominent aristocratic families also adapted to the circumstances, either becoming Bolsheviks themselves, like the diplomat Leonid Leonidovich Obolensky (1873−1930), father of the actor Leonid Obolensky, or supporting the new system, like the writer Aleksey Nikolayevich Tolstoy or the actor Mikheil Gelovani. Some married into the proletariat and the next, Soviet-influenced generation was accepted into the Soviet academic elite, such as Georgy Golitsyn, Vladimir Vladimirovich Golitsyn or Andrey Gagarin.

Many members of the Russian nobility who fled Russia after the Bolshevik Revolution played a significant role in the White Emigre communities which settled in Europe, in North America, and in other parts of the world. In the 1920s and 1930s, several Russian nobility associations were established outside Russia, including groups in France (the Union de la Noblesse Russe (UNR) is a member organization of CILANE), Belgium, and the United States. In New York, the Russian Nobility Association in America, was founded in 1933.

List of notable White Emigre of Russian nobles
| Name | Settlement |
|---|---|
| Prince Serge Obolensky | United States |
| Prince Georgy Lvov | United States |
| Prince Sergei Rachmaninoff | United States |
| Grand Duchess Maria Pavlovna | United States |
| Princess Nina Georgievna of Russia | United States |
| Princess Xenia Georgievna | United States |
| Prince Felix Yusupov | France |
| Grand Duke Alexander Mikhailovich of Russia | France |
| Grand Duchess Marie Pavlovna the Elder | France |
| Princess Irina Alexandrovna of Russia | France |
| Grand Duke Nicholas Nikolaevich | France |
| Grand Duchess Xenia Alexandrovna | United Kingdom |
| Princess Marina of Greece and Denmark | United Kingdom |
| Grand Duchess Olga Alexandrovna | Canada |
| Princess Tatiana Konstantinovna | Switzerland |
| Prince Rostislav Alexandrovich | Switzerland |
| Grand Duchess Anastasia Mikhailovna | Switzerland |
| Prince Michael Andreevich of Russia | Australia |
| Prince Roman Petrovich of Russia | Italy |

=== Russian nobility since 1991 ===
The number of descendants of noble families still living in Russia today is difficult to estimate after more than 70 years of communism, but with around 100 million inhabitants in 1917 it could be at least 50–60,000. While most of the descendants of the princely and comital houses have lived in western countries since the revolution, many members of lower-ranking families have remained in Russia.

After the Dissolution of the Soviet Union in 1991, aristocratic associations and organizations that maintained noble traditions were permitted again in Russia, but the Russian nobility no longer exists as a social class. The historical noble families are known from the sources. However, in Russia, as everywhere in Europe, according to historical aristocratic law, the nobility was only passed on in the male line. The acceptance of descendants through the female line, which is contrary to tradition and is now practiced by some of the more recent associations, is therefore very controversial.

The various aristocratic associations have different opinions not only with regard to aristocratic law, but also with regard to the succession of the pretenders to the Russian tsar's crown. Some see Grand Duchess Maria Vladimirovna of Russia as the legitimate heir to the throne, but she is not recognized by the other remaining branches of the Romanov family. In particular, she has come to terms with the new Russian elite around President Vladimir Putin and awards some historical dynastic orders of the Tsars and sometimes even newly created orders such as the Order of the Archangel Michael (founded in 1988) or the Ladies' Order of Saint Anastasia (founded in 2010) to their members. She even goes so far as to raise such people “to the nobility.” In 2007, she is said to have ennobled the former head of the Russian domestic secret service Federal Security Service (FSB), Nikolai Patrushev, who is considered one of Vladimir Putin's closest confidants (and one of his possible successor candidates). Patrushev himself described the FSB employees in an interview as “our new nobility” because of their sense of dedicated service.

The aristocratic associations are therefore faced with the question of how to deal with such “new aristocrats”, who usually have no biographical or cultural connection to the traditional nobility, but are often historically connected to the CPSU or the KGB and are often influential. Some of these associations have taken this line and recognize such “nobility” as legitimate. Most, however, reject it, because Grand Duchess Maria Vladimirovna is neither the undisputed pretender to the throne nor does she – who is not a reigning monarch – have any constitutional authority to ennoble herself. Neither the Russian CILANE member association, the Union de la Noblesse Russe based in Paris, which largely consists of descendants of the “White Emigrants”, nor the Association of Baltic knighthoods, which unites the families of the Baltic-German enrolled nobility of the former Russian Empire, recognize Maria Vladimirovna or anyone else as holder of the throne with the power of ennoblement. However, the fact that influential “would-be nobles” make up a significant proportion of the members of the new Russian aristocratic associations leads to major conflicts within and between the Russian aristocratic associations. Since membership in the nobility is neither legally recognized nor protected, a large market for fake titles and coats of arms has developed since 1991. Supposedly original letters of nobility “from the Tsarist era” or confirmation diplomas from dubious associations can even be purchased on the Internet.

== Organization ==
Portrait of Princess Leonilla Bariatinskaya, by Franz Xaver Winterhalter.

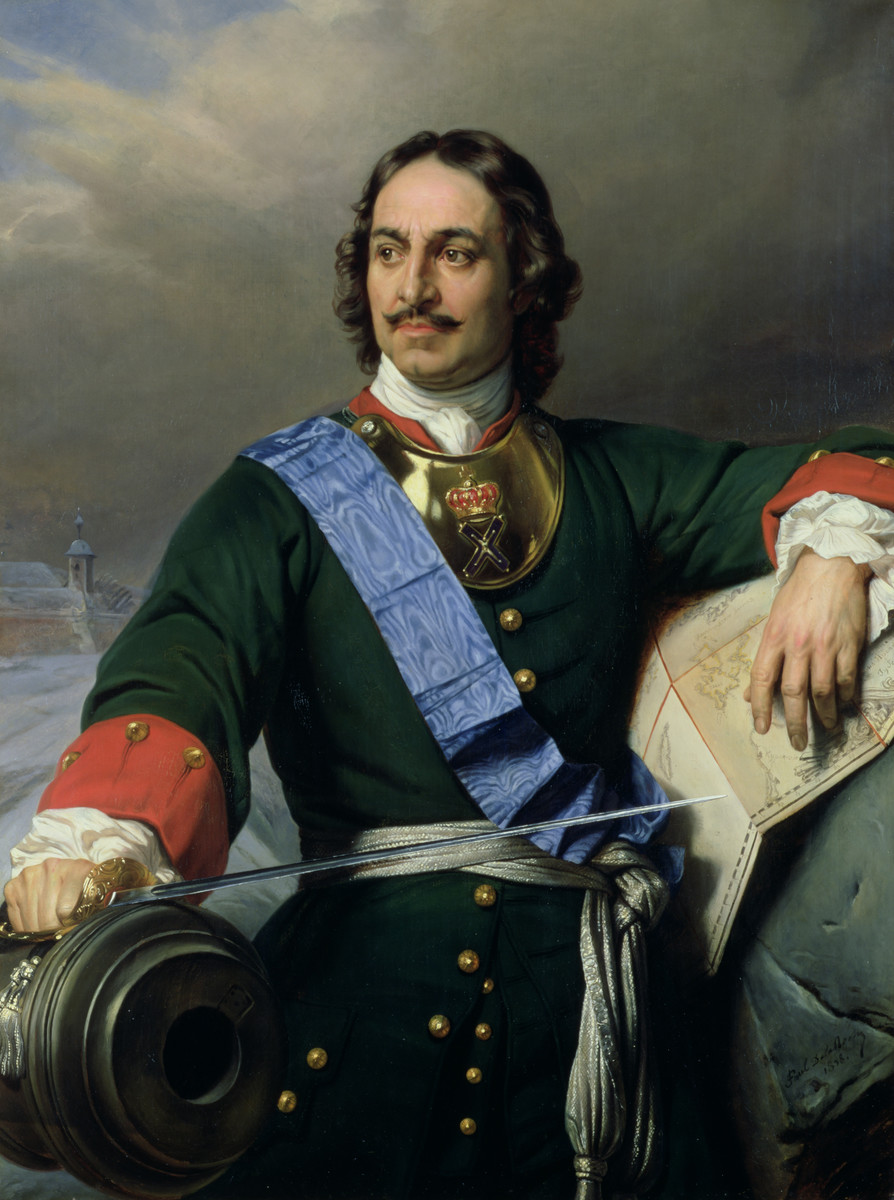
Peter the Great (1672–1725) reformed the Russian nobility.

Nobility was transferred by inheritance or was bestowed by a fount of honour, i.e. the sovereign of the Russian Empire, and was typically ranked as per below, with those of the highest noble prestige ranked first.

- Ancient nobility (descendants from Middle Ages)
- Titled nobility:
  - Prince (knyaz Князь): e.g. Prince Potemkin
  - Count (graf Граф): e.g. Count Tolstoy
  - Baron (baron Барон): e.g. Baron Pahlen
- Hereditary nobility: inherited by all legitimate male-line descendants of a nobleman
- Personal nobility: granted for the life of the recipient only
- Estateless nobility: obtained without the grant of a landed estate

Unlike the ancient nobility, which was exclusively hereditary, the remaining classes of nobility could be acquired.

A newly designated noble was usually entitled to landownership. A loss of land did not automatically mean loss of nobility. In later Imperial Russia, higher ranks of state service (see Table of Ranks) were automatically granted nobility, not necessarily associated with land ownership.

Russian did not in general employ a nobiliary particle before a surname (as von in German or de in French); however, the Russian name suffix -skij which means “of” and is equal to “von” and “de” was used in many noble surnames especially topographic surnames as nobiliary particle. Russian noblemen were accorded an official salutation, or style, that varied by rank: your high born (Russian: ваше высокородие, romanized: vashe vysokorodie), your high well born (Russian: ваше высокоблагородие, romanized: vashe vysokoblagorodie), your well born (Russian: ваше благородие, romanized: vashe blagorodie), etc.

=== Titled nobility ===
Titled nobility (Russian: титулованное дворянство) was the highest category: those who had titles such as prince, count and baron. The latter two titles were introduced by Peter the Great. A baron or count could be either proprietary (actual) (владетельный (действительный))—i.e., who owned land in the Russian Empire—or titular (титулярный), i.e., only endowed with a rank or title.

=== Hereditary nobility ===
Hereditary nobility (Russian: потомственное дворянство) was transferred to wife, children, and further direct legal descendants along the male (agnatic) line. In exceptional cases, the emperor could transfer nobility along indirect or female lines, e.g., to preserve a notable family name.

=== Personal nobility ===
Personal nobility (Russian: личное дворянство) could, for instance, be acquired by admission to orders of knighthood of the Russian Empire. It was transferable only to the wife.

=== Estateless nobility ===
Estateless nobility (Russian: беспоместное дворянство) was nobility acquired by state service, but without a grant of land.

=== Ancient nobility ===
In addition, the ancient nobility (Russian: Древнее дворянство) was recognised, descendants of Rurik, Gediminas and historical boyars and knyazes, e.g., the Aminoffs, Shuyskies, Galitzins, Naryshkins, Khilkoffs, Gorchakovs, Belosselsky-Belozerskys and Chelyadnins.

=== Privileges ===
Russian nobility possessed the following privileges:

- The right to own estates populated with estate-tied serfs (until 1861), including virtual ownership of the serfs who worked on the estates.
- Style, that varied by rank: The High Born (Russian: ваше высокородие), The High and Well Born (Russian: ваше высокоблагородие), The Well Born (Russian: ваше благородие), etc.
- Freedom from compulsory military service (1762–1874; later compulsory military service was introduced which did not exempt the nobility).
- The right to enter specially designated educational institutions, such as Tsarskoye Selo Lyceum, Imperial School of Jurisprudence and Page Corps.
- Freedom from corporal punishment.
- The right to bear and use a coat of arms, introduced by the end of the 17th century.

=== Noble titles of the Russian Empire ===
The Russian Tsardom came into being around the Grand Duchy of Moscow by the incorporation of various political entities surrounding it. After Peter the Great returned from his grand tour he implemented reforms aimed at westernization of his realm, including officially adopting the title of Emperor of All Russia, preceding the traditional Slavic title of Tsar. Peter and his successors also streamlined the stratification of the Russian nobility, adopting European-style titles such as Count and Baron and discontinuing the archaic titles of Boyars. The Russian system of noble titles evolved into its final form:

Noble titles of the Russian Empire
| Title | Crown | Application | Style of Address |
|---|---|---|---|
| Emperor of All Russia His Imperial Majesty The Sovereign, Emperor and Autocrat of All Russia (Его Императорское Величество Государь Император и Самодержец Всероссийский) | | The ruler of the Russian Empire and its constituent entities. | Your Imperial Majesty (Ваше Императорское Величество) |
| Tsesarevich His Imperial Highness The Lord Heir Tsesarevich and Grand Prince (Его Императорское Высочество Государь Наследник Цесаревич и Великий Князь) * | | Heir apparent of the Russian Empire. | Your Imperial Highness (Ваше Императорское Высочество) |
| Grand Prince His Imperial Highness The Grand Prince (Его Императорское Высочество Великий Князь) * | | Descendants of the House of Romanov. After the introduction of the title Prince of Blood Imperial, the title of Grand Prince was reserved for sons and grandsons of Romanov emperors. | Your Imperial Highness (Ваше Императорское Высочество) |
| Prince of the Blood Imperial His Highness the Prince Firstname Patronymic of the Blood Imperial (Его Высочество Князь Крови Императорской) | | Introduced by Alexander III on January 24, 1885, in order to reduce the number of members of the House of Romanov titled Grand Princes (as each Grand Prince received 200,000 rubles annually from the state budget and enjoyed other high privileges). The male-line great-grandchildren of the Romanov emperors and their male-line descendants were titled Prince of the Blood Imperial to distinguish them from those of the noble Russian families titled simply Prince. | Your Highness (Ваше Высочество) |
| Prince His Serenity The Prince (Его Сиятельство Князь) * | | List of Russian princely families | Your Serenity (Ваше Сиятельство) |
| Duke His Highness the Duke (Его Светлость Герцог) ** | | Applied to some French and German relatives of the Romanov dynasty. Also used by dukes in Russian service, which were bestowed with ducal dignity by other monarchs and therefore did not officially belong to the Russian nobility. | Your Grace (Ваша Светлость) |
| Marquis His Serenity The Marquis (Его Сиятельство Маркиз) | | Used by marquises residing in Russia and/or in Russian service, which were bestowed with marquisal dignity by other monarchs and therefore technically did not belong to the Russian nobility. | Your Serenity (Ваше Сиятельство) |
| Count His Serenity the Count (Его Сиятельство Граф) | | | Your Serenity (Ваше Сиятельство) |
| Baron The Well Born Baron (Его Благородие Барон) | | There were landed and landless barons in the Russian Empire. | The Well Born (Ваше Благородие) |
| Dvoryanin / Pomeshchik | | The lowest ranks of hereditary nobility. Dvoryanin comes from dvor (the court of a ruler or a high nobleman). Originally these were free commoners in the service of noblemen who also had serfs. Pomeshchiks were the landed gentry. | Your Well Birth (Ваше Благородие) |
| Baltic knights | | Baltic Noble Corporations of Courland, Livonia, Estonia, and Oesel (Ösel) were medieval fiefdoms formed by German nobles in the 13th century in vassalage to the Teutonic Knights or Denmark in modern Latvia and Estonia. The territories continued to have semi-autonomous status from 16th to early 20th century under Swedish and Russian rule. The dukes, princes, counts, and barons of Courlandish, Livonian, Estonian and Oesel extraction were gradually absorbed into the Russian nobility due to their services to the realm. The Russian medieval equivalent of knights (the armored boyars, the vityazes) was ultimately abolished by the reforms of Peter the Great. The ethnically German knights of Baltic extraction retained their social prominence and equalled the Russian Pomeshchiks due to their wealth and lands. | Your Well Birth (Ваше Благородие) |
* The Russian Empire used the traditional Slavic title Knyaz, usually translated as "prince" in Western European traditions.; ** Upon the death of Elizabeth of Russia, the male Romanov line was extinguished, and the Russian throne was inherited by Karl Peter Ulrich von Oldenburg, the heir apparent of the Duchy of Holstein-Gottorp. With that event, the ruling dynasty of the Russian Empire became the House of Holstein-Gottorp-Romanov, while the female-line heirs continued to refer to themselves simply as the House of Romanov. As there were some nobles with titles and estates in both the Russian and Holy Roman Empires, Russia adopted the German form Herzog or "Gertsog" (Герцог), instead of the French Duc or its English form Duke.

=== Acquisition ===
Hereditary nobility could be achieved in the following ways: 1) by Imperial grant to individuals or families; 2) by attaining a certain military or civil officer's rank while in active service; 3) by being awarded an order of chivalry of the Russian Empire.

Between 1722 and 1845 hereditary nobility was given to military officers who achieved the 14th rank of ensign, to civil servants who achieved the 8th rank of Collegiate Assessor and to any person who was awarded any order of the Russian Empire (since 1831 – except the Polish order of Virtuti Militari).

Between 1845 and 1856 hereditary nobility was given to military officers who achieved the 8th rank of major/captain 3rd rank, to civil servants who achieved the 5th rank of State Councillor and to any person who was awarded the Order of Saint George or the Order of Saint Vladimir of any class, or any order of the Russian Empire of the first class.

From 1856 to 1917 hereditary nobility was given to military officers who achieved the 6th rank of colonel/captain 1st rank, to civil servants who achieved the 4th rank of Active State Councillor and to any person who was awarded the Order of Saint George of any class or the Order of Saint Vladimir of any class (since 1900 - of the third class or higher), or any order of the Russian Empire of the first class.

Personal nobility could be acquired in the following ways: 1) by Imperial grant; 2) by attaining the 14th military rank of ensign or the 9th civil rank of Titular Councillor; 3) by being awarded the orders of the Russian Empire unless those gave hereditary nobility; except merchants (unless those were awarded between 1826 and 1832), who acquired honorary citizenship instead. Personal nobility was not inherited by children but was shared by the recipient's wife.

=== Other ranks and positions ===
- Boyar scions
- Marshal of Nobility
- Odnodvortsy
- Okolnichy
- Stolnik

== Gallery ==
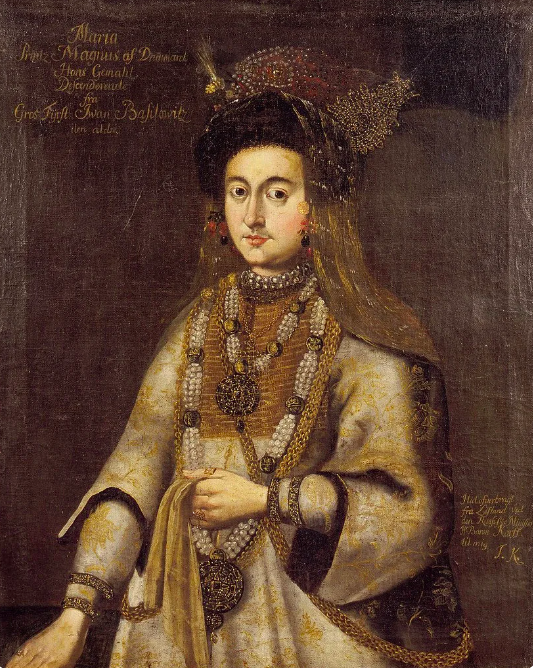
Princess Maria Staritskaya (c. 1560–1612)

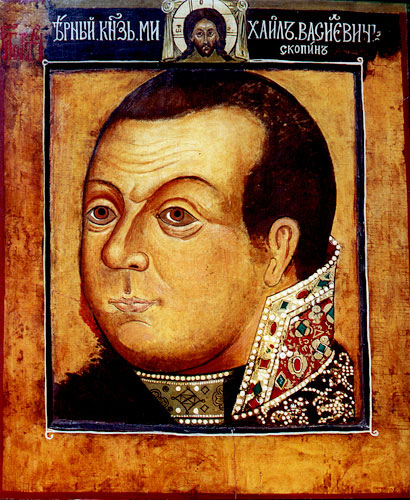
Prince Mikhail Skopin-Shuisky (1586–1610)

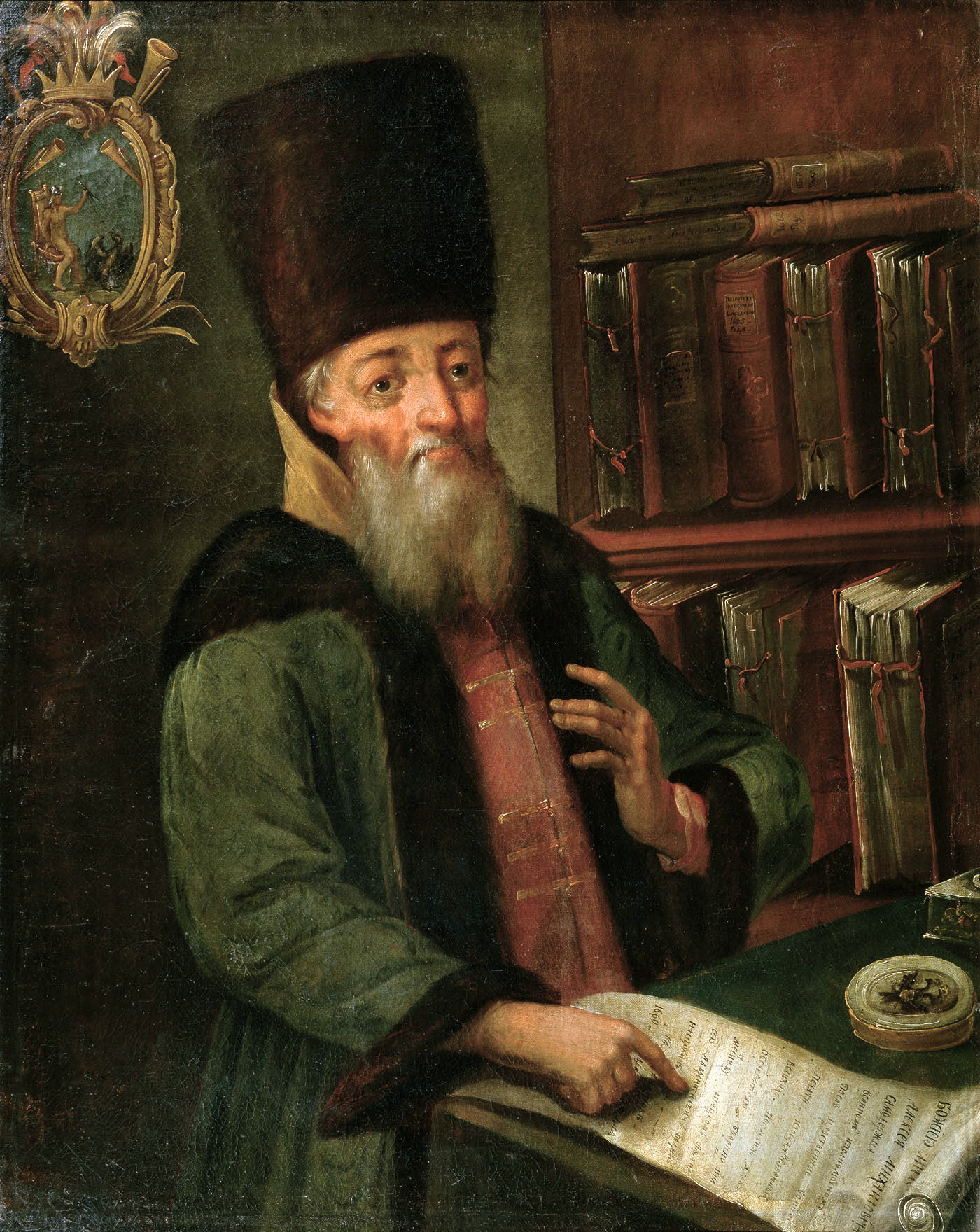
Boyar Afanasy Ordin-Nashchokin (1605–1680)

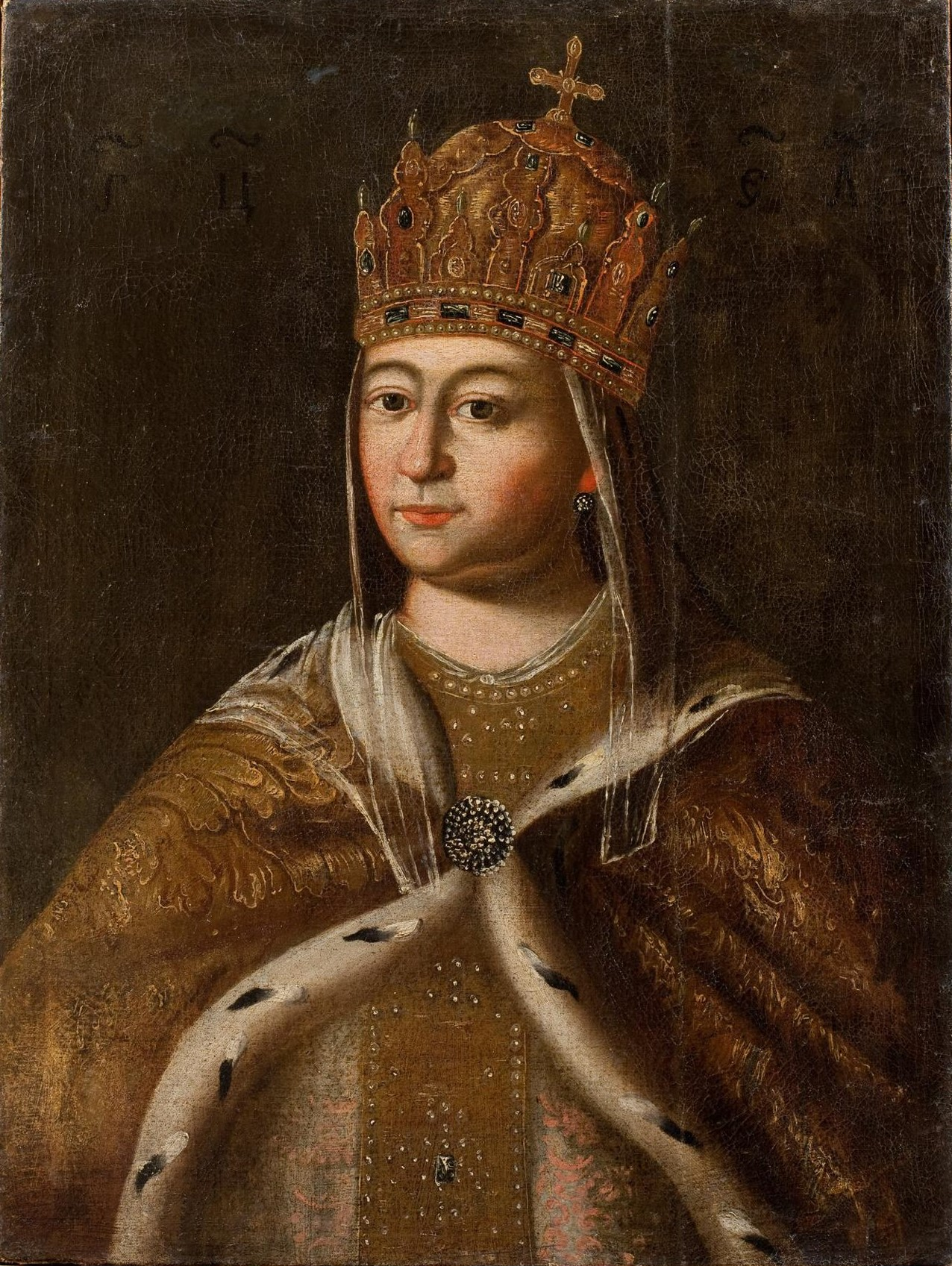
Eudoxia Streshneva (1608–1645)

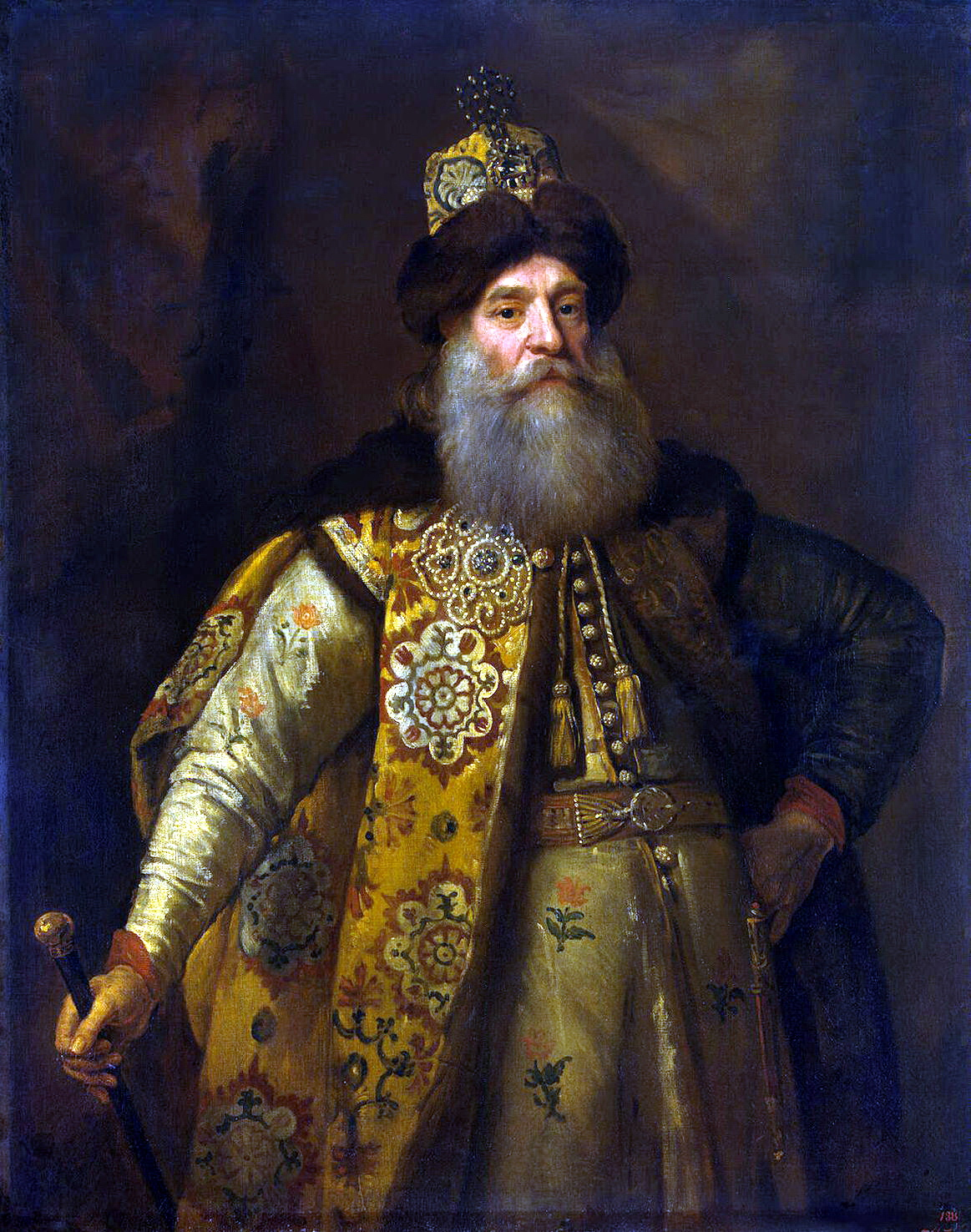
Boyar Pyotr Potemkin (1617–1700)

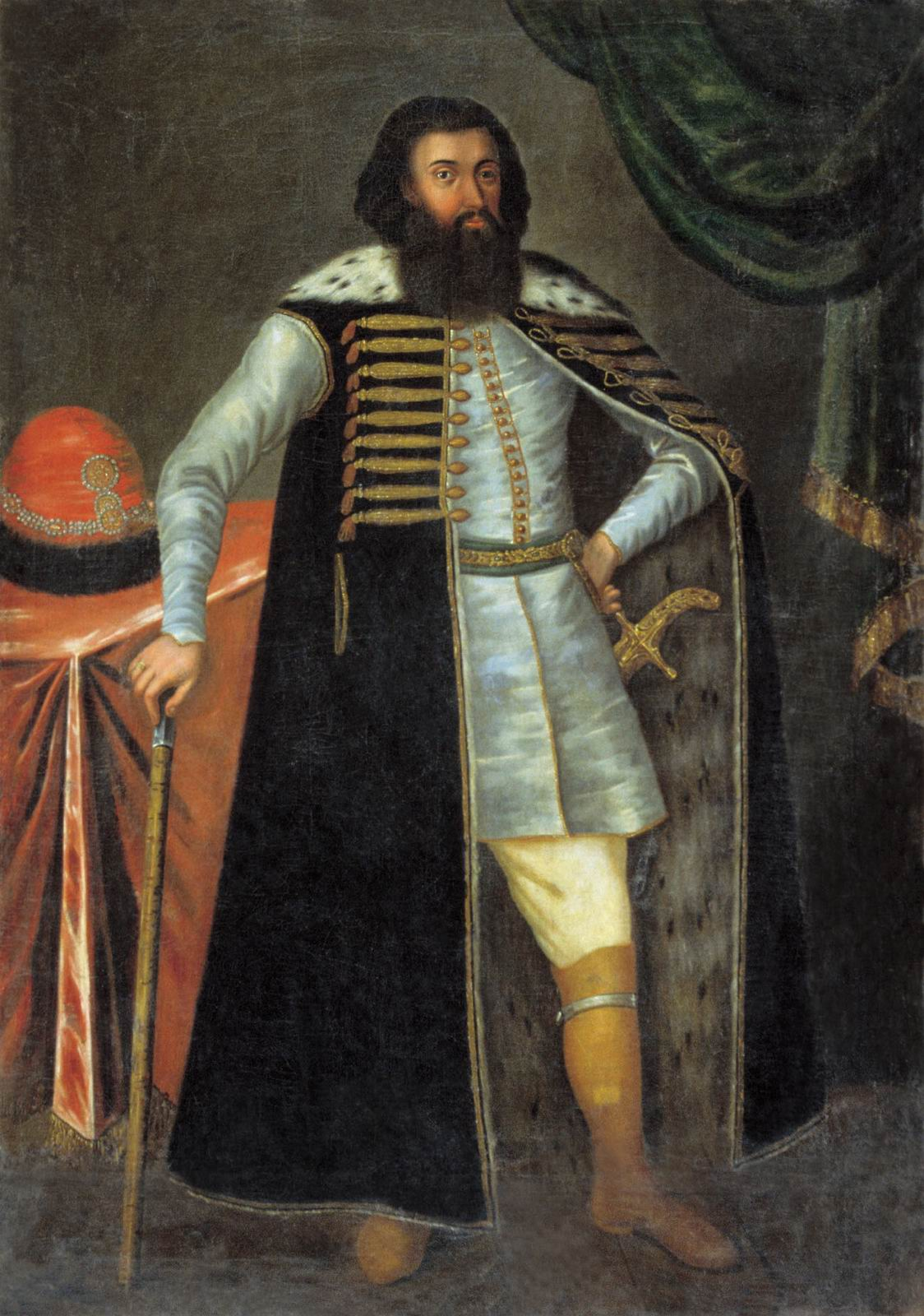
Boyar Ivan Repnin (1617–1697)

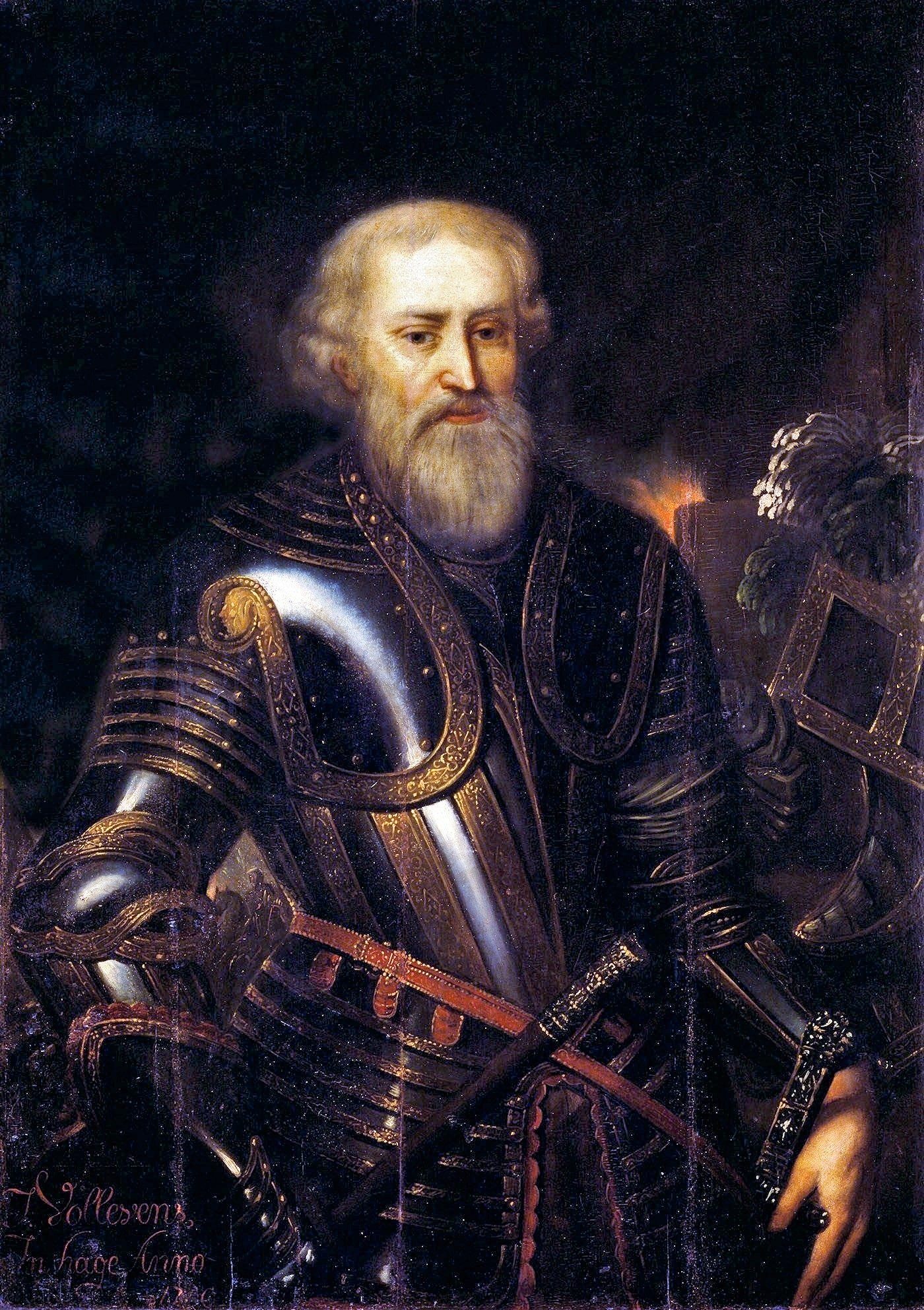
Boyar Artamon Matveyev (1625–1682)

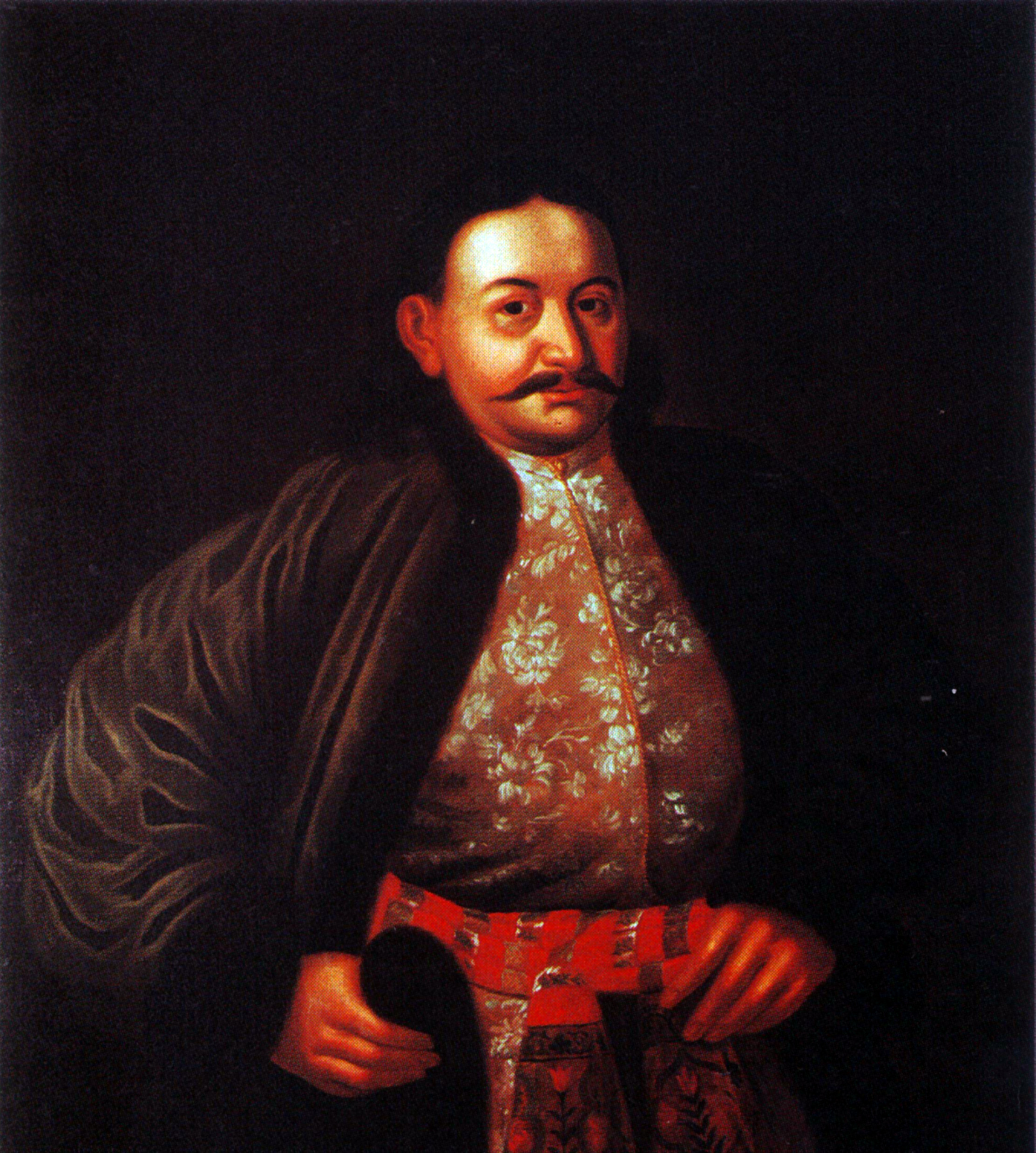
Prince Fyodor Romodanovsky (1640–1717)

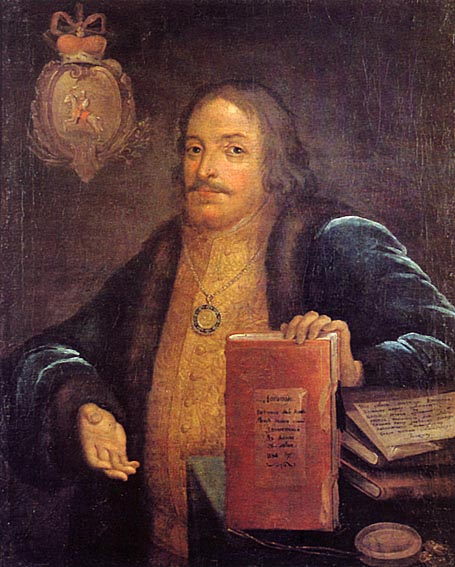
Prince Vasily Golitsyn (1643–1714)

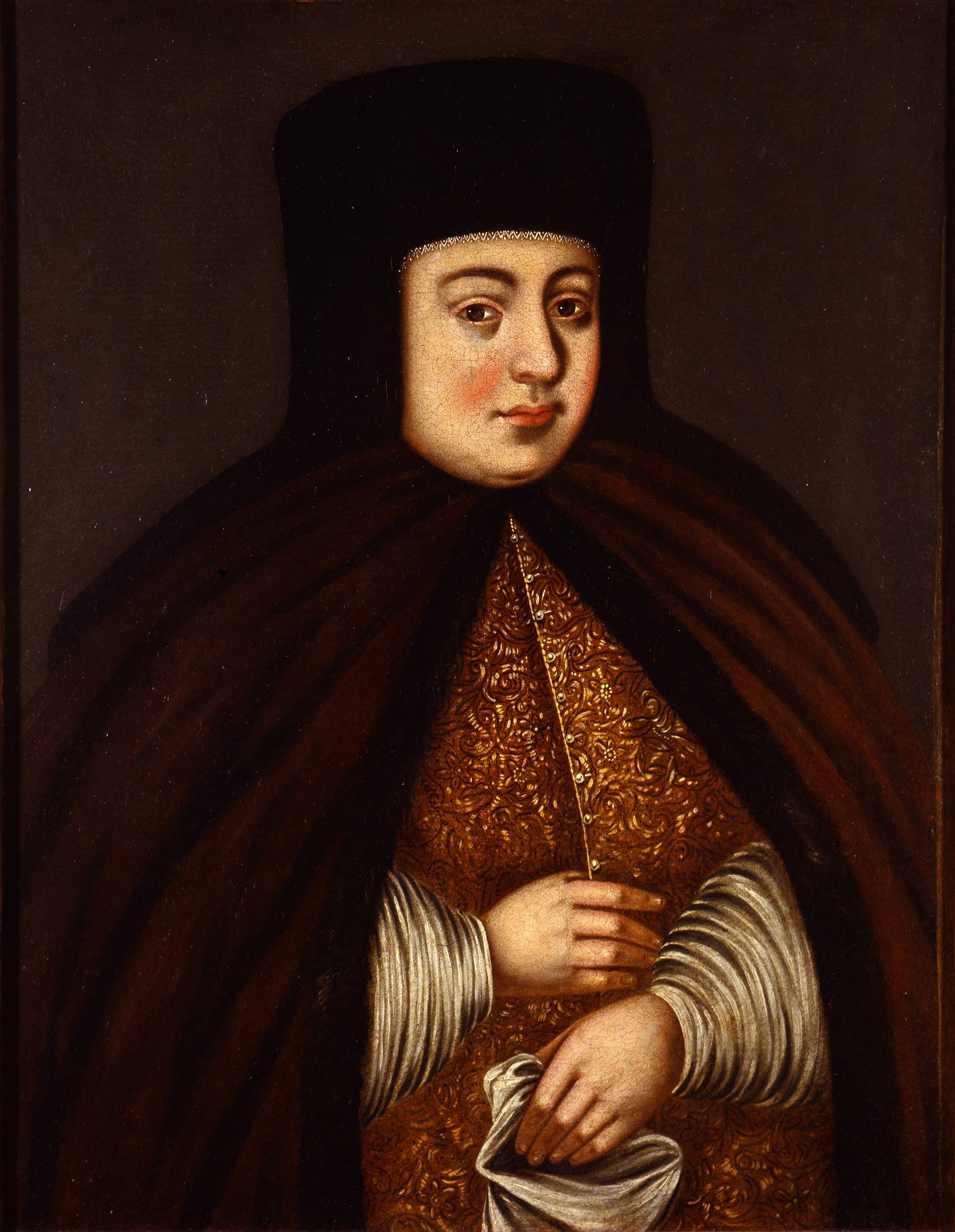
Natalya Naryshkina (1651–1694)

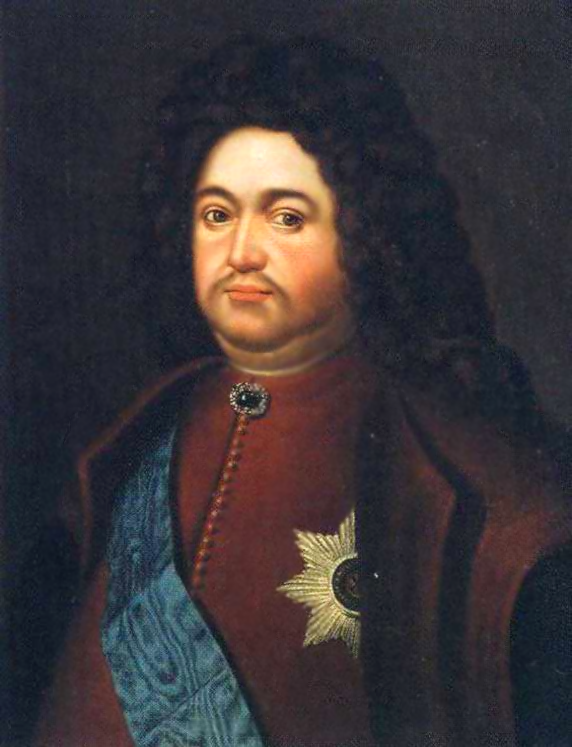
Prince Fyodor Golovin (1650–1706)

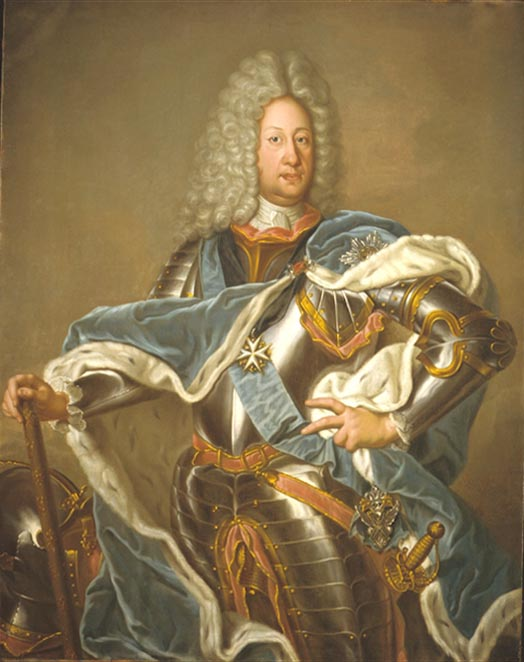
Count Boris Sheremetev (1652–1719)

Count Gavriil Golovkin (1660–1734)

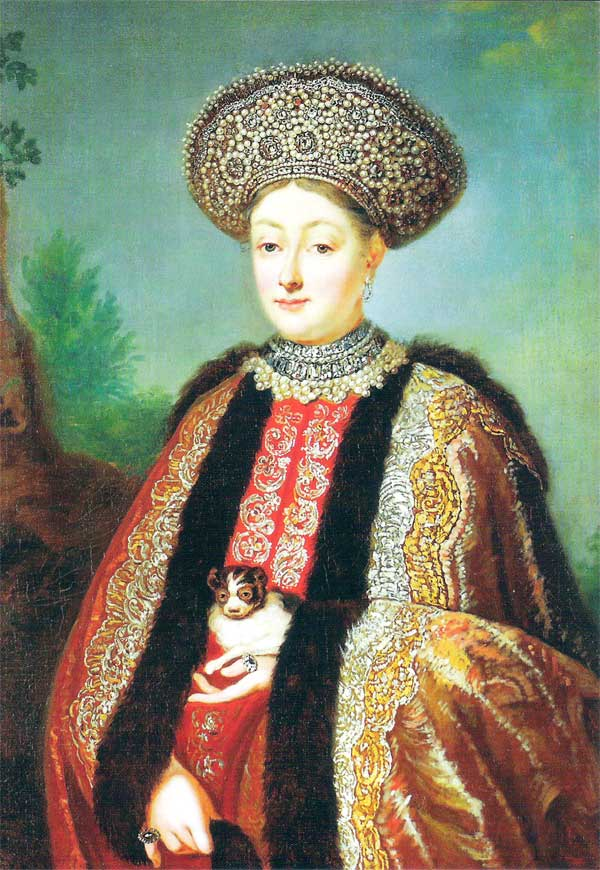
Marfa Apraksina (1664–1716)

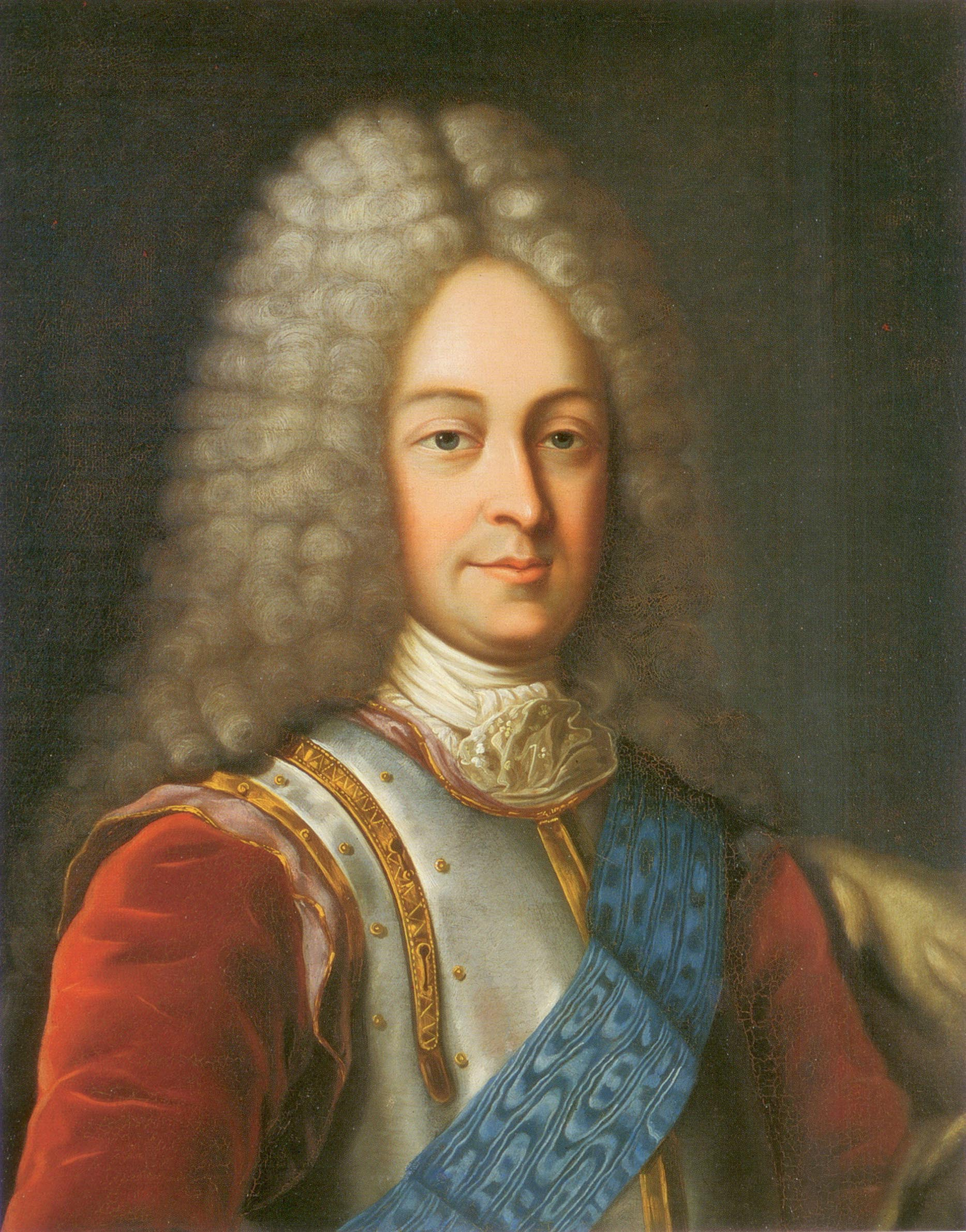
Prince Vasily Dolgorukov (1672–1739)

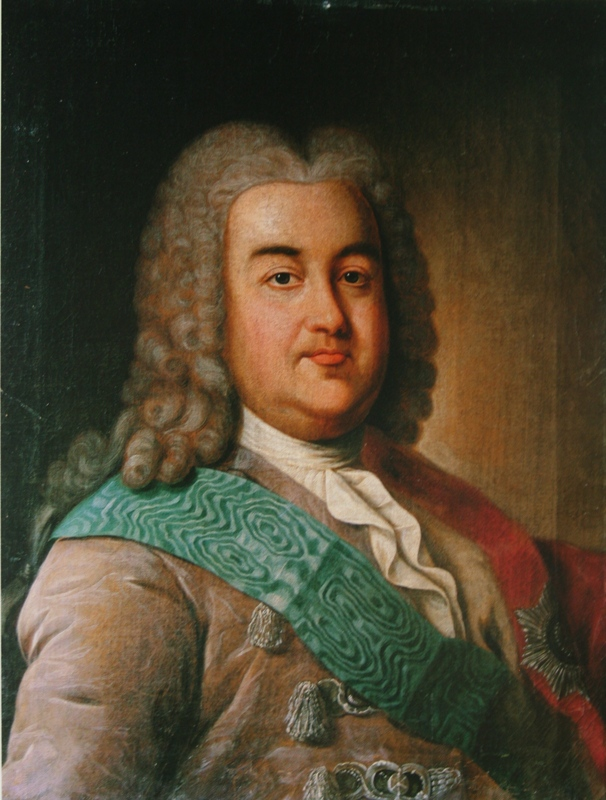
Prince Alexey Cherkassky (1680–1742)

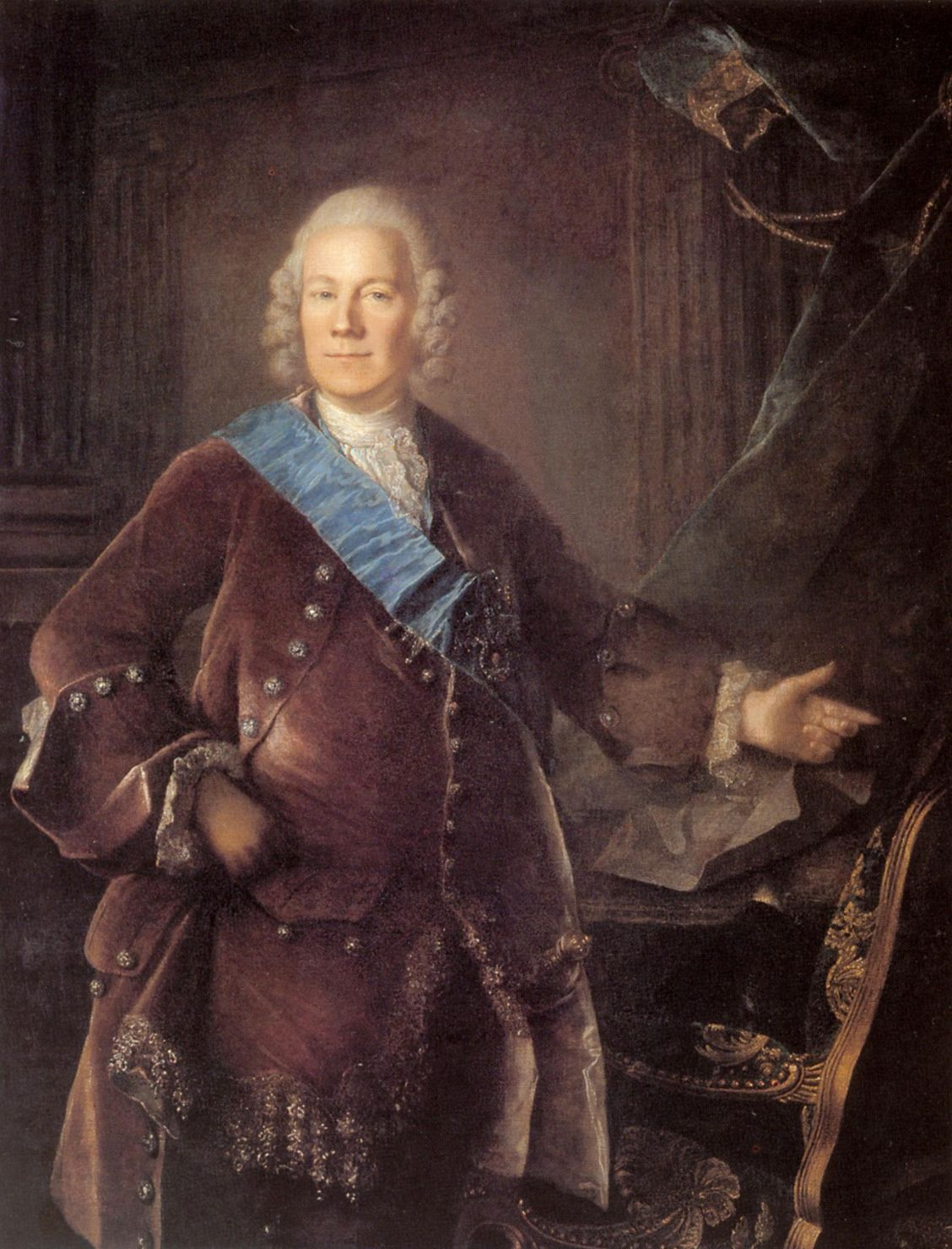
Count Alexey Bestuzhev-Ryumin (1693–1766)

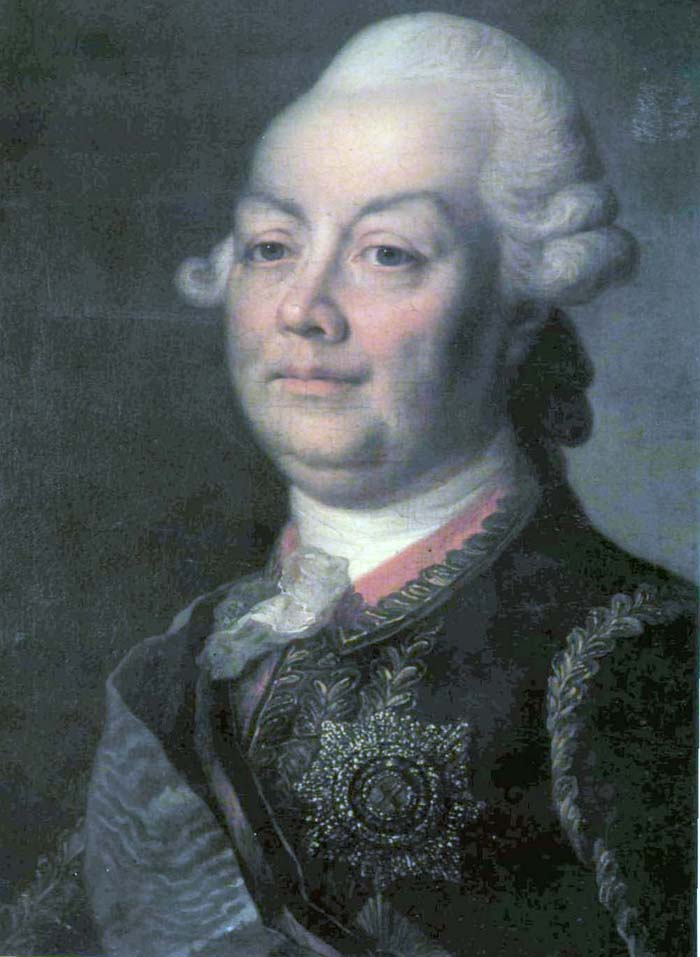
Count Pyotr Rumyantsev-Zadunaisky (1725–1796)

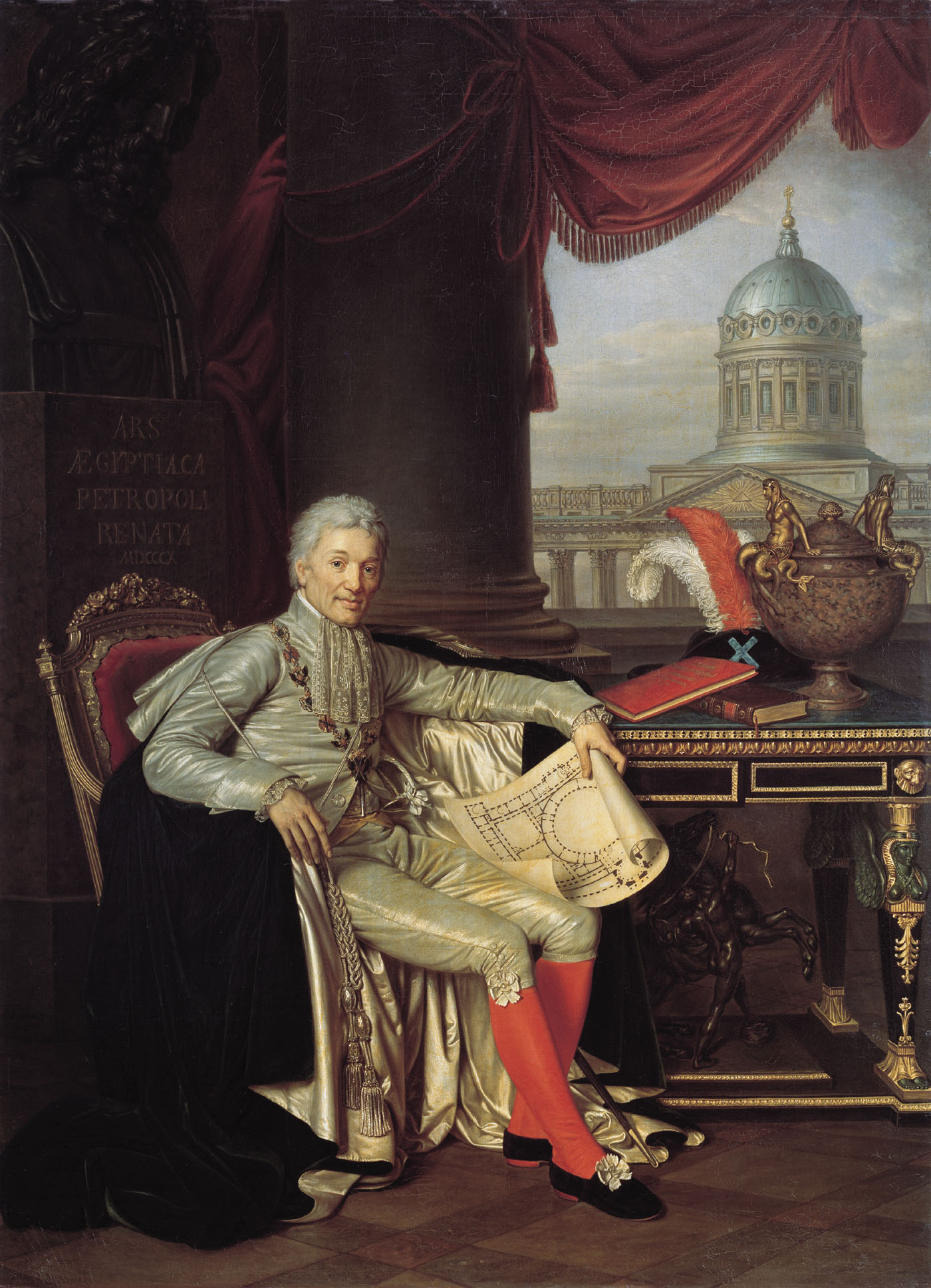
Count Alexander Stroganov (1733–1811)

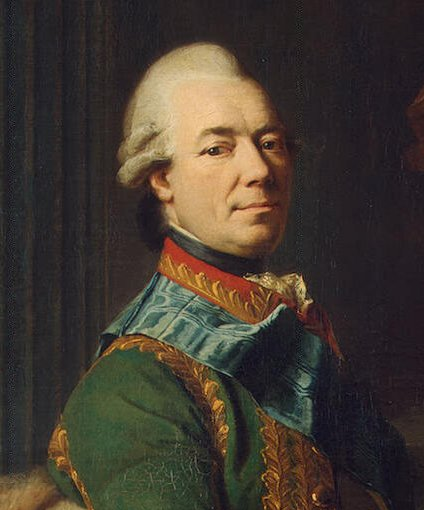
Count Zakhar Chernyshev (1722–1784)

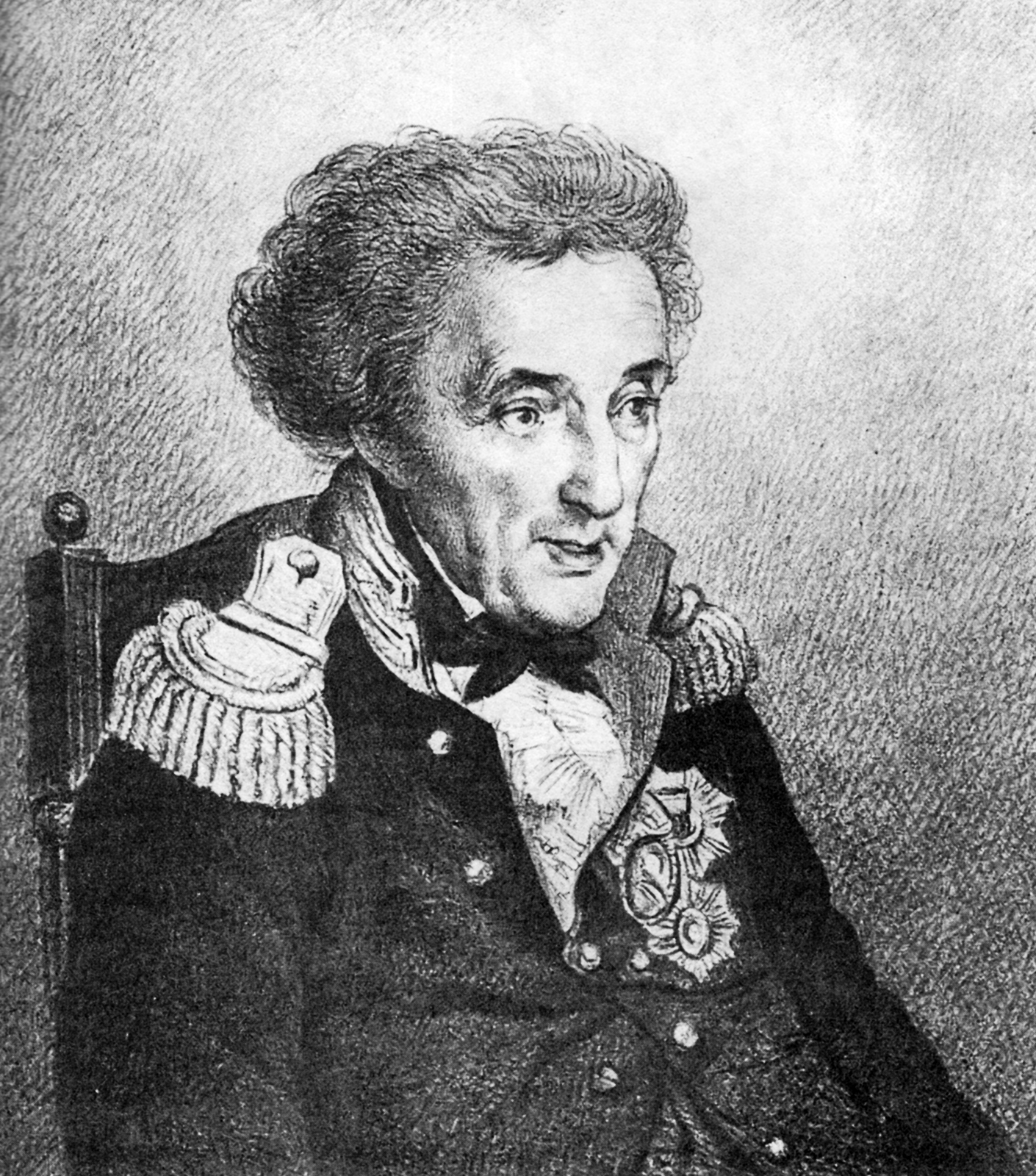
Prince Nikolay Saltykov (1736–1816)

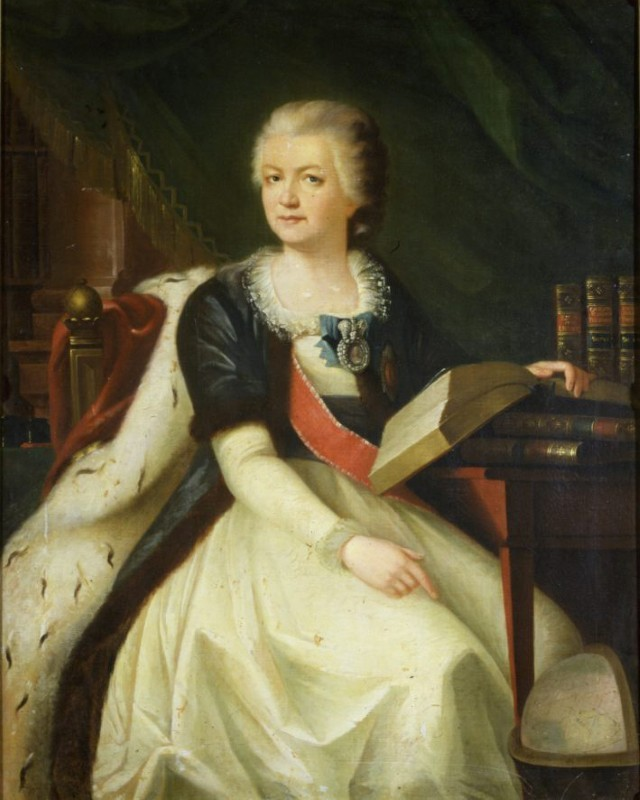
Princess Yekaterina Dashkova (1743–1810)

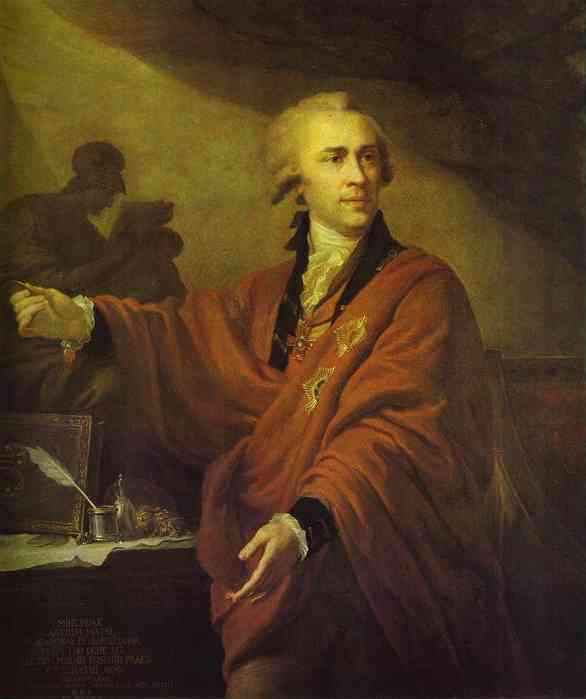
Count Aleksei Musin-Pushkin (1744–1817)

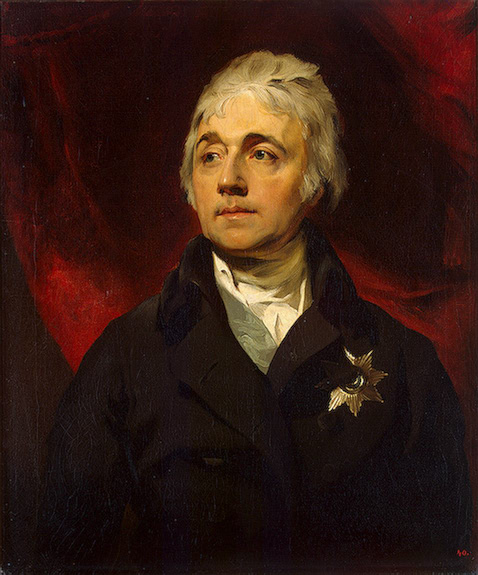
Count Semyon Vorontsov (1744–1832)

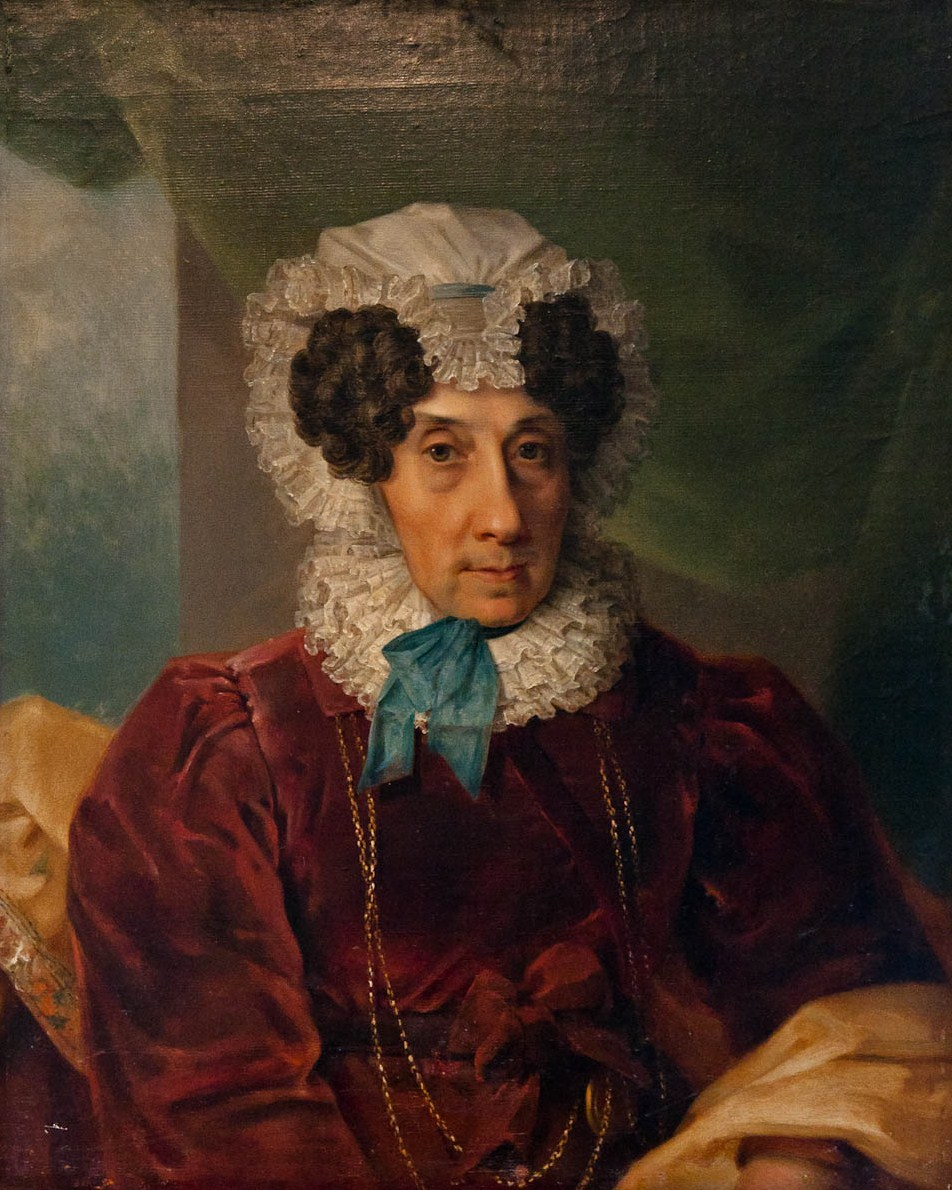
Countess Natalia Zagryazhskaya (1747–1837)

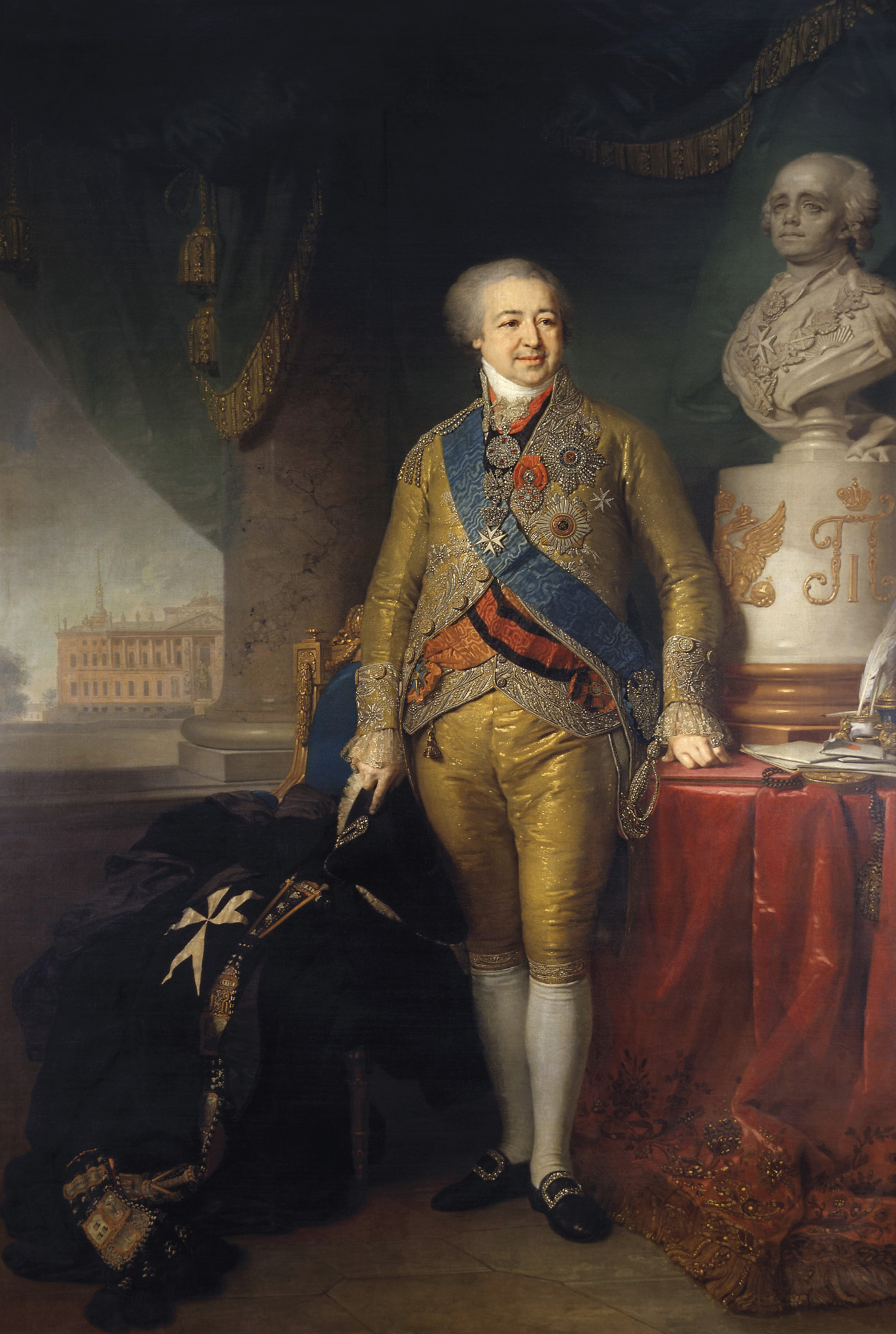
Prince Alexander Kurakin (1752–1818)

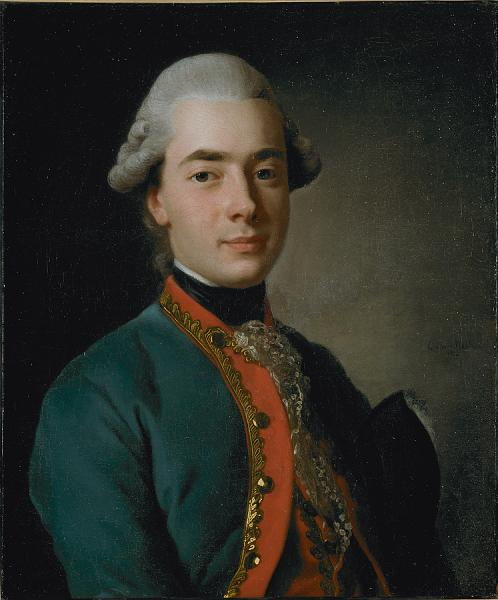
Prince Andrey Razumovsky (1752–1836)

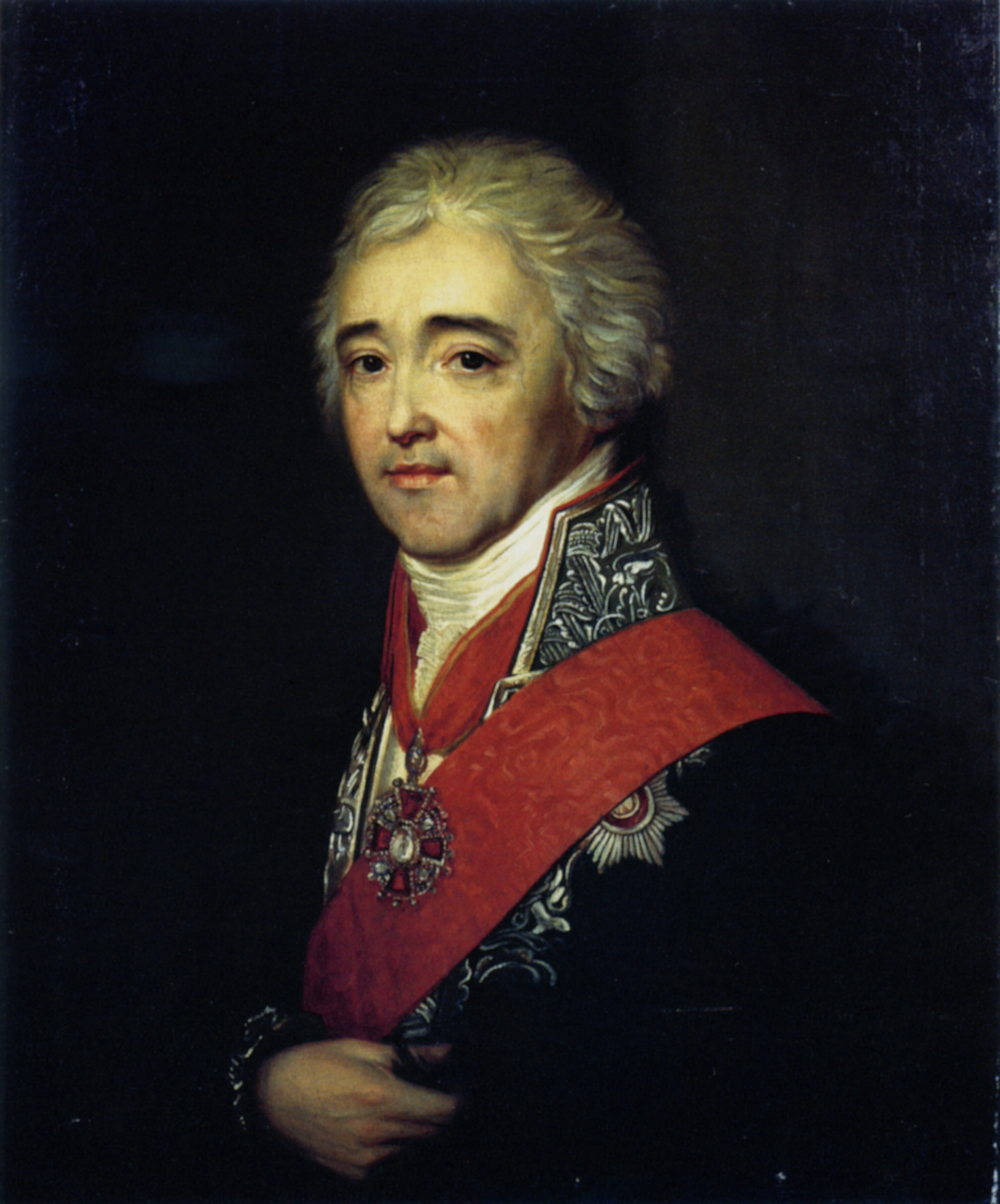
Prince Yakov Lobanov-Rostovsky (1760–1831)

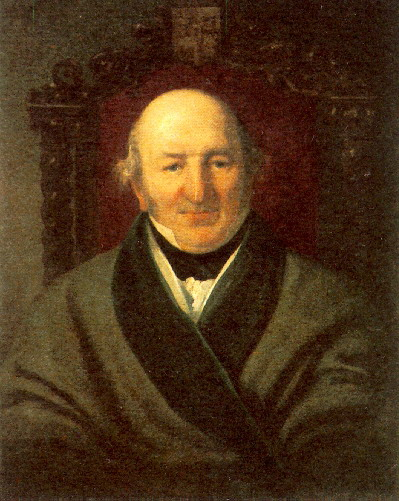
Prince Alexander Shakhovskoy (1777–1846)

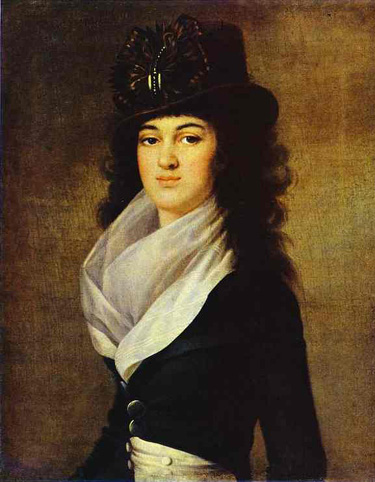
Countess Anna Lopukhina (1777–1805)

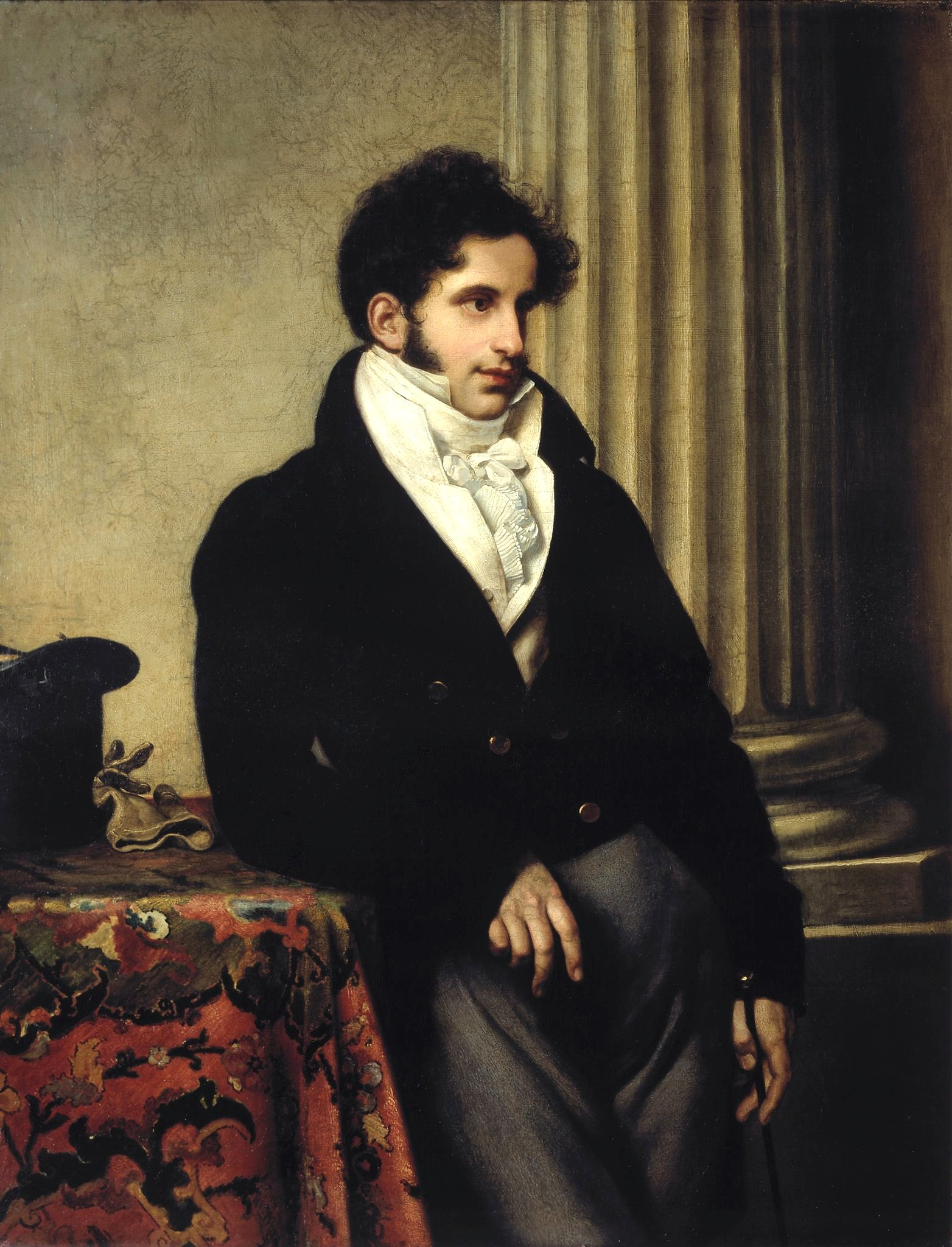
Count Sergey Uvarov (1786–1855)

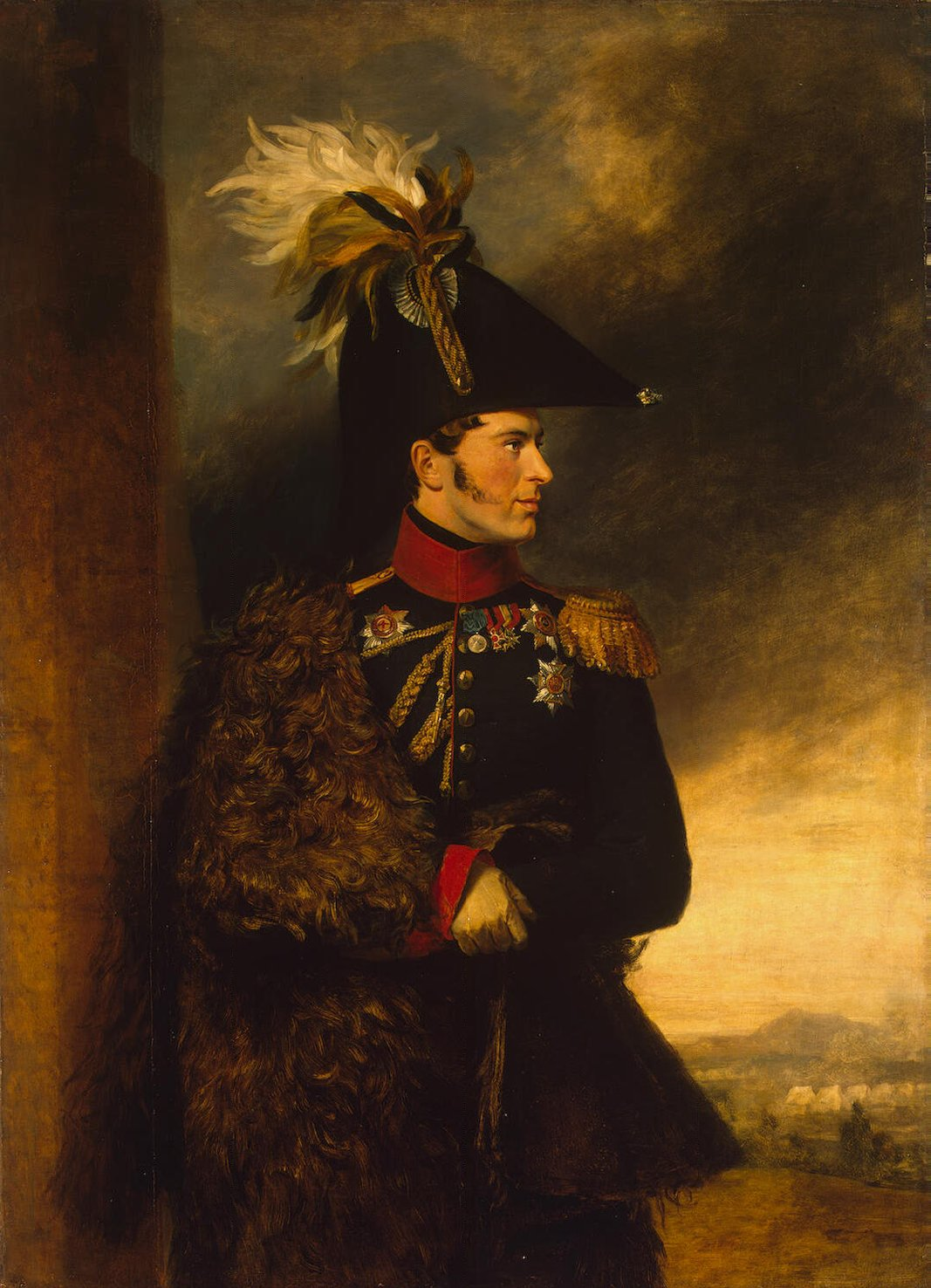
Prince Alexander Menshikov (1787–1869)

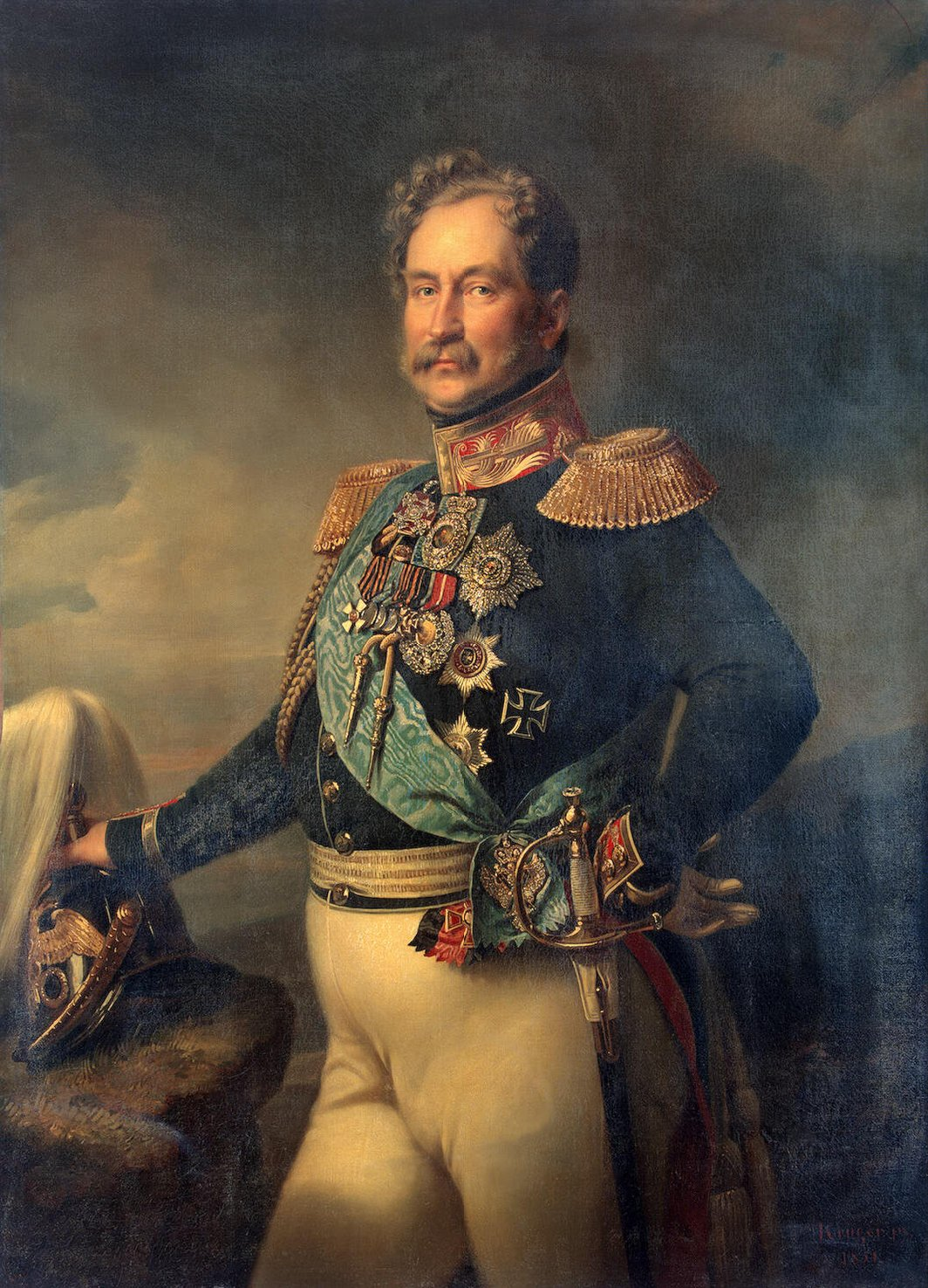
Prince Alexey Orlov (1787–1862)

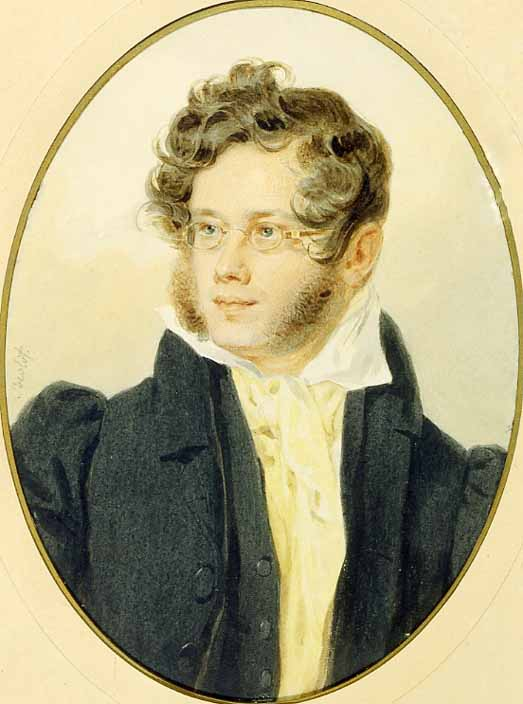
Prince Pyotr Vyazemsky (1792–1878)

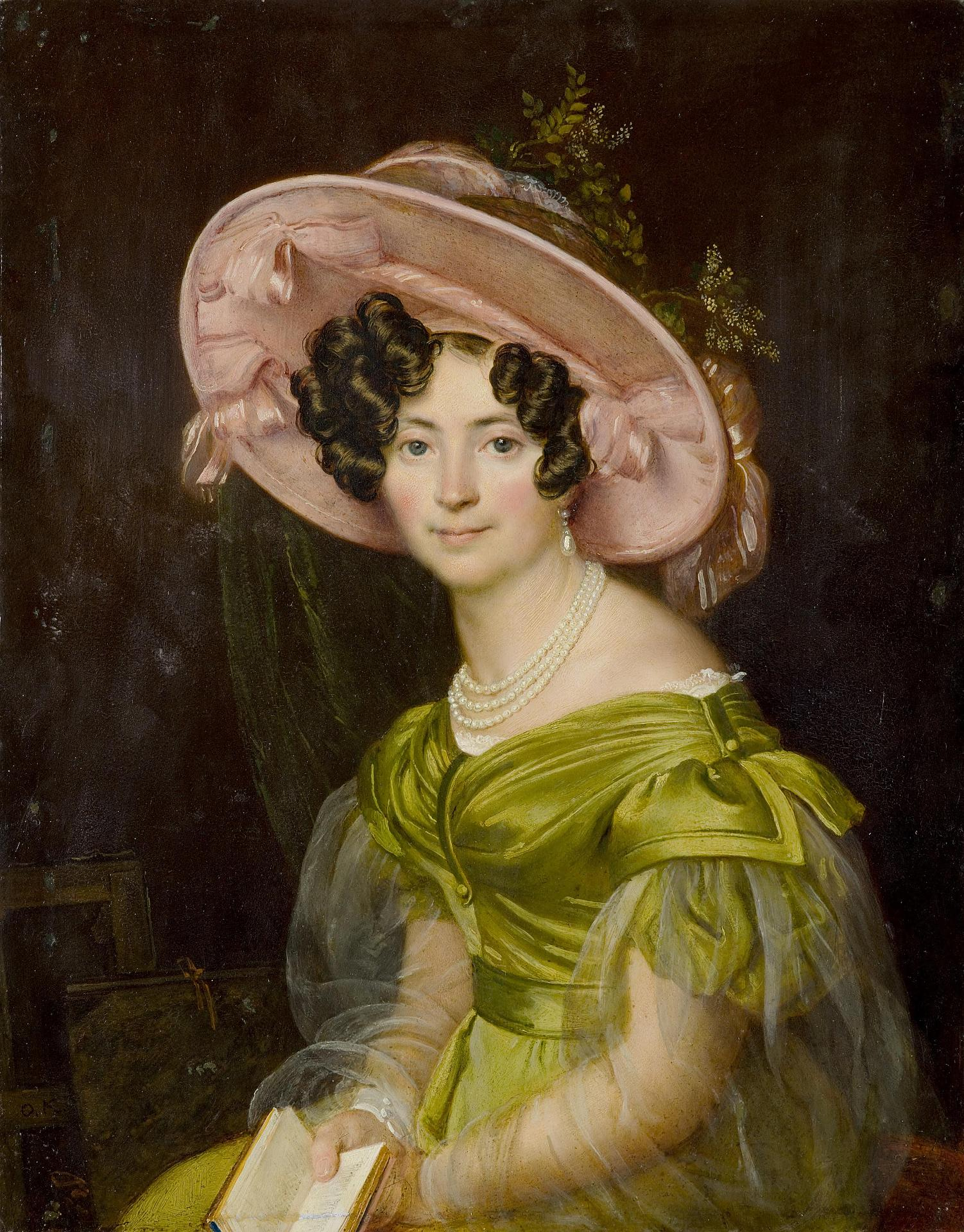
Princess Zinaida Volkonskaya (1792–1862)

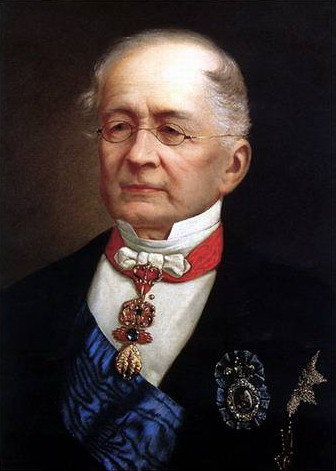
Prince Alexander Gorchakov (1798–1883)

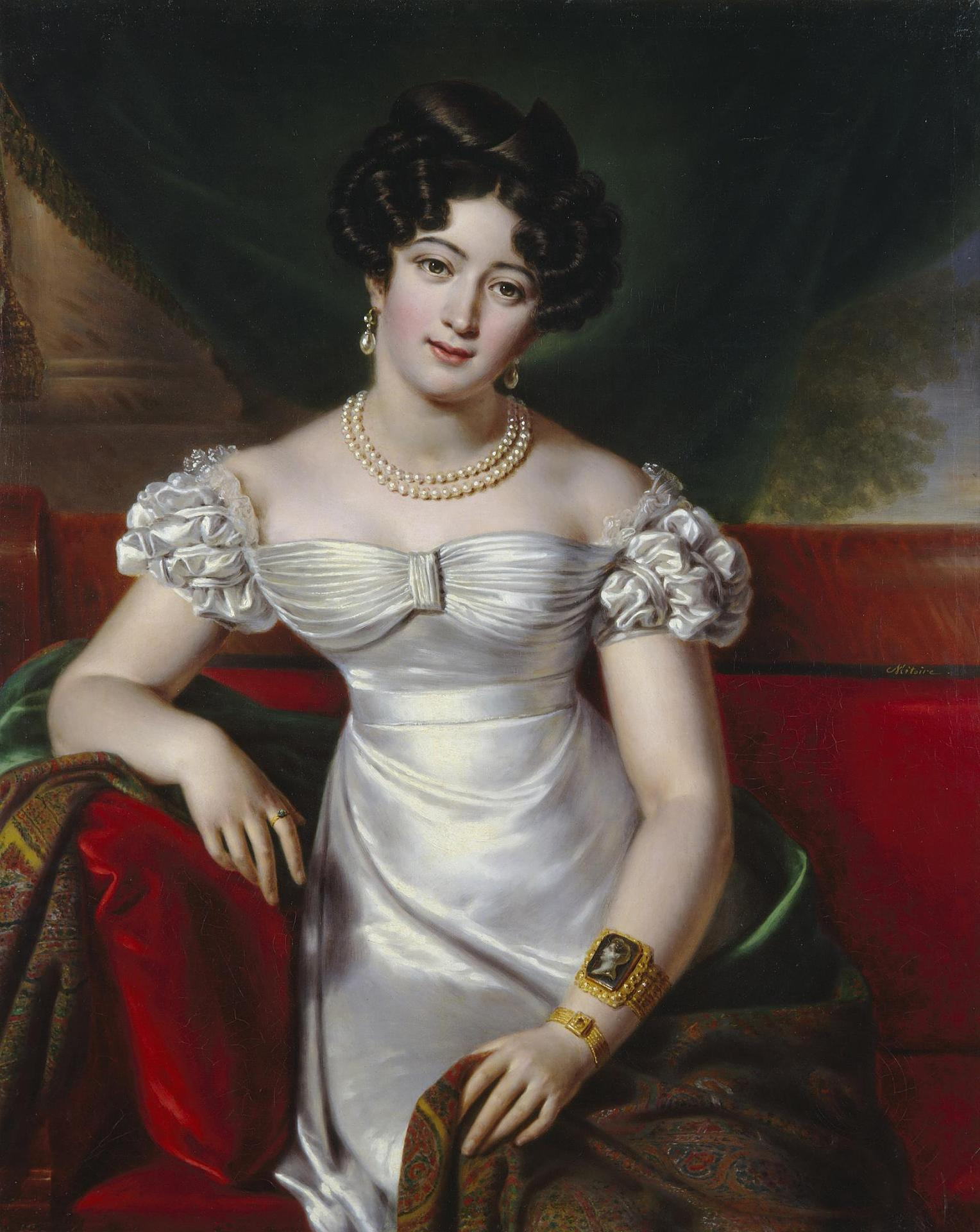
Countess Yuliya Samoylova (1803–1875)

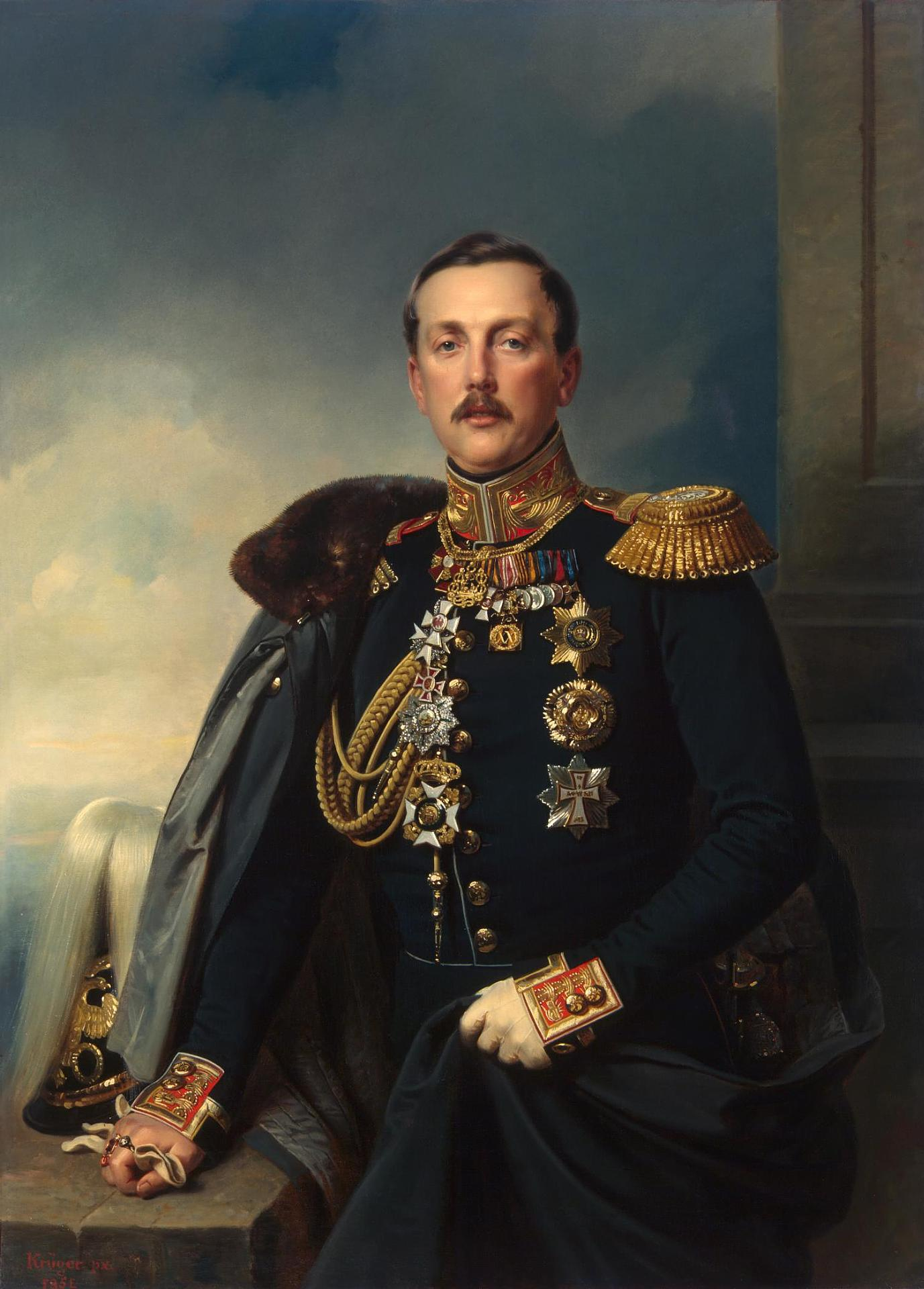
Prince Alexander Suvorov (1804–1882)

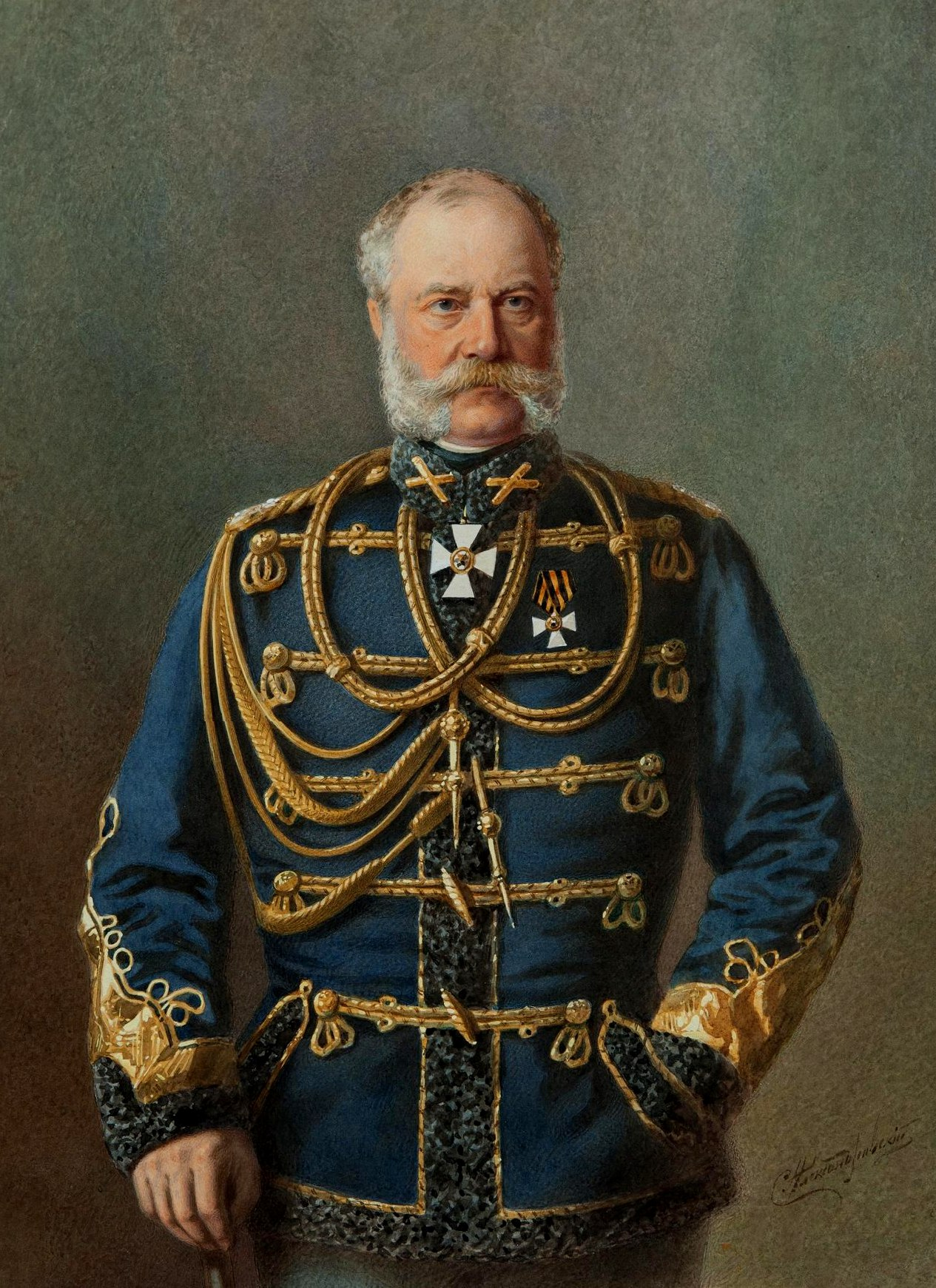
Prince Alexander Baryatinsky (1815–1879)

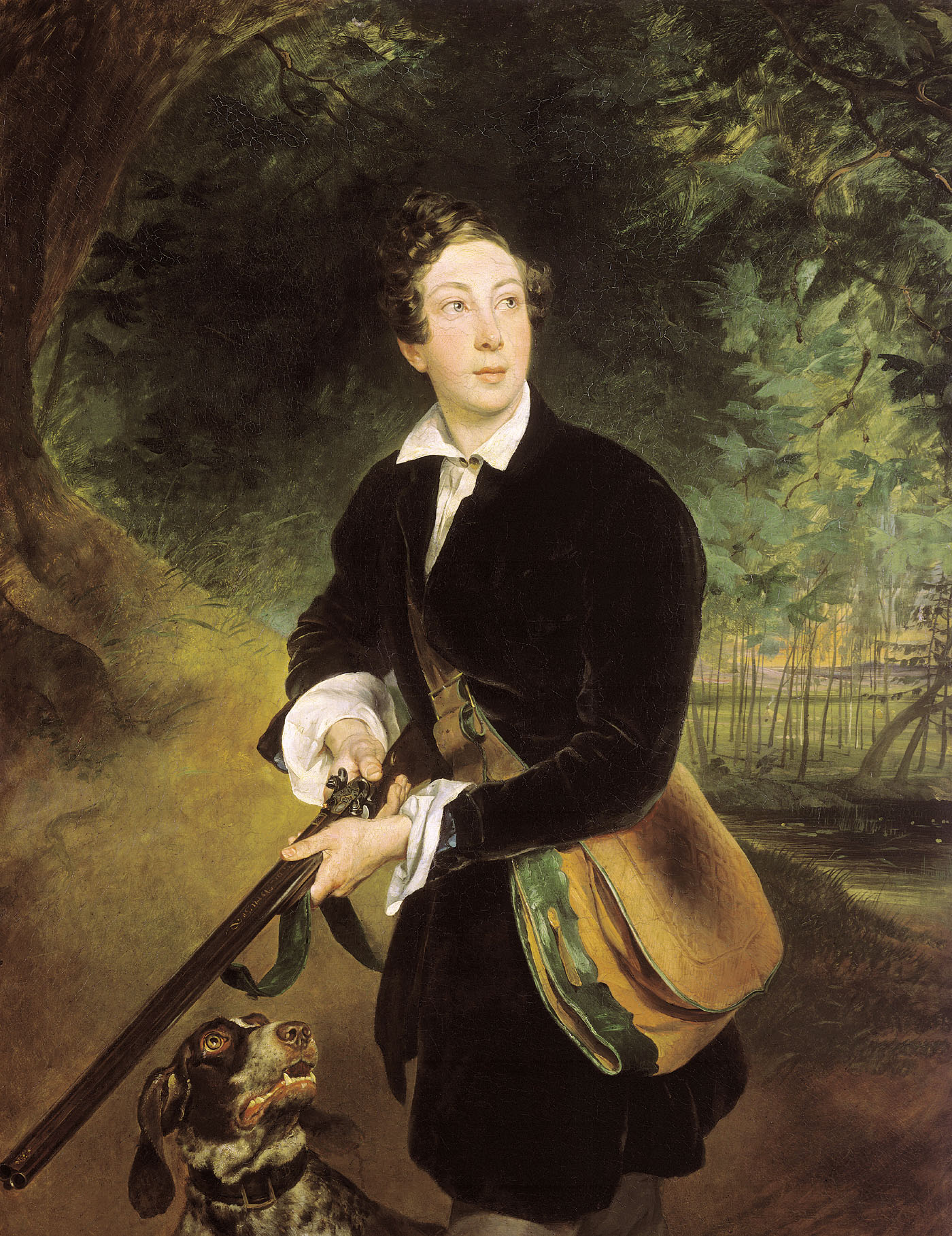
Count Aleksey Tolstoy (1817–1875)

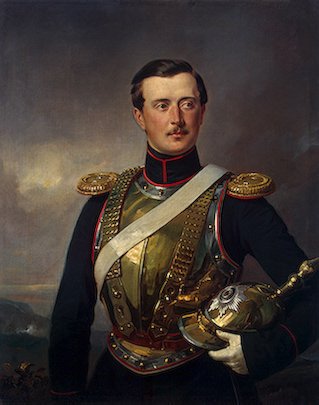
Count Pyotr Shuvalov (1827–1889)

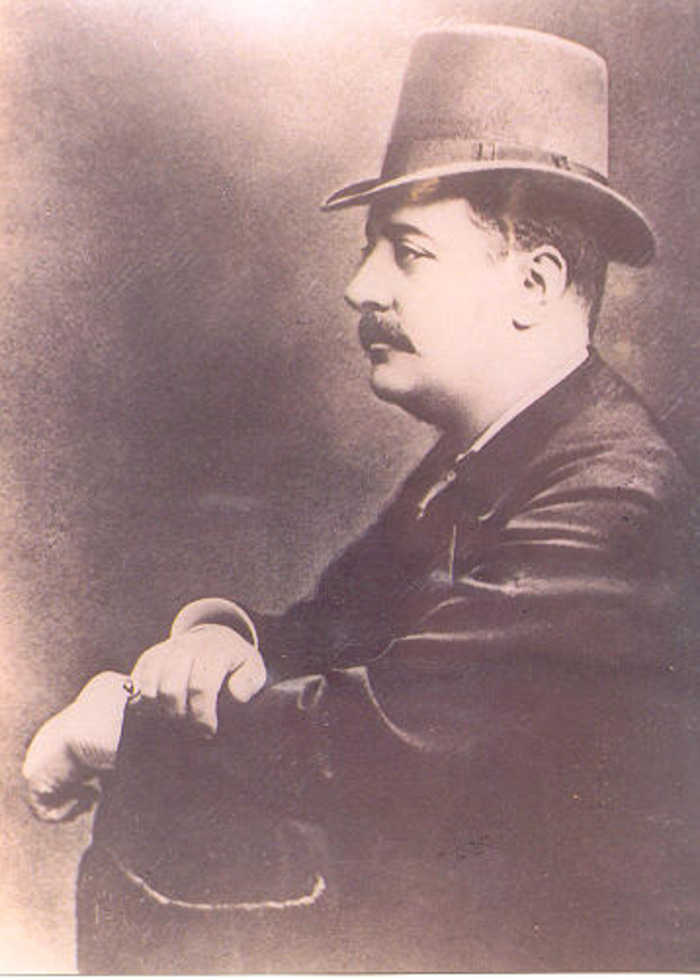
Pavel Demidov, Prince of San Donato (1839–1885)

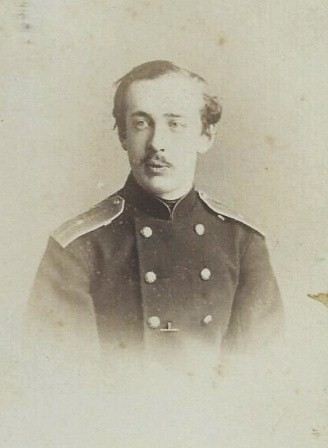
Prince Konstantin Beloselsky-Belozersky (1843–1920)

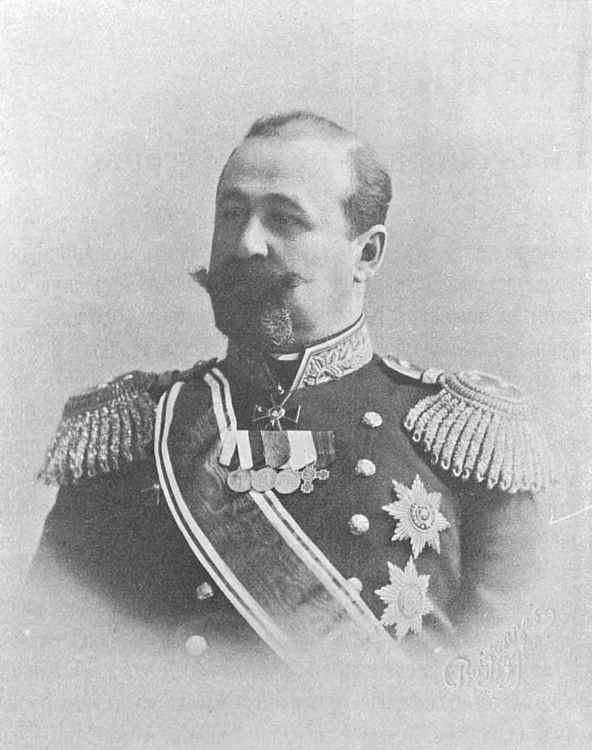
Prince Ivan Obolensky (1853–1910)

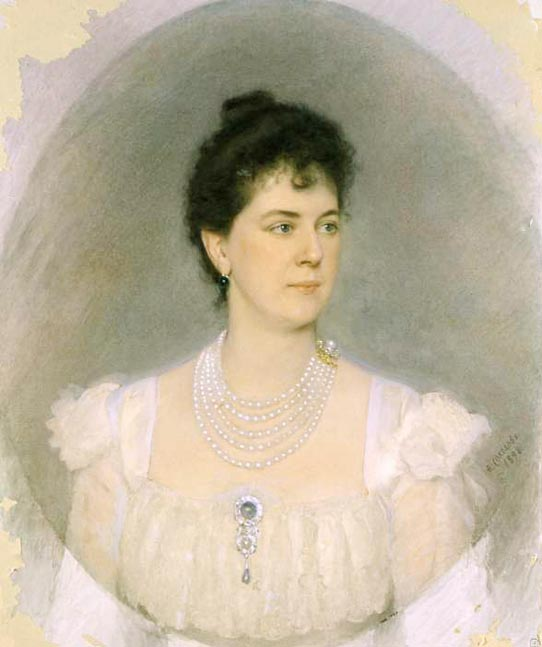
Princess Maria Tenisheva (1858–1928)

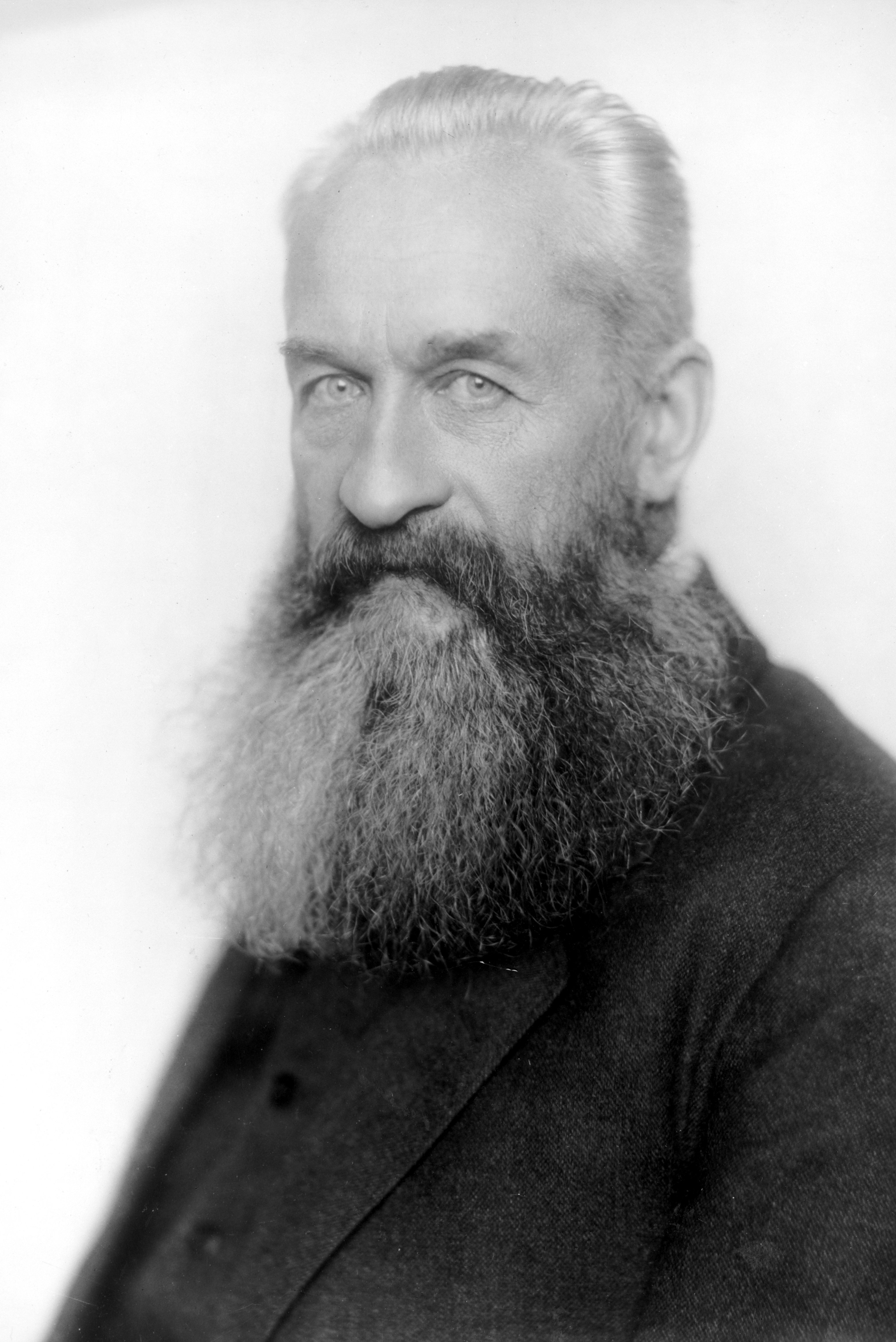
Prince Georgy Lvov (1861–1925)

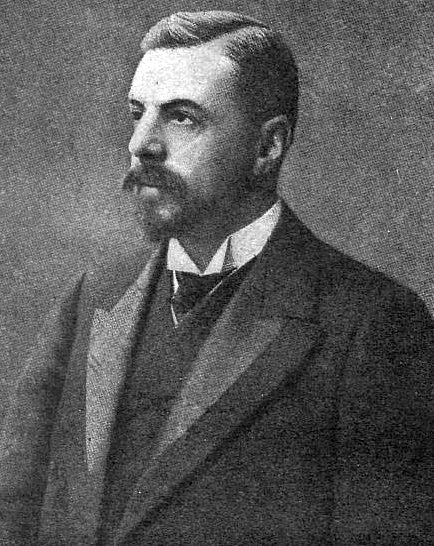
Prince Boris Vasilchikov (1863–1931)

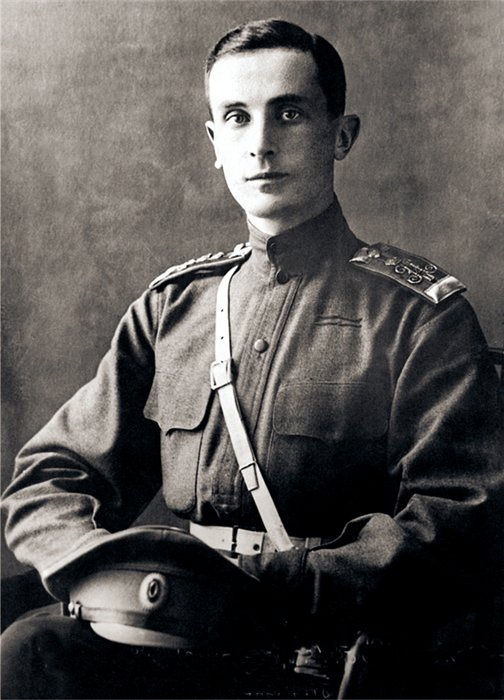
Prince Felix Yusupov (1887–1967)

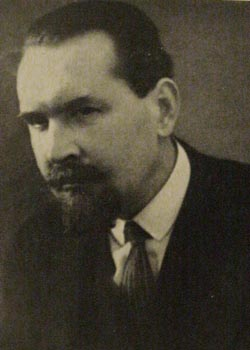
Prince Nikolai Trubetzkoy (1890–1938)

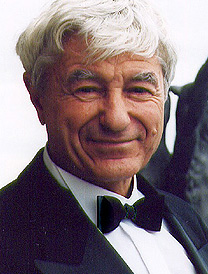
Prince Andrey Gagarin (1934–2011)
