= Ranks and insignia of the Imperial Russian Armed Forces =

The Ranks and insignia of the Imperial Russian Armed Forces were the military ranks used by the Imperial Russian Army and the Imperial Russian Navy. Many of the ranks were derived from the German model. The ranks were abolished following the Russian Revolution, with the Red Army adopting an entirely different system.

== Army ranks and rank designation ==
The following ranks and their respective insignia were also used by the personnel of the Imperial Russian Air Service from 1912 to 1917.

=== Army ranks ===
==== 1698–1716 ====
Rank group	General officers (Russian: Генералы, romanized: Generaly)				
Ranks	Генерал-фельдмаршал (Генералиссимус); General-fel'dmarshal (Generalissimus)	Генерал-аншеф; General-anshef	Генерал-поручик; General-poruchik	Генерал-майор; General-mayor	Бригадир; Brigadir

Rank group	Field officers (Russian: Штаб-офицеры, romanized: Shtab-ofitsery)			Company officers (Russian: Обер-офицеры, romanized: Ober-ofitsery)			
Ranks	Полковник; Polkovnik	Подполковник; Podpolkovnik	Майор; Mayor	Капитан; Kapitan	Поручик; Poruchik	Подпоручик; Podporuchik	Прапорщик; Praporshchik

Rank group	Non-commissioned officers (Russian: Урядники, romanized: Uryadniki)					Enlisted ranks (Russian: Нижние чины, romanized: Nizhniye Chiny)
Ranks	Сержант; Serzhant	Подпрапорщик; Podoraporshchik	Каптенармус; Kaptenarmus	Фурьер; Furʹer	Капрал; Kapral	Рядовой; Ryadovoy

==== 1716–1722 ====
Rank group	General officers (Russian: Генералы, romanized: Generaly)						
Infantry Ranks	Генералиссимус; Generalissimus	Генерал-фельдмаршал; General-fel'dmarshal	Генерал-фельдмаршал-лейтенант; General-fel'dmarshal-leytenant	Генерал-аншеф; General-anshef	Генерал-поручик; General-poruchik	Генерал-майор; General-mayor	Бригадир; Brigadir
Cavalry ranks	—			Генерал по кавалерии General po kavalerii	Генерал-поручик; General-poruchik	Генерал-майор; General-mayor	Бригадир; Brigadir

Rank group	Field officers (Russian: Штаб-офицеры, romanized: Shtabofitsery)				Company officers (Russian: Обер-офицеры, romanized: Oberofitsery)			
Infantry Ranks	Полковник; Polkovnik	Подполковник; Podpolkovnik	Премьер Майор; Prem'er Mayor	Секунд-Майор; Sekund Mayor	Капитан; Kapitan	Поручик; Poruchik	Подпоручик; Podporuchik	Прапорщик (фендрик); Praporshchik (Fendrik)
Cavalry ranks	Полковник; Polkovnik	Подполковник; Podpolkovnik	Премьер Майор; Prem'er Mayor	Секунд-Майор; Sekund Mayor	Капитан; Kapitan	Поручик; Poruchik	Подпоручик; Podporuchik	Прапорщик; Praporshchik

Rank group	Non-commissioned officers (Russian: Урядники, romanized: Uryadniki)					Enlisted ranks (Russian: Нижние чины, romanized: Nizhniye Chiny)
Infantry Ranks	Сержант; Serzhant	Мла́дший сержа́нт Mládshiy serzhánt	Фурьер; Fur'yer	Подпрапорщик; Podpraporshchik	Капрал; Kapral	Мушкетёр, пикинёр и т.д. Mushketyor, pikinyor etc.
Cavalry ranks	Сержант; Serzhant	Мла́дший сержа́нт Mládshiy serzhánt	Фурьер; Fur'yer	Подпрапорщик; Podpraporshchik	Капрал; Kapral	Драгун, рейтар и т.д. Dragun, reytar etc.

==== 1722–1731 ====
Rank group	General officers (Russian: Генералы, romanized: Generaly)				
Rank code	I	II		III	IV
Infantry ranks	Генерал-фельдмаршал; General-fel'dmarshal	Генерал-аншеф; General-anshef		Генерал-поручик; General-poruchik	Генерал-майор; General-mayor
Cavalry ranks	-	Генерал от кавалерии General ot kavalerii		Генерал-поручик; General-poruchik	Генерал-майор; General-mayor
Artillery troops ranks	-	Генерал-фельдцехмейстер; General-fel'dtsekhmeyster	Генерал от артиллерии General ot artillerii	Генерал-поручик; General-poruchik	Генерал-майор; General-mayor
Engineer troops ranks	-	Генерал-фельдцехмейстер; General-fel'dtsekhmeyster	Генерал инженеров General inzhenerov	Генерал-поручик; General-poruchik	Генерал-майор; General-mayor

Rank group		Field officers (Russian: Штаб-офицеры, romanized: Shtab-ofitsery)				Company officers (Russian: Обер-офицеры, romanized: Ober-ofitsery)				
Cold weapon ranks insignia		-								
Infantry and Cavalry	Rank code	V	VI	VII	VIII	IX	X	XII	XIII	XIV
Infantry and Cavalry	Rank	Бригадир; Brigadir	Полковник; Polkovnik	Подполковник; Podpolkovnik	Майор; Mayor	Капитан; Kapitan	Капитан-поручик; Kapitan-poruchik	Поручик; Poruchik	Подпоручик; Podporuchik	Прапорщик (фендрик); Praporshchik (Fendrik)
Artillery and Engineer troops	Rank code	V		VI	VII	VIII	IX	X	XII	XIII
Artillery and Engineer troops	Rank	Полковник; Polkovnik		Подполковник; Podpolkovnik	Майор; Mayor	Капитан; Kapitan	Капитан-поручик; Kapitan-poruchik	Поручик; Poruchik	Подпоручик; Podporuchik	Штык-юнкер; Shtyk-yunker
Life guard Preobrazhensky and Semyonovsky regiments	Rank code	IV		V	VI	VII	VIII	IX	X	XII
Life guard Preobrazhensky and Semyonovsky regiments	Rank	Лейб-гвардии полковник Leyb-gvardii polkovnik		Лейб-гвардии подполковник Leyb-gvardii podpolkovnik	Лейб-гвардии майор Leyb-gvardii mayor	Лейб-гвардии капитан Leyb-gvardii kapitan	Лейб-гвардии капитан-поручик Leyb-gvardii kapitan-poruchik	Лейб-гвардии поручик Leyb-gvardii poruchik	Лейб-гвардии подпоручик Leyb-gvardii podporuchik	Лейб-гвардии прапорщик Leyb-gvardii praporshchik

Rank group		Non-commissioned officers (Russian: Унтер-офицеры, romanized: Unter-ofitsery)						Enlisted ranks (Russian: Нижние чины, romanized: Nizhniye Chiny)
Cold weapon ranks insignia		-		-				-
Infantry ranks		Фельдфебель; Fel'dfebel'	Сержант; Serzhant	Подпрапорщик; Podpraporshchik	Каптенармус; Kaptenarmus	Фурьер; Furʹer	Капрал; Kapral	Мушкетёр, гренадёр и т.д. Mushketyor, grenadyor etc.
Cavalry ranks		Фельдфебель; Fel'dfebel'	Сержант; Serzhant	Подпрапорщик; Podpraporshchik	Каптенармус; Kaptenarmus	Фурьер; Furʹer	Капрал; Kapral	Драгун, кирасир и т.д. Dragun, kirasir etc.
Artillery troops		Фельдфебель; Fel'dfebel'	Сержант; Serzhant	Подпрапорщик; Podpraporshchik	Каптенармус; Kaptenarmus	Фурьер; Furʹer	Капрал; Kapral	Канонир (гандлангер); Kanonir (ganglandger)
Engineer troops ranks		Фельдфебель; Fel'dfebel'	Сержант; Serzhant	Подпрапорщик; Podpraporshchik	Каптенармус; Kaptenarmus	Фурьер; Furʹer	Капрал; Kapral	Сапёр (пионер, минер, понтонер); Sapyor (pioner, minyor, pontoner)
Life guardPreobrazhensky and Semyonovsky regiments	Rank code	XIII	XIV					
Life guardPreobrazhensky and Semyonovsky regiments	Rank	Лейб-гвардии фельдфебель Leyb-gvardii fel'dfebel'	Лейб-гвардии сержант Leyb-gvardii serzhant	Лейб-гвардии подпрапорщик Leyb-gvardii podpraporshchik	Лейб-гвардии каптенармус Leyb-gvardii kaptenarmus	Лейб-гвардии фурьер Leyb-gvardii fur'er	Лейб-гвардии капрал Leyb-gvardii kapral	Лейб-гвардии мушкетёр, гренадёр и т.д. Leyb-gvardii mushketyor, grenadyor etc.

==== 1731–1765 ====
Rank group	General officers (Russian: Генералы, romanized: Generaly)				
Rank code	I	II		III	IV
Infantry ranks	Генерал-фельдмаршал; General-fel'dmarshal	Генерал-аншеф; General-anshef		Генерал-поручик; General-poruchik	Генерал-майор; General-mayor
Cavalry ranks	-	Генерал от кавалерии General ot kavalerii		Генерал-поручик; General-poruchik	Генерал-майор; General-mayor
Artillery ranks	-	Генерал-фельдцехмейстер; General-feldtsekhmeyster	Генерал от артиллерии General ot artillerii	Генерал-поручик; General-poruchik	Генерал-майор; General-mayor
Engineer troops ranks	-	Генерал-фельдцехмейстер; General-feldtsekhmeyster	Генерал инженеров General inzhenerov	Генерал-поручик; General-poruchik	Генерал-майор; General-mayor

Rank group		Field officers (Russian: Штаб-офицеры, romanized: Shtab-ofitsery)					Company officers (Russian: Обер-офицеры, romanized: Ober-ofitsery)							
Infantry	Rank code	V	VI	VII	VIII		IX	X	XI	XII	XIII		XIV	
Infantry	Ranks	Бригадир; Brigadir	Полковник; Polkovnik	Подполковник; Podpolkovnik	Премьер Майор; Prem'er Mayor	Секунд-Майор; Sekund-Mayor	Капитан; Kapitan	-		Поручик; Poruchik	Подпоручик Podporuchik		Прапорщик (фендрик) Praporshchik (Fendrik)	
Cavalry	Ranks	Бригадир; Brigadir	Полковник; Polkovnik	Подполковник; Podpolkovnik	Премьер Майор; Prem'er Mayor	Секунд-Майор; Sekund-Mayor	Ротмистр; Rotmistr	-		Поручик; Poruchik	Подпоручик Podporuchik		Корнет; Kornet	
Artillery and Engineer troops	Rank code	V		VI	VII		VIII	IX		X	XI	XII	XIII	XIV
Artillery and Engineer troops	Ranks	Полковник; Polkovnik		Подполковник; Podpolkovnik	Майор; Mayor		Капитан; Kapitan	-		Поручик; Poruchik	-	Подпоручик; Podporuchik	Штык-юнкер; Shtyk-yunker	-
Life guard infantry	Rank code	IV		V	VI		VII	VIII		IX	X	XI	XII	
Life guard infantry	Ranks	Лейб-гвардии полковник Leyb-gvardii polkovnik		Лейб-гвардии подполковник Leyb-gvardii podpolkovnik	Лейб-гвардии майор Leyb-gvardii mayor		Лейб-гвардии капитан Leyb-gvardii kapitan	Лейб-гвардии капитан-поручик Leyb-gvardii kapitan-poruchik		Лейб-гвардии поручик Leyb-gvardii poruchik	Лейб-гвардии подпоручик Leyb-gvardii podporuchik	-	Лейб-гвардии прапорщик Leyb-gvardii praporshchik	
Life guard cavalry	Ranks	Лейб-гвардии полковник Leyb-gvardii polkovnik		Лейб-гвардии подполковник Leyb-gvardii podpolkovnik	Лейб-гвардии майор Leyb-gvardii mayor		Лейб-гвардии ротмистр Leyb-gvardii rotmistr	Лейб-гвардии секунд-ротмистр Leyb-gvardii sekund-rotmistr		Лейб-гвардии поручик Leyb-gvardii poruchik	Лейб-гвардии подпоручик Leyb-gvardii podporuchik	-	Лейб-гвардии корнет Leyb-gvardii kornet	
Life company (1741–1762) Grenadier company of Preobrazhensky Regiment	Rank code						-	II		III	IV	V	VI	
Life company (1741–1762) Grenadier company of Preobrazhensky Regiment	Ranks						Капитан; Kapitan (Empress Elizabeth Petrovna)	Капитан-поручик; Kapitan-poruchik		Поручик; Poruchik	Подпоручик; Podporuchik	Адъютант; Ad'yutant	Прапорщик; Praporshchik	

Rank group		Non-commissioned officers (Russian: Унтер-офицеры, romanized: Unter-ofitsery)								Enlisted ranks (Russian: Нижние чины, romanized: Nizhniye Chiny)	
Infantry ranks		Фельдфебель Fel'dfebel'	Сержант Serzhant		Подпрапорщик Podpraporshchik	Каптенармус Kaptenarmus	Фурьер Fur'er	Капрал Kapral		Мушкетёр, гренадёр и т.д. Mushketyor, grenadyor etc.	
Cavalry ranks		Фельдфебель Fel'dfebel'	Сержант Serzhant		Гефрейт-капрал Gefreyt-kapral	Каптенармус Kaptenarmus	Фурьер Fur'er	Капрал Kapral		Мушкетёр, гренадёр и т.д. Mushketyor, grenadyor etc.	
Artillery ranks		Фельдфебель Fel'dfebel'	Сержант Serzhant		Подпрапорщик Podpraporshchik	Каптенармус Kaptenarmus	Фурьер Fur'er	Капрал Kapral		Драгун, кирасир и т.д. Dragun, kirasir etc.	
Engineer troops ranks		Фельдфебель Fel'dfebel'	Сержант Serzhant		Подпрапорщик Podpraporshchik	Каптенармус Kaptenarmus	Фурьер Fur'er	Капрал Kapral		Драгун, кирасир и т.д. Dragun, kirasir etc.	
Life guard infantry	Rank code	XIII	XIV		-						
Life guard infantry	Ranks	Лейб-гвардии фельдфебель Leyb-gvardii fel'dfebel'	Лейб-гвардии сержант Leyb-gvardii serzhant		Лейб-гвардии подпрапорщик Leyb-gvardii podpraporshchik	Лейб-гвардии каптенармус Leyb-gvardii kaptenarmus	Лейб-гвардии фурьер Leyb-gvardii fur'er	Лейб-гвардии капрал Leyb-gvardii kapral		Лейб-гвардии мушкетёр, гренадёр и т.д. Leyb-gvardii mushketyor, grenadyor etc.	
Life guard cavalry	Ranks	Лейб-гвардии фельдфебель Leyb-gvardii fel'dfebel'	Лейб-гвардии сержант Leyb-gvardii serzhant		Лейб-гвардии гефрейт-капрал Leyb-gvardii gefreyt-kapral	Лейб-гвардии каптенармус Leyb-gvardii kaptenarmus	Лейб-гвардии фурьер Leyb-gvardii fur'er	Лейб-гвардии капрал Leyb-gvardii kapral		Лейб-гвардии драгун, кирасир и т.д. Leyb-gvardii dragun, kirasir etc.	
Life company (1741–1762) Grenadier company of Preobrazhensky Regiment	Rank code	VII		VIII				IX	X	XI	XII
Life company (1741–1762) Grenadier company of Preobrazhensky Regiment	Ranks	-	Cержант Serzhant	Вице-сержант Vitse-serzhant	Подпрапорщик Podpraporshchik	-	Фурьер Fur'er	Капрал Kapral	-		Лейб-кампанеец Leyb-kampaneets

==== 1765–1798 ====
Rank group	General officers (Russian: Генералы, romanized: Generaly)				
Rank code	I	II		III	IV
Infantry ranks	Генерал-фельдмаршал; General-fel'dmarshal	Генерал-аншеф; General-anshef		Генерал-поручик; General-poruchik	Генерал-майор; General-mayor
Cavalry ranks (also сossacks ranks from 1796)	-	Генерал от кавалерии General ot kavalerii		Генерал-поручик; General-poruchik	Генерал-майор; General-mayor
Rank code	-	II		III	IV
Artillery ranks	-	Генерал-фельдцехмейстер; General-fel'dtsekhmeyster	Генерал от артиллерии General ot artillerii	Генерал-поручик; General-poruchik	Генерал-майор; General-mayor
Engineer troop ranks	-	Генерал-фельдцехмейстер; General-fel'dtsekhmeyster	Генерал инженеров General inzhenerov	Генерал-поручик; General-poruchik	Генерал-майор; General-mayor
Rank code	-				

Rank group	Field officers (Russian: Штаб-офицеры, romanized: Shtab-ofitsery)					Company officers (Russian: Обер-офицеры, romanized: Ober-ofitsery)						
Rank code	V	VI	VII	VIII		IX	X	XI	XII	XIII	XIV	
Infantry ranks	Бригадир; Brigadir	Полковник; Polkovnik	Подполковник; Podpolkovnik	Премьер Майор; Prem'er Mayor	Секунд-Майор; Sekund-Mayor	Капитан; Kapitan	-	Поручик; Poruchik	Подпоручик; Podporuchik	-	Прапорщик; Praporshchik	
Cavalry ranks (also сossacks ranks from 1796)	Бригадир; Brigadir	Полковник; Polkovnik	Подполковник; Podpolkovnik	Премьер Майор; Prem'er Mayor	Секунд-Майор; Sekund-Mayor	Ротмистр; Rotmistr	-	Поручик; Poruchik	Подпоручик; Podporuchik	-	Прапорщик; Praporshchik	
Rank code	V		VI	VII		VIII	IX	X	XI	XII	XIII	XIV
Artillery ranks	Полковник; Polkovnik		Подполковник; Podpolkovnik	Майор; Mayor		Капитан; Kapitan	Капитан-поручик; Kapitan-poruchik	Поручик; Poruchik	Подпоручик; Podporuchik	-	Прапорщик; Praporshchik	-
Rank code	IV		V	VI		VII	VIII	IX	X	XI	XII	
Guard infantry ranks	Лейб-гвардии полковник Leyb-gvardii polkovnik		Лейб-гвардии подполковник Leyb-gvardii podpolkovnik	Лейб-гвардии премьер майор Leyb-gvardii prem'er mayor	Лейб-гвардии секунд майор Leyb-gvardii sekund mayor	Лейб-гвардии капитан Leyb-gvardii kapitan	-	Лейб-гвардии поручик Leyb-gvardii poruchik	Лейб-гвардии подпоручик Leyb-gvardii podporuchik	-	Лейб-гвардии прапорщик Leyb-gvardii praporshchik	
Life guard cavalry ranks	Лейб-гвардии полковник Leyb-gvardii polkovnik		Лейб-гвардии подполковник Leyb-gvardii podpolkovnik	Лейб-гвардии премьер майор Leyb-gvardii prem'er mayor	Лейб-гвардии секунд майор Leyb-gvardii sekund mayor	Лейб-гвардии ротмистр Leyb-gvardii rotmistr	-	Лейб-гвардии поручик Leyb-gvardii poruchik	-	-	Лейб-гвардии прапорщик Leyb-gvardii praporshchik	

Rank group	Non-commissioned officers (Russian: Унтер-офицеры, romanized: Unter-ofitsery)						Enlisted ranks (Russian: Нижние чины, romanized: Nizhniye Chiny)
Infantry ranks	Старший сержант Starshiy serzhant	Младший сержант Mladshiy serzhant	Подпрапорщик; Podpraporshchik	Каптенармус; Kaptenarmus	Фурьер; Furʹer	Капрал; Kapral	Мушкетёр, гренадёр и т.д. Mushketyor, grenadyor etc.
Cavalry ranks (also сossacks ranks from 1796)	Старший сержант Starshiy serzhant	Младший сержант Mladshiy serzhant	Подпрапорщик; Podpraporshchik	Каптенармус; Kaptenarmus	Фурьер; Furʹer	Капрал; Kapral	Драгун, кирасир и т.д. Dragun, kirasir etc.
Artillery ranks	Фельдфебель; Fel'dfebel'	Сержант; Serzhant	Подпрапорщик; Podpraporshchik	Каптенармус; Kaptenarmus	Фурьер; Fur'er	Капрал; Kapral	Канонир (гандлангер); Kanonir (ganglandger)
Engineer troop ranks	Фельдфебель; Fel'dfebel'	Сержант; Serzhant	Подпрапорщик; Podpraporshchik	Каптенармус; Kaptenarmus	Фурьер; Fur'er	Капрал; Kapral	Сапёр (пионер, минер, понтонер); Sapyor (pioner, minyor, pontoner)
Rank code	XIII	XIV					
Guard infantry ranks	Лейб-гвардии фельдфебель Leyb-gvardii fel'dfebel'	Лейб-гвардии сержант Leyb-gvardii serzhant	Лейб-гвардии подпрапорщик Leyb-gvardii podoraporshchik	Лейб-гвардии каптенармус Leyb-gvardii kaptenarmus	Лейб-гвардии фурьер Leyb-gvardii fur'er	Лейб-гвардии капрал Leyb-gvardii kapral	Лейб-гвардии мушкетёр, гренадёр и т.д. Leyb-gvardii mushketyor, grenadyor etc.
Life guard cavalry ranks	Лейб-гвардии фельдфебель Leyb-gvardii fel'dfebel'	Лейб-гвардии сержант Leyb-gvardii serzhant	Лейб-гвардии подпрапорщик Leyb-gvardii podoraporshchik	Лейб-гвардии каптенармус Leyb-gvardii kaptenarmus	Лейб-гвардии фурьер Leyb-gvardii fur'er	Лейб-гвардии капрал Leyb-gvardii kapral	Лейб-гвардии драгун, кирасир и т.д. Leyb-gvardii dragun, kirasir etc.

==== 1798–1800 ====
Rank group	General officers (Russian: Генералы, romanized: Generaly)					Field officers (Russian: Штаб-офицеры, romanized: Shtab-ofitsery)				Company officers (Russian: Обер-офицеры, romanized: Ober-ofitsery)						Non-commissioned officers (Russian: Унтер-офицеры, romanized: Unter-ofitsery)					Enlisted ranks (Russian: Нижние чины, romanized: Nizhniye Chiny)	
Rank code	I	II		III	IV	V	VI	VII	VIII	IX	X	XI	XII	XIII	XIV							
Infantry ranks	Генерал-фельдмаршал; General-fel'dmarshal	Генерал-аншеф; General-anshef		Генерал-поручик; General-poruchik	Генерал-майор; General-mayor	Бригадир; Brigadir	Полковник; Polkovnik	Подполковник; Podpolkovnik	Майор; Mayor	Капитан; Kapitan	Штабс-капитан; Shtabs-kapitan	-	Поручик; Poruchik	Подпоручик; Podporuchik	Прапорщик; Praporshchik	Фельдфебель; Fel'dfebel'		Портупей-прапорщик; Portupey-praporshchik	Подпрапорщик; Podpraporshchik	Младший унтер-офицер Mladshiy unter-ofitser	Рядовой старшего оклада Ryadovoy starshego oklada	Рядовой младшего оклада Ryadovoy mladshego oklada
Cavalry and Cossacks ranks	-	Генерал от кавалерии General ot kavalerii		Генерал-поручик; General-poruchik	Генерал-майор; General-mayor	Бригадир; Brigadir	Полковник; Polkovnik	Подполковник; Podpolkovnik	Майор; Mayor	Ротмистр; Rotmistr	Штаб-ротмистр; Shtab-rotmistr	-	Поручик; Poruchik	-	Корнет; Kornet	Вахмистр; Vakhmistr		Эстандарт-юнкер; Estandart-yunker	Подпрапорщик; Podpraporshchik	Младший унтер-офицер Mladshiy unter-ofitser	Рядовой старшего оклада Ryadovoy starshego oklada	Рядовой младшего оклада Ryadovoy mladshego oklada
Artillery ranks	-	Генерал-фельдцехмейстер; General-fel'dtsekhmeyster	Генерал от артиллерии General ot artillerii	Генерал-поручик; General-poruchik	Генерал-майор; General-mayor	-	Полковник; Polkovnik	Подполковник; Podpolkovnik	Майор; Mayor	Капитан; Kapitan	Штабс-капитан; Shtabs-kapitan	-	Поручик; Poruchik	Подпоручик; Podporuchik	-	Фельдфебель; Fel'dfebel'		Портупей-юнкер; Portupey-yunker	Подпрапорщик; Podpraporshchik	Фейерверкер; Feyerverker	Рядовой старшего оклада Ryadovoy starshego oklada	Рядовой младшего оклада Ryadovoy mladshego oklada
Engineer troops ranks	-	Генерал-фельдцехмейстер; General-fel'dtsekhmeyster	Генерал инженеров General inzhenerov	Генерал-поручик; General-poruchik	Генерал-майор; General-mayor	-	Полковник; Polkovnik	Подполковник; Podpolkovnik	Майор; Mayor	Капитан; Kapitan	Штабс-капитан; Shtabs-kapitan	-	Поручик; Poruchik	Подпоручик; Podporuchik	-	Фельдфебель; Fel'dfebel'		Портупей-юнкер; Portupey-yunker	Подпрапорщик; Podpraporshchik	Кондуктор; Konduktor	Рядовой старшего оклада Ryadovoy starshego oklada	Рядовой младшего оклада Ryadovoy mladshego oklada
Rank code	-						IV	V	VI	VII	VIII	IX	X	XI	XII	XIII	XIV					
Guard infantry ranks	-						Лейб-гвардии полковник Leyb-gvardii polkovnik	-		Лейб-гвардии капитан Leyb-gvardii kapitan	Лейб-гвардии штабс-капитан Leyb-gvardii shtabs-kapitan	-	Лейб-гвардии поручик Leyb-gvardii poruchik	Лейб-гвардии подпоручик Leyb-gvardii podporuchik	Лейб-гвардии прапорщик Leyb-gvardii praporshchik	-	Лейб-гвардии фельдфебель Leyb-gvardii fel'dfebel'	Лейб-гвардии портупей-прапорщик Leyb-gvardii portupey-praporshchik	Лейб-гвардии подпрапорщик Leyb-gvardii podpraporshchik	Лейб-гвардии млаший унтер-офицер Leyb-gvardii mladshiy unter-ofitser	Лейб-гвардии рядовой старшего оклада Leyb-gvardii ryadovoy starshego oklada	Лейб-гвардии рядовой младшего оклада Leyb-gvardii ryadovoy mladshego oklada
Guard cavalry ranks	-						Лейб-гвардии полковник Leyb-gvardii polkovnik	-		Лейб-гвардии ротмистр Leyb-gvardii rotmistr	Лейб-гвардии штаб-ротмистр Leyb-gvardii shtab-rotmistr	-	Лейб-гвардии поручик Leyb-gvardii poruchik	-	Лейб-гвардии корнет Leyb-gvardii kornet	-	Лейб-гвардии вахмистр Leyb-gvardii vakhmistr	Лейб-гвардии эстандарт-юнкер Leyb-gvardii estandart-yunker	Лейб-гвардии подпрапорщик Leyb-gvardii podpraporshchik	Лейб-гвардии млаший унтер-офицер Leyb-gvardii mladshiy unter-ofitser	Лейб-гвардии рядовой старшего оклада Leyb-gvardii ryadovoy starshego oklada	Лейб-гвардии рядовой младшего оклада Leyb-gvardii ryadovoy mladshego oklada

==== 1800–1826 ====
Rank group	General officers (Russian: Генералы, romanized: Generaly)					Field officers (Russian: Штаб-офицеры, romanized: Shtab-ofitsery)				Company officers (Russian: Обер-офицеры, romanized: Ober-ofitsery)						Non-commissioned officers (Russian: Унтер-офицеры, romanized: Unter-ofitsery)					Enlisted ranks (Russian: Нижние чины, romanized: Nizhniye Chiny)	
Rank code	I	II		III	IV	V	VI	VII	VIII	IX	X	XI	XII	XIII	XIV							
Infantry ranks	Генерал-фельдмаршал; General-fel'dmarshal	Генерал от инфатерии General ot infanterii		Генерал-лейтенант; General-leytenant	Генерал-майор; General-mayor	-	Полковник; Polkovnik	Подполковник; Podpolkovnik	Майор; Mayor	Капитан; Kapitan	Штабс-капитан; Shtabs-kapitan	-	Поручик; Poruchik	Подпоручик; Podporuchik	Прапорщик; Praporshchik	Фельдфебель; Fel'dfebel'		Портупей-прапорщик; Portupey-porshchik	Подпрапорщик; Podpraporshchik	Младший унтер-офицер Mladshiy Unter-ofitser	Рядовой; Ryadovoy	
Cavalry and Cossacks ranks	-	Генерал от кавалерии General ot kavalerii		Генерал-лейтенант; General-leytenant	Генерал-майор; General-mayor	-	Полковник; Polkovnik	Подполковник; Podpolkovnik	Майор; Mayor	Ротмистр; Rotmister	Штаб-ротмистр; Shtab-rotmistr	-	Поручик; Poruchik	-	Корнет; Kornet	Вахмистр; Vakhmistr		Эстандарт-юнкер; Estandart-yunker	Подпрапорщик; Podpraporshchik	Младший унтер-офицер Mladshiy Unter-ofitser	Рядовой; Ryadovoy	
Artillery ranks	-	Генерал-фельдцехмейстер; General-feldtsekhmeyster	Генерал от артиллерии General ot artillerii	Генерал-лейтенант; General-leytenant	Генерал-майор; General-mayor	-	Полковник; Polkovnik	Подполковник; Podpolkovnik	Майор; Mayor (Abolished in 1811)	Капитан; Kapitan	Штабс-капитан; Shtabs-kapitan	-	Поручик; Poruchik	Подпоручик; Podporuchik	Прапорщик; Praporshchik (Implement in 1811)	Фельдфебель; Fel'dfebel'		Портупей-юнкер; Portupey-yunker	Подпрапорщик; Podpraporshchik	Фейерверкер; Feyerverker	Рядовой; Ryadovoy	
Engineer troops ranks	-	Генерал-фельдцехмейстер; General-feldtsekhmeyster	Генерал инженеров General inzhenerov	Генерал-лейтенант; General-leytenant	Генерал-майор; General-mayor	-	Полковник; Polkovnik	Подполковник; Podpolkovnik	Майор; Mayor (Abolished in 1811)	Капитан; Kapitan	Штабс-капитан; Shtabs-kapitan	-	Поручик; Poruchik	Подпоручик; Podporuchik	Прапорщик; Praporshchik (Implement in 1811)	Фельдфебель; Fel'dfebel'		Портупей-юнкер; Portupey-yunker	Подпрапорщик; Podpraporshchik	Кондуктор; Konduktor	Рядовой; Ryadovoy	
Rank code	Old Guard (Units that became the Life Guards before 1813)						IV	V	VI	VII	VIII	IX	X	XI	XII	XIII	XIV					
Rank code	Young Guard (Units that became the Life Guards after 1813)						V	VI	VII	VIII	IX	X	XI	XII	XIII	XIV						
Guard infantry ranks	-						Лейб-гвардии полковник Leyb-gvardii polkovnik	-		Лейб-гвардии капитан Leyb-gvardii kapitan	Лейб-гвардии штабс-капитан Leyb-gvardii shtabs-kapitan	-	Лейб-гвардии поручик Leyb-gvardii poruchik	Лейб-гвардии подпоручик Leyb-gvardii podporuchik	Лейб-гвардии прапорщик Leyb-gvardii praporshchik	-	Лейб-гвардии фельдфебель Leyb-gvardii fel'dfebel'	Лейб-гвардии портупей-прапорщик Leyb-gvardii portupey-praporshchik	Лейб-гвардии подпрапорщик Leyb-gvardii podpraporshchik	Лейб-гвардии млаший унтер-офицер Leyb-gvardii mladshiy unter-ofitser	Лейб-гвардии рядовой старшего оклада Leyb-gvardii ryadovoy starshego oklada	Лейб-гвардии рядовой младшего оклада Leyb-gvardii ryadovoy mladshego oklada
Guard cavalry ranks	-						Лейб-гвардии полковник Leyb-gvardii polkovnik	-		Лейб-гвардии ротмистр Leyb-gvardii rotmistr	Лейб-гвардии штаб-ротмистр Leyb-gvardii shtab-rotmistr	-	Лейб-гвардии поручик Leyb-gvardii poruchik	-	Лейб-гвардии корнет Leyb-gvardii kornet	-	Лейб-гвардии вахмистр Leyb-gvardii vakhmistr	Лейб-гвардии эстандарт-юнкер Leyb-gvardii estandart-yunker	Лейб-гвардии подпрапорщик Leyb-gvardii podpraporshchik	Лейб-гвардии млаший унтер-офицер Leyb-gvardii mladshiy unter-ofitser	Лейб-гвардии рядовой старшего оклада Leyb-gvardii ryadovoy starshego oklada	Лейб-гвардии рядовой младшего оклада Leyb-gvardii ryadovoy mladshego oklada

==== 1826–1884 ====
Rank group	General officers (Russian: Генералы, romanized: Generaly)					Field officers (Russian: Штаб-офицеры, romanized: Shtab-ofitsery)				Company officers (Russian: Обер-офицеры, romanized: Ober-ofitsery)					Non-commissioned officers (Russian: Унтер-офицеры, romanized: Unter-ofitsery)					Enlisted ranks (Russian: Нижние чины, romanized: Nizhniye Chiny)	
Rank code	I	II		III	IV	V	VI	VII	VIII	IX	X	XI	XII	XIII	XIV						
Infantry Epaulettes						-								-		-					
Infantry shoulder board						-								-							
Infantry ranks	Генерал-фельдмаршал; General-fel'dmarshal	Генерал от инфатерии General ot infanteriy		Генерал-лейтенант; General-leytenant	Генерал-майор; General-mayor	-	Полковник; Polkovnik	Подполковник; Podpolkovnik	Майор; Mayor	Капитан; Kapitan	Штабс-капитан; Shtabs-kapitan	Поручик; Poruchik	Подпоручик; Podporuchik	-	Прапорщик; Praporshchik	Подпрапорщик; Podpraporshchik	Фельдфебель; Fel'dfebel'	Отдельный унтер-офицер Otdel'nyy unter-ofitser	Унтер-офицер; Unter-ofitser	Ефрейтор; Yefreytor	Рядовой; Ryadovoy
Cavalry ranks	-	Генерал от кавалерии General ot kavaleri'y		Генерал-лейтенант; General-leytenant	Генерал-майор; General-mayor	-	Полковник; Polkovnik	Подполковник; Podpolkovnik	Майор; Mayor	Ротмистр; Rotmistr	Штаб-ротмистр; Shtab-rotmistr	Поручик; Poruchik	-	-	Корнет; Kornet	Подпрапорщик; Podpraporshchik	Фельдфебель; Fel'dfebel'	Отдельный унтер-офицер Otdel'nyy unter-ofitser	Унтер-офицер; Unter-ofitser	Ефрейтор; Yefreytor	Рядовой; Ryadovoy
Cossacks ranks	-					-	Полковник; Polkovnik	-	Войсковой старшина Voyskovoy Starshina	Есаул; Yesaul	Подъесаул; Pod'yesaul	Сотник; Sotnik	-	-	Хорунжий; Khorunzhiy	Подхорунжий; Podkhorunzhiy	Вахмистр; Vakhmistr	Урядник; Uryadnik		Приказный; Prikaznyy	Казак; Kazak
Artillery ranks	-	Генерал-фельдцехмейстер; General-feldtzekhmeister	Генерал от артиллерии General ot artillerii	Генерал-лейтенант; General-leytenant	Генерал-майор; General-mayor	-	Полковник; Polkovnik	Подполковник; Podpolkovnik	Майор; Mayor	Капитан; Kapitan	Штабс-капитан; Shtabs-kapitan	Поручик; Poruchik	Подпоручик; Podporuchik	-	Прапорщик; Praporshchik	Фельдфебель; Fel'dfebel'	Портупей-юнкер; Portupey-junker	Подпрапорщик; Podpraporshchik	Фейерверкер; Feyerverker	Рядовой; Ryadovoy	
Engineer troops ranks	-	Генерал-фельдцехмейстер; General-feldtzekhmeister	Генерал инженеров General inzhenerov	Генерал-лейтенант; General-leytenant	Генерал-майор; General-mayor	-	Полковник; Polkovnik	Подполковник; Podpolkovnik	Майор; Mayor	Капитан; Kapitan	Штабс-капитан; Shtabs-kapitan	Поручик; Poruchik	Подпоручик; Podporuchik	-	Прапорщик; Praporshchik	Фельдфебель; Fel'dfebel'	Портупей-юнкер; Portupey-junker	Подпрапорщик; Podpraporshchik	Кондуктор; Konduktor	Рядовой; Ryadovoy	
Rank code	Old Guard (Units that became the Life Guards before 1813)						IV	V	VI	VII	VIII	IX	X	XI	XII	XIII	XIV				
Rank code	Young Guard (Units that became the Life Guards after 1813)						V	VI	VII	VIII	IX	X	XI	XII	XIII	XIV					
Guard infantry ranks	-						Лейб-гвардии полковник Leyb-gvardii polkovnik	-		Лейб-гвардии капитан Leyb-gvardii kapitan	Лейб-гвардии штабс-капитан Leiyb-gvardi'y shtabs-kapitan	Лейб-гвардии поручик Leyb-gvardii poruchik	Лейб-гвардии подпоручик Leyb-gvardii podporuchik	-	Лейб-гвардии прапорщик Leyb-gvardii praporshchik	-	Лейб-гвардии фельдфебель Leyb-gvardii fel'dfebel'	Лейб-гвардии отдельный унтер-офицер Leyb-gvardii otdel'ny unter-ofitser	Лейб-гвардии унтер-офицер Leyb-gvardii unter-ofitser	Лейб-гвардии Ефрейтор; Leyb-gvardii Yefreytor	Лейб-гвардии рядовой Leyb-gvardii ryadovoy
Guard cavalry ranks	-						Лейб-гвардии полковник Leyb-gvardii polkovnik	-		Лейб-гвардии ротмистр Leyb-gvardii rotmistr	Лейб-гвардии штаб-ротмистр Leiyb-gvardi'y shtab-rotmistr	Лейб-гвардии поручик Leyb-gvardii poruchik	-	-	Лейб-гвардии корнет Leyb-gvardii kornet	-	Лейб-гвардии вахмистр Leyb-gvardii vakhmistr	Лейб-гвардии отдельный унтер-офицер Leyb-gvardii otdel'ny unter-ofitser	Лейб-гвардии унтер-офицер Leyb-gvardii unter-ofitser	Лейб-гвардии Ефрейтор; Leyb-gvardii Yefreytor	Лейб-гвардии рядовой Leyb-gvardii ryadovoy
Rank code	-						III	IV	V	VI	VII	VIII	IX	X	XI	XII		XIII	XIV		
Palace Grenadier Company	-						Полковник; Polkovnik	-		Капитан; Kapitan	-	Поручик; Poruchik	Подпоручик; Podporuchik	-	Прапорщик; Praporshchik	Фельдфебель; Fel'dfebel'		-	Унтер-офицер; Unter-ofitser	Гренадёр 1-й статьи Grenadyor pervoy stat'i	Гренадёр 2-й статьи Grenadyor vtoroy stat'i

==== 1884–1917 ====
Rank group		General officers (Russian: Генералы, romanized: Generaly)					Field officers (Russian: Штаб-офицеры, romanized: Shtab-ofitsery)				Company officers (Russian: Обер-офицеры, romanized: Ober-ofitsery)							Non-commissioned officers (Russian: Унтер-офицеры, romanized: Unter-ofitsery)							Enlisted ranks (Russian: Нижние чины, romanized: Nizhniye Chiny)		
Rank code		I	II		III	IV	V	VI	VII		VIII	IX	X	XI	XII	XIII	XIV										
Infantry	Epaulettes						-								-	-		-									
Infantry	Shoulder boards (full dress)						-								-	-											
Infantry	Shoulder board (field or service uniform)						-								-	-											
Infantry	Ranks	Генерал-фельдмаршал; General-fel'dmarshal	Генерал от инфантерии General ot infanteriy		Генерал-лейтенант; General-leytenant	Генерал-майор; General-mayor	-	Полковник; Polkovnik	Подполковник; Podpolkovnik		Капитан; Kapitan	Штабс-капитан; Shtabs-kapitan	Поручик; Poruchik	Подпоручик; Podporuchik	-	-	Прапорщик; Praporshchik	Зауряд-прапорщик; Zauryad-praporshchik	Зауряд-прапорщик на должности фельдфебеля Zauryad-praporshchik na dolzhnosti fel'dfebelya	Подпрапорщик; Podpraporschik	Подпрапорщик на должности вахмистра Podpraporschik na dolzhnosti vakhmistra	Фельдфебель; Fel'dfebel'	Старший унтер-офицер Starshiy unter-ofitzer	Младший унтер-офицер Mladshiy unter-ofitzer	Ефрейтор; Yefreytor		Рядовой; Ryadovoy
Rank code		I	II		III	IV	V	VI	VII		VIII	IX	X	XI	XII	XIII	XIV										
Cavalry	Epaulettes	-					-							-		-	-										
Cavalry	Shoulder knots	-					-							-		-	-										
Cavalry	Shoulder straps	-					-							-		-											
Cavalry	Shoulder straps (field uniform)	-					-							-		-											
Cavalry	Ranks	-	Генерал от кавалерии General ot kavaleri'y		Генерал-лейтенант; General-leytenant	Генерал-майор; General-mayor	-	Полковник; Polkovnik	Подполковник; Podpolkovnik		Ротмистр; Rotmister	Штаб-ротмистр; Stab-rotmister	Поручик; Poruchik	-	Корнет; Kornet	-	Прапорщик; Praporschik (War time only)	Зауряд-прапорщик; Zauryad-praporshchik		Подпрапорщик; Podpraporschik	Подпрапорщик на должности вахмистра Podpraporschik na dolzhnosti vakhmistra	Вахмистр; Vakhmistr	Старший унтер-офицер Starshiy unter-ofitzer	Младший унтер-офицер Mladshiy unter-ofitzer	Ефрейтор; Yefreytor		Рядовой; Ryadovoy
Rank code		I	II		III	IV	V	VI	VII		VIII	IX	X	XI	XII	XIII	XIV										
Cossacks	Shoulder straps	-												-		-											
Cossacks	Shoulder straps (field uniform)	-												-		-											
Cossacks	Ranks	-						Полковник; Polkovnik	Войсковой старшина Voyskovoy starshina		Есаул; Yesaul	Подъесаул; Pod'yesaul	Сотник; Sotnik	-	Хорунжий; Khorunzhiy	-				Подхорунжий; Podkhorunzhiy		Вахмистр; Vakhmistr	Старший урядник Starshiy uryadnik	Младший урядник Mladshiy uryadnik	Приказный; Prikaznyy		Казак; Kazak
Rank code		I	II		III	IV	V	VI	VII		VIII	IX	X	XI	XII	XIII	XIV										
Artillery	Epaulettes	-					-								-			-									
Artillery	Shoulder straps	-					-								-												
Artillery	Shoulder straps (field uniform)	-					-								-												
Artillery	Ranks	-	Генерал-фельдцехмейстер; General-feldtzekhmeister	Генерал от артиллерии General ot artilleri'i	Генерал-лейтенант; General-leytenant	Генерал-майор; General-mayor	-	Полковник; Polkovnik	Подполковник; Podpolkovnik		Капитан; Kapitan	Штабс-капитан; Shtabs-kapitan	Поручик; Poruchik	Подпоручик; Podporuchik	-		Прапорщик; Praporshchik	Зауряд-прапорщик; Zauryad-praporshchik	Зауряд-прапорщик на должности фельдфебеля Zauryad-praporshchik na dolzhnosti fel'dfebelya	Подпрапорщик; Podpraporschik	Подпрапорщик на должности вахмистра Podpraporschik na dolzhnosti vakhmistra	Фельдфебель; Fel'dfebel'	Старший фейерверкер Starshiy feyerverker	Младший фейерверкер Mladshiy feyerverker	Бомбардир-наводчик; Bombardir-navodchik	Бомбардир; Bombardir	Канонир; Kananir
Rank code		I	II		III	IV	V	VI	VII		VIII	IX	X	XI	XII	XIII	XIV										
Engineer troops	Epaulettes	-					-								-			-									
Engineer troops	Shoulder straps	-					-								-												
Engineer troops	Shoulder straps (field uniform)	-					-								-												
Engineer troops	Ranks	-	Генерал-фельдцехмейстер; General-feldtzekhmeister	Генерал инженеров General inzhenerov	Генерал-лейтенант; General-leytenant	Генерал-майор; General-mayor	-	Полковник; Polkovnik	Подполковник; Podpolkovnik		Капитан; Kapitan	Штабс-капитан; Shtabs-kapitan	Поручик; Poruchik	Подпоручик; Podporuchik	-		Прапорщик; Praporshchik	Зауряд-прапорщик; Zauryad-praporshchik	Зауряд-прапорщик на должности фельдфебеля Zauryad-praporshchik na dolzhnosti fel'dfebelya	Подпрапорщик; Podpraporschik	Подпрапорщик на должности вахмистра Podpraporschik na dolzhnosti vakhmistra	Фельдфебель; Fel'dfebel'	Старший кондуктор Starshiy konduktor	Младший кондуктор Mladshiy konduktor	Бомбардир; Bombardir		Канонир; Kananir
Rank group		General officers (Russian: Генералы, romanized: Generaly)					Field officers (Russian: Штаб-офицеры, romanized: Shtab-ofitsery)				Company officers (Russian: Обер-офицеры, romanized: Ober-ofitsery)							Non-commissioned officers (Russian: Унтер-офицеры, romanized: Unter-ofitsery)							Enlisted ranks (Russian: Нижние чины, romanized: Nizhniye Chiny)		
Rank code								V	VI		VII	VIII	IX	X	XI	XII	XIII	XIV									
Guard Infantry	Epaulettes								-						-		(Reservist)	-									
Guard Infantry	Shoulder straps								-						-												
Guard Infantry	Shoulder straps (field uniform)								-						-												
Guard Infantry	Ranks							Лейб-гвардии полковник Leiyb-gvardi'y polkovnik	-		Лейб-гвардии капитан Leiyb-gvardi'y kapitan	Лейб-гвардии штабс-капитан Leiyb-gvardi'y shtabs-kapitan	Лейб-гвардии поручик Leiyb-gvardi'y poruchik	Лейб-гвардии подпоручик Leiyb-gvardi'y podporuchik	-		Лейб-гвардии прапорщик Leiyb-gvardi'y praporshchik)	Лейб-гвардии зауряд-прапорщик Leiyb-gvardi'y zauryad-praporshchik		Лейб-гвардии подпрапорщик Leiyb-gvardi'y podpraporschik		Лейб-гвардии фельдфебель Leiyb-gvardi'y fel'dfebel'	Лейб-гвардии старший унтер-офицер Leiyb-gvardi'y starshiy unter-ofitzer	Лейб-гвардии младший унтер-офицер Leiyb-gvardi'y mladshiy unter-ofitzer	Лейб-гвардии ефрейтор Leiyb-gvardi'y yefreytor		Лейб-гвардии рядовой Leiyb-gvardi'y ryadovoy
Rank code								V	VI		VII	VIII	IX	X	XI	XII	XIII	XIV									
Guard Cavalry	Epaulettes	-							-					-		-	-				-						
Guard Cavalry	Shoulder knots	-							-					-		-	-										
Guard Cavalry	Shoulder straps	-							-					-		-											
Guard Cavalry	Shoulder straps (field uniform)	-							-					-		-											
Guard Cavalry	Ranks	-						Лейб-гвардии полковник Leiyb-gvardi'y polkovnik	-		Лейб-гвардии ротмистр Leiyb-gvardi'y rotmister	Лейб-гвардии штаб-ротмистр Leiyb-gvardi'y stab-rotmister	Лейб-гвардии поручик Leiyb-gvardi'y poruchik	-	Лейб-гвардии корнет Leiyb-gvardi'y kornet	-	Лейб-гвардии прапорщик Leiyb-gvardi'y praporschik (War time only)	Лейб-гвардии зауряд-прапорщик Leiyb-gvardi'y zauryad-praporshchik	Лейб-гвардии зауряд-прапорщик на должности вахмистра Leiyb-gvardi'y zauryad-praporshchik na dolzhnosti vakhmistra	Лейб-гвардии подпрапорщик Leiyb-gvardi'y podpraporschik	Лейб-гвардии подпрапорщик на должности вахмистра Leiyb-gvardi'y podpraporschik na dolzhnosti vakhmistra	Лейб-гвардии вахмистр Leiyb-gvardi'y pakhmistr	Лейб-гвардии старший унтер-офицер Leiyb-gvardi'y starshiy unter-ofitzer	Лейб-гвардии младший унтер-офицер Leiyb-gvardi'y mladshiy unter-ofitzer	Лейб-гвардии ефрейтор Leiyb-gvardi'y yefreytor		Лейб-гвардии рядовой Leiyb-gvardi'y ryadovoy
Rank code								V	VI		VII	VIII	IX	X	XI		XII	XIII		XIV							
Guard Cossacks	Shoulder straps	-							-					-			-										
Guard Cossacks	Shoulder straps (field uniform)	-							-					-			-										
Guard Cossacks	Ranks	-						Лейб-гвардии полковник Leiyb-gvardi'y polkovnik	-		Лейб-гвардии есаул Leiyb-gvardi'y yesaul	Лейб-гвардии подъесаул Leiyb-gvardi'y pod'yesaul	Лейб-гвардии сотник Leiyb-gvardi'y sotnick	-	Лейб-гвардии хорунжий Leiyb-gvardi'y khorunzhiy		-			Лейб-гвардии подхорунжий Leiyb-gvardi'y podkhorunzhiy		Лейб-гвардии вахмистр Leiyb-gvardi'y vakhmistr	Лейб-гвардии старший урядник Leiyb-gvardi'y starshiy uryadnik	Лейб-гвардии младший урядник Leiyb-gvardi'y mladshiy uryadnick	Лейб-гвардии приказный Leiyb-gvardi'y prikaznyi		Лейб-гвардии казак Leiyb-gvardi'y kazak
Rank code		-						III	IV	V	VI	VII	VIII	IX			X	XI				XII	XIII		XIV		
Palace Grenadier Company	Shoulder straps	-							-			-		-								-					
Palace Grenadier Company	Shoulder straps (field uniform)	-							-			-		-													
Palace Grenadier Company	Ranks	-						Гвардии Полковник; Gvardi'y polkovnik	-		Гвардии капитан Gvardi'y kapitan	-	Гвардии поручик Gvardi'y poruchik	-								Фельдфебель; Fel'dfebel'	Унтер-офицер; Unter-ofitzer		Гренадёр первой статьи Grenadyor pervoy stat'i		Гренадёр второй статьи Grenadyor vtoroy stat'i

=== Other regiments and cadet corps ===
The following shoulder board insignias of the Imperial Army used by specific units and cadet corps are illustrated below:

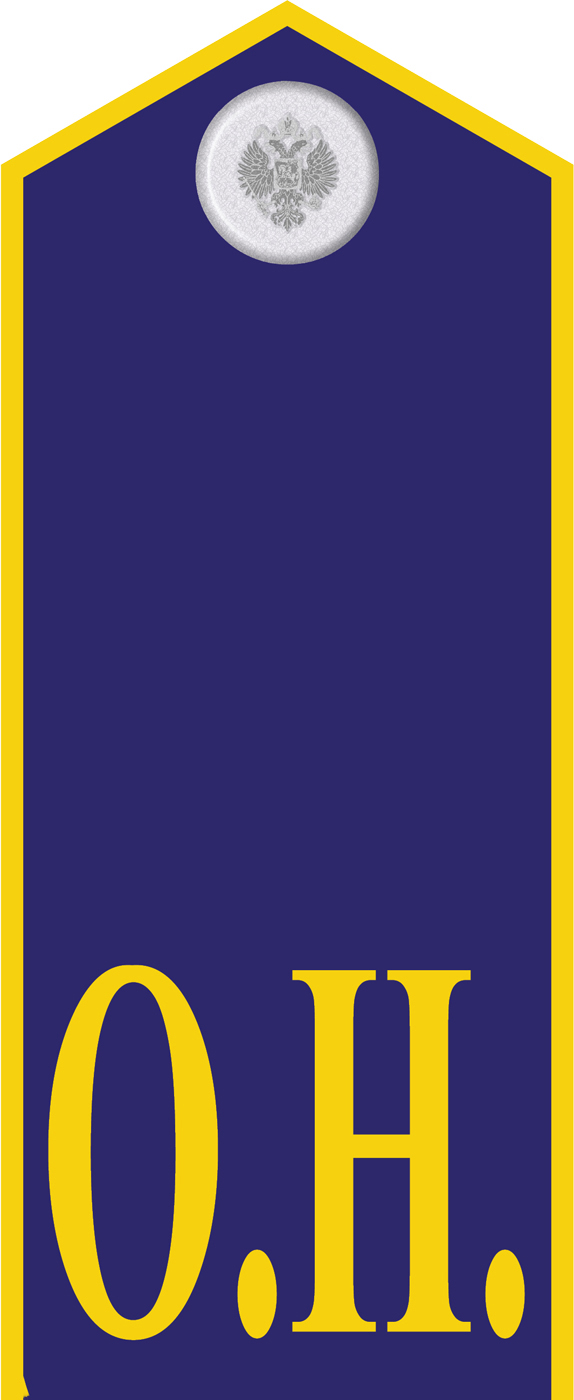
Orenburg Neplyuev Cadet Corps

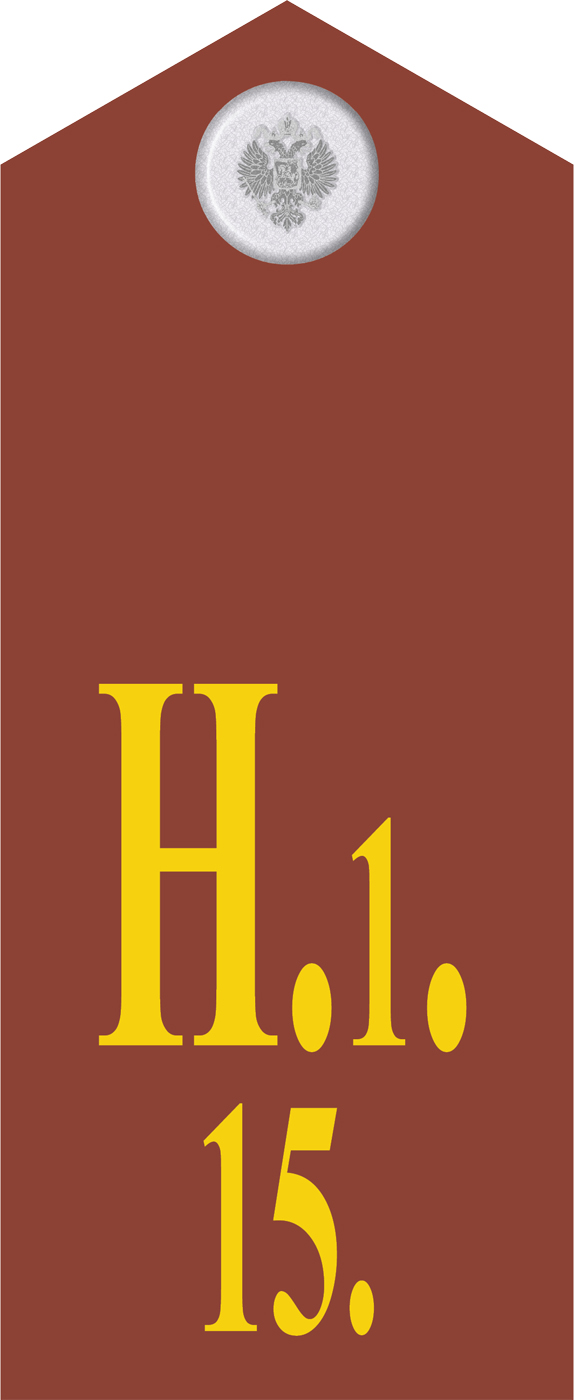
15th King Nikola I of Montenegro Rifle Regiment

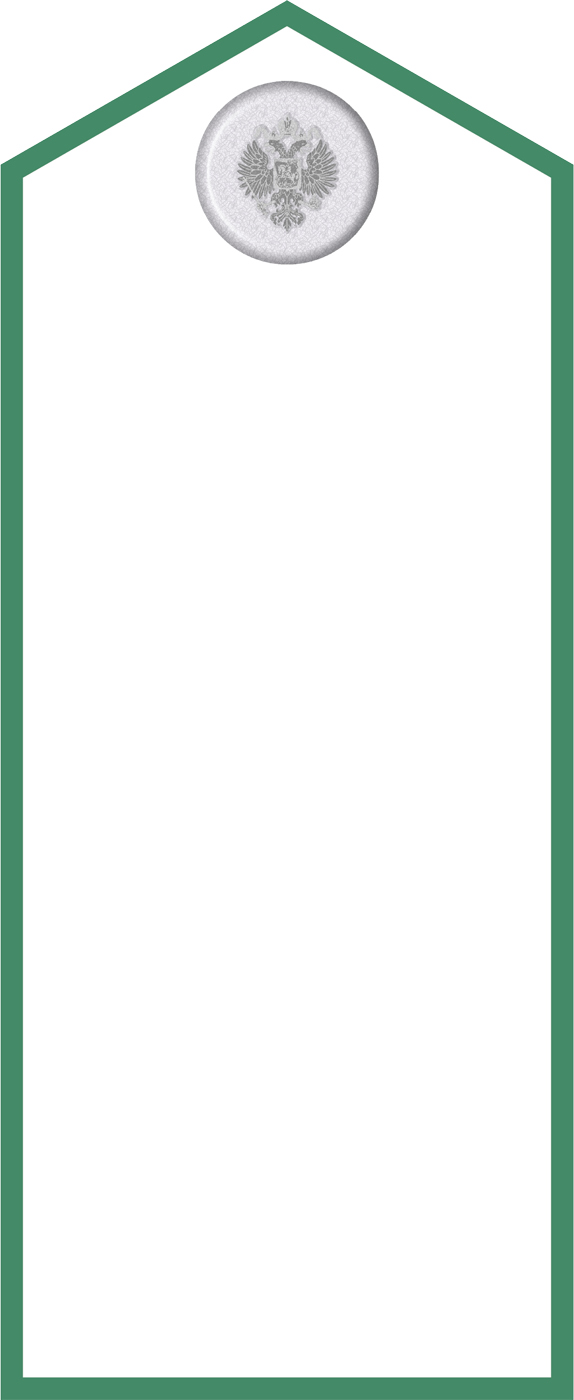
5th Kargopol Dragoon Regiment

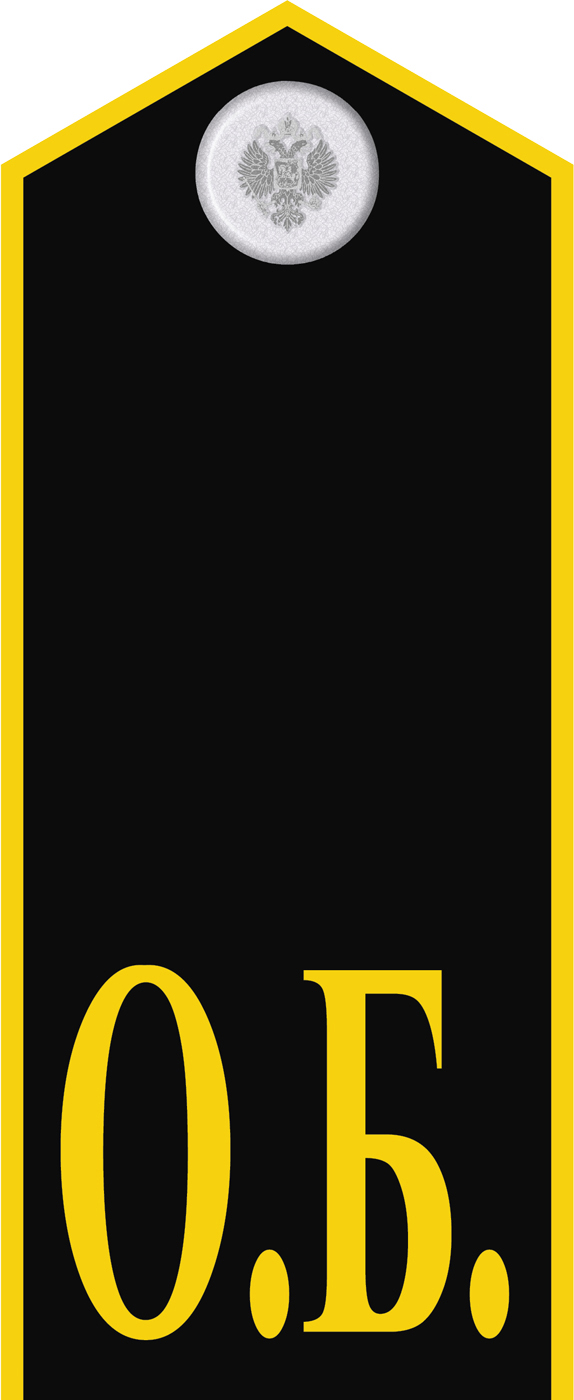
Oryol Cadet Corps

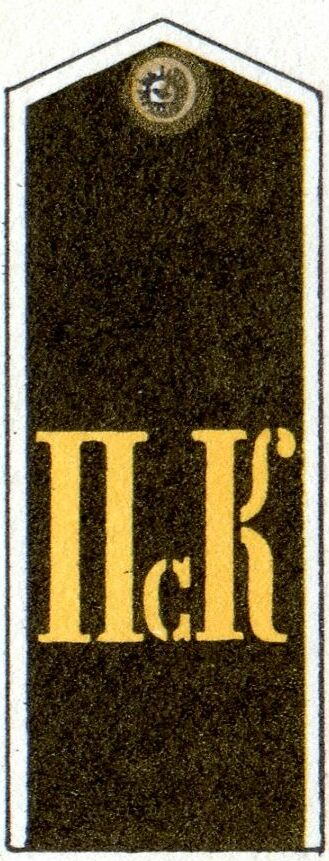
Pskov Cadet Corps

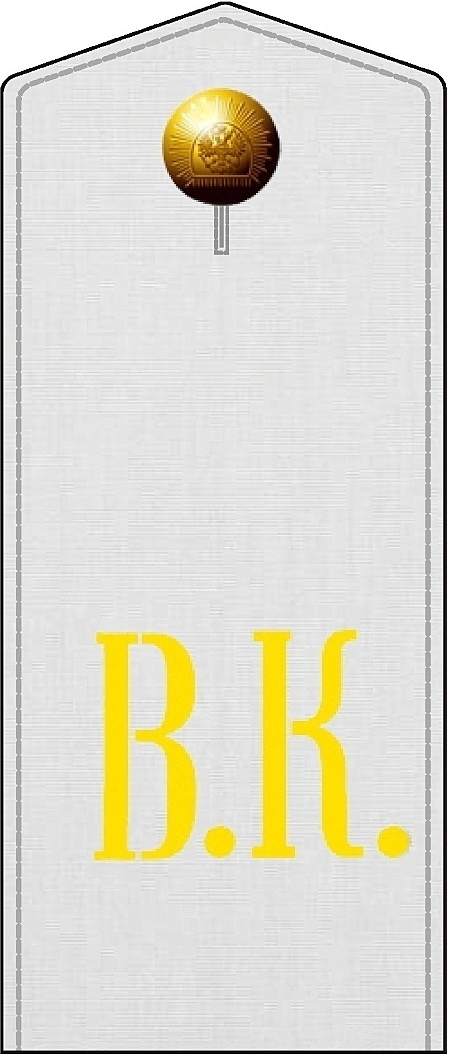
Grand Duke Vladimir Kiev Cadet Corps

== Naval ranks and rank insignia ==
=== 1696–1706 ===
Rank group	Flag officers (Russian: Флагманы, romanized: Flagmany)			Officers (Russian: Офицеры, romanized: Ofitzery)				
Ranks	Адмирал; Admiral	Вице-адмирал; Vitze-admiral	Шаутбейнахт; Shautbeynakht	Капитан; Kapitan	Лейтенант; Leytenant	Ундер-лейтенант; Under-leytenant	Корабельный секретарь Korabel'nyi' sekretar'	Корабельный комиссар Korabel'nyi' komissar

Rank group	-			-
Ranks	Штюрман; Shtyurman	Шхиман, Боцман, Шхипер, Констапель, Сержант от канонир Shkhiman, Bottzman, Konstapel', Serzhant ot kanonir	Квартирмейстер, Писарь, Корпорал, Подконстапель, Ланспасад, Ефрейтор; Kvartirmeyster, Pisar', Korporal, Podkonstapel', Lanspasad, Yefreytor	Матроз, Юнга, Трубач, Парусный ученик, Профос, Канонир, Констапельский ученик, Солдат, Караульный солдат, Конопатчик, Плотник, Купор, Ботелер; Matroz, Yunga, Trubach, Parusnyi' uchenik, Profos, Kanonir, Konstapel'ski'y, Soldat, Karaul'nyi' soldat, Konopatchik, Plotnik, Kupor, Boteler

=== 1706–1713 ===
Rank group	Flag officers (Russian: Флагманы, romanized: Flagmany)					Officers (Russian: Офицеры, romanized: Ofitzery)				
Ranks	Генерал-адмирал; General-admiral	Адмирал; Admiral	Вице-адмирал; Vitze-admiral	Шаутбейнахт; Shautbeynakht	Капитан командор Обер-сарваер; Kapitan komandor ober-servaer	Капитан; Серваер; Kapitan; Servaer	Лейтенант; Leytenant	Ундер-лейтенант; Under-leytenant	Корабельный секретарь Korabel'nyi' sekretar'	Корабельный комиссар Korabel'nyi' komissar

Rank group	-			Enlisted ranks (Russian: Нижние чины, romanized: Nizhniye Chiny)
Ranks	Штюрман; Shtyurman	Шхиман, Боцман, Шхипер, Констапель, Сержант от канонир Shkhiman, Bottzman, Konstapel', Serzhant ot kanonir	Квартирмейстер, Писарь, Корпорал, Подконстапель, Ланспасад, Ефрейтор; Kvartirmeyster, Pisar', Korporal, Podkonstapel', Lanspasad, Yefreytor	Матроз 4,3,2,1 статьи, Юнга, Трубач, Парусный ученик, Профос, Канонир, Констапельский ученик, Солдат, Караульный солдат, Конопатчик, Плотник, Купор, Ботелер; Matroz 4,3,2,1 stat'i, Yunga, Trubach, Parusnyi' uchenik, Profos, Kanonir, Konstapel'ski'y, Soldat, Karaul'nyi' soldat, Konopatchik, Plotnik, Kupor, Boteler

=== 1713–1720 ===
Rank group	Flag officers (Russian: Флагманы, romanized: Flagmany)				Officers (Russian: Офицеры, romanized: Ofitzery)								
Ranks	Генерал-адмирал; General-admiral	Адмирал; Admiral	Вице-адмирал; Vitze-admiral	Шаутбейнахт; Shautbeynakht	Капитан командор Kapitan komandor	Капитан 1 ранга Kapitan pervogo ranga	Капитан 2 ранга Kapitan vtorogo ranga	Капитан 3 ранга Kapitan tret'ego ranga	Капитан 4 ранга Kapitan chetvyortogo ranga	Капитан-лейтенант; Kapitan-leytenant	Лейтенант; Leytenant	Корабельный секретарь Korabel'nyi' sekretar'	Ундер-лейтенант; Under-leytenant

Rank group	Enlisted ranks (Russian: Нижние чины, romanized: Nizhniye Chiny)				
Ranks	Мичман; Michman	Штюрман; Shtyurman	Шхиман, Боцман, Шхипер, Констапель, Сержант от канонир Shkhiman, Bottzman, Konstapel', Serzhant ot kanonir	Квартирмейстер, Писарь, Корпорал, Подконстапель, Ланспасад, Ефрейтор; Kvartirmeyster, Pisar', Korporal, Podkonstapel', Lanspasad, Yefreytor	Матроз 4,3,2,1 статьи, Юнга, Трубач, Парусный ученик, Профос, Канонир, Констапельский ученик, Солдат, Караульный солдат, Конопатчик, Плотник, Купор, Ботелер; Matroz 4,3,2,1 stat'i, Yunga, Trubach, Parusnyi' uchenik, Profos, Kanonir, Konstapel'ski'y, Soldat, Karaul'nyi' soldat, Konopatchik, Plotnik, Kupor, Boteler

=== 1720–1722 ===
Rank group		Flag officers (Russian: Адмиралы, romanized: Admiraly)				
Ranks	Ship	Генерал-адмирал; General-admiral	Адмирал белого Флага, адмирал синего Флага, адмирал красного Флага; Admiral belogo flaga, admiral sinego flaga, admiral krasnogo flaga	Вице-адмирал белого флага, вице-адмирал синего флага, вице-адмирал красного флага Vitze-admiral belogo flaga, vitze-admiral sinego flaga, vitze-admiral krasnogo flaga	Шаутбейнахт белого флага, шаутбейнахт синего флага, шаутбейнахт красного флага Shautbeynakht belogo flaga, shautbeynakht sinego flaga, shautbeynakht krasnogo flaga	Капитан командор Kapitan komandor
Ranks	Artillery	-				Цейгмейстер; Tzei'gmei'ter
Ranks	Medical	-		Генерал Кригс Комисар; General Krigs Komisar	-	
Ranks	Rear services	-				Интендант; Intendant

Rank group		Officers (Russian: Офицеры, romanized: Ofitzery)							
Ranks	Ship	Капитан 1 ранга Kapitan pervogo ranga	Капитан 2 ранга Kapitan vtorogo ranga	Капитан 3 ранга Kapitan tret'ego ranga	Капитан-лейтенант; Kapitan-leytenant	Лейтенант (поручик); Leytenant (poruchik)	Ундер-лейтенант (подпоручик); Under-leytenant (podporuchik)	Cекретарь корабельный Sekretar' korabel'nyi'	-
Ranks	Artillery	-			Артилерный капитан Artilernyi' kapitan	Артилерный лейтенант Artilernyi' leytenant	Артилерный ундер-лейтенант Artilernyi' under-leytenant		
Ranks	Soldiers	Маэор; Maeor	Секунд-маэор; Sekund maeor	Капитан; Kapitan	-				
Ranks	Medical	Обер кригс комисар Ober krigs komisar	-			Доктор при флоте Doctor pri flote	Доктор; Doktor		
Ranks	Rear services	-							Комисар корабельный Komisar korabel'nyi'

Rank group		Non-commissioned officers (Russian: Унтер-офицеры, romanized: Unterofitsery)								Enlisted ranks (Russian: Нижние чины, romanized: Nizhniye Chiny)		
Ranks	Ship	Штюрман; Shtyurman	Шхипер 1 ранга Shkhiper pervogo ranga	Шхипер 2 ранга, Мичман; Shkhiper vtorogo ranga, Michman	Шхипер 3 ранга Shkhiper tret'ego ranga	Боцман; Botzmann	Шхиман; Shkhiman	Шхиманмат, Боцманмат, Подштюрман, Подшхипер; Shkhimanmat, botzmanmat, podshtyurman, podshkhiper	Квартирмейстер, Писарь; Kvartirmei'ster, pisar'	-	Матроc 1 статьи Matros pervoy stat'i	Матроc 2 статьи Matros vtoroy stat'i
Ranks	Artillery	Констапель 1 ранга, Обер констапель. Konstapel' pervogo ranga, ober konstapel			-	Констапель 2 ранга Konstapel' vtorogo ranga	Сержант от канонир, Констапель 3 ранга Serzhant ot kanonir, konstapel' tret'ego ranga	Корпорал от канонир, подконстапель Korporal ot kanonir, podkonstapel'		-	Канонир, констапельский ученик Kanonir, Konstapel'ski' uchenik	
Ranks	Soldiers	-						Корпорал; Korporal		Ефрейтор, ланспасад Yefrei'tor, landspasad	Солдат, караульный солдат Soldat, Karaul'nyi' soldat	
Ranks	Medical	Главный лекарь во флоте Glavnyi' lekar' vo flote			Лекарь; Lekar'			Подлекарь; Podlekar'		-	Лекарский ученик Lekar'skii' uchenik	
Ranks	Rear services	-						Ботелер, Купор; Boteler, Kupor		-	Десятник плотничий, парусный мастер, ружейный мастер, ундер-купор, ундер-ботелер Desyatnik plotnichii', parusnyi' master, ruzhei'nyi' master, under-boteler, under-kupor	Конопатчик, повар, плотник, добрый плотник, слесарь, Konopatchik, povar, plotnik, dobryi' plotnik, slesar'

=== 1722–1732 ===
Rank group	Flag officers (Russian: Адмиралы, romanized: Admiraly)			
Rank code	I	II	III	IV
Ranks	Генерал-адмирал; General-admiral	Адмирал; Admiral	Вице-адмирал, general krigs-komisar Vitze-admiral, general krigs-komisar	Шаутбейнахт, обер-цехмейстер Shautbeynakht, ober-tzekhmeyster

Rank group	Field officers (Russian: Штаб-офицеры, romanized: Shtabofitsery)				
Rank code	V	VI	VII	VIII	IX
Ranks	Капитан-командор, капитан над портом Кроншлот, обер-сарваер от строения корабельного, интендант, цехмейстер, обер-штер-кригскомисар Kapitan-komandor, kapitan nad portom Kronshlot, ober-sarvaer ot stroeniya korabel'nogo, intendant, tzekhmeyster, ober-shter-krigs-komisar	Капитан 1 ранга, капитан над портом, сарваер корабельный, прокурор, интендант партикулярной верфи в Петербурге, казначей, обер-провиантмейстер, обер-комисар Kapitan pervogo ranga, kapitan nad portom, sarvaer korabel'nyi', prokuror, intendant partikulyarnoy verfi v Peterburge, kaznachey, ober-proviantmeyster, ober-komisar	Капитан 2 ранга, контролёр Kapitan vtorogo ranga, kontrolyor	Капитан 3 ранга Kapitan tret'ego ranga	Капитан-лейтенант, галерный мастер Kapitan-leytenant, galernyi' master

Rank group	Field officers (Russian: Штаб-офицеры, romanized: Shtabofitsery)				
Rank code	X	XI	XII	XIII	XIV
Ranks	Лейтенант; Leytenant	Корабельный секретарь Korabel'nyi' sekretar'	Унтер-лейтенант, шкипер 1-го ранга Unter-leytenant, shkiper pervogo ranga	-	Корабельный комисар, шкипер 2-го ранга, констапель Korabel'nyi' komisar, shkiper vtorogo ranga, konstapel'

Rank group	Non-commissioned officers (Russian: Унтер-офицеры, romanized: Unterofitsery)						Enlisted ranks (Russian: Нижние чины, romanized: Nizhniye Chiny)	
Ranks	Штурман; Shturman	Мичман; Michman	Боцман; Botzman	Шхиман; Shkhiman	Шхиманмат, боцманмат, подшкипер, подштурман Shkhimanmat, botzmanmat, podshkiper, podshturman	Квартирмейстер, писарь Kvartirmei'ster, pisar	Матроc 1 статьи Matros pervoy stat'i	Матроc 2 статьи Matros vtoroy stat'i

=== 1732–1751 ===
Rank group	Flag officers (Russian: Флаг-офицеры, romanized: Flag ofitzery)				Field officers (Russian: Штаб-офицеры, romanized: Shtabofitsery)					Company officers (Russian: Обер-офицеры, romanized: Oberofitsery)				
Rank code	I	II	III	IV	V	VI	VII	VIII	IX	X	XI	XII	XIII	XIV
Ranks	Генерал-адмирал; General-admiral	Адмирал; Admiral	Вице-адмирал; Vitze-admiral	Контр-адмирал; Kontr-admiral	-	Капитан 1 ранга Kapitan pervogo ranga	Капитан 2 ранга Kapitan vtorogo ranga	Поручик; Poruchik	-	-	Корабельный секретарь Korabel'nyi' sekretar'	Унтер-лейтенант; Unter-leytenant	-	-

Rank group	Non-commissioned officers (Russian: Унтер-офицеры, romanized: Unterofitsery)					Enlisted ranks (Russian: Нижние чины, romanized: Nizhniye Chiny)	
Ranks	Штурман; Shturman	Мичман; Michman	Боцман, шхиман, шкипер Botzman, shkhiman, shkiper	Боцманмат, шхиманмат, подштурман, подшкипер Botzmanmat, shkhimanmat, podshturman, podshkiper	Квартирмейстер; Kvartirmei'ster	Матроc 1 статьи Matros pervoy stat'i	Матроc 2 статьи Matros vtoroy stat'i

=== 1751–1758 ===
Rank group	Flag officers (Russian: Флаг-офицеры, romanized: Flag ofitzery)				Field officers (Russian: Штаб-офицеры, romanized: Shtabofitsery)						Company officers (Russian: Обер-офицеры, romanized: Oberofitsery)					Non-commissioned officers (Russian: Унтер-офицеры, romanized: Unterofitsery)					Enlisted ranks (Russian: Нижние чины, romanized: Nizhniye Chiny)	
Rank code	I	II	III	IV	V	VI	VII	VIII		IX	X	XI	XII	XIII	XIV							
Ranks	Генерал-адмирал; General-admiral	Адмирал; Admiral	Вице-адмирал; Vitze-admiral	Контр-адмирал; Kontr-admiral	Капитан-командор; Kapitan-komandor	Капитан 1 ранга Kapitan pervogo ranga	Капитан 2 ранга Kapitan vtorogo ranga	Капитан 3 ранга Kapitan tret'ego ranga	Поручик; Poruchik	-	-	Корабельный секретарь Korabel'nyi' sekretar'	Унтер-лейтенант; Unter-leytenant	-	-	Штурман, шхипер Shturman, shkhiper	Мичман; Michman	Боцман, шхиман Botzman, shkhiman	Боцманмат, шхиманмат, подштурман, подшкипер Botzmanmat, shkhimanmat, podshturman, podshkiper	Квартирмейстер; Kvartirmei'ster	Матроc 1 статьи Matros pervoy stat'i	Матроc 2 статьи Matros vtoroy stat'i

=== 1758–1764 ===
Rank group	Flag officers (Russian: Флаг-офицеры, romanized: Flag ofitzery)				Field officers (Russian: Штаб-офицеры, romanized: Shtabofitsery)						Company officers (Russian: Обер-офицеры, romanized: Oberofitsery)					Non-commissioned officers (Russian: Унтер-офицеры, romanized: Unterofitsery)					Enlisted ranks (Russian: Нижние чины, romanized: Nizhniye Chiny)	
Rank code	I	II	III	IV	V	VI	VII	VIII		IX	X	XI	XII	XIII	XIV							
Ranks	Генерал-адмирал; General-admiral	Адмирал; Admiral	Вице-адмирал; Vitze-admiral	Контр-адмирал; Kontr-admiral	Капитан-командор; Kapitan-komandor	Капитан 1 ранга Kapitan pervogo ranga	Капитан 2 ранга Kapitan vtorogo ranga	Капитан 3 ранга Kapitan tret'ego ranga	Поручик; Poruchik	-	-	Корабельный секретарь Korabel'nyi' sekretar'	Унтер-лейтенант; Unter-leytenant	Мичман; Michman	-	Штурман, шхипер Shturman, shkhiper	Мичман; Michman	Боцман; Botzman	Боцманмат; Botzmanmat	Квартирмейстер; Kvartirmei'ster	Матроc 1 статьи Matros pervoy stat'i	Матроc 2 статьи Matros vtoroy stat'i

=== 1764–1798 ===
Rank group	Flag officers (Russian: Флаг-офицеры, romanized: Flag ofitzery)				Field officers (Russian: Штаб-офицеры, romanized: Shtabofitsery)				Company officers (Russian: Обер-офицеры, romanized: Oberofitsery)						Non-commissioned officers (Russian: Унтер-офицеры, romanized: Unterofitsery)		Enlisted ranks (Russian: Нижние чины, romanized: Nizhniye Chiny)			
Rank code	I	II	III	IV	V	VI	VII	VIII	IX	X	XI	XII	XIII	XIV						
Ranks	Генерал-адмирал; General-admiral	Адмирал; Admiral	Вице-адмирал; Vitze-admiral	Контр-адмирал; Kontr-admiral	Капитан бригадного ранга Kapitan brigadnogo ranga	Капитан 1 ранга Kapitan pervogo ranga	Капитан 2 ранга Kapitan vtorogo ranga	Капитан-поручик; Kapitan-poruchik	Поручик; Poruchik	-	-	Мичман; Michman	-	-	Шхипер; Shkhiper	Унтер-офицер; Unter-ofitzer	Матроc 1 статьи Matros pervoy stat'i	Матроc 2 статьи Matros vtoroy stat'i	Матроc 3 статьи Matros tret'ey stat'i	Матроc 4 статьи Matros chetvyortoy stat'i

=== 1798–1827 ===
Rank group	Flag officers (Russian: Флаг-офицеры, romanized: Flag ofitzery)				Field officers (Russian: Штаб-офицеры, romanized: Shtabofitsery)				Company officers (Russian: Обер-офицеры, romanized: Oberofitsery)						Non-commissioned officers (Russian: Унтер-офицеры, romanized: Unterofitsery)				Enlisted ranks (Russian: Нижние чины, romanized: Nizhniye Chiny)	
Rank code	I	II	III	IV	V	VI	VII	VIII	IX	X	XI	XII	XIII	XIV						
Shoulder straps 1803-1807					Admiral Collar			Left shoulder pad only	-		-	Officer collar without shoulder pads	-	-	NCO collar				Enlisted collar	
Ranks	Генерал-адмирал; General-admiral	Адмирал; Admiral	Вице-адмирал; Vitze-admiral	Контр-адмирал; Kontr-admiral	Капитан-командор; Kapitan-komandor	Капитан 1 ранга Kapitan pervogo ranga	Капитан 2 ранга Kapitan vtorogo ranga	Капитан-лейтенант; Kapitan-leitenant	-	Лейтенант; Leitenant	-	Мичман; Michman	-	-	Кондуктор; Konduktor	Боцман; Botzman	Боцманмат; Botzmanmat	Квартирмейстер; Kvartirmeister	Матроc 1 статьи Matros pervoy stat'i	Матроc 2 статьи Matros vtoroy stat'i

=== 1827–1884 ===
Rank group		Flag officers (Russian: Флаг-офицеры, romanized: Flag ofitzery)				Field officers (Russian: Штаб-офицеры, romanized: Shtabofitsery)				Company officers (Russian: Обер-офицеры, romanized: Oberofitsery)						Non-commissioned officers (Russian: Унтер-офицеры, romanized: Unterofitsery)				Enlisted ranks (Russian: Нижние чины, romanized: Nizhniye Chiny)	
Rank code		I	II	III	IV	V	VI	VII	VIII	IX	X	XI	XII	XIII	XIV						
Maritime service	Epaulettes 1830-1855					-				-		-									
Maritime service	Epaulettes 1855-1904					-				-		-									
Maritime service	Ranks	Генерал-адмирал; General-admiral	Адмирал; Admiral	Вице-адмирал; Vitze-admiral	Контр-адмирал; Kontr-admiral	-	Капитан 1 ранга Kapitan pervogo ranga	Капитан 2 ранга Kapitan vtorogo ranga	Капитан-лейтенант; Kapitan-leitenant	-	Лейтенант; Leitenant	-	Мичман; Michman	Гардемарин; Gardemarin		Кондуктор; Konduktor	Боцман; Botzman	Боцманмат; Botzmanmat	Квартирмейстер; Kvartirmeister	Матроc 1 статьи Matros pervoy stat'i	Матроc 2 статьи Matros vtoroy stat'i
Rank code		I	II	III	IV	V	VI	VII	VIII	IX	X	XI	XII	XIII	XIV						
Shore Establishment and Marines	Epaulettes 1830-1855					-								-							
Shore Establishment and Marines	Epaulettes 1855-1867					-								-							
Shore Establishment and Marines	Epaulettes 1867-1904					-								-							
Shore Establishment and Marines	Ranks		Генерал; General	Генерал-лейтенант; General-lei'tenant	Генерал-майор; General-mai'or	-	Полковник; Polkovnik	Подполковник; Podpolkovnik	Майор; Mai'or	Капитан; Kapitan	Штабс-капитан; Shtabs-kapitan	Поручик; Poruchik	Подпоручик; Podporuchik	-	Прапорщик; Praporschik	Кондуктор; Konduktor	Боцман; Botzman	Боцманмат; Botzmanmat	Квартирмейстер; Kvartirmeister	Матроc 1 статьи Matros pervoy stat'i	Матроc 2 статьи Matros vtoroy stat'i

=== 1884–1907 ===
Rank group			Flag officers (Russian: Флаг-офицеры, romanized: Flag ofitzery)				Field officers (Russian: Штаб-офицеры, romanized: Shtabofitsery)			Company officers (Russian: Обер-офицеры, romanized: Oberofitsery)								Non-commissioned officers (Russian: Унтер-офицеры, romanized: Unterofitsery)					Enlisted ranks (Russian: Нижние чины, romanized: Nizhniye Chiny)	
Rank code			I	II	III	IV	V	VI	VII	VIII		IX	X	XI	XII	XIII	XIV							
Maritime service		Epaulets					-			-				-				-						
Maritime service		Shoulder board					-			-				-										
Maritime service		Ranks	Генерал-адмирал; General-admiral	Адмирал; Admiral	Вице-адмирал; Vitze-admiral	Контр-адмирал; Kontr-admiral	-	Капитан 1 ранга Kapitan pervogo ranga	Капитан 2 ранга Kapitan vtorogo ranga	-		Лейтенант; Leitenant	Мичман; Michman	-				Кондуктор; Konduktor		Боцман; Botzman	Боцманмат; Botzmanmat	Квартирмейстер; Kvartirmeister	Матроc 1 статьи Matros pervoy stat'i	Матроc 2 статьи Matros vtoroy stat'i
Rank code			I	II	III	IV	V	VI	VII	VIII	IX	X	XI	XII		XIII	XIV							
Shore Establishment and Marines	Officers renamed to these ranks from officers of the Navy and Corps of the Maritime Department or other departments.	Epaulets Form 1904	-				-							-				-						
Shore Establishment and Marines	Officers renamed to these ranks from officers of the Navy and Corps of the Maritime Department or other departments.	Shoulder board Form 1904	-				-							-										
Shore Establishment and Marines	Officers made from lower ranks and from pupils of naval educational institutions "for lack of success in the sciences"	Epaulets Form 1904	-				-							-				-						
Shore Establishment and Marines	Officers made from lower ranks and from pupils of naval educational institutions "for lack of success in the sciences"	Shoulder board Form 1904	-				-							-										
Shore Establishment and Marines	Ranks		-	Флота генерал Flota general	Флота генерал-лейтенант Flota general-lei'tenant	Флота генерал-майор Flota general-mai'or	-	Полковник по адмиралтейству Polkovni po admiraltei'stvu	Подполковник по адмиралтейству Podpolkovnik po admiraltei'stvu	Капитан по адмиралтейству Kapitan po admiraltei'stvu	Штабс-капитан по адмиралтейству Shtabs-kapitan po admiraltei'stvu	Поручик по адмиралтейству Poruchik po admiraltei'stvu	Подпоручик по адмиралтейству Podporuchik po admiraltei'stvu	-			Прапорщик по адмиралтейству praporschik po admiraltei'stvu	Морской зауряд-прапорщик Morskoi' zauryad-praporschik	Морской подпрапорщик Morskoi' podpraporschik	Морской Фельдфебель; Morskoi' fel'dfebel'	Морской старший унтер-офицер Morskoi' starshii' unter-ofitzer	Морской младший унтер-офицер Morskoi' mladshii' unter-ofitzer	Морской ефрейтор Morskoi' efrei'tor	Морской солдат Morskoi' soldat
Rank code			I	II	III	IV	V	VI	VII	VIII		IX	X	XI	XII	XIII	XIV							
Mechanics Engineer & Ship Engineer	Shoulder boards 1886-1892		-				-			-				-										
Mechanics Engineer & Ship Engineer	Shoulder boards Mechanics Engineer 1892-1905 Ship Engineer 1892-1908		-				-			-				-										
Mechanics Engineer & Ship Engineer	Epaulets Mechanics Engineer 1892-1905 Ship Engineer 1892-1908		-				-			-				-										
Mechanics Engineer & Ship Engineer	Mechanics Engineer Ranks		-			Инспектор механической части Inspektor mekhanicheskoi' chasti	-	Флагманский инженер-механик Flagmanski' injener-mekhanik	Старший инженер-механик Starshii' injener-mekhanik	-		Помощник старшего инженер-механика Pomoshnik starshego injener-mekhanik	Младший инженер-механик Mladshii' injener-mekhanik	-										
Mechanics Engineer & Ship Engineer	Ship Engineer ranks		-			Инспектор судостроения Inspektor sudostroeniya	-	Старший судостроитель Starshii' sudostroitel'	Младший судостроитель Mladshii' sudostroitel'	-		Старший помощник судостроителя Starshii' pomoschnik sudostroitelya	Младший помощник судостроителя Mladshii' pomoschnik sudostroitelya	-										

=== 1907–1911 ===
Rank group			Flag officers (Russian: Флаг-офицеры, romanized: Flag ofitzery)				Field officers (Russian: Штаб-офицеры, romanized: Shtabofitsery)				Company officers (Russian: Обер-офицеры, romanized: Oberofitsery)									Non-commissioned officers (Russian: Унтер-офицеры, romanized: Unterofitsery)					Enlisted ranks (Russian: Нижние чины, romanized: Nizhniye Chiny)	
Rank code			I	II	III	IV	V	VI	VII	VIII	IX			X		XI	XII	XIII	XIV							
Maritime service	Epaulettes						-							after 1909	until 1909											
Maritime service	Shoulder board						-							after 1909	until 1909											
Maritime service	Ranks		Генерал-адмирал; General-admiral	Адмирал; Admiral	Вице-адмирал; Vitze-admiral	Контр-адмирал; Kontr-admiral	-	Капитан 1 ранга Kapitan pervogo ranga	Капитан 2 ранга Kapitan vtorogo ranga	Капитан-лейтенант; Kapitan-leitenant	Старший лейтенант Starshii' leitenant		Лейтенант; Leitenant	Мичман; Michman						Кондуктор; Konduktor		Боцман; Botzman	Боцманмат; Botzmanmat	Квартирмейстер; Kvartirmeister	Матроc 1 статьи Matros pervoy stat'i	Матроc 2 статьи Matros vtoroy stat'i
Rank code			I	II	III	IV	V	VI	VII		VIII	IX	X	XI		XII	XIII	XIV								
Shore Establishment and Marines	Officers renamed to these ranks from officers of the Navy and Corps of the Maritime Department or other departments.	Epaulets					-																			
Shore Establishment and Marines	Officers renamed to these ranks from officers of the Navy and Corps of the Maritime Department or other departments.	Shoulder board					-																			
Shore Establishment and Marines	Officers made from lower ranks and from pupils of naval educational institutions "for lack of success in the sciences"	Epaulets					-																			
Shore Establishment and Marines	Officers made from lower ranks and from pupils of naval educational institutions "for lack of success in the sciences"	Shoulder board					-																			
Shore Establishment and Marines	Ranks			Флота генерал Flota general	Флота генерал-лейтенант Flota general-lei'tenant	Флота генерал-майор Flota general-mai'or	-	Полковник по адмиралтейству Polkovni po admiraltei'stvu	Подполковник по адмиралтейству Podpolkovnik po admiraltei'stvu		Капитан по адмиралтейству Kapitan po admiraltei'stvu	Штабс-капитан по адмиралтейству Shtabs-kapitan po admiraltei'stvu	Поручик по адмиралтейству Poruchik po admiraltei'stvu	Подпоручик по адмиралтейству Podporuchik po admiraltei'stvu				Прапорщик по адмиралтейству praporschik po admiraltei'stvu		Морской зауряд-прапорщик Morskoi' zauryad-praporschik	Морской подпрапорщик Morskoi' podpraporschik	Морской Фельдфебель; Morskoi' fel'dfebel'	Морской старший унтер-офицер Morskoi' starshii' unter-ofitzer	Морской младший унтер-офицер Morskoi' mladshii' unter-ofitzer	Морской ефрейтор Morskoi' efrei'tor	Морской солдат Morskoi' soldat
Rank code			I	II	III	IV	V	VI	VII		VIII		IX	X	XI	XII	XIII	XIV								
Mechanics Engineer	Epaulets						-																			
Mechanics Engineer	Shoulder boards						-																			
Mechanics Engineer	Ranks					Инспектор механической части Inspektor mekhanicheskoi' chasti	-	Полковник; Polkovnikh	Подполковник; Podpolkovnikh		Капитан; Kapitan	Штабс-капитан; Shtabs-kapitan	Поручик; Poruchik													
Ship Engineer	Epaulets						-																			
Ship Engineer	Shoulder boards						-																			
Ship Engineer	Ranks				Генерал-лейтенант; General-lei'tenant	Генерал-майор; General-mai'or	-	Полковник; Polkovnikh	Подполковник; Podpolkovnikh		Капитан; Kapitan	Штабс-капитан; Shtabs-kapitan	Поручик; Poruchik													

=== 1911–1917 ===
Rank group		Flag officers (Russian: Флаг-офицеры, romanized: Flag ofitzery)				Field officers (Russian: Штаб-офицеры, romanized: Shtabofitsery)			Company officers (Russian: Обер-офицеры, romanized: Oberofitsery)								Non-commissioned officers (Russian: Унтер-офицеры, romanized: Unterofitsery)					Enlisted ranks (Russian: Нижние чины, romanized: Nizhniye Chiny)	
Rank code		I	II	III	IV	V	VI	VII	VIII		IX	X	XI	XII	XIII	XIV							
Maritime service	Epaulettes																						
Maritime service	Shoulder board																						
Maritime service	Ranks	Генерал-адмирал; General-admiral	Адмирал; Admiral	Вице-адмирал; Vitze-admiral	Контр-адмирал; Kontr-admiral		Капитан 1 ранга Kapitan pervogo ranga	Капитан 2 ранга Kapitan vtorogo ranga	Старший лейтенант Starshii' leitenant		Лейтенант; Leitenant	Мичман; Michman					Кондуктор; Konduktor		Боцман; Botzman	Боцманмат; Botzmanmat	Квартирмейстер; Kvartirmeister	Матроc 1 статьи Matros pervoy stat'i	Матроc 2 статьи Matros vtoroy stat'i
Rank code		I	II	III	IV	V	VI	VII	VIII	IX	X	XI	XII	XIII	XIV								
Shore Establishment and Marines	Epaulets																						
Shore Establishment and Marines	Shoulder board																						
Shore Establishment and Marines	Ranks		Флота генерал Flota general	Флота генерал-лейтенант Flota general-lei'tenant	Флота генерал-майор Flota general-mai'or		Полковник по адмиралтейству Polkovni po admiraltei'stvu	Подполковник по адмиралтейству Podpolkovnik po admiraltei'stvu	Капитан по адмиралтейству Kapitan po admiraltei'stvu	Штабс-капитан по адмиралтейству Shtabs-kapitan po admiraltei'stvu	Поручик по адмиралтейству Poruchik po admiraltei'stvu	Подпоручик по адмиралтейству Podporuchik po admiraltei'stvu			Прапорщик по адмиралтейству praporschik po admiraltei'stvu		Морской зауряд-прапорщик Morskoi' zauryad-praporschik	Морской подпрапорщик Morskoi' podpraporschik	Морской Фельдфебель; Morskoi' fel'dfebel'	Морской старший унтер-офицер Morskoi' starshii' unter-ofitzer	Морской младший унтер-офицер Morskoi' mladshii' unter-ofitzer	Морской ефрейтор Morskoi' efrei'tor	Морской солдат Morskoi' soldat
Rank code		I	II	III	IV	V	VI	VII	VIII		IX	X	XI	XII	XIII	XIV							
Mechanics Engineer	Epaulets																						
Mechanics Engineer	Shoulder boards																						
Mechanics Engineer	Ranks			Инженер-механик-вице-адмирал; Inzhener-mekhanikov-vitze-admiral	Инженер-механик-контр-адмирал; Inzhener-mekhanikov-kontr-admiral		Инженер-механик-капитан 1 ранга Inzhener-mekhanikov-kapitan pervogo ranga	Инженер-механик-капитан 2 ранга Inzhener-mekhanikov-kapitan vtorogo ranga	Инженер-механик-старший лейтенант Inzhener-mekhanikov-starshii' lei'tenant		Инженер-механик-лейтенант; Inzhener-mekhanikov-lei'tenant	Инженер-механик-мичман; Inzhener-mekhanikov-michman											
Rank code		I	II	III	IV	V	VI	VII	VIII	IX	X	XI	XII	XIII	XIV								
Ship Engineer	Epaulets																						
Ship Engineer	Shoulder boards																						
Ship Engineer	Ranks			Генерал-лейтенант; General-lei'tenant	Генерал-майор; General-mai'or		Полковник; Polkovnikh	Подполковник; Podpolkovnikh	Капитан; Kapitan	Штабс-капитан; Shtabs-kapitan	Поручик; Poruchik	Подоручик; Podporuchik											

=== Sleeve insignia of the Russian Navy from 1917 ===
By order No. 125 of the Navy Ministry of the Russian Provisional Government, from April 16, 1917, was provided:

1. Abolishment of the hitherto used shoulder rank insignia.
2. Abolishment of the (naval) scarf.
3. Deletion of any monogram, or initial letter on weapons and equipment.
4. Paint over of the cockade center on caps with red color, until availability of the peaked cap with new national emblem.

The traditional shoulder rank insignia were replaced by golden sleeve strips for naval officers, admiralty officers, and naval engineers, as well as – after completion of mandatory examinations – praporshchiks and officers of the hydrographical service.

Silver sleeve strips were introduced to officers of the admiralty staff, before completion of mandatory examinations, as well to ship engineers, officials of the naval administration and naval physicians with officer rank or status.

Both cuff insignias were used in uniforms with the executive curl.

As discrimination criteria to specific appointments or assignments additional corps colours on the lower part of sleeve stripes was determinate:

- red = ship engineers;
- raspberry coloured = naval administration;
- dark blue = hydrographical service;
- white = physicians

The table below shows examples of rank insignia of the Russian Navy, to be worn on the lower part of uniform cuffs, as to the order No. 125 of the Russian Navy Ministry from April 16, 1917.

Rank group	Flag officers					Staff officers		Ober officers
Rank code	I	II	III	IV	V	VI	VII	VIII	IX	X	XI	XII	XIII	XIV
Sleeve insignia	-										-		-
Maritime service	-	Адмирал; Admiral	Вице-адмирал; Vitse-admiral	Контр-адмирал; Contre-admiral	-	Капитан 1-го ранга Kapitan 1-go ranga	Капитан 2-го ранга Kapitan 2-go ranga	Старший лейтенант Starshey leytenant	Лейтенант; Leytenant	Мичман; Michman	-	-	-	-
Shore Establishment and Marines	-	Генерал; General	Генерал-лейтенант; General-lei'tenant	Генерал-майор; General-mai'or	-	Полковник; Polkovnik	Подполковник; Podpolkovnik	Капитан; Kapitan	Штабс-капитан; Shtabs-kapitan	Поручик; Poruchik	-	Подпоручик; Podporuchik	-	Прапорщик; Praporshchik
Civil Administration	-	Действительный тайный советник Dei'stvitel'nyi' tai'nyi' sovetnik	Тайный советник Tai'nyi' sovetnik	Действительный статский советник Dei'stvitel'nyi' statskii' sovetnik	Статский советник Statskii' sovetnik	Коллежский советник Kolezhskii' sovetnik	Надворный советник Nadvornyi' sovetnik	Коллежский асессор Kolezhskii' asessor	Титулярный советник Titulyarnyi' sovetnik	Коллежский секретарь Kolezhskii' sekretar'	-	Губернский секретарь Gubernskii' sekretar'	-	Коллежский регистратор Kolezhskii' registrator

== See also ==
- History of Russian military ranks
- Ranks and insignia of the White Movement
- Ranks and insignia of the Red Army and Navy 1918–1935, ... 1935–1940, and ... 1940–1943
- Ranks and insignia of the Soviet Armed Forces 1943–1955 and ... 1955–1991
- Ranks and insignia of the Russian Federation's armed forces 1994–2010
