= Second major =

Second major most commonly refers to:

- Second major (rank), a military rank
- Double degree, an academic discipline to which an undergraduate student formally commits
