= Court councillor =

Title used in the Russian Empire

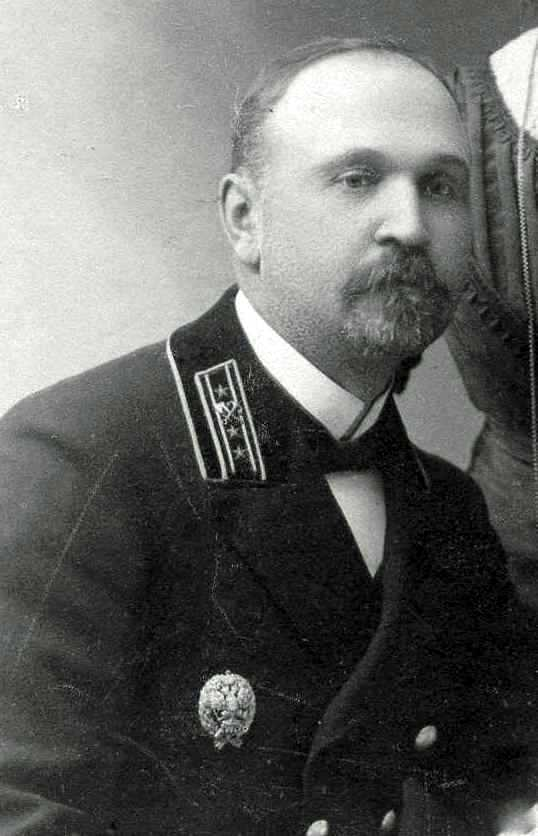
Court councillor. In the buttonhole fittings of the Ministry of Railways

The Russian court councillor (Russian: надворный советник) was a civilian rank of the 7th class in the Table of Ranks.

== Table of Ranks ==
The Table of Ranks was a system of ranks that tied a person's social standing to service in the military, in civil service, or at the imperial court. A court councilor's rank was moderately high on the list. Each category of service had 14 ranks.

The court councilor's rank corresponded to the rank of lieutenant colonel in the army, the sergeant in the Cossacks and captain of the 2nd rank. The official address for a court councilor was "Your Excellency". The signs of the distinction of this rank were double-luminous buttonholes or epaulets with three stars.

== History ==
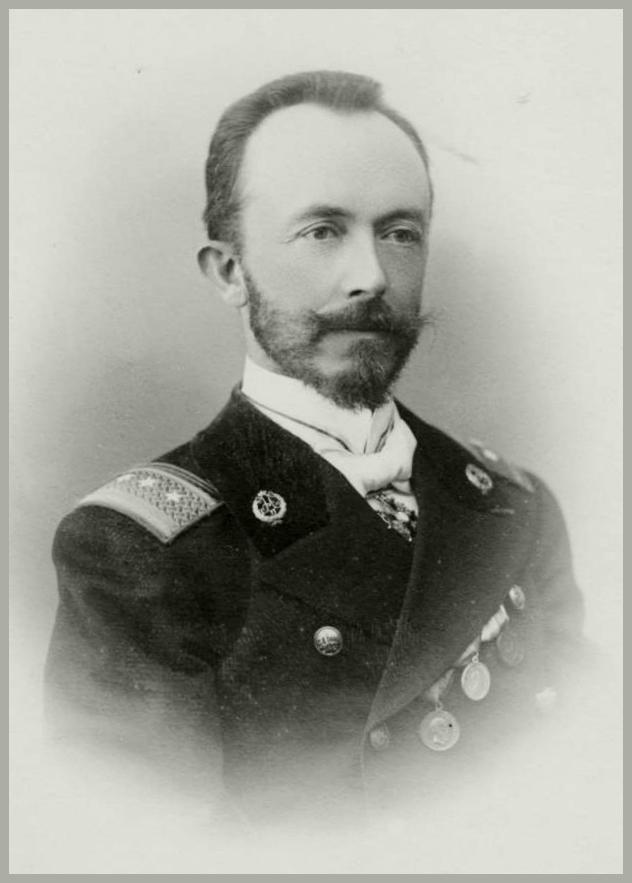
Court councillor (with epaulets as insignia).

Until 1745, this rank belonged to the 8th class and later belonged to the 7th class. Initially, persons who had reached this rank were automatically given hereditary nobility. After the reform of 1856, those who served received only personal nobility. After 1803, directors of departments of ministries and provincial authorities (governors, stewards, governors-general) could confer this rank.

Since the 19th century, all persons who had a doctor’s degree or academic title of professor received this rank automatically. This policy led most of the outstanding Russian scientists of that time to receive hereditary nobility.

The function of the court councilor was an adviser to the Hofgericht (Russian: хофгерихт, romanized: Hofgericht, through German: Hofgericht, from Latin: curia imperatoris – 'imperial court') – the suprime court of one (or sometimes several) territories (Governorates) of the Russian Empire. This rank remained in use even after these courts were abolished in 1726. The rank existed until November 25, 1917, when the entire system of rankings was abolished by the Decree Abolishing Classes and Civil Ranks.

== Literary characters serving as 7th-grade officials ==
- Ivan Kuzmich Podkolyosin in the play Marriage by Nikolai Gogol
- Postmaster Shchepkin and guardian of charitable institutions Zemlyanika in Gogol's comedy The Government Inspector
- Pyotr Petrovich Luzhin in Fyodor Dostoevsky’s novel Crime and Punishment
- Modest Alexeyich in Anton Chekhov's story "Anna on the Neck"
- Chekhov, Anton (February 1996). "On Frailty". Russian Life. Vol. 39, no. 2. Archived from the original on 2018-10-25 – via Questia.
- Erast Fandorin in Boris Akunin's novel The Jack of Spades
- Investigator of the Tsarist Police Nil Alekseevich Kolychev in the novel by Alexey Nagorny and Geliy Ryabov The Tale of the Criminal Investigation", later filmed as the TV series Born by the Revolution
- Andrey Stoltz in Ivan Goncharov's novel Oblomov
- Vasily Petrovich Bachey in the novel by Valentin Kataev The Small Farm in the Steppe. In the work A White Sail Gleams, the action of which takes place earlier, Vasily Bachey seems to be an official of a higher 6th class, Collegiate Councillor.
- Sozont Ivanovich Potugin in the novel by Ivan Turgenev's Smoke

== Sources ==
- Dmitry Liventsev. A brief dictionary of ranks and titles of state service of the Moscow State and the Russian Empire in the 15th and early 20th centuries.
- Leonid Shepelev. Titles, Uniforms, Orders in the Russian Empire
