= Kobylskaya-Vlasyeva's Mansion =

Mansion in Pushkin, St. Petersburg

- Особняк Кобыльской-Власьевой
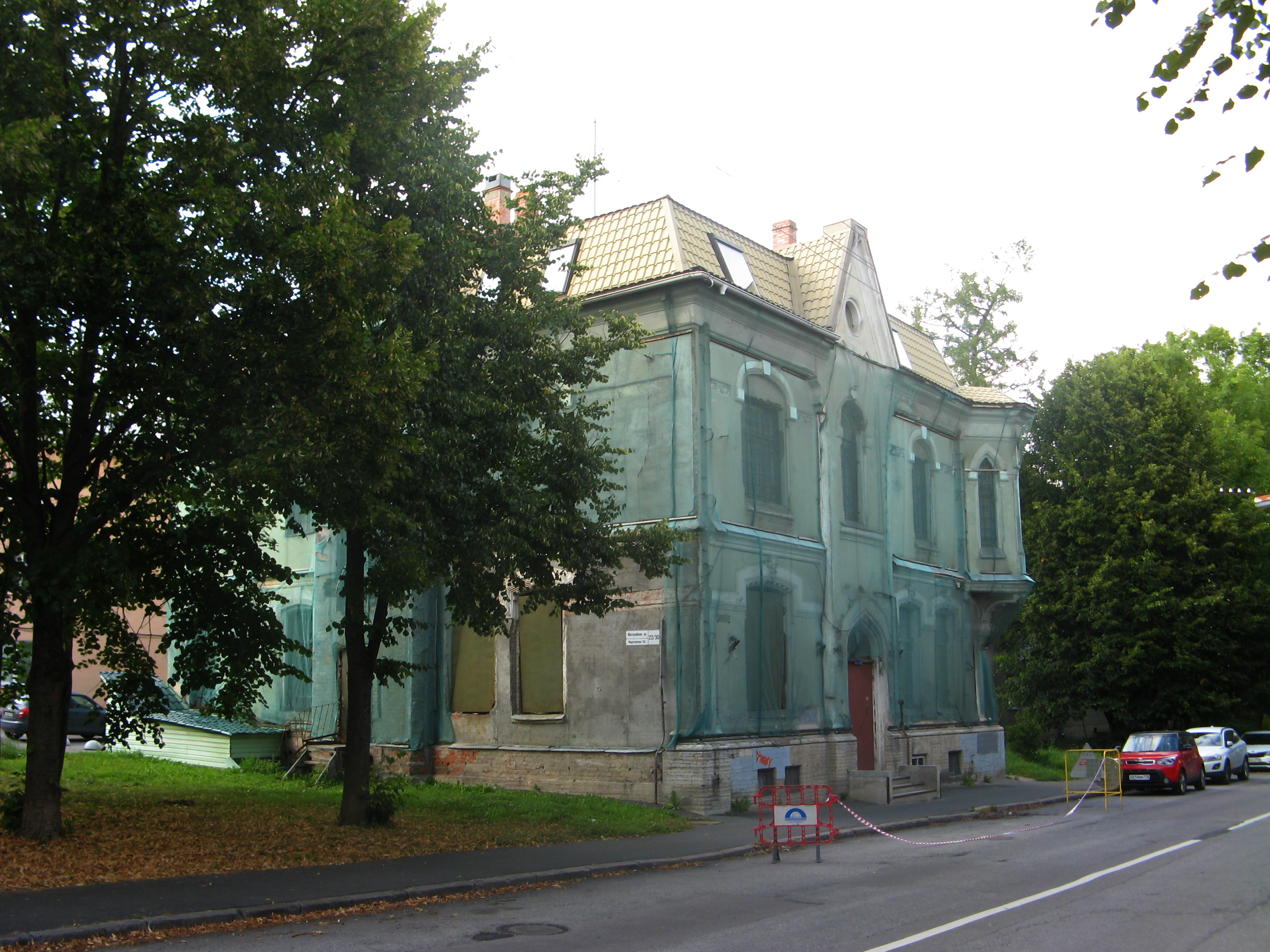
- Interactive map of the Kobylskaya-Vlasyeva's Mansion area

General information
- Location: Pushkin, 30/32 Cerkovnaya Street
- Coordinates: 59°43′29″N 30°24′14″E
- Completed: 1898

Kobylskaya-Vlasyeva's Mansion, built in 1898, is a designated cultural heritage site in Pushkin, in Saint Petersburg, Russia.

== History ==
In the mid-19th century, the plot of land where the building stands was owned by the wife of the sacristan of the Lutheran Church, Sh. F. Meyer and contained wooden structures. Later, it was owned by the daughter of State Councilor O. N. Kobylskaya, and then by her husband, Vlasyeva.

Kobylskaya had the current mansion built on the foundation of the former wooden house. The architect is unknown. After the October Revolution, the house was converted into apartments. In the 21st century, an attic was added.

== Architecture ==
The house is a two-story building with a square floor plan. It is made of brick with plaster finish. The style of the house reflects elements of the Northern Art Nouveau style.

The main façade (along Church Street) is asymmetrical where the right corner is decorated with a bay window. The shapes and sizes of the window openings vary. The doorway is decorated with an arched portal, above which the cornice ends with gables and an oval window. Ornamentation includes stucco moldings, pedimented window openings, and stucco gothic ornamentation. Above the entrance was an Art Nouveau metal canopy with forged details, which has not been preserved. The metal fence along Church Street was also made in the Art Nouveau style.

== Literature ==
- Семенова Г. В. (2009). Царское Село: знакомое и незнакомое. М.: Центрполиграф. pp. 399–401. ISBN 978-5-9524-4249-8.

== Sources ==
- "Церковная 30. Дом Власьевой (Кобыльской)". Энциклопедия Царского Села. Archived from the original on 2018-07-12.
- "Особняк О. Н. Кобыльской-Власьевой". citywalls.ru.
