= Active Privy Councillor =

Active Privy Councillor (Russian: действительный тайный советник, deystvitelnyi taynyi sovetnik) was the civil rank (ru: чин / chin) in the Russian Empire, according to the Table of Ranks introduced by Peter the Great in 1722. That was a civil rank of the 2nd class and equal to those of General-in-Chief in the Army and Admiral in the Navy. The rank holder should be addressed as Your High Excellency (Russian: Ваше Высокопревосходительство, Vashe Vysokoprevoskhoditelstvo). If the Foreign Minister had the rank of the 2nd class, he could be called Vice-Chancellor.

== Overview ==
Those who had the rank occupied the highest public offices available. The Senate employed the majority of them. Not every minister, especially early in his tenure, might have the rank. Most of Active privy councillors lived in St. Petersburg; they served in the main state institutions: the Council of State and the most important Ministries. In 1903, there were only 99 Active privy councillors in Russia. The rank was abolished in 1917 by the Decree on the Abolition of Estates and Civil Ranks.

== See also ==
- Geheimrat, a similar title in Germany
- Privy council
- Supreme Privy Council of Imperial Russia, founded on 19 February 1726
