= Prime major =

The prime major was the staff officer rank of the Russian Life Guards and the Imperial Russian Army of the 18th century.

The rank belonged to the 8th class of "Table of Ranks". According to the regulations of 1716 the majors were divided into prime majors and second majors. The prime major was an assistant to the colonel, and the second major was an assistant to his deputy lieutenant colonel.

The prime major was in charge of the regiment and the inspection units. He was the third official in the regiment. He exercised real command of the 1st battalion (divizion) of the regiment (the battalion chief was the colonel), and in the absence of the regiment commander and his deputy, he could command the entire regiment.

The division into prime and second majors was abolished in 1797. All prime and second majors became majors. In 1827, the majors received as an insignia two stars on the staff-officers' epaulettes.

== Sources ==
- Brockhaus and Efron Encyclopedic Dictionary. 1890–1907.
