= Privy Councillor (Russia) =

Civil position in the Russian Empire

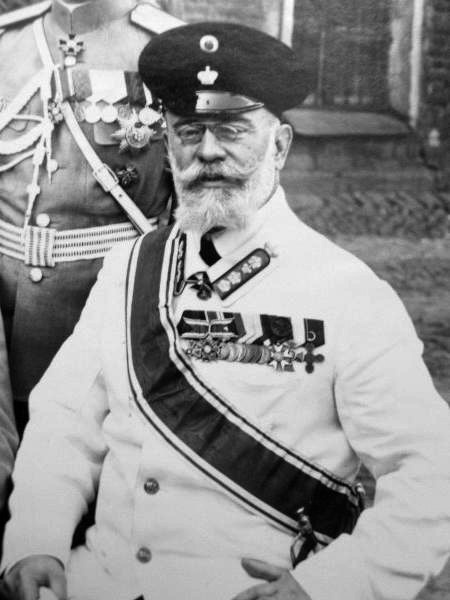
Privy Councillor in uniform. Insignia are laced buttonholes without gaps with three stars and emblem of his Ministry.

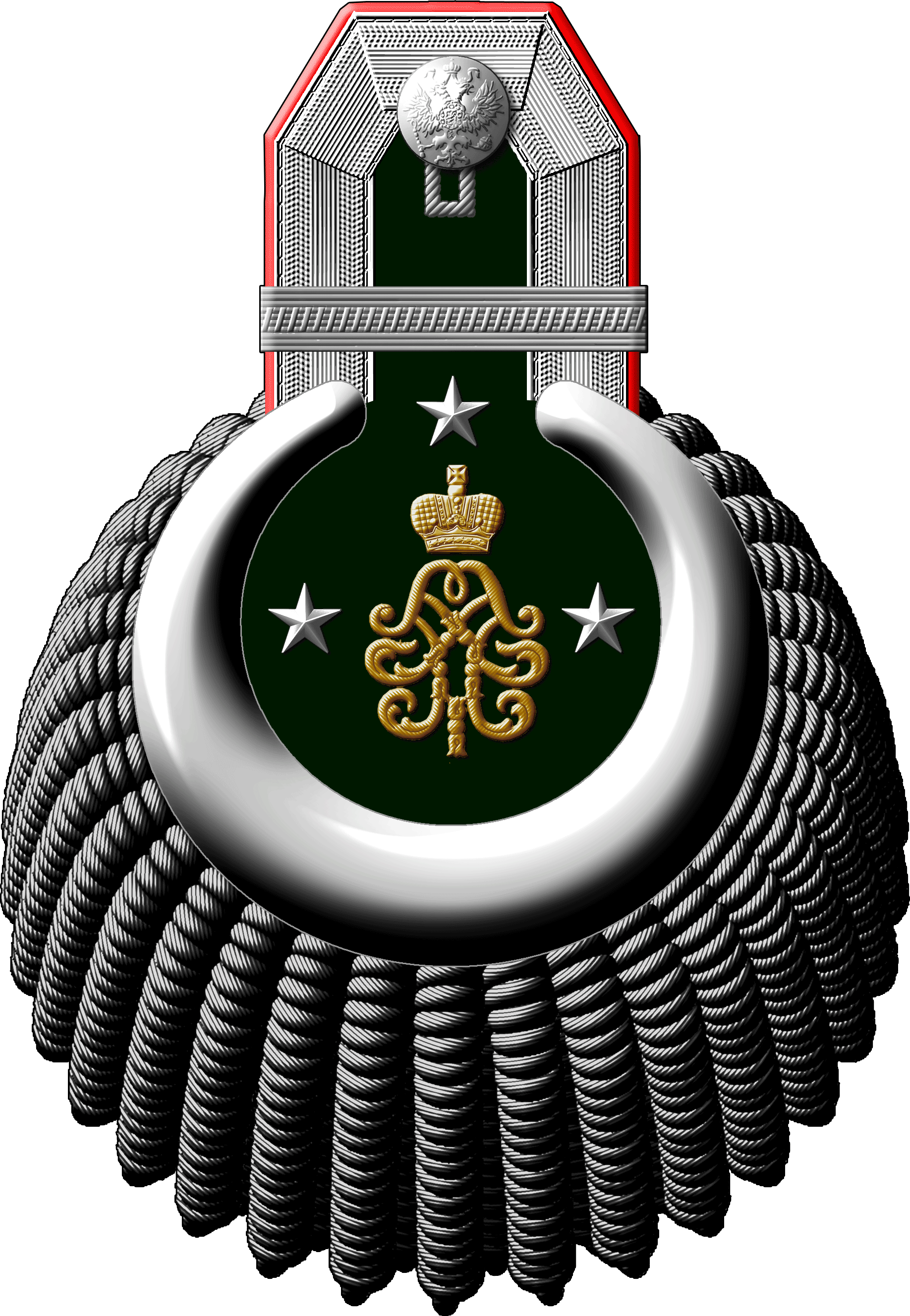
Epaulette of Privy councillor, Professor of the Imperial Military Medical Academy.

Privy Councillor (Russian: тайный советник, romanized: tayny sovetnik) was the civil position (class) in the Russian Empire, according to the Table of Ranks introduced by Peter the Great in 1722. Initially, it was a civil rank of the 4th class, but from 1724 it was upgraded to the 3rd class. The rank was equal to those of Lieutenant-General in the Army and Vice-Admiral in the Navy. The rank holder should be addressed as Your Excellency (Russian: Ваше Превосходительство, Vashe Prevoskhoditelstvo).

== Overview ==
The name of the rank can be associated with the original meaning of the words "secret" and "trustworthy". Those awarded this rank occupied the highest public offices, such as Minister or Deputy Minister, the head of a large department, senator, and academic of the Imperial Academy of Sciences. Occasionally, the rank was awarded to the long-time province governors to recognize their merits before their transfer to the capital. In addition to St. Petersburg, Privy Councillors could serve in Moscow and other large cities of the Russian Empire, for example in Tbilisi. The rector of Moscow State University, well-known historians Sergey Solovyov and Vasily Klyuchevsky, Professor of the Moscow Theological Academy Nicolay Subbotin were Privy Councillors. In 1903, there were 553 Privy Councillors in Russia.

Alongside the entire Table of Ranks, the rank was abolished by the Bolsheviks' decree in 1917.

== See also ==
- Geheimrat, a similar title in Germany
- Privy council
- Supreme Privy Council of Imperial Russia, founded on 19 February 1726
