= Oberjägermeister =

Court position in Russian Empire

Oberjägermeister (Russian: Обер-егермейстер, from German: Oberjägermeister) is a courtier Class II rank in the Table of Ranks of the Russian Empire. Ober-Jägermeister belonged to the highest ranks of the Imperial Court.

The Oberjägermeister was in charge of the Emperor's hunting expeditions. At his disposal were the head of the economic department, the royal trapper, the sovereign stirrup and the sovereign squire.

== See also ==
- Table of Ranks
