= Active State Councillor =

Civil position (class) in the Russian Empire

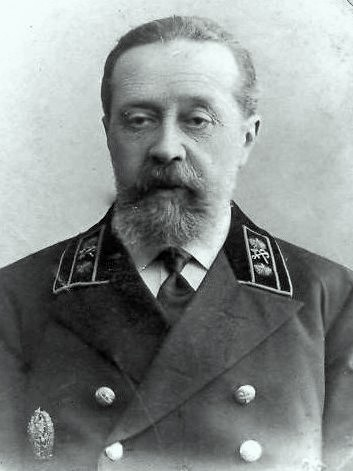
Unidentified Active State Councilor (1910–1914)

Active State Councillor (Russian: действительный статский советник, romanized: deystvitelnyi statskiy sovetnik) was a civil position (class) in the Russian Empire, according to the Table of Ranks introduced by Peter the Great in 1722. That was a civil rank of the 4th class and equal to those of Major-General in the Army, Rear Admiral in the Navy, and the court rank of Chamberlain (up to 1809). The rank gave the right of hereditary nobility. The rank holder should be addressed as Your Excellency (Russian: Ваше Превосходительство, Vashe Prevoskhoditelstvo).

== Overview ==
Those who had the rank served as directors of department, governors, mayors. From the middle of the 19th century, the rank of Active state councilor was included in the top of the four groups of civil officials. The group (from 1st to 5th grade) represented the high state bureaucracy, which determined the policy of the Russian Empire. The rankholders of this group had the highest salaries. In 1903, there were 3113 Active state councillors in Russia.

Initially, to qualify for the rank of Active state councilor, a candidate had to spend at least 10 years in the lower rank. Eventually, the requirement was canceled, and the rank was awarded solely by the Emperor's permission.

The rank was abolished in 1917 by the Decree on the Abolition of Estates and Civil Ranks.

== See also ==
- Supreme Privy Council of Imperial Russia, founded on 19 February 1726
- Erast Fandorin
- State civilian and municipal service ranks of the Russian Federation
- 1st class Active State Councillor of the Russian Federation
