= Second major (rank) =

Military rank of the Russian Empire

The second major was the junior staff officer rank in the Imperial Russian Army of the Russian Armed Forces of the imperial period of time, in the 18th century, and also the person wearing this rank.

The rank existed from 1716 (in another source from 1711) and belonged to the 8th class, in the period 1731–1798, "Table of Ranks" (in the Life Guards to the 6th class, in the period 1748–1798), and followed the rank of captain (company commander). Since the end of the 18th century, this rank has not granted.

== History ==
In the Russian army, the military rank "major" was introduced by Tsar Peter the Great, in 1698. In connection with the ongoing military reform of the Armed Forces of Russia, military construction and the improvement of formations, it was evidently necessary to increase the number of initial people in the main unit of the Russian Armed Forces of that time – the regiment, and therefore it was decided to introduce new ranks.

According to the charter of the Russian Imperial Army, 1716, the responsibilities of the major were divided between two new ranks in the regiment, so the prime major and second major appeared, that is, the first and second senior in the regiment. The prime major was an assistant to the regiment commander, colonel, and the second major was an assistant to the deputy commander of the regiment, lieutenant colonel (another source indicates that he was the closest assistant to the prime major and commanded the 2nd battalion), but the Small Brockhaus and Efron Encyclopedic Dictionary states that second major existed before the establishment of the rank of lieutenant colonel, in return for the rank of prime major.

The second major was in charge of the drill and guard service in the regiment, and was the fourth officer in the regiment. He also carried out the actual command of the 2nd battalion of the regiment (where the chief was the lieutenant colonel), that is, he was the battalion commander.

The division into prime and second majors was abolished in 1797, under Emperor Paul I. All prime and second majors became known as majors. In 1827, the majors received two stars on staff officer epaulettes as insignia.

== Personalities ==
- Velovsky, second major, commandant of the Rassypnaya fortress, which was located on the Orenburg line, in 1773, for their resistance to the Pugachev's rebels was chopped up by them, another source indicates that he was hanged;
- Alexander Skripitsyn, second major, known in the history of the Pugachev's Rebellion for protecting the suburbs of Osa, in 1774, surrendering the city, remained with the impostor in a gang, but soon repented of his betrayal, was betrayed and hanged by rebels;
- Peter Chelishchev was a writer, retired with the rank of second major;
- von Raan, second major of the general staff, is known for his essay "A List of Own Magazine During the Conquest of Moldova and Bessarabia from 1787 to 1790, With the Inclusion of One Drawing".

== See also ==
- Second lieutenant

== Sources ==
- Second major // Brockhaus and Efron Encyclopedic Dictionary: In 86 Volumes (82 Volumes and 4 Additional Volumes). Saint Petersburg. 1890–1907
- Dmitry Ushakov. Explanatory Dictionary of Ushakov – Moscow: 1935–1940
- Great Soviet Encyclopedia – Moscow: Soviet Encyclopedia. 1969–1978
- Leonid Shepelev. "Military Ranks" // Leonid Shepelev. "Titles, Uniforms, Orders in the Russian Empire" – Moscow: Nauka, 1991 – Page 88.
- Sergey Volkov. Russian Officer Corps. Moscow: Military Publishing House, 1993. Pages 38 – 49
- Bronislava Buchchina, Larisa Kakalutskaya. Together or Separately? Spelling Dictionary Reference – Moscow: Russian Language. 1998
- Leonid Belovinsky. Illustrated Encyclopedic Historical and Everyday Dictionary of the Russian People. 18th – the beginning of the 20th century. Moscow, 2007, page 609
