= Table of Ranks =

List of grades of civil and military service in Russian Empire

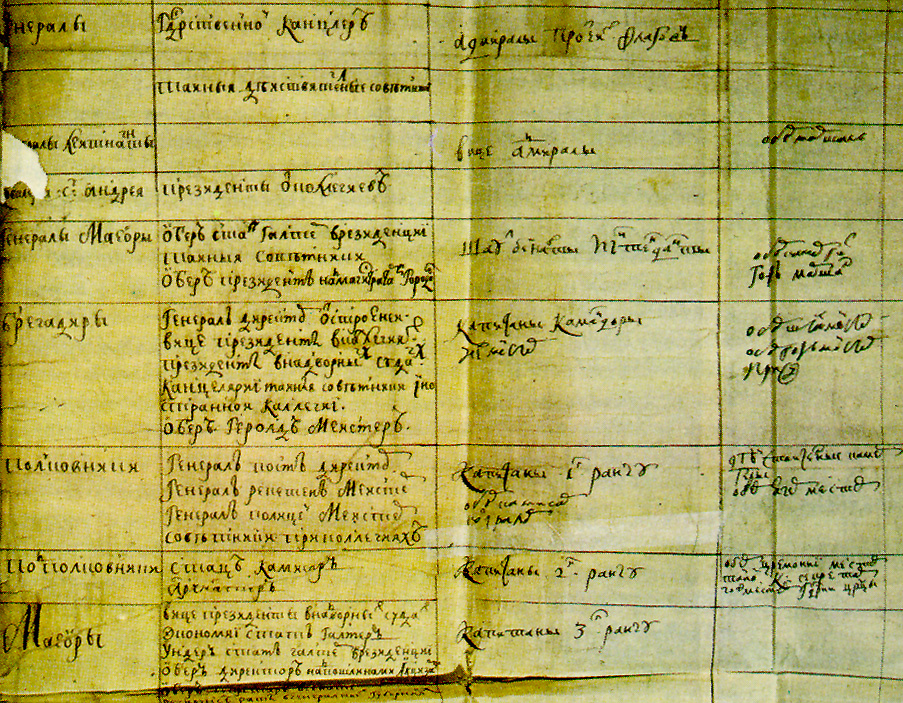
A manuscript copy of the 1722 Table of Ranks

The Table of Ranks (Russian: Табель о рангах, romanized: Tabel' o rangakh) was a formal list of positions and ranks in the military, government, and court of Imperial Russia. Peter the Great introduced the system in 1722 while engaged in a struggle with the existing hereditary nobility, or boyars. The Table of Ranks was formally abolished on 11 November 1917 by the newly established Bolshevik government.

== Principles ==
The Table of Ranks re-organized the foundations of feudal Russian nobility (mestnichestvo) by recognizing service in the military, in the civil service, and at the imperial court as the basis of an aristocrat's standing in society. The table divided ranks in 14 grades, with all nobles regardless of birth or wealth (at least in theory) beginning at the bottom of the table and rising through their service (sluzhba) to the tsar. While all grades were open by merit, promotion required qualification for the next rank, and grades 1 through 5 required the personal approval of the tsar himself. Despite initial resistance from noblemen, many of whom were still illiterate in the 18th century and who shunned the paper-pushing life of the civil servant, the eventual effect of the Table of Ranks was to create an educated class of noble bureaucrats.

Peter's intentions for a class of nobles bound to the tsar by their personal service to him were watered down by subsequent tsars. In 1762 Peter III abolished the compulsory 25-year military or civilian service for nobles. In 1767 Catherine the Great bought the support of the bureaucracy by making promotion up the 14 ranks automatic after seven years regardless of position or merit. Thus the bureaucracy became populated with time servers.

Achieving a certain level in the table automatically granted a certain level of nobility. A civil servant promoted to the 14th grade gained personal nobility (dvoryanstvo), and holding an office in the 8th grade endowed the office holder with hereditary nobility. Nicholas I raised this threshold to the 5th grade in 1845. In 1856 the grades required for hereditary nobility were changed to the 4th grade for the civil service and to the 6th grade for military service. The father of Vladimir Lenin progressed in the management of education, reaching the 4th rank and becoming an "active state councillor" (действительный статский советник), which gave him the privilege of hereditary nobility.

In practice, non-noble civil servants were frequently passed over from promotion to the eighth grade, creating a class of "eternal titular councillors" (Russian: вечный титулярный советник, romanized: vechny titulyarny sovetnik) who remained in this position for life. They were the subject of derision due to a supposed dullness and lack of creativity, and were satirized by authors such as Nikolai Gogol and Fyodor Dostoevsky.

With occasional revisions, the Table of Ranks remained in effect until the Russian Revolution of 1917.

== Table of Ranks ==
An abridged version of the Table of Ranks with time expiration set for promotion is shown below:

Class (K)	Civil (governmental) ranks	Military ranks		Court ranks	Period of time set for promotion (Note: In case of "His/Her Majesty's highest of all protégé", the period of time, set for promotion to the next higher rank, might be shortened by one year.)	Style of reference	Clergy ranks	
Class (K)	Civil (governmental) ranks	... in the Army	... in the Navy	Court ranks	Period of time set for promotion	Style of reference	Clergy ranks	
K-1	Chancellor (Kantsler); Active Privy Councillor, 1st class (Deystvitelny tayny sovetnik 1-go klassa)	General field marshal	General admiral	none		Ваше высокопревосходительство (Vashe vysokoprevoskhoditel’stvo)	Metropolit	Black clergy
K-2	Active Privy Councillor (Note: The Russian word "действительный" means "actual, valid, real, effective, true" and in this context is sometimes translated as "actual" or "acting" (which has the disadvantage of confusion with the English language concept of acting rank).) (Deystvitelny tayny sovetnik); Vice chancellor (Vitse-kantsler)	General of the infantry (–1763, 1796–); General of the cavalry (–1763, 1796–); General-Feldzeugmeister (-1763); General-in-chief (1763–1796); General of the artillery (1796–); Engineer-General (1796–)	Admiral	Ober-Chamberlain; Ober-Hofmarschall; Ober-Stallmeister (1766–); Oberjägermeister; Ober-Hofmeister (1760–); Ober-Cup-bearer (1762–)	not specified	Ваше высокопревосходительство (Vashe vysokoprevoskhoditel’stvo)	Archbishop	Black clergy
K-3	Privy Councillor (Tayny sovetnik)	Lieutenant general	Vice admiral	Ober-Stallmeister (–1766); Hofmarschall (1742–); Hofmeister; Stallmeister; Master of the Hunt; Ober-Master of ceremonies (1796–); Ober-Carver (1856–)	not specified	Ваше превосходительство (Vashe prevoskhoditel’stvo)	Bishop	Black clergy
K-4	Active State Councillor (Deystvitelny statsky sovetnik)	Major general	Rear admiral	Ober-Hofmeister (–1760); Chamberlain (1737–1809)	not specified	Ваше превосходительство (Vashe prevoskhoditel’stvo)	Archimandrite	Black clergy
K-5	State Councillor (Statsky sovetnik)	Brigadier (1722–1796)	Captain-commodore	Ober-Cup-bearer (–1762); Chamber-Junker (1742–1809); Master of ceremonies (1796–)	not specified	Ваше высокородие (Vashe vysokorodie)	Hegumen	Black clergy
K-5	State Councillor (Statsky sovetnik)	Brigadier (1722–1796)	Captain-commodore	Ober-Cup-bearer (–1762); Chamber-Junker (1742–1809); Master of ceremonies (1796–)	not specified	Ваше высокородие (Vashe vysokorodie)	Protopresbyter	White clergy
K-6	Collegiate Councillor (Kollezhsky sovetnik)	Polkovnik (infantry, artillery, cavalry, cossacks); Ober-krigskomissar (–1868)	Kapitan 1st rank	Hofmarschall (–1742); Chamber-Furir (1742–1884); Chamber-Junker (1737–1742); Chamberlain (–1737)	4 years to K-5	Ваше высокоблагородие (Vashe vysokoblagorodie)	Presbyter Protoiereus	White clergy
K-7	Court councillor (1745–) (Nadvorny sovetnik)	Podpolkovnik (infantry); Voyskovoy starshina (Cossacks 1884–); Krigskomissar (–1868)	Kapitan 2nd rank	none	4 years to K-6	Ваше высокоблагородие (Vashe vysokoblagorodie)	Iereus	White clergy
K-8	Collegiate assessor (Kollezhsky assessor)	Premjor-mayor / Secund-mayor (1731–1798); Mayor (infantry 1798–1884); Kapitan (infantry 1884–); Rotmistr (cavalry 1884–); Voyskovoy starshina (Cossacks 1796–1884); Esaul (Cossacks 1884–)	Kapitan 3rd rank (1722–1764); Kapitan-leytenant (1907–1911); Starshy leytenant (1912–)	Titular Chamberlain (–1771)	4 years to K-7	Ваше высокоблагородие (Vashe vysokoblagorodie)	Protodeacon	White clergy
K-9	Titular councillor (Tituljarny sovetnik)	Kapitan (infantry 1722–1884); Shtabs-kapitan (infantry 1884–); Rotmistr (cavalry 1798–1884); Shtabs-rotmistr (1884–); Esaul (Cossacks 1798–1884); Podesaul (Cossacks 1884–)	Galley master (–1826); Kapitan-poruchik (1764–1796); Kapitan-leytenant (1798–1884); Leytenant (1884–1906, 1912–); Starshy leytenant (1907–1911)	Chamber-Junker (–1737); Hof-Furir	3 years to K-8	Ваше высокоблагородие (Vashe vysokoblagorodie)	Deacon	White clergy
K-10	Collegiate secretary (Kollezhsky sekretar)	Kapitan-poruchik (infantry 1730–1797); Shtabs-kapitan (infantry 1779–1884); Sekund-rotmistr (cavalry –1797); Shtabs-rotmistr (cavalry 1779–1884); Tseychvart (artillery –1884); Poruchik (infantry, artillery, cavalry 1884–); Podesaul (Cossacks –1884); Sotnik (Cossacks 1884–)	Leytenant (1722–1884); Michman (1884-)	none	3 years to K-9	Ваше благородие (Vashe blagorodie)		
K-11	Naval secretary (Korabelny sekretar) (Note: Naval secretary was a naval rank until 1764, and reappeared as a civil rank no earlier than 1790.)	none	Naval secretary (Korabelny sekretar –1764)	none		Ваше благородие (Vashe blagorodie)		
K-12	Governorate Secretary (Gubernsky sekretar)	Podporuchik (infantry, artillery, 1884–); Sekund-poruchik (artillery 1722–1796); Kornet (cavalry, 1884–); Khorunzhii (Cossacks 1884–)	Unter-leytenant (1722–1732); Michman (1796–1884)	none	3 years to K-10	Ваше благородие (Vashe blagorodie)		
K-13	Provincial registrar (Kabinetsky registrator)	Podporuchik (infantry 1730–1884); Praporshchik zapasa (1884–, wartime only); Sekund-poruchik (artillery 1722–1796)	none			Ваше благородие (Vashe blagorodie)		
K-14	Collegiate registrar (Kollezhsky registrator); Collegiate Junker (Kollezhsky yunker, Kollei-yunker 1720–1822)	Fendrik (infantry 1722–1730); Praporshchik (infantry 1730–1884); Cornet (cavalry 1731–1884); Shtyk-yunker (artillery 1722–1796); Khorunzhy (Cossacks -1884)	Michman (1732–1796)	none	3 years to K-12	Ваше благородие (Vashe blagorodie)		

The table below contains the military ranks of the Guards (infantry and cavalry) 1722 until 1917.

Class	Infantry				Cavalry			
Class	1722	1730	1748	1884–1917	1730	1748	1798	1884–1917
1	– not scheduled –							
2	– not scheduled –							
3			Colonel (Polkovnik)			Colonel		
4	Colonel		Lieutenant colonel (Podpolkovnik)			Lieutenant colonel		
5	Lieutenant colonel		Prime major (Premer-mayor)			Prime major		
6	Major		Second major (Skund-mayor)	Colonel		Second major	Colonel	
7	Captain (Kapitan)	Captain	Captain	Captain	Rittmeister (Rotmistr)	Rittmeister	Rittmeister	Rittmeister
8	Captain lieutenant (Kapitan-leytenant)	Captain poruchik (Kapitan-poruchik)		Stabskapitän (Stabs-kapitan)	Sekundrittmeister (Sekund-rotmistr)		Stabsrittmeister (Stabs-rotmistr)	
9	Lieutenant (Leytenant)	Poruchik			Poruchik			
10	Unterleutnant (Unter-leytenant)	Podporuchik			Podporuchik			Cornet (Kornet)
11	– not scheduled –							
12	Fähnrich (Fendrik)	Praporshchik					Cornet	
13	– not scheduled –							
14	– not scheduled –							

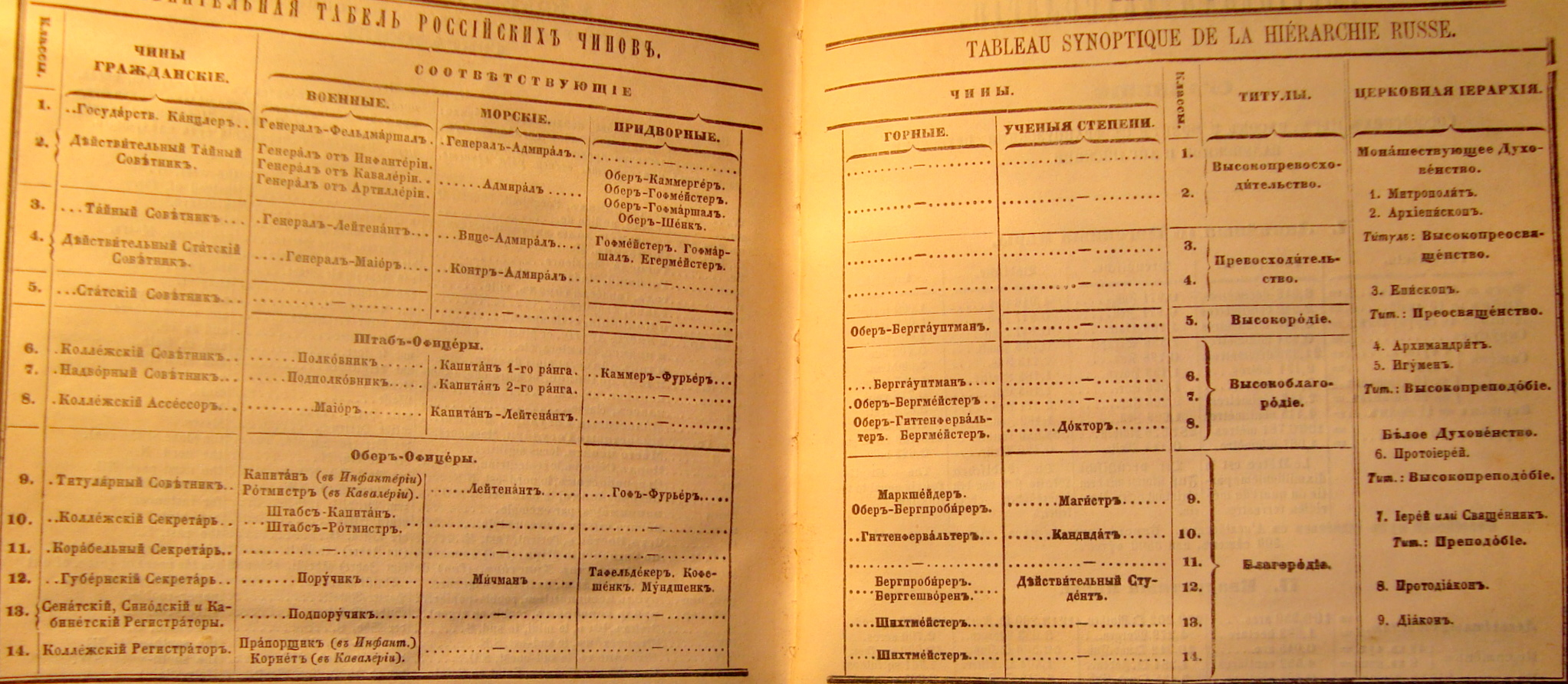
An 1898 copy of the Table of Ranks

Peter I stipulated that "princes related to us or married to our princesses always take precedence" and that when military officers of the army and navy were of the same rank, "the naval officer is superior at sea to the land officer; and on land the land officer is superior to the naval officer". He laid down that fines of two months' salary should be assessed against those falsely claiming a higher rank or gaining a rank without qualification. He stated that service with a foreign monarch would not automatically confer the rank until approved by the tsar, as "we do not grant any rank to anyone until he performs a useful service to us or to the state", while women were to "advance in rank with their husbands".

== Style of address ==
In a way the government, court, military and clergy ranks represented the gentry class of the Russian Empire. Similarly to the noble titles, the rank holders each had their specific style of address:

As of 1917 (the year of the monarchy's collapse)
Class	Civil, court and military ranks		Clergy ranks			Class
Class	in Russian	English translation	in Russian	English translation		Class
K-1	Ваше высокопревосходительство	Your High Excellency	Ваше высокопреосвященство, владыко	Your High Eminence, Lordship	Black clergy	K-1
K-2	Ваше высокопревосходительство	Your High Excellency	Ваше высокопреосвященство, владыко	Your High Eminence, Lordship	Black clergy	K-2
K-3	Ваше превосходительство	Your Excellency	Ваше преосвященство, владыко	Your Eminence, Lordship	Black clergy	K-3
K-4	Ваше превосходительство	Your Excellency	Ваше высокопреподобие	Your High Reverence	Black clergy	K-4
K-5	Ваше высокородие	Your High Born	Ваше высокопреподобие	Your High Reverence	Black clergy	K-5
K-5	Ваше высокородие	Your High Born	Ваше высокоблагословение	Your High Blessedness	White clergy	K-5
K-6	Ваше высокоблагородие	Your High Well Born	Ваше высокоблагословение	Your High Blessedness	White clergy	K-6
K-7	Ваше высокоблагородие	Your High Well Born	Ваше благословение	Your Blessedness	White clergy	K-7
K-8	Ваше высокоблагородие	Your High Well Born	Ваше высокоблаговестие	Your High Evangelism	White clergy	K-8
K-9	Ваше благородие	Your Well Born (Also applied to the lowest ranks of the nobility: Barons, the generic titles of Dvoryanin, Pomeshchik and landless nobles)	Ваше благовестие	Your Evangelism	White clergy	K-9
K-10	Ваше благородие	Your Well Born (Also applied to the lowest ranks of the nobility: Barons, the generic titles of Dvoryanin, Pomeshchik and landless nobles)				K-10
K-11	Ваше благородие	Your Well Born (Also applied to the lowest ranks of the nobility: Barons, the generic titles of Dvoryanin, Pomeshchik and landless nobles)				K-11
K-12	Ваше благородие	Your Well Born (Also applied to the lowest ranks of the nobility: Barons, the generic titles of Dvoryanin, Pomeshchik and landless nobles)				K-12
K-13	Ваше благородие	Your Well Born (Also applied to the lowest ranks of the nobility: Barons, the generic titles of Dvoryanin, Pomeshchik and landless nobles)				K-13
K-14	Ваше благородие	Your Well Born (Also applied to the lowest ranks of the nobility: Barons, the generic titles of Dvoryanin, Pomeshchik and landless nobles)				K-14

Outside that table are the rank of Generalissimus, which was an honorary title and not a military rank and the title of Patriarch, which theoretically equaled the eminence of the Russian Emperor, but which Peter the Great kept vacant between 1700 and 1720 and eventually substituted for the collective board of the Most Holy Synod, effectively turning the Church into a department of the state.

== First complete translation into English ==
The first complete translation into English of the original Table of Ranks promulgated by Peter the Great in 1722 was presented by Brazilian historian Angelo Segrillo in 2016.

== See also ==
- History of Russian military ranks
- List of Japanese court ranks, positions and hereditary titles
- Wohlgeboren
