= State Councillor (Russia) =

High-ranking civil servant in the pre-1917 Eurasian country

State Councillor (Russian: статский советник, statskiy sovetnik) was the civil position (class) in the Russian Empire, according to the Table of Ranks introduced by Peter the Great in 1722. That was a civil rank of the 5th class and equal to those of brigadier in the Army, captain-commander in the Navy, and marshal of the court or grand cupbearer in the court.

In 1796, the rank of brigadier was canceled in the Army, so the rank of state councillor was placed between ranks of major general and colonel. Until 1856, the rank gave the right of hereditary nobility; later, that threshold was raised to the 4th class. The rank holder should be addressed as Your High Born (Russian: Ваше Высокородие, Vashe Vysokorodie).

== Overview ==
State councillors usually served as vice-governors, vice-directors of large departments, or chairmen of the state chamber. In the middle of the 19th century, the rank was the lowest in the top group of state officials. This group (from 1st to 5th grade) represented the highest state establishment defining the government policy. Rankholders enjoyed special privileges and high salaries. Initially, to qualify for the rank of State councilor, a candidate had to spend five years in the lower rank.

The rank was abolished in 1917 by the Decree on the Abolition of Estates and Civil Ranks.

== See also ==
- Counselor of State (Finland)
- Conseiller d'État (France)
- State councillor (China)
