= Collegiate Councillor =

6th rank civil position in Russian Empire

Collegiate Councillor (Russian: колле́жский сове́тник, kollezhskii sovetnik) was a civil rank of 6th class in the Russian Empire, according to the Table of Ranks introduced by Peter the Great in 1722. It was equal to those of Colonel in the Army and Captain 1st rank in the Navy. The rank holder should be addressed as Your High Well Born (Russian: Ваше Высокоблагородие, Vashe Vysokoblagorodie).

== History of the rank ==
In 1717, Peter I started to reform the executive institutions. The Collegiums appeared, in which Collegiate Councillor was one of the posts. On 24 January 1722, the Table of Ranks was introduced as a law which regulated employment in the civil service. This law contained the list of new ranks split into 14 classes. The Collegiate Councillor rank was attributed to the 6th class.

According to the Table of Ranks, both civil and military ranks were assigned to a person for seniority and/or providing extraordinary services. The people who received a rank of the 6th class were classified as the highest nobility (hereditary), regardless of their origins.

Elizabeth Petrovna, the Empress of Russia, by her decree from 23 June 1745, made it obligatory that a person only be promoted to the 6th class from the 7th one (before it had been possible to "skip" the 7th class and to be promoted from the 8th one).

The rank was abolished in 1917 by the Decree on the Abolition of Estates and Civil Ranks.

== Possible career paths for Collegiate Councilors ==
As the bureaucracy in the Russian Empire was developing, a Collegiate councillor could serve as a chief of a department, a prosecutor, a chief secretary of the Senate. A marshal of nobility could become a collegiate councillor after three years of service. The changes in services of rank-holders from the 6th class were executed by the "highest orders".

According to the law "About the enrollment of the ranks in civil service", issued on 9 December 1856, it was acknowledged that the quality of service is dependent not only on education exclusively, but also on experience and competence. The time of service required of the officials of the 6th class before the next promotion was increased to five years (from four years) in 1898.

In 1857, the number of the officials in the 6th class was 2216 (compared to 541 in 1796).

== Requirements ==
The list of requirements for a person to be eligible for a service in the 6th class included:

- Russian citizenship
- Male
- No criminal records
- Completed service in the Army
- University level of education; and/or
- Nobility (personal or hereditary)
