= Decree on the Abolition of Estates and Civil Ranks =

The Decree on the Abolition of Estates and Civil Ranks was a decree approved by the Central Executive Committee of the All-Russian Congress of Soviets of Workers' and Soldiers' Deputies at its meeting on November 23, 1917 and agreed to by the Council of People's Commissars on November 24, 1917. Published on November 25, 1917 in the Newspaper of the Provisional Workers and Peasants Government and Izvestia, on December 21, 1917 published in the Assembly of the Laws and Regulations of the Workers and Peasants Government. The decree contained a provision (Article No. 7) on the entry into force "from the date of its publication".

The decree was intended to abolish the estates and estate legal instruments — classes, titles and civil ranks of the Russian Empire on the territory of Soviet Russia, to introduce the legal equality of all citizens of the new state.

== History ==
Before the October Revolution, in the Russian Empire there was an institute of allegiance, which enshrined the legal inequality of the subjects, in many ways it has developed in the feudal Middle Ages.

By 1917, the subjects of the Russian Empire were subdivided into several categories (classes) with a special legal status:

- natural subjects, which, in turn, stood out:
  1. nobles (hereditary and personal);
  2. clerics (shared by religion);
  3. urban inhabitants (divided into groups: honorary citizens, merchants, tradesmen and shopkeepers);
  4. rural inhabitants;
- Inorodtsy (Jews and Eastern peoples);
- Finnish inhabitants.

Imperial legislation related to the belonging to one or another category of subjects by very significant differences in rights and duties. For example, four groups of natural subjects were divided into persons of taxable and non-taxable status. Persons of non-taxable status (noblemen and honorary citizens) enjoyed freedom of movement and received indefinite passports to live throughout the Russian Empire; persons of the taxable state (burghers and peasants) did not have such rights. Belonging to the estate was inherited, the transition from one class to another was rather difficult.

The decree contained the following basic provisions:

1. All the estates and class divisions of citizens that existed before in Russia, the estate privileges and restrictions, the estate organizations and institutions, as well as all civil ranks are abolished.
2. Any titles (nobleman, merchant, tradesman, peasant, etc., princely, county titles, etc.) and the name of civilian officials (secret, state and other advisers) are destroyed and one common name for the entire Russian population is established — citizens of the Russian Republic.

According to article 3 of the decree, the property of the noble-class institutions, merchant and petty-bourgeois societies was transferred to the respective local and city governments.

== Characteristic and significance ==
Decree Abolishing Classes and Civil Ranks abolished estates and estate legal instruments — classes, titles and civilian ranks of the Russian Empire on the territory of Soviet Russia, and also introduced the concept of Russian citizenship. For example, on its basis, on April 5, 1918, the All-Russian Central Executive Committee adopted a Decree "On the Acquisition of the Rights of Russian Citizenship", which allowed an foreigner living within the Russian Soviet Federative Socialist Republic to become a Russian citizen.

The decree affected all subsequent legislation of the RSFSR and the USSR on citizenship.

== See also ==
- Nobility
- Table of Ranks
