= Style (form of address) =

Official or legally recognized title for a person or entity

A style of office, also called manner of reference, or form of address when someone is spoken to directly, is an official or legally recognized form of reference for a person or other entity (such as a government or company), and may often be used in conjunction with a personal title. A style, by tradition or law, precedes a reference to a person who holds a post or political office and is sometimes used to refer to the office itself. An honorific can also be awarded to an individual in a personal capacity. Such styles are particularly associated with monarchies, where they may be used by a wife of an office holder or of a prince of the blood, for the duration of their marriage. They are also almost universally used for presidents in republics and in many countries for members of legislative bodies, higher-ranking judges, and senior constitutional office holders. Religious leaders also have styles.

The second-person (singular and plural) possessive adjective your is used as a form of address (that is, when speaking directly to the person[s] entitled to the style[s]); the third-person possessive adjectives his/her (singular) and their (plural) are used as forms of reference (that is, when speaking about the person[s] entitled to the style[s]).

== Examples ==
=== Academia ===
Traditional forms of address at German-speaking universities:

- His/Her Magnificence – rector (president) of a university
- His/Her Notability (Seine Spektabilität; Professors have the privilege to use the Latin Spectabilis) – dean of a faculty

Traditional forms of address at Dutch-speaking universities:

- His/Her Great Honour (Edelgrootachtbare heer/vrouwe) – rector magnificus (president) of a university
- Highly Learned Sir/Madam (Hooggeleerde heer/vrouwe) – professor or dean of a faculty
- Well (Noble) Very Learned Sir/Madam (Weledelzeergeleerde heer/vrouwe) – a doctor
- Well (Noble) Learned Sir/Madam (De weledelgeleerde heer/vrouwe) – a doctorandus
- Well (Noble) Strictly Sir/Madam (De weledelgestrenge heer/vrouwe) – a master in laws (meester in de rechten) or a university engineer (ingenieur)

Traditional forms of address at Italian-speaking universities:

- Magnificent Rector (magnifico rettore) – rector (president, chancellor) of a university
- Amplified Headmaster (amplissimo preside) – dean of a faculty (now uncommon)
- Illustrious/Enlightened Professor (chiarissimo professore) – a full professor

=== Government ===
==== Diplomats ====
- His Most Reverend Excellency (abbreviation His Most Rev. Ex., oral address Your Excellency) – apostolic nuncios, because their rank is equal to that of an ambassador extraordinary and plenipotentiary, and they are simultaneously higher prelates.
- His/Her Excellency (abbreviation HE, oral address Your Excellency) – most ambassadors, high commissioners and permanent representatives to international organizations. Occasionally a different form of address is used domestically with the international equivalent of Excellency being used in all other cases.

==== Judiciaries ====
- His/Her Honour Judge X
  - Abbreviation HHJ X, oral address Your Honour – Circuit judges in England and Wales.
  - The Honourable Mr./Ms. Justice X (abbreviation X J, referential His Lordship/Her Ladyship; oral address My Lord/Lady or Your Lordship/Your Ladyship) – Judges of the High Court of Justice of England and Wales.
  - My Lord/Your Lordship is used to address judiciary representatives in India.
  - The Honorable (abbreviation The Hon., oral address Your Honor) – Judges and justices in the United States.
  - Oral address Your Honour – All courts in Australia.
  - The Right Honourable Lord/Lady Justice X (abbreviation X LJ) – Judges of the Court of Appeal of England and Wales.
- Oral address Your Excellency – Judges of the International Court of Justice.
- Oral address Your Worship – All courts in Australia (obsolete).
- The Lord/Lady/Baroness X (abbreviated to Lord/Lady/Baroness X, referred to as His Lordship/Her Ladyship, addressed orally as My Lord/My Lady) – Judges in the High Court of Justiciary and the Court of Session in Scotland, and the Supreme Court of the United Kingdom.
- Oral address Your Worship – Justices of the peace (magistrates) in the United Kingdom, usually by solicitors.

==== Monarchies ====
- Sire (oral address first Your Majesty and then Sire; for a queen first Your Majesty and then Ma'am) – Reigning kings in the United Kingdom and in Belgium. It has also been used in France, Italy, Germany, Portugal, Sweden and Spain.
- His/Her Imperial Majesty (abbreviation HIM, oral address Your Imperial Majesty) – Emperors and empresses. Formerly, for example, HIM the Shah of Iran. In modern times, the Emperor of Japan more often uses the simpler style of "Majesty".
- His/Her Imperial and Royal Majesty (abbreviation HI&RM, oral address Your Imperial and Royal Majesty) – until 1918, the rulers of the Austro-Hungarian Empire, who were Emperors/Empresses of Austria while also Kings/Queens of Hungary and Bohemia, and the German emperors/empresses, who were simultaneously Kings/Queens of Prussia.
- His/Her Apostolic Majesty (abbreviation HAM, oral address Your Apostolic Majesty) – the King of Hungary, usually styled Imperial Majesty or Imperial and Royal Majesty as Emperor of Austria and King of Hungary, also sometimes Imperial and Royal Apostolic Majesty.
- His/Her Britannic Majesty – the British monarch (not usual); used as a formal and official term in diplomacy, international law, and international relations, e.g. in British passports.
- His/Her Most Gracious Majesty – an elaborate version of His/Her Majesty in the United Kingdom, only used in the most formal of occasions.
- His/Her Most Excellent Majesty – another elaborate version of His/Her Majesty in the United Kingdom, mainly used in Acts of Parliament.
- His/Her Catholic Majesty (abbreviation HCM, oral address Your Catholic Majesty) – the Spanish monarch (not usual).
- His Most Christian Majesty – the King of France until 1790 and from 1815 to 1830.
- His/Her Most Faithful Majesty (abbreviation HFM, oral address Your Faithful Majesty) – the King of Portugal until deposed in 1910.
- His/Her Majesty (abbreviation HM, oral address Your Majesty) – kings, queens and some sultans. For example, HM King Charles III, HM King Mohammed VI or HM King Willem-Alexander.
- His/Her Imperial Highness (abbreviation HIH, oral address Your Imperial Highness) – members of an imperial house. Currently used by the Imperial House of Japan.
- His/Her Imperial and Royal Highness (abbreviation HI&RH, oral address Your Imperial and Royal Highness) – formerly, archdukes of the House of Habsburg, the German crown prince/princess and (post-monarchy) members of the deposed Brazilian Imperial Family; also some women entitled to imperial style by birth and to royal style by marriage (e.g., Grand Duchess Maria Alexandrovna of Russia, Duchess of Edinburgh).
- His/Her Royal Highness (abbreviation HRH, oral address Your Royal Highness) – some monarchs, members of a royal family (other than monarchs, queens consort and queens dowager); grand dukes/duchesses who have reigned (but not those grand dukes who were cadets of the former Russian Imperial Family), consorts of grand dukes, grand ducal heirs apparent and, in Luxembourg, all dynastic male-line cadets; British princes, their dynastic wives (including the prince consort of queens Victoria and Elizabeth II), sons, daughters, patrilineal grandsons and granddaughters of Ibn Saud of the House of Saud.
- His/Her Grace (oral address Your Grace) is a style used for various high-ranking personages. It was the style used to address Kings of England until King Henry VIII and the King or Queen of Scots up to the Act of Union of 1707, which united the Kingdom of Scotland and the Kingdom of England. Today, the style is used when referring to non-royal dukes and duchesses, and archbishops, in the United Kingdom. For example, His Grace The Duke of Devonshire in the United Kingdom, or His Grace The Archbishop of Canterbury; or Your Grace in spoken or written address. Royal dukes, for example the Duke of Edinburgh, are addressed with their higher royal style, Royal Highness.
- His/Her Grand Ducal Highness (abbreviation HGDH, oral address Your Grand Ducal Highness) – cadets of some former ruling grand ducal dynasties (Hesse and by Rhine and Baden).
- His/Her Highness (abbreviation HH, oral address, Your Highness) – some monarchs, i.e., emirs, some sultans, the Aga Khan; formerly reigning dukes, some maharajas and rajas and the members of their dynasties; cadets of most former grand ducal houses; male-line grandchildren and remoter male-line descendants of some kingly dynasties (i.e., Denmark and formerly Brazil, Italy, Japan, UK, Yugoslavia); Belgium's House of Ligne; members of France's former Foreign Princely class, members of cadet branches of the House of Saud.
- His/Her Ducal Serene Highness (abbreviation HDSH, oral address, Your Ducal Serene Highness) – members of the formerly reigning ducal House of Saxe-Coburg and Gotha.
- His/Her Serene Highness (abbreviation HSH, oral address Your Serene Highness) – German: Seine/Ihre Durchlaucht; Italian: Sua Altezza Serenissima; Russian: Ваша светлость. Sovereigns of a principality (i.e., Liechtenstein, Monaco); members of formerly reigning princely families (Lippe, Schaumburg-Lippe, Waldeck and Pyrmont and Schwarzburg); members of mediatized families headed by a Fürst ("prince"); members of several formerly noble, princely families of Austria, Germany, Bohemia, Hungary and Poland; morganatic princes, descended from reigning dynasties; and a few formerly noble families granted the princely title in Imperial Russia (the style is more literally translated "His/Her Serenity").
- Her/His Most Serene Highness (abbreviation HMSH, oral address, Your Most Serene Highness) – Prince-electors of the Holy Roman Empire.
- His/Her Illustrious Highness (abbreviation HIllH, oral address Your Illustrious Highness, German: Seine/Ihre Erlaucht); Italian: Sua Altezza Illustrissima; Spanish: Su Ilustrísima; Russian: Ваше сиятельство. Mediatized counts and, sometimes, members of their families.
- His/Her Princely Grace (Fürstliche Gnaden) – former style for members of a few noble families of monarchical Germany.
- The High-born (Hochgeboren) – counts in some Scandinavian and Benelux monarchies and, formerly, Germany and Austria.
- The High Well-born (Hochwohlgeboren) – Dutch barons; knights and untitled members of the lower nobility in German-speaking monarchies.
- His/Her Excellency (abbreviation HE, oral address Your Excellency) – governors-general, British colonial governors, state officials, and generals of Imperial Russia. Occasionally, prime ministers and cabinet ministers. For example, the Prime Minister of the Netherlands; in Denmark, a few high-ranked nobles (e.g., Counts af Danneskiold-Samsø, Counts of Rosenborg, Lensgrever, knights of the Order of the Elephant).
- Don (Spanish: [don], Italian: [dɔn], Portuguese: Dom [dõ]) from Latin: dominus, lit. 'Lord', is an honorific title used in Spain, Portugal, Italy, Iberoamerica and the Philippines. The female equivalent is doña (Spanish: [ˈdoɲa]), donna (Italian: [ˈdɔnna]), and dona (Portuguese: [ˈdonɐ]), abbreviated "Dª" or simply "D." In formal settings, it is a title reserved for royalty, select nobles, knights, dames, and church hierarchs. Informally, it is sometimes used as a mark of esteem for a person of personal, social or official distinction, such as a community leader of long standing, or a person of significant wealth. Like the British Sir, it is used with, and not instead of, a person's name.
- In Portugal and Brazil, Dom (pronounced [ˈdõ]) is used for certain hierarchs of the Catholic Church and for laymen who belong to the royal and imperial families (for example, the House of Aviz in Portugal and the House of Braganza in Portugal and Brazil). It was also accorded to members of families of the titled Portuguese nobility. Unless ennobling letters patent specifically authorised its use, Dom was not attributed to members of Portugal's untitled nobility. Since hereditary titles in Portugal descended according to primogeniture, the right to the style of Dom was the only apparent distinction between cadets of titled families and members of untitled noble families.
- Most High, Mighty, and Illustrious Prince – for royal dukes, oral address Your Royal Highness.
- Son of Heaven – used by Chinese and some Japanese emperors.
- High King
- Great King
- King of Kings – used by especially Semitic, Persian and some Indian rulers.
- "Taewang" "Greatest of Kings" – used by the later rulers of the Korean kingdom of Koguryo.
- Lord of the Isles – used by an heir apparent of the British monarchy.
- High Steward of Scotland – used by an heir apparent of the British monarchy.
- Custodian of the Two Holy Mosques (abbreviation CTHM) (Arabic: خادم الحرمين الشريفين Khādim al-Ḥaramayn aš-Šarīfayn), sometimes translated as Servant of the Two Noble Sanctuaries or Protector of the Two Holy Cities, is a royal style that has been used by many Islamic rulers including the Ayyubids, the Mamluk Sultans of Egypt, the Ottoman Sultans, and the modern Saudi kings. The title refers to the ruler taking the responsibility of guarding and maintaining the two holiest mosques in Islam, Al-Masjid al-Haram (the Sacred Mosque) in Mecca and Al-Masjid an-Nabawi (the Prophet's Mosque) in Medina. In Saudi Arabia, it is used as the official title of the king, in place of "His Majesty".
- Amīr al-Mu'minīn (Arabic: أمير المؤمنين), usually translated Commander of the Faithful or Leader of the Faithful, is the Arabic style of some Caliphs and other independent sovereign Muslim rulers that claim legitimacy from a community of Muslims. It has been claimed as the title of rulers in Muslim countries and empires and is still used for some Muslim leaders. The use of the title does not necessarily signify a claim to caliphate as it is usually taken to be, but described a certain form of activist leadership which may have been attached to a caliph but also could signify a level of authority beneath that. The Ottoman sultans, in particular, made scant use of it. Moreover, the term was used by men who made no claim to be caliphs. Used by the former leader of ISIS Abu Bakr al-Baghdadi, the Ahmadiyya Muslim leader Mirza Masroor Ahmad, the King of Morocco, the Sultan of Sokoto, and the supreme leaders of the Afghan Taliban.
- Kabiyesi (variously translated as His or Her Royal Majesty, His or Her Royal Highness or His or Her Highness, lit. The One whose words are beyond question) – used by the Obas of Yorubaland, other aboriginal Yoruba high chiefs of royal background, and their counterparts in the tribe's diaspora communities.

===== Styles and titles of deposed monarchs =====
General tradition indicates that monarchs who have ceased to reign but not renounced their hereditary titles, retain the use of their style and title for the duration of their lifetimes, but both die with them. Hence, prior to his death, Greece's deposed king was still styled His Majesty King Constantine II, as a personal title, not as occupant of a constitutional office, since the abolition of the monarchy by the Hellenic Republic in 1974. Similarly, until his death, the last King of Italy, Umberto II, was widely referred to as King Umberto II and sometimes addressed as Your Majesty. In contrast, Simeon of Bulgaria who, subsequent to the loss of his throne in 1947, was elected to and held the premiership of his former realm as "Simeon Sakskoburggotski", and therefore is as often referred to by the latter name as by his former royal title and style.

While this rule is generally observed, and indeed some exiled monarchs are allowed diplomatic passports by their former realm, other republics officially object to the use of such titles which are, nonetheless, generally accorded by extant monarchical regimes. In 1981, the then Greek President Konstantinos Karamanlis declined to attend the wedding of Charles, Prince of Wales when it was revealed that Greece's deposed monarch, a cousin of the Prince, had been referred to as "King" in his invitation. The current Hellenic Republic challenged King Constantine's right to use his title, and his passport was revoked in 1994, because he did not use a surname, as his passport at the time stated "Constantine, former King of the Hellenes". However, Constantine II later travelled in and out of Greece on a Danish diplomatic passport as a descendant of Christian IX of Denmark, by the name Constantino de Grecia (Spanish for "Constantine of Greece").

==== Republics ====
- His/Her Excellency (abbreviation HE, oral address Your Excellency) – Presidents of republics (historically, this was first used to refer to George Washington during his tenure as Commander-in-Chief of the Army during the American War of Independence; its use for presidents of republics was established as he was the first president of the first modern republic). In some countries also the prime minister, ministers, governors, ambassadors and high commissioners also use this style.
- The president of the United States is properly directly addressed as "Mr./Mrs./Ms./Miss./Sir/Madam President" and introduced as "The President of the United States"; however, His/Her/Your Excellency may properly be used in written communications and is sometimes used in official documents.
- The custom in France is to call office holders acting within their official capacity M. (Monsieur) or M^{me} (Madame) followed by the name of their offices. Thus, the president of the republic is called M. le président or M. le président de la République if male, and M^{me}... if female. Styles such as "excellency" or similar are not used, except for talking about foreign dignitaries. Traditionally after "Madame", the name of the office is not put into the feminine form, but this is becoming less common (hence, "Madame le président" is being replaced by "Madame la présidente").
- In Italy, members of the lower house (Chamber of Deputies) of the Parliament of Italy are styled Honourable (Italian: Onorevole, abbreviation On.). The correct form to address a member of the upper house (Senate) is Senator (Italian: Senatore, abbreviation Sen.; even though, for gravitas, they may also be addressed Honourable Senator).
- The incumbent president of Finland is addressed Herra/Rouva Tasavallan Presidentti (Mr./Ms. President of the Republic), while a former president is addressed as just Herra/Rouva Presidentti.
- The style used for the president of Ireland is normally His Excellency/Her Excellency (Irish: A Shoilse/A Soilse); sometimes people may orally address the president as 'Your Excellency' (Irish: A Shoilse [ə ˈhəʎʃə]), or simply 'President' (Irish: A Uachtaráin [ə ˈuəxt̪ˠəɾˠaːnˠ] (vocative case)).
- During the Republic of the United Netherlands, the States-General were collectively addressed as "Their High and Mighty Lords" (Dutch: Hoogmogende Heren).
- The Honourable – Presidents, prime ministers, ministers, governors, members of parliament, senate and congress in some countries. (Australia, Bangladesh, Canada, India, Hong Kong, Singapore, Sri Lanka.)

=== Medicine ===
- Doctor – In the United Kingdom, university degrees required for initial medical and dental professional registration are all bachelor's degrees (commonly MBBS, but also MB, BDS, MB BS BAO, BMed, etc.). This system is followed in other countries (often Commonwealth countries) that adhere to the United Kingdom's higher education tradition. Such graduates are addressed as "doctor" by courtesy and convention.
- Mr, Miss, Ms, or Mrs – Surgeons in the UK, Australia, New Zealand, and other Commonwealth or former Commonwealth nations revert to the title Mr, Miss, Ms or Mrs after obtaining the postgraduate qualification MRCS. Other specialist doctors ("physicians" in the sense of specialists in different areas of internal medicine, as used generally outside North America), on the other hand, retain the title Dr after obtaining other postgraduate qualifications, such as MRCP. Medical practitioners who are both "physicians and surgeons" are called either Dr or Mr, Ms, etc. and the style used at any specific time may be varied according to the context.

=== Nautical and aeronautical ===
- Captain – a person who commands and is responsible for the lives of crew and passengers on a naval or civil vessel or aircraft. In the anglophone navies, captain is usually used regardless of the actual rank of the person being addressed. For example, on a naval vessel commanded by someone holding a rank of lieutenant commander or lower is addressed as "Captain", in reference to their position in command of the ship, not their military rank. This would apply even to an enlisted man in charge of a small boat in some navies, whereas in others the title would be coxswain.

=== Religious ===
- His Holiness (abbreviation HH), oral address Your Holiness, or Holy Father – the Pope and the Pope Emeritus (but Holy Father is not used for the latter); also the Syriac Orthodox Patriarch of Antioch and All the East, Patriarch of Moscow and All Russia, Patriarch of Peć and the Serbs, Catholicos of All Armenians, Catholicos-Patriarch of All Georgia, Catholicos of the Holy See of Cilicia of the Armenian Apostolic Church, Malankara Orthodox Catholicos and some other patriarchs of the Christian Church, as well as the Dalai Lama, the Panchen Lama, the Karmapa, the Sakya Trizin, and other holders of certain other Tibetan Buddhist lineages.
- His All Holiness (abbreviation HAH), oral address Your All Holiness – the Ecumenical Patriarch of Constantinople.
- His Highness the Aga Khan (abbreviation HH the Aga Khan.), oral address Your Highness and then Sir – The Imam (spiritual leader) of the Shia Ismaili Muslims.
- His Beatitude or The Most Blessed, oral address Your Beatitude – Eastern Orthodox, Syriac Orthodox Catholicos of India, Oriental Orthodox and Catholic patriarchs, Macedonian Orthodox Church and the Ukrainian Greek Catholic Major Archbishop of Kyiv-Halych. If they have been elevated to the cardinalate by the Pope, they use the traditional "His Eminence" like other cardinals (more properly and formally, "His Beatitude and Eminence").
- His Most Eminent Royal Highness (abbreviation HMERH), oral address Your Most Eminent Royal Highness – The Lord of the Rasulid Order.
- His Most Eminent Highness (abbreviation HMEH), oral address Your Most Eminent Highness – The Prince and Grand Master of the Sovereign Military Order of Malta.
- His Eminence (abbreviation "H.Em."), oral address Your Eminence or Most Reverend Eminence – Catholic cardinals
- His Eminence (abbreviation "H.Em.") or The Most Reverend (abbreviation The Most Rev.), oral address Your Eminence – Eastern Orthodox metropolitans and archbishops who are not the first hierarch of an autocephalous church;
- His Eminence (abbreviation "H.Em.") – Certain high lamas or rinpoches in Tibetan Buddhism as well as presiding head bishops or priests of Japanese Buddhist schools.
- His Eminence (abbreviation "H.Em.") – The Sultan of Sokoto, spiritual leader of Nigeria's Muslims, as well as those of his fellow Fula high chiefs that choose not to style themselves as HRHs.
- His Eminence (abbreviation "H.Em.") – The Grand Master of the Murjite Order.
- His Excellency or The Most Reverend (abbreviation The Most Rev.), oral address Your Excellency – Catholic archbishops and bishops in the United States and Canada (the oral address is not recognized by Canadian civil authorities, who prescribe Archbishop/Bishop instead); or,
- His Grace or The Most Reverend (abbreviation The Most Rev.), oral address Your Grace – Catholic archbishops in Commonwealth countries except Canada; Catholic bishops in Ireland; and Mar Thoma Metropolitans
- His Grace or The Right Reverend (abbreviation The Rt. Rev.), oral address Your Grace – Eastern Orthodox bishops.
- Kabiyesi (variously translated as His or Her Royal Majesty, His or Her Royal Highness or His or Her Highness, lit. The One whose words are beyond question) – The Obas of Yorubaland, other aboriginal Yoruba high chiefs of royal background, and their counterparts in the tribe's diaspora communities.
- His Lordship or The Right Reverend (abbreviation The Rt. Rev.), oral address My Lord – Anglican and Catholic bishops in Commonwealth countries other than Canada.
- The Most Reverend and Right Honourable (abbreviation The Most Rev. and Rt. Hon.), oral address Your Grace – Church of England (Anglican) archbishops who are privy counsellors, usually the Archbishops of Canterbury and York
- The Most Reverend (abbreviation The Most Rev.), oral address Your Grace – Anglican archbishops, primates, metropolitans and presiding bishops. Canadian Anglican (arch)bishops are orally addressed simply as Archbishop/Bishop. Also moderators.
- The Most Reverend (abbreviation The Most Rev.), oral address My Lord – Church of Ireland (Anglican) Bishop of Meath and Kildare (due to being, historically, the most senior bishop in Ireland)
- The Most Reverend (abbreviation The Most Rev.), oral address Presiding Bishop – the Presiding Bishop of the Methodist Church Ghana
- The Most Reverend (abbreviation The Most Rev.), oral address Bishop – the Presiding Bishop of the Episcopal Church in the United States
- The Right Reverend and Right Honourable Monsignor (abbreviation The Rt. Rev. and Rt.mHon. Mgr.), oral address Monsignor, or according to personal preference – Prelate of Honour who is also a privy counsellor (The Right Reverend and Right Honourable Monsignor Graham Leonard KCVO).
- The Right Reverend and Right Honourable (abbreviation The Rt. Rev. and Rt. Hon.), oral address Bishop or My Lord (old-fashioned) – Church of England (Anglican) bishops who are members of the Privy Council, usually the Bishop of London.
- The Right Reverend (abbreviation The Rt. Rev.), oral address Bishop or My Lord (old-fashioned) – other Church of England bishops
- The Right Reverend (abbreviation The Rt. Rev.), oral address Bishop – bishops Episcopal Church (United States)
- The Right Reverend (abbreviation The Rt. Rev.), oral address Mr./Mrs./Ms./Miss (surname) – Moderator of the United Church of Canada or of the Presbyterian Church in Canada, Moderator of the General Assembly of the Church of Scotland
- The Right Reverend Father (abbreviation The Rt. Rev. Fr.), oral address Father – Eastern Orthodox archimandrites.
- The Right Reverend (abbreviation The Rt. Rev.), oral address Father or Father Abbot – Catholic abbots.
- The Right Reverend (abbreviation The Rt Rev.), oral address Bishop – diocesan bishop of the Methodist Church Ghana
- Bishop, oral address Bishop – an area bishop in the United Methodist Church. The Right Reverend has never been pervasive in the United Methodist Church.
- The Very Reverend (abbreviation The Very Rev. ), oral address Father – Catholic vicars general, judicial vicars, judges, rectors of seminaries, vicars forane, episcopal vicars, general superiors of religious orders of priests, provincial superiors, priors of monasteries or friaries
- The Very Reverend Father (abbreviation The Very Rev. Fr.), oral address Father – Eastern Orthodox archpriests
- The Very Reverend (abbreviation The Very Rev.), oral address Mr./Madam Dean or Mr./Madam Provost, as appropriate, or Very Reverend Sir/Madam – Anglican deans and provosts of cathedrals, the deans of Westminster Abbey and St George's Chapel, Windsor, and, for historical reasons, a few parish priests, such as the Dean of Bocking. Sometimes an Anglican cathedral dean has previously been a bishop, in which case he or she is styled as a bishop, but on formal occasions may be addressed Mr./Madam Dean. Canadian deans are orally addressed as Dean only.
- The Very Reverend (abbreviation The Very Rev.), oral address Very Reverend Sir/Madam or Mr./Madam Dean – Deans of some Anglican seminaries, especially those in the United States
- The Very Reverend (abbreviation The Very Rev.), oral address Osofo Panin – Superintendent minister in the Methodist Church Ghana
- The Very Reverend (abbreviation The Very Rev.), oral address Reverend – former moderators of the United Church of Canada and of the Presbyterian Church in Canada; the Canadian government prescribes the oral address Mr./Mrs./Ms. (surname)
- The Reverend Monsignor (abbreviation The Rev. Msgr.), oral address Monsignor – Catholic Church protonotaries apostolic, honorary prelates, chaplains of his holiness
- The Venerable, oral address Venerable Sir/Madam or Mr./Madam Archdeacon – Anglican archdeacons; in Canada, they are orally addressed as Archdeacon only
- Venerable (abbreviation "Ven."), oral address "Venerable" or "Venerable <name or title>" – fully ordained Buddhist monks and nuns, the title of Venerable Master or Most Venerable is sometimes appended for senior monks and nuns or monks/nuns acting in their capacity as an abbot/abbess of a monastery
- The Reverend and Right Honourable (abbreviation The Revd. and Rt. Hon.) – Protestant ordained ministers who are members of the Privy Council (e.g. the late Ian Paisley)
- The Reverend the Honourable (abbreviation The Rev. the Hon.), oral address according to ecclesiastical or other status – ordained son of an earl, viscount, or baron, or ordained daughter of a viscount or baron (unless also a privy counsellor or peer)
- The Very Reverend (abbreviation "The Very Rev."), oral address: "Overseer" – in the Anglican-Apostolic Communion (Pentecostal) tradition, the overseer is the lowest level of prelate (only non–consecrated bishop prelate), with oversight to a specific work or department, directly responsible to the primate/presiding bishop or an ordinary/diocesan bishop.
- The Reverend (abbreviation The Rev. or The Rev'd) – Protestant and Anglican ordained ministers (common variants include Pastor, Parson, Vicar, or simply Reverend (Rev.), as used in American English; see: The Reverend); some Jewish cantors also use this style, almost all Buddhist ministers in Japan use this style
- The Reverend Canon (abbreviation The Rev. Canon), oral address Canon – Catholic and Anglican canons
- The Reverend Doctor (abbreviation The Rev. Dr.), oral address Father or Doctor – Priests and other ordained clergy with a doctorate
- The Reverend Father (abbreviation The Rev. Fr.), oral address Father – Catholic (and many Anglican) priests
- The Reverend Mother (abbreviation The Rev. Mo.), oral address Mother – Abbesses (also, some female Anglican priests {abbreviated Mthr.})
- The Reverend Deacon (abbreviation Rev. Deacon), oral address Deacon Catholic permanent Deacons.
- The Reverend Mister (abbreviation The Rev. Mr.), oral address Deacon – Catholic transitional deacons, i.e. those preparing for priesthood. Transitional deacons belonging to religious orders (monastic and non-monastic) are titled Reverend Brother, (similar situations and modifications apply to Anglican deacons as in The Rev. Fr./Mthr., above; since women can be deacons, these may be The Revd Ms.)
- Mother, oral address Mother – heads of some female Catholic religious convents and other communities who are not abbesses
- Mister (abbreviation Mr.), oral address Mister – Catholic Sulpician priests
- Mister (abbreviation Mr.), oral address often Mister – Catholic seminarians and scholastics (members preparing for priesthood) of some religious orders (notably, Jesuits).
- Father (pater)
- Brother (abbreviation Bro.), oral address Brother – Catholic members of religious orders under vows (both monastic and non-monastic) who are not priests.
- Sister (abbreviation Sr.), oral address Sister – Catholic members of religious orders under vows (both monastic and non-monastic) who are not abbesses.
- Elder: used generally for male missionaries of the Church of Jesus Christ of Latter-day Saints (LDS Church) and for members of the adult leadership known as the general authorities. Although most all male adults of the LDS church are elders, the title is reserved for the prior mentioned groups.
- Grand Rabbi, oral address Rabbi – Hasidic rabbis, who are scions of a Hasidic Dynasty.
- Dom is an honorific prefixed to the given name. It derives from the Latin dominus. It is used in English for certain Benedictine (including some communities which follow the Rule of St. Benedict) and Carthusian monks, and for members of certain communities of Canons Regular. Examples include Benedictine monks of the English Benedictine Congregation (e.g. Dom John Chapman, late Abbot of Downside). The equivalent female usage for such a monastic is "Dame" (e.g. Dame Laurentia McLachlan, late Abbess of Stanbrook, or Dame Felicitas Corrigan, author).
  - Dom has historically been used on occasions in French, as an honorific for Benedictine monks, such as the famous Dom Pérignon.
- Rabbi, oral address Rabbi (or, if holder of the appropriate degree, Doctor both in oral and written communication) – rabbis
- Grand Ayatullah, oral address Ayatullah or Ayatullah al-Uzma – Shia Ayatullahs, who have accomplished the highest religious jurisprudent knowledge degree called as marja' and some people officially follow them.
- Ayatullah, oral address Ayatullah – Shia religious degree who has accomplished a religious high course of lessons and is capable of individually issuing religious verdicts.
- Seghatoleslam, is an honorific title within the Twelver Shia clergy. Seghatoleslam designates narrators whose justice and trustworthiness have been explicitly verified.
- Amīr al-Mu'minīn (Arabic: أمير المؤمنين), usually translated Commander of the Faithful or Leader of the Faithful, is the Arabic style of some Caliphs and other independent sovereign Muslim rulers that claim legitimacy from a community of Muslims. It has been claimed as the title of rulers in Muslim countries and empires and is still used for some Muslim leaders. The use of the title does not necessarily signify a claim to caliphate as it is usually taken to be, but described a certain form of activist leadership which may have been attached to a caliph but also could signify a level of authority beneath that. The Ottoman sultans, in particular, made scant use of it. Moreover, the term was used by men who made no claim to be caliphs. Currently used by the Caliph of ISIS Abu Bakr al-Baghdadi, The Ahmadiyya Muslim Caliph, Mirza Masroor Ahmad, the King of Morocco, The Sultan of Sokoto, The supreme leaders of the Afghan Taliban.
- Cantor, oral address Cantor (some cantors use The Reverend as style, as above) – Jewish cantors
- Reverend, oral address Reverend, Mister or Brother – ordained ministers/pastors
- Pastor (abbreviation "Pr."), oral address 'Pastor" – minister responsible for caring for the "flock" in Lutheran churches
- Pandit (sometimes spelled Pundit) – Hindu priests
- Swami – in Hinduism an ascetic or yogi who has been initiated into a religious monastic order. Informally, "Swamiji".
- Officers of The Salvation Army are addressed by their rank, e.g. "Captain" (Capt.), "Major" (Maj.), etc.
- A wide variety of titles for Neo-pagan religions; Lord/Lady, Father/Mother, and High Priest/Priestess are common

== In different countries ==
=== Australia ===
- His/Her Majesty – The King or Queen of Australia
- His/Her Excellency The Honourable – Governor-General and his or her spouse, and The Honourable or His/Her Excellency for the rest of state governors (but not their spouse)
- The Honourable – all current and former governors-general and Administrators of the Northern Territory, Justices of the High Court of Australia, the Federal Court of Australia, the Family Court of Australia and state supreme courts
- The Honourable – all current and former members of the Federal Executive Council and all current members of state executive councils and certain former members of state executive councils and long-serving members of state Legislative Councils (upper houses of state parliaments) that have been given the right to keep the title by permission of the governor of that state.
- His/Her Honour (oral address Your Honour) – magistrates and judges in appellate, district and county courts.
- The Right Honourable the Lord Mayor – Lord mayors of Australian cities
- His/Her Worship – Administrators of territories (obsolete), magistrates (obsolete) and mayors.

=== Belgium ===
- His/Her Majesty – The King or Queen of the Belgians
- His/Her Royal Highness – The Duke/Duchess of Brabant and Prince/Princess of Belgium
- His/Her Imperial and Royal Highness – Archduke/Archduchess of Austria-Este
- His/Her Serene Highness:
  - Prince/Princess and Duke/Duchess of Arenberg
  - Duke/Duchess of Beaufort-Spontin
  - Prince/Princess and Duke/Duchess of Croÿ
  - Prince/Princess of Habsburg-Lorraine residing in Belgium
  - Prince/Princess of Lobkowitz residing in Belgium
  - Prince/Princess and Duke/Duchess of Looz-Corswarem
  - Prince/Princess of Stolberg-Stolberg
  - Prince/Princess of Waterloo
- The Well-born:
  - Duke/Duchess
  - Marquess/Marchioness
  - Count/Countess
  - Viscount/Visountess
- The High Well-born:
  - Baron/Baroness
  - Knight
  - Jonkheer/Jonkvrouw

=== Brunei ===
Known as terasul in the Malay language.

- Kebawah Duli Yang Maha Mulia (Kebawah DYMM), equivalent to His or Her Majesty (HM) – for Sultan and his first royal consort. The style is added more depends on the situation:
  - Kebawah Duli Yang Maha Mulia Paduka Seri Sultan, for Sultan before coronation.
  - Kebawah Duli Yang Maha Mulia Paduka Seri Baginda Sultan, for Sultan after coronation.
  - Kebawah Duli Yang Maha Mulia Paduka Seri Pengiran Isteri for the queen consort before coronation
  - Kebawah Duli Yang Maha Mulia Paduka Seri Baginda Raja Isteri for the queen consort after coronation
  - Kebawah Duli Yang Maha Mulia Paduka Seri Raja — for the second wife of the Sultan during coronation
- Kebawah Duli, for a Sultan that has not gone through puberty.
- Duli Yang Maha Mulia Paduka Seri Pengiran Isteri, for the second wife of the Sultan after coronation
- Duli Yang Teramat Mulia (DYTM), equivalent to His or Her Royal Highness (HRH) – for the Crown Prince and his consort and for the abdicated Sultan and his consort.
  - Duli Yang Teramat Mulia Paduka Seri Begawan Sultan — for Sultan that abdicated from the throne
  - Duli Yang Teramat Mulia Paduka Suri Seri Begawan Raja — for the Sultan's consort when the Sultan abdicated from the throne
  - Duli Yang Teramat Mulia Paduka Seri Pengiran Muda Mahkota — for the Crown Prince
  - Duli Yang Teramat Mulia Paduka Seri Pengiran Anak Isteri — for the Crown Prince's consort
- Yang Teramat Mulia (YTM), to His or Her Royal Highness (HRH) – for the children of the Sultan that were born by their royal mother (both parents of the royal mother are royalties and not a commoner)
  - Yang Teramat Mulia Paduka Seri Duli Pengiran Muda — for the Sultan's son that has full royal blood
  - Yang Teramat Mulia Paduka Seri Pengiran Anak Puteri— for the Sultan's daughter by a royal mother (non-commoner)
  - Yang Teramat Mulia Pengiran Babu Raja — for the Queen Consort's mother
- Yang Amat Mulia (YAM), for the consort of a royal prince and their children, and for the Sultan's children by their commoner mother
  - Yang Amat Mulia Pengiran Anak Isteri — for the consort of the Sultan's son (full royal blood)
  - Yang Amat Mulia Pengiran Muda — for the son (full royal blood) of the Sultan's son (full royal blood)
  - Yang Amat Mulia Pengiran Anak — for the children of the Sultan that were born by a commoner mother; daughter (full royal blood) of the Sultan's son (full royal blood); children (full royal blood) of the Sultan's daughter (full royal blood); children (full royal blood) of the Sultan's children (half royal blood)
- Yang Mulia (YM)
  - Yang Mulia Pengiran Anak — for the children that both parents hold the title Pengiran Anak
  - Yang Mulia Pengiran — for the children of a Pengiran Anak and his wife that is not also a Pengiran Anak; non-royal Pengiran (a commoner Pengiran)

=== Canada ===
- His/Her Majesty – King/Queen of Canada
- His/Her Excellency – Governor General, vice-regal consort, ambassadors, and high commissioners in office
- The Right Honourable – Governors general, prime ministers, chief justices of Canada and certain eminent Canadians for life
- His/Her Honour – Lieutenant-governors and viceregal consorts in office
- The Honourable
  - For life – Members of the King's Privy Council for Canada, senators, lieutenant-governors, and members and honorary members of the Executive Councils of Ontario, of Nova Scotia, of Saskatchewan and of Alberta
  - In office only – Speaker of the House of Commons, ministers of the Crown (however, federal ministers invariably enter the Privy Council upon their initial appointment, thus assuming the honorific for life), judges of provincial courts, territorial commissioners, and members of other provincial and territorial executive councils
    - Members of Parliament are often referred to in the House of Commons as "the honourable member for (riding)" but do not use the style honourable with their name.
- The Honourable Mr./Madam Justice – Chief justices of province and justices of superior courts
- His/Her Worship – Justices of the peace, magistrates and municipal leaders in office

=== Chile ===
- His Excellency – granted to the president, and some senior members of the judiciary.
- The Honourable – granted to senators, members of the Chamber of Deputies, and other authorities.

=== Guernsey ===
- Seigneur or Dame – Registered owners of an ancient Norman fief or seigneurie in Guernsey who have registered their Fief with the Crown and Royal Courts. Under the Feudal Dues law of 1980, the government of Guernsey sanctions the use of the style and distinction of Seigneur or Dame.

=== New Zealand ===
- Partial source:
- His/Her Majesty – King of New Zealand
- His/Her Excellency the Right Honourable – the current Governor-General (and the Governor-General's spouse).
- The Right Honourable – the current and former prime ministers, the current and former speakers of the House of Representatives, the current and former chief justices, the current and former governors-general, and those who were appointed to the Privy Council of the United Kingdom.
- The Honourable – the current ministers; former ministers commended by the prime minister; and the current and former judges of the Supreme, High and Appeal courts
- His/Her Honour – judges of district court
- His/Her Worship – mayors of territorial authorities and justices of the peace.

=== Jamaica ===
The Most Honourable – In Jamaica, governors-general, as well as their spouses, are entitled to be styled "The Most Honourable" upon receipt of the Jamaican Order of the Nation. Prime ministers and their spouses are also styled this way upon receipt of the Order of the Nation, which is only given to Jamaican governors-general and prime ministers.

=== India ===
His Excellency/Her Excellency is used before the name of President of India as well as before of governors of the states. However, it is not mandatory for an Indian citizen to use this style to address the president or the governors after a notification from the President House. But it is mandatory for foreigners to address the president and governors.

Your Honour/My Lord – It is used before the names of judges but now it is also not mandatory. The Supreme Court in a hearing said that people need to respect the judges and "Sir" is sufficient for it.

==== Royal styles in India ====
With a long history of rulers, there are many styles which vary from territory to territory and languages for royal families in India, commonly Maharaja (for king), Maharani (queen) whereas for their successors Raja, Rani (Maha meaning "Great" removed). Raj Kumar (title) (for prince) and Raj Kumari (for princess).

Others include Hukam (commonly in Rajasthan), Sardar (kings in territories of Punjab within Sikh Empire), Badshah (Mughal Empire), Vazeer-e-Aala (in Mughal Empire) etc.

=== African traditional rulers ===
In most of Africa, many styles are used by traditional royalty.

Generally the vast majority of the members of these royal families use the titles Prince and Princess, while the higher ranked amongst them also use either Highness or Royal Highness to describe secondary appellations in their native languages that they hold in their realms, appellations that are intended to highlight their relative proximity to their thrones, either literally in the sense of the extant kingships of the continent or symbolically in the sense of its varied chiefships of the name, and which therefore serve a function similar to the said styles of Highness and Royal Highness.

For example, the Yoruba people of West Africa usually make use of the word Kabiyesi when speaking either to or about their sovereigns and other royals. As such, it is variously translated as Majesty, Royal Highness or Highness depending on the actual rank of the person in question, though a literal translation of the word would read more like this: "He (or She) whose words are beyond questioning, Great Lawgiver of the Nation."

Within the Zulu Kingdom of Southern Africa, meanwhile, the monarch and other senior royals are often addressed as uNdabezitha meaning "He (or She) Who Concerns the Enemy", but rendered in English as Majesty in address or reference to the king and his consorts, or Royal Highness in the case of other senior members of the royal family.

=== Hong Kong ===
The Chief Executive is styled as The Honourable.

Certain senior government officials (such as the Chief Secretary for Administration), President of the Legislative Council, members of the Executive Council, and members of the judiciary (such as the Chief Justice of the Court of Final Appeal) are also styled as The Honourable.

=== Ireland ===
In Ireland, holders of offices with Irish names are usually addressed in English by its nominative form (so, 'Taoiseach' and 'Tánaiste'), though the Irish vocative forms differ (a Thaoisigh and a Thánaiste). The President may be styled 'His/Her Excellency' (Irish: A Shoilse, IPA: [ə ˈhəil̠ʲʃə] / A Soilse [ə ˈsˠəl̠ʲʃə]) and addressed 'Your Excellency' (Irish: A Shoilse), or simply 'President' (Irish: A Uachtaráin [ə ˈuəxt̪ˠəɾˠaːnʲ]). The titles 'Minister' and 'Senator' are used as forms of address; only the latter as a style. A TD (Teachta Dála) is formally addressed and styled as 'Deputy', though often simply Mr., Mrs., etc. Similarly, county and city councillors can be addressed as 'Councillor', abbreviated Cllr. which is used as a written style, but are just as frequently addressed as Mr., Mrs., etc.

=== Malaysia ===
- Kebawah Duli Yang Maha Mulia (KDYMM)—
  - equivalent to His or Her Majesty, is for Yang di-Pertuan Agong and His Majesty's consort, the Raja Permaisuri Agong, with the prefix Seri Paduka Baginda added after KDYMM.
  - equivalent to His or Her Royal Highness, is for—
    - the Sultan and the Sultanah of Kedah
    - the Sultan and the Tengku Ampuan Besar of Terengganu or the Sultanah of Terengganu
    - the Sultan of Kelantan
- Kebawah Duli Paduka Baginda (KDPB)—
  - equivalent to His or Her Royal Highness, is for—
    - the Sultan and Tengku Ampuan of Pahang
- Duli Yang Maha Mulia (DYMM)—
  - equivalent to His or Her Majesty, is for the Sultan and the Permaisuri of Johor, or (Queen Consort of Johor).
  - equivalent to His or Her Royal Highness, is for—
    - the Yang di-Pertuan Besar and the Tunku Ampuan Besar of Negeri Sembilan
    - the Raja and the Raja Perempuan of Perlis
    - the Sultan and the Tengku Ampuan of Selangor or the Tengku Permaisuri of Selangor
    - the Sultan of Perak, with the prefix Paduka Seri added after DYMM.
    - the Raja Perempuan of Perak or the Raja Permaisuri of Perak
    - the Sultanah of Pahang
    - the Raja Perempuan of Kelantan or the Sultanah of Kelantan
- Yang Maha Mulia (YMM), equivalent to His or Her Royal Highness, is for all widowed consorts.
- Kebawah Duli Paduka Mulia (KDPM), equivalent to His or Her Highness, is for—
  - the Tengku Mahkota and the Tengku Puan of Pahang
- Duli Yang Teramat Mulia (DYTM), equivalent to His or Her Highness is for—
  - the Raja Muda and the Raja Puan Muda of Kedah
  - the Raja Muda and the Raja Puan Besar of Perak
  - the Yang di-Pertuan Muda and the Tengku Puan Muda of Terengganu
  - the Raja Muda and the Raja Puan Muda of Selangor
- Yang Teramat Mulia (YTM), equivalent to His or Her Highness, is for—
  - the Tengku Mahkota and the Tengku Ampuan Mahkota of Kelantan or the Che Puan Mahkota of Kelantan
  - the Che Puan Muda of Selangor
  - Ruling chiefs of Negeri Sembilan
  - Senior royal family members in royal states
- Duli Yang Amat Mulia (DYAM), equivalent to His or Her Highness, is for—
  - the Tunku Mahkota and the Tunku Puan Mahkota of Kedah
  - Duli Yang Amat Mulia (DYAM), equivalent to His or Her Royal Highness, is for—
  - the Pemangku Sultan of Johor, or (the Regent Sultan of Johor).
  - the Tunku Mahkota of Johor, or (the Crown Prince of Johor).
  - the Raja Muda of Johor, or (the Deputy Crown Prince of Johor).
- Yang Amat Mulia (YAM), equivalent to His or Her Highness, is for royal family members and the Che' Puan Mahkota, the wife of Tunku Mahkota of Johor and to the Che' Puan Muda, the wife of Raja Muda of Johor.
- Yang Mulia (YM), equivalent to His or Her Highness, is for extended royal family members.
- Tuan Yang Terutama (TYT), equivalent to His or Her Excellency, is for governors, high commissioners and ambassadors.
- Yang Amat Berhormat (Mulia) (YABM/YAB), equivalent to the Right Honourable, is for the Prime Minister, the Deputy Prime Minister and the Chief Minister.
- Yang Berhormat (Mulia) (YBM/YB), equivalent to the Honourable, is for—
  - Federal ministers and ministers of state of Sabah and Sarawak
  - Federal deputy ministers
  - members of Johor Royal Court
  - assistant ministers of state of Sabah and Sarawak
  - members of State Executive Councils
  - members of Parliament and State Legislative Assemblies
  - State Secretaries
  - State Legal Advisers in the states of Peninsular Malaysia
  - State Financial Officers in the states of Peninsular Malaysia
  - persons receiving the title of "Dato'" and "Datin Paduka" from Johor
- Yang Amat Arif (YAA), equivalent to the Right Honourable, is for chief judges.
- Yang Arif (YA), equivalent to the Honourable, is for—
  - judges and judicial commissioners
  - Attorney-General of the State of Sarawak
- Yang Amat Dihormati (YAD), equivalent to the Right Honourable, is for royal representatives in districts of Selangor.
- Yang Dihormati (YDh.), equivalent to the Honourable, is for—
  - selected Orang Besar Negeri of Perak
  - high and senior police officers
- Yang Amat Berbahagia (YABhg.) is for—
  - spouses of governors
  - spouses of the Prime Minister, the Deputy Prime Minister and the Chief Minister
  - persons with the title of "Tun"
  - the Orang Besar Empat of Perak
  - spouses of Yang Amat Dihormati
  - commoner spouses of senior royals family
- Yang Berbahagia (YBhg.) is for—
  - the top officials of the Federal Government, namely Chief Secretary to the Government, Attorney General, Chief of Defence Force, Inspector-General of Police, Director General of Public Service and Secretary General of Ministries, with or without any title
  - the Orang Besar Lapan of Perak
  - persons with the title of "Tan Sri" and "Datuk", or equivalent, and their spouses
  - spouses of high commissioners and ambassadors
  - spouses of Yang Berhormat, Yang Amat Arif, Yang Arif, Yang Dihormati, Yang Berbahagia, Yang Amat Setia, Sahibus Samahah, Sahibul Fadhilah and Sahibus Saadah
  - commoner spouses of extended royals family
- Yang Amat Berusaha (YABrs.) is for higher public officers without any title in Kelantan.
- Yang Berusaha (YBrs.) is for—
  - high public officers without any title and their spouses
  - spouses of Yang Amat Berusaha and Yang Setia
- Yang Amat Setia (YAS) is for high military officers without any title.
- Yang Setia (YS) is for senior military officers without any title.
- Sahibus Samahah (SS), equivalent to His Eminence, is for State Muftis.
- Sahibul Fadhilah (SF), equivalent to His Grace, is for State Deputy Muftis, Qadis and senior Ulamas.
- Sahibus Saadah, equivalent to Yang Berbahagia, is special for the Director of Islamic Affairs of Selangor.

=== Morocco ===
- His Majesty – The King of Morocco.
- His Imperial Majesty – The Sultan of Morocco (before 1957, now obsolete).
- His/Her Royal Highness – Prince and princess of Morocco (used for children, grandchildren and siblings of the king as well as for the Princess Consort).
- His/Her Highness – Prince and princess of Morocco (used for cousins, uncles and aunts of the king).
- His/Her Excellency – The Prime Minister of Morocco.

=== Philippines ===
- His/Her Excellency – The president of the Philippines. The title in Filipino is Ang Mahal na Pangulo (The Well-Esteemed President). The honorific for the President of the Philippines was adopted from the title of the governor-general of the Philippines during Spanish and American colonial periods. The president may be addressed as "Your Excellency" or more informally as
- "Mr. President" or "Madam(e) President".
- The Honorable – The vice president of the Philippines, members of the Congress of the Philippines, justices of the Supreme Court of the Philippines, governors and vice governors of provinces, mayors and vice mayors of cities or municipalities, and other elected or appointed officials in the government. The title is also conferred to elected and appointed officials of student or other people's organizations that have great participation in creating, implementing, and interpreting policies of the organization. The title in Filipino is Ang Kagalanggalang (The Honorable). In Senate and congressional inquiries, impeachment procedures, and electoral canvasses, senators, representatives, and officials of the Commission on Elections when they convene as provincial and national boards of canvassers, are mostly addressed as Your Honor, because it was unfortunately rendered from "the Spanish term for addressing parliamentarians, and a mistake made" when Congress's predecessor, the Philippine Legislature, abruptly changed to the use of English from "mainly Spanish in its deliberations."
- His Magnificence the Very Reverend – The rector magnificus of the Pontifical and Royal University of Santo Tomas.
- Sir/Madam(e) – Common informal manner of address.
- Illustrious Knight, Sir/Lady – Titles for members of the Order of the Knights of Rizal, the Philippines' only order of knighthood created by law.
- Paduka Mahasari Maulana al Sultan – The sultan of Sulu.

=== Spain ===
- His/Her Majesty – the monarch of Spain, when referred to as monarch. When referred to as Head of State, he is usually styled "His Excellency the Head of State".
- His/Her Royal Highness – the Prince of Asturias and the Infantes (non-heir apparent royal princes).
- His/Her Excellency (su excelencia) – spouses and children of the Infantes, Grandees of Spain, ministers, either from the central government ("ministros") or from autonomous government ("consejeros"), Knights and Dames of the Collar, Knights and Dames Grand Cross, as well as regional presidents. Mayors and town councils.
- His/Her Illustriousness (su ilustrísima) – marquesses, counts, viscounts, Knights and Dames Commander by Number, junior ministers either from the central government ("secretarios de estado") or from autonomous government ("vice-consejeros"), justices ("magistrados"), certain prosecutors, members of the royal academies and the holders of certain Spanish decorations.
- His/Her Most Excellent and Magnificent Lord – Rector of a university.
- His Lordship/Her Ladyship (su señoría) – barons, members of the Royal Orders (Commander, Officer, Cross), seigneurs, members of parliament, judges, court clerks.
- Lord (Don or Doña) – hidalgos and Spanish citizens who are members of the Royal Orders.

=== Thailand ===
- His/Her Majesty – The King and Queen of Thailand.
- His/Her Royal Highness – Prince and princess of Thailand (used for children and grandchildren of the king) from "Chao-Fa" (เจ้าฟ้า) (the most senior rank of prince/princess) to "Phra Chao Worawongse Ther Phra Ong Chao" (พระเจ้าวรวงศ์เธอ พระองค์เจ้า) (a mid-level, lesser class of prince and princess than Chao Fa). This style is also used for princess consort (now obsolete).
- His/Her Highness – Prince and princess of Thailand of the rank "Phra Worawong Ther Phra Ong Chao" (พระวรวงศ์เธอ พระองค์เจ้า) which are born in the title as Mom Chao to whom the king later granted this higher title, either as recognition of merit, or as a special favour.
- His/Her Serene Highness – Prince and princess of title Mom Chao (m)/Mom Chao Ying (f) (หม่อมเจ้า/หม่อมเจ้าหญิง, abbreviated in Thai as ม.จ. or in English as M.C.) is the most junior class still considered royalty. This is normally when surnames first appear among royal lineages. They are either: Children of a male Chao Fa and a commoner.Children of a male Phra Ong Chao. Informally, they are styled "Than Chai" (m)... /"Than Ying" (f)... (ท่านชาย.../ท่านหญิง...).
- The Honourable – Mom Rajawongse (หม่อมราชวงศ์, RTGS: Mom Ratchawong; abbreviated in Thai as ม.ร.ว. or in English as M.R. and also translated into English as The Honourable) is the title assumed by children of male Mom Chao. The title is pronounced "Mom Rachawong". Informally, they may be styled as "Khun Chai" (m).../ "Khunying" (f)... (คุณชาย.../คุณหญิง...).

=== United Kingdom ===
- His/Her Majesty – the King/Queen.
- His Royal Highness, oral address Your Royal Highness – royal princes.
- Her Royal Highness, oral address Your Royal Highness – royal princesses.
- His Highness (obsolete), or address Your Highness – royal princes.
- Her Highness (obsolete), or address Your Highness – royal princesses.
- His Grace (oral address Your Grace or Duke) – Dukes. Occasionally the Archbishop of Canterbury, the Archbishop of York and other archbishops are also styled His Grace. Duchesses are likewise styled Her Grace.
- Lord – male marquesses, earls, viscounts, and barons, as well as some of their sons. (Style: Your Lordship or My Lord.)
- Lady – marchionesses, countesses, viscountesses, baronesses, and the wives of baronets and knights. (Style: Your Ladyship or My Lady.)
- Sir – males, formally if they have a British knighthood or if they are a baronet.
- Dame – female knights and baronetesses in their own right (suo jure).
- The Right Honourable signifies membership of the Privy Council of the United Kingdom, but does not confer any other title, and is also a formal style of address for certain holders of peerages, namely earls, viscounts, barons, and Lords of Parliament.
- The Right Honourable and Reverend – as the previous explanation, used if the holder is also an ordained clergyman (parliamentary usage).
- The Honourable – younger sons of earls, all children of viscounts and barons, or Lords of Parliament.

"The Right Honourable" is added as a prefix to the name of various collective entities such as:

- The Right Honourable the Spiritual and Temporal Lords (of the Kingdom of England) in the House of Lords.
- The Right Honourable the Lord-Commissioners of the Board of Admiralty.
- The Most Honourable – marquesses, The Lords of His Majesty's Most Honourable Privy Council.
- His Worship is an honorific prefix for mayors, justices of the peace and magistrates in present or former Commonwealth realms. In spoken address, these officials are addressed as Your Worship or referred to as His Worship. In Australia all states now use Your Honour as the form of address for magistrates (the same as has always been used for judges in higher courts).
- The Much Honoured – Scottish barons, chiefs, chieftains and lairds

==== Styles existing through marriage in the United Kingdom ====
Styles can be acquired through marriage, although traditionally this applies more to wives of office-holders than to husbands. Thus, in the United Kingdom, Anne, Princess Royal, is styled Her Royal Highness (HRH), her husband, Sir Timothy Laurence, bears no courtesy style by virtue of being her husband (although his mother-in-law, Queen Elizabeth II, has since knighted him), nor do her children bear any title or style, by right or tradition, despite being in the line of succession to the Crown, until 2015 subject to the Royal Marriages Act 1772. In contrast, when Sophie Rhys-Jones married Prince Edward, she became HRH the Countess of Wessex (&c.) and their children are entitled (although they do not use them) to the princely prefix and the style of HRH, and do bear courtesy titles derived from their father.

Styles and titles can change when a marriage is dissolved. The Lady Diana Frances Spencer held the style Her Royal Highness during her marriage to HRH The Prince of Wales and the title Princess of Wales. When the couple divorced she lost her style: she became instead Diana, Princess of Wales. (although she fit the criteria which customarily accords the prefix of "Lady" to the daughter of an earl, and she had been known as such prior to marriage, she did not revert to that title following divorce).

When applied to the current Princess of Wales, inclusion of a definite article ("The Princess of Wales"), is, like HRH, part of the style which accompanies the title. When King Charles III (Then; HRH the Prince of Wales) was remarried to Camilla Parker Bowles in compliance with the Royal Marriages Act, she lawfully became HRH The Princess of Wales but, as was the announced intention prior to the couple's wedding, she continued to use the lesser title derived from her husband's Duchy of Cornwall and was known as HRH The Duchess of Cornwall, until the accession of her husband as King, because of the strong association to Diana, Princess of Wales.

From the divorce until her death in 1997, Diana, Princess of Wales ceased to hold any royal style, although the monarch declared that she remained a Princess of the United Kingdom and in occasions when members of the Royal Family appeared in public, she continued to be accorded the same royal precedence.

When Sarah Ferguson was divorced from her husband, the then HRH Prince Andrew, Duke of York (later Andrew Mountbatten-Windsor), she too lost her HRH style, the rank as a British Princess and was re-styled as "Sarah, Duchess of York".

In 1936, Wallis Simpson was denied the HRH style by George VI when she married his older brother, the former Edward VIII, who became HRH the Duke of Windsor following his abdication and receipt of a peerage.

=== United States ===
The names of most current and former elected federal and state officials and judges in the United States are styled "The Honorable" in writing, (e.g., "The Honorable Clint Scherf, Mayor of the City of Grants Pass"). Many are addressed by their title in conversation as "Mister" or "Madam" ("Mr. President", "Madam Mayor") or simply by their name with their appropriate title e.g., "Senator Jones" or "Commissioner Smith".

Continued use of a title after leaving office depends on the office: those of which there is only one at a time (e.g., president, speaker, governor, or mayor) are only officially used by the current office holder. However, titles for offices of which there are many concurrent office holders (e.g., ambassador, senator, judge, professor or military ranks, especially colonel and above) are retained for life: A retired U.S. Army general is addressed as "General (Name)" officially and socially for the rest of their life. Military retirees are entitled to receive pay and are still counted as members of the United States Armed Forces. Accordingly, all retired military ranks are retained for life pursuant to Title 10 of the United States Code. In the case of the President, while the title is officially dropped after leaving office – e.g., Dwight Eisenhower reverted to his prior style "General Eisenhower" in retirement – it is still widely used as an informal practice; e.g., Jimmy Carter was often called President Carter during his lifetime. The Vice President is typically referred to as "former Vice President", such as "former Vice President Mike Pence." Similarly, governors are typically addressed in later life as "Governor (Name)", particularly if running for further political office. Mitt Romney, for example, was frequently referred to as "Governor Romney" during his 2012 presidential campaign and was addressed as such formally in the debates, having been Governor of Massachusetts until 2007.

- The names of judges are styled "The Honorable" in writing, and orally in court as "Your Honor", or by name after "Judge". Chief justices of supreme courts are addressed orally as "Mr. or Madam Chief Justice" or "Chief Justice"; associate justices by name with "Justice" (or, simply "Justice").
- The names of mayors are styled "The Honorable" in writing. In municipalities (e.g., New York City and Chicago), mayors are addressed in conversation as "Your Honor". This may be a vestige of the fact that the mayors (and some others) were also magistrates of the court system.
- His or Her Excellency (oral address "Excellency", "Your Excellency") was once customarily used of governors of states, though this has given way to "The Honorable", the form used to address all elected officials in the United States. "Excellency" has continued in the Commonwealths of Massachusetts and Virginia and the states of South Carolina, Georgia, New Hampshire, and Connecticut.
- The names of United States representatives are similarly styled in writing as "The Honorable". Orally they are traditionally addressed by name as "Mr." or "Ms.", but as a practice are sometimes addressed as "Representative" or "Congressman" or "Congresswoman" when it is necessary or desirable to specify the member's status. It is advisable to follow the preference of the individual official. Following precedence in Westminster style of parliament, when writing their own names, especially on stationery and franks, representatives have upon occasion followed their names with "M.C." (Member of Congress). The names of senators similarly are addressed in writing as "The Honorable" and orally as "Senator". Where representatives may have used "M.C.", senators have used "U.S.S." (United States Senator). However, neither form is currently used by members in Washington, DC. On the actual floor of the houses during debate, members commonly refer to one another as the gentleman or gentlewoman from their appropriate state (e.g., "As my friend, the distinguished gentleman from Ohio, just said..." or "I yield three minutes to the gentleman from New York, Mr. Smith"). In debate, senators sometimes refer to colleagues as the junior or senior senator from a state, (e.g., "I disagree with my dear friend, the junior senator from Ohio..."). Senators also commonly use this form of address.
- While the term "Esquire", abbreviated "Esq." after the name (John Jones, Esq.), has no legal meaning in the U.S. and may be used by anyone (or at least, customarily, by any male), it is correctly used when addressing lawyers in correspondence as an indication of their profession. At least one American jurisdiction, the District of Columbia, limits the use of "Esquire" (and similar terms) to licensed attorneys. Although some authorities previously urged that use of "Esq." should be restricted to male lawyers, today the term is used for both male and female attorneys. The academic post-nominal J.D. (Juris Doctor) may be used by graduates of law schools who are not members of the bar of any state or who are working outside the legal profession.
- In academic fields, it is customary in the U.S. to refer to those holding any level of professorship (professor, assistant professor, associate professor, adjunct professor, etc.) as "Professor" – as in "Professor Jones" – orally or in writing. In writing, "professor" is often abbreviated as "Prof.", as in "Prof. Jones". Those holding academic doctorates are frequently referred to as "Dr. Jones."
- Military personnel of any functionality (doctors, lawyers, engineers, cooks, fighter pilots, motor pool drivers, commanding officers, security guards ... officers and enlisted ... leaders and followers) are always addressed by rank + name; with the exception of chaplains, who are addressed as "Chaplain" and are addressed in writing with their rank in parentheses, e.g.: "Chaplain (Major) Jones". An exception to this is in the Navy, where in writing the rank is either not used, or is used before the person's name with the corps designator "CHC" indicating the officer is a chaplain put behind their name. e.g.: "LT George Burdell, CHC, USN". In the United States Navy, there is an internal practice aboard ships that junior officers who are not in command may be addressed by their rank or as "Mister/Miss X" as in "Lieutenant Junior Grade Smith" or "Miss Smith". This practice is also followed within the United States Coast Guard, both aboard ship and ashore. Junior officers in both services are understood to be those of lieutenant commander and below. Senior officers (commander and above) are addressed by their rank as in "Commander Smith" or "Admiral Smith". While officially this manner of address is supposed to be from a senior rank to a junior rank, i.e. captain to lieutenant, in practice it is not unknown for enlisted personnel to refer to junior officers as Mister as well. While commonly referred to by their rank, i.e. Seaman/Airman/Fireman/Petty Officer X or (Senior/Master) Chief X, on formal occasions, e.g. weddings, an enlisted man's full title is sometimes used, starting with their rating, then their rank, and their name, e.g. Electronics Technician Second Class X or Chief Gunner's Mate Y. When written, e.g. in formal invitations, the enlisted man's name is written as "Serviceman's name, USN/USMC/USA/USAF/USCG", without one's rank preceding their name, unlike commissioned officers.
- Any officer in command of a ship is referred to as Captain for the period of their command or in reference to the ship, regardless of what rank they normally hold.
- Retired military personnel may continue to be addressed by their rank at the time of their retirement. Those who held 'brevet' ranks higher than their permanent rank (permanent Army officers who held temporary rank in volunteer regiments during the American Civil War) also held this honor; though all such individuals have now perished, this usage is often seen in historical or fictional sources placed in the 1865–1900 period.
- Hamilton v. Alabama, 376 U.S. 650 (1964), is a United States Supreme Court case in which the court held that an African-American woman, Mary Hamilton, was entitled to the same courteous forms of address customarily reserved solely for whites in the Southern United States, and that calling a black person by their first name in a formal context was "a form of racial discrimination".

== Former styles ==
All former monarchies had styles, some, such as those of the Bourbon monarchy of France, extremely complicated depending on the status of the office or office-holder. Otto von Habsburg, who was Crown Prince of Austria-Hungary (1916–1918), had the style 'His Imperial and Royal Highness'. He was last addressed as such by church figures during the funeral of his late mother, Empress-Queen Zita of Austria-Hungary in 1989, although the use of these styles has been prohibited in Austria since 1920.

For the styles of address to government officials in Imperial Russia, see Table of Ranks.

The names of some offices are also titles, which are retained by the office holder for life. For example, holders of titles of which there are many at the same time, such as ambassadors, senators, judges, and military officers, who retire retain use of their hierarchical honorific for life. Holders of titles of which there is only one office holder at a time such as president, chief justice or speaker revert to their previous honorific when they leave office out of deference to the current office holder.

== Other parallel symbols ==
Styles were often among the range of symbols that surrounded figures of high office. Everything from the manner of address to the behaviour of a person on meeting that personage was surrounded by traditional symbols. Monarchs were to be bowed to by men and curtsied to by women. Senior clergy, particularly in the Catholic Church, were to have their rings (the symbol of their authority) kissed by lay persons while they were on bended knee, while cardinals in an act of homage at the papal coronation were meant to kiss the feet of the Supreme Pontiff, the Pope.

Many of these traditions have lapsed or been partially abandoned. At his inauguration as pope in 1978, Pope John Paul II himself cardinals on the cheeks, rather than follow the traditional method of homage of having his feet kissed.

Some styles are used less often. The former President of Ireland, Mary McAleese, was usually referred to as President Mary McAleese, not President McAleese, as had been the form used for the first six presidents, from President Hyde to President Hillery. Tony Blair asked initially to be called Tony. First names, or even nicknames, are often widely used among politicians in the US, even in formal situations (as an extreme example, President James Earl "Jimmy" Carter chose to take the Oath of Office using his nickname). One notable exception involves judges: a judge of any court is almost invariably addressed as "Your Honor" while presiding over his or her court, and often at other times as well. This style has been removed in the Republic of Ireland, where judges are addressed only as "Judge".

However, styles are still widely used in formal documents and correspondence between heads of state, such as in a letter of credence accrediting an ambassador from one head of state to another.

== Self-styled ==
The term self-styled, or soi-disant, roughly means awarding a style to oneself, often without adequate justification or authority, but the expression often refers to descriptions or titles (such as "aunt", "expert", "Doctor", or "King"), rather than true styles in the sense of this article.

== See also ==
- Forms of address in the United Kingdom
- Forms of address in Spain
- Forms of address in the Russian Empire
- List of titles
- Suffix (name)
- Title
- T–V distinction

== Notes ==
^{1} Though the Republic of Ireland does not possess a Privy Council, the style is still used. The Lord Mayor of Dublin is still styled the Right Honourable, as previous lord mayors of Dublin were ex-officio members of the former Irish Privy Council until its abolition in 1922.
