= Forms of address in the Russian Empire =

Formal addressing to persons in Russian Empire

From the time of Peter the Great, forms of address in the Russian Empire had been well-codified, determined by a person’s title of honor, as well as military or civil rank (see Table of Ranks) and ecclesiastical order. One’s position within the clergy was considered most important, followed by title, and then by civil/military rank (e.g., a commoner in rank of Privy Councilor would be styled His Excellency) a prince of the same rank would retain the style of His Highness, while the same prince serving as an archbishop would be referred as His High Eminence. All of these styles are now obsolete and are only used in historical context.

Aristocratic styles
Style	Transliteration	Translation	Addressee
Ваше Императорское Величество	Vashe Imperatorskoye Velichestvo	Your Imperial Majesty	the Emperor, Empress and Dowager Empress of Russia
Ваше Императорское Высочество	Vashe Imperatorskoye Vysochestvo	Your Imperial Highness	Grand Dukes and Grand Duchesses (i.e. Imperial children and grandchildren; from 1797 to 1886 the title applied to great- and great-great-grandchildren as well)
Ваше Высочество	Vashe Vysochestvo	Your Highness	Princes and Princesses of the Imperial bloodline
Ваша Светлость	Vasha Svyetlost	Your Serene Highness	Younger children of Imperial great-grandchildren and their descent; Serene Princes
Ваше Сиятельство	Vashe Siyatelstvo	Your Illustrious Highness	Princes, Counts
Ваше Благородие	Vashe Blagorodiye	Your Well Born	Barons and untitled nobility

Ecclesiastical styles
Style	Transliteration	Translation	Addressee
Ваше Святейшество	Vashe Svyateyshestvo	Your Holiness	the Patriarch
Ваше Высокопреосвященство	Vashe Vysokopreosvyaschenstvo	Your Eminence	Metropolitan Bishops and Archbishops
Ваше Преосвященство	Vashe Preosvyaschenstvo	Your Grace	Bishops
Ваше Высокопреподобие	Vashe Vysokoprepodobiye	The High Reverend	Archimandrites, Hegumens (Abbots), Protopresbyters and Archpriests
Ваше Преподобие	Vashe Prepodobiye	The Reverend	Hieromonks and Priests
Ваше Высокоблаговестие	Vashe Vysokoblagovestie	Your High Evangelism	Archdeacons, Protodeacons
Ваше Благовестие	Vashe Blagovyestiye	Your Evangelism	Deacons
Ваше Боголю́бие	Vashe Bogolubie	Your Beloved of God	Subdeacons, Readers, Cantors, Canonarchs, Candle-bearers

Bureaucratic styles
Style	Trasliteration	Translation	Addressee
Ваше Высокопревосходительство	Vashe Vysokoprevoskhoditelstvo	Your High Excellency	Table of Ranks Grades I and II
Ваше Превосходительство	Vashe Prevoskhoditelstvo	Your Excellency	Table of Ranks Grades III and IV
Ваше Высокородие	Vashe Vysokorodiye	Your High Born	Table of Ranks Grade V
Ваше Высокоблагородие	Vashe Vysokoblagorodiye	Your High Well Born	Table of Ranks Grades VI to VIII
Ваше Благородие	Vashe Blagorodiye	Your Well Born	Table of Ranks Grades IX to XIV

== See also ==
- East Slavic honorifics
