= Highness =

Form of address used for certain royal and other persons

Highness (in address Your Highness and in reference His/Her Highness and Their Highnesses, the latter two abbreviated respectively H.H. and T.H.) is a formal style used to address (in second person) or refer to (in third person) certain members of a reigning or formerly reigning dynasty. It is typically used with a possessive adjective: "His Highness", "Her Highness" (HH), "Their Highnesses" (TH), etc. Although often combined with other adjectives of honour indicating rank, such as "Imperial", "Royal" or "Serene", it may be used alone.

Highness is, both literally and figuratively, the quality of being lofty or above. It is used as a term to evoke dignity or honour, and to acknowledge the exalted rank of the person so described.

== History in Europe ==
Abstract styles arose in profusion in the Roman Empire, especially in the Byzantine. Styles were attached to various offices at court or in the state. In the early Middle Ages such styles, couched in the second or third person, were uncertain and much more arbitrary, and were more subject to the fancies of secretaries than in later times.

In English usage, the terms Highness, Grace and Majesty were all used as honorific styles of kings, queens and princes of the blood until the time of James VI and I. Thus in documents relating to the reign of Henry VIII of England, all three styles are used indiscriminately; an example is the king's judgment against Dr. Edward Crome (d. 1562), quoted, from the Lord Chamberlains' books, ser. I, p. 791, in Trans. Roy. Hist. Soc. N.S. lOX. 299, where article 15 begins with Also the Kinges Highness hath ordered, 16 with Kinges Majestie, and 17 with Kinges Grace. In the Dedication of the Authorized Version of the Bible of 1611, James I is still styled Majesty and Highness; thus, in the first paragraph: "the appearance of Your Majesty, as of the Sun in his strength, instantly dispelled those supposed and surmised mists ... especially when we beheld the government established in Your Highness and Your hopeful Seed, by an undoubted title". It was, however, in James I's reign that Majesty became the official style.

== Continental Europe ==
At the conclusion of the Congress of Vienna in 1815, His/Her Highness (abbreviated HH), became prevalent for reigning dukes and members of their dynasties in Germany (e.g., Anhalt, Brunswick, Nassau, the three Ernestine duchies of Saxe-Coburg and Gotha, Saxe-Meiningen, and Saxe-Altenburg, as well as Schleswig-Holstein); for cadets of some German grand ducal houses (e.g., Hesse, Mecklenburg-Schwerin, Mecklenburg-Strelitz, Oldenburg, Saxe-Weimar-Eisenach); and cadet members of some imperial or royal families (e.g., Bavaria, Denmark, the Netherlands, Norway, Portugal, Prussia, Russia, Yugoslavia). That custom remains official in the Dutch and Norwegian dynasties. The Almanach de Gotha and Burke's Peerage continued to ascribe Highness to members of deposed dynasties of ducal rank.

Among the nobility, the Almanach de Gotha notes that Highness was accorded to the heads of the families of Murat (a royal dynasty during the Napoleonic era), Hohenberg, Teck and all members of the House of Ligne.

The style was discontinued in the Danish royal family in 2023, having been applied to junior lines for many generations.

Example of official holders of the style Highness:

- His Highness Prince Maurits of Orange-Nassau, Van Vollenhoven, son of HRH Princess Margriet of the Netherlands and Mr. Pieter van Vollenhoven, the maternal grandson of HM Queen Juliana of the Netherlands, and nephew of HM Queen Beatrix. Upon his mother's marriage, it was decreed that her children would be known as HH Prince(ss) <name> of Orange-Nassau, Van Vollenhoven.

== Modified forms ==
Usually members of an imperial or royal dynasty are addressed as Imperial Highness or Royal Highness (French Altesse Impériale, Altesse Royale; German Kaiserliche Hoheit, Königliche Hoheit; Spanish Alteza Imperial, Alteza Real, etc.) respectively.

Grand Ducal Highness was the treatment accorded cadet princes of those families of ruling grand dukes who did not simply use "Highness", viz. Baden.

While "Highness" (Hoheit) was used for rulers of German duchies, the sovereign Dukes of Modena and of Parma were heads of cadet branches of ruling dynasties of higher rank. They and their cadets therefore used the imperial or royal styles borne by members of those houses, respectively the royal House of Bourbon and the imperial House of Habsburg-Lorraine.

In modern times, Serene Highness (Altesse Sérénissime) is used as the equivalent of the German Durchlaucht. In the 17th century, it became the general style borne by the heads of the reigning princely states of the Holy Roman Empire (reichsständische Fürsten), as "Illustrious Highness (Erlaucht) became customary for those of the comital houses (reichsständische Grafen, i.e. Counts of the Empire). In 1825, the Imperial German Diet agreed to grant the style Durchlaucht to the heads of all mediatized princely houses domiciled in Germany elevated to the rank of Fürst are also styled Durchlaucht. In 1829, the style of Erlaucht, which had formerly been borne by the reigning Counts of the empire, was similarly granted to the mediatized countly families (Almanach de Gotha, 1909, 107).

His Exalted Highness is a rare hybrid of the title style Highness. It is used as a salutation style only for the Nizams of Hyderabad and Berar conferred by the British Government.

== Commonwealth realms ==
Highness was the style accorded to princes of the British royal family who were the male-line great-grandchildren of a British sovereign (and the wives/widows of great-grandsons), except the eldest son of the Prince of Wales. In 1917, George V revoked authorization for use of that style.

The children and grandchildren in the male-line of a British sovereign were and are addressed as Royal Highness (His or Her Royal Highness, abbreviated HRH), as are the children of the eldest son of the Prince of Wales (decree of 31 May 1898). The sovereign has the right as a legal fons honorum to grant or revoke use of the style of Highness, as with other styles, titles and honours.

== Colonial use ==
- In the British Empire, the style (His) Highness became reserved for the elite of the feudatory dynastic heads of the major princely states (mainly in India and other territories—as on the Persian Gulf coast—once under the East India Company).
- In various other empires, such as the Dutch East Indies (see List of regencies and cities of Indonesia), a similar system was introduced.

== Modern Islamic World ==
=== Royal Afghanistan ===
In Afghanistan the title Jalalat Mahab is used for Sardars, or Princes of the former Muhammadzai dynasty, who are descendants of the Afghan Emir Payindah Muhammad Khan Barakzai. Although Jalalat Mahab is derived from the Arabic term Jalalat literally meaning His Majesty, it is regarded as equal to His Highness internationally. A legal ground for it is a strengthened ius cogens within the Afghan royal family with gateways in the first written constitution of Afghanistan issued by Abdur Rahman Khan in year 1890 and amended by Amanullah Khan in year 1923.

Prince Daoud Khan, a member of the Telai cadet branch and Cousin of the last Afghan King Zahir Shah, acting as prime minister under his cousin held the address Jalalat Mahab Aali Qadr Sardari Alaa (English His Honorable Highness the sublime Prince) during his term as Prime Minister.

After the constitution of 1964 that changed Afghanistan's state system from an absolute to a constitutional monarchy, the descendants of King Nadir Shah held the exclusive address as Alaa Hazrat in which context Hazrat is Turkish and means Majesty or Highness and thus literally translated means Higher Majesty or Higher Highness and is internationally also equal to His Royal Highness. Jalalat Mahab was still used for other cadet branches by customary law and in light of the law of royal expenses, based on Article 13 and 24 of the Royal Constitution of 1964. Cadet branches include:

- Telai, descendants of Sultan Mohammed Khan, including Prince Daoud Khan
- Seraj, descendants of Dost Mohammed Khan
- and Shaghasi, descendants of other children of Payindah Muhammad Khan

The King himself held the title Alaa Hazrat Humayoon which literally translated means His Most Noble Majesty, and can be equalized with His Majesty internationally.

Despite the de facto fall of Barakzai leadership through the Soviet Invasion in year 1978, the address is until today still used out of courtesy.

=== Saudi Arabia ===
In Saudi Arabia, all members of the royal family have the title of Emir (Prince) but sons, daughters, patrilineal granddaughters and grandsons of Ibn Saud are referred to by the style "His Royal Highness" (HRH), differing from those belonging to the cadet branches who are styled as "His/Her Highness" (HH), and in addition to that a reigning king has the title of Custodian of the Two Holy Mosques.

The definition of the cadet branches has been legally defined in year 2000 by King Abdullah and includes the following:

- Al Jiluwi, descendants of Prince Jiluwi bin Turki al Saud acting as closest allies to King Abdul Aziz
- Al Kabeer, descendants of Saud Al Kabeer, who allied with King Abdul Aziz against the Rashidi State
- Al Thunayan Al Mishari and Al Farhan, who descend from brothers of the dynastic founder Muhammad bin Saud al Muqrin

=== Gulf States ===
The Emirs of Kuwait, Qatar and the United Arab Emirates also use the style of "Highness".

=== Iraq ===
Patrilineal descendants of former ruling Emirs of Iraq use His Highness for the head of the house

=== Aga Khan ===
The Aga Khan was granted the style of His Highness by Elizabeth II, Queen of the United Kingdom in 1957 upon the death of his grandfather Aga Khan III. This has been a traditional gesture by British sovereigns since the Aga Khan III allied himself with Britain against Afghanistan.

The style of His Highness was formally granted to the Aga Khan IV's successor and eldest son, Aga Khan V, by King Charles III on 10 February 2025.

== Republican and non-royal usage ==
Very rarely, the style of Highness or variations thereof have been used by non-monarchical heads of state, particularly before the 20th century, and often in cases where the distinction between monarchy and republic was blurred. For example, Oliver Cromwell and his wife were styled "Highness" upon his elevation to Lord Protector of the Commonwealth; he also enjoyed the style of by the Grace of God, was succeeded by his son, and had even been offered the throne.

=== Spanish-speaking world ===
In the Spanish-speaking world, a handful of leaders historically enjoyed the official, if often ephemeral, style of Highness (Alteza) or variations thereof.

In Spain, Manuel Godoy, who twice served as Prime Minister from 1792 to 1797 and from 1801 to 1808, was granted the style of Most Serene Highness (Su Alteza Serenísima) in 1807 by King Charles IV. He had been created Principe de la Paz ("Prince of the Peace") in 1795, but the princely title did not carry the style of Highness on its own. The former style was possibly derived from the traditional Spanish honorific of Excelentísimo Señor (The Most Excellent).

Baldomero Espartero, Prince of Vergara, who was regent for Queen Isabella II from 1840 to 1843, and three times served as Prime Minister: in 1837, from 1840 to 1841, and from 1854 to 1856, was created Prince of Vergara with the exceptional (and not strictly non-royal) style of Royal Highness (Alteza Real) in 1872. Espartero had previously declined an offer to the throne following the Spanish Revolution of 1868, which instead went to the Italian Amadeo of Savoy, who in turn bestowed the royal princedom on him.

Furthermore, according to the provisions of Royal Decree 1368/1987 promulgated by King Juan Carlos I in 1987, a Regent of Spain is to enjoy the style of Highness (as well as protocolary honours equal to those of the Prince of Asturias), unless they were to possess rank conferring a higher style.

During the short-lived Luz de America uprising of 1809 in modern-day Ecuador, the Junta de Gobierno Autónoma de Quito ("Autonomous Government Junta of [the Royal Audiencia of] Quito"), granted its president, Juan Pío de Montúfar, 2nd Marquis of Selva Alegre, the style of Most Serene Highness, while claiming for itself the collective dignity of "Majesty" (as it purported to be acting in the name of King Ferdinand VII). Selva Alegre's pseudo-monarchical government, which was formed following Napoleon's invasion of Spain in 1808 and lasted for a mere seventy-five days, was considered by both contemporaries and later historians to be a thinly-disguised effort to establish a "Kingdom of Quito"; Selva dressed himself in regal vestments, bestowed honours on citizens, and instituted the National Order of San Lorenzo (which was much later revived by Ecuadorian President Camilo Ponce Enríquez in 1959).

Antonio López de Santa Anna, enjoyed the official style of Most Serene Highness during his eleventh and final tenure as President of Mexico for life from 1853 until his deposal in 1855.

=== Elsewhere ===
==== United States ====
Shortly before the inauguration of George Washington as the first President of the United States, then-Vice President John Adams organised a congressional committee on the matter of the title and style of the President. There Adams agitated for the adoption of the style of Highness (as well as the title of Protector of Their [the United States'] Liberties) for the President. Others favored the variant of Electoral Highness or the lesser Excellency, the latter of which was vociferously opposed by Adams, who contended that it was far beneath the presidential dignity, as the executives of the states, some of which were also titled "President" (e.g. the President of Pennsylvania), at that time often enjoyed the style of Excellency; Adams said that the President "would be levelled with colonial governors or with functionaries from German princedoms" if he were to use the style of Excellency. On further consideration, Adams deemed even Highness insufficient and instead proposed that the Executive, both the President and the Vice President (i.e., himself), be styled Majesty, with only which the "great danger" of insufficient dignity being attached to the executive could be solved. Adams' efforts were met with widespread derision and perplexion; Thomas Jefferson called them "the most superlatively ridiculous thing I ever heard of", while Benjamin Franklin considered it "absolutely mad". The proposal came to naught, and American Presidents, from Washington onwards, have eschewed honorific titles and styles altogether and are simply referred to as Mr. President.

==== Samoa ====
In modern-day Samoa, the O le Ao o le Malo, the Samoan head of state, has since the country's independence enjoyed the title of Highness, as do the heads of the four paramount chiefly dynasties. However, as all of the heads of state, elected by the Fono, the country's parliament (which is itself almost entirely composed of customary chiefs), since independence have been one of the four chiefs, it is ambiguous as to whether the country constitutes a republic or an elective monarchy.

==== Africa ====
African royalty commonly use "Highness" to refer to their junior dynasts. Some ranking monarchs also make use of the style. An example of the former is Princess Elizabeth Bagaya of the Tooro Kingdom in Uganda. An example of the latter is the princess' sister-in-law, Queen Best Kemigisa.

== Other uses ==
Regardless of the official traditions in the various colonial empires, the style is evidently used to render, often merely informally, various somewhat analogous titles in non-western cultures, regardless whether there is an actual linguistic and/or historical link. Furthermore, in North America, some chiefs of certain indigenous tribes or nations use the style of Highness, which may or may not be recognised by their governments.

== Variations and precedence ==
While the actual precedence depends on the rank itself, and sometimes more specifically on the monarchy, rather than on the style of address, the holders tend to end up roughly in the following order of precedence:

- His/Her Imperial and Royal Highness (HI&RH)
- His/Her Imperial Highness (HIH)
- His/Her Royal Highness (HRH)
- His/Her Grand Ducal Highness (HGDH), used by junior members of the houses of Luxembourg, Grand Ducal Hesse, and Baden
- His/Her Highness (HH)
- His/Her Exalted Highness (HEH), used only by the Nizam of Hyderabad, the pre-eminent Indian princely ruler
- His/Her Sultanic Highness (HSH), a rare, hybrid western-Islamic honorific style, exclusively used by the son, daughter-in-law and daughters of Sultan Hussein Kamel of Egypt
- His/Her Ducal Serene Highness (HDSH)
- His Most Eminent Highness (HMEH), a hybrid with His Eminence, created in 1630 for the Grand Master of the Knights of Malta, as Prince of the Holy Roman Empire at par with a Cardinal (Prince of the Church).
- His/Her Most Serene Highness (HMSH)
- His/Her Serene Highness (HSH)
- His/Her Illustrious Highness (HIll.H)
- His/Her Tribal Highness (HTH), a rare hybrid of Highness exclusively used by Amghar Mohammed Ameziane, Prince of the Rif and direct descendants.

== See also ==
- Excellency
- Majesty
- Monsignor
- Sire
