= Wohlgeboren =

Wohlgeboren (German: [ˈvoːlɡəˌboːɐ̯n̩], lit. "well-born") was a form of address for the lowest ranks of German nobility. The Latin version of this term is "spectabilis".

== German usage ==
The actual address was (Euer) Wohlgeboren, it is the proper form of address for a Vogt or Büttel

== Swedish usage ==
"Välborne" for untitled Swedish nobility and "högvälborne" for counts and barons.

== Higher form of address ==
The title should not be confused with the following, in order of increasing rank:

- (Euer) Hochwohlgeboren (lit. highly well-born), the form of address for German barons (Freiherren), nobles (Edle) and knights (Ritter);
- (Euer) Hochgeboren (lit. high-born'), the proper form of address for members of the titled German nobility, ranking just below the sovereign and mediatised dynasties;
- Erlaucht (Illustrious Highness), the correct address for those German immediate counts (Reichsgrafen) who are heirs of mediatised families of the Holy Roman Empire;
- Durchlaucht (Serene Highness), the correct address for German princes (Fürsten) and dukes (Herzog).
