= Sten Lewenhaupt =

Swedish nobleman, diplomat and archivist (1882–1969)

High Well-born Count Sten Lewenhaupt KVO2kl FVRK RNO
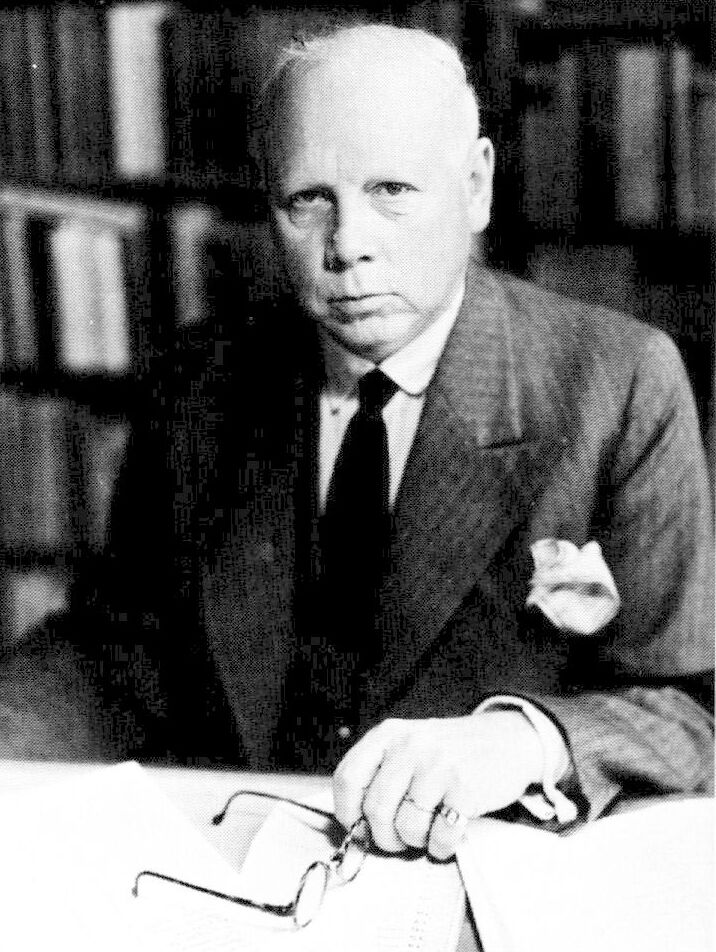
- Photograph of Lewenhaupt, unknown date.
- Born: 27 February 1882; Östra Vingåker Parish, Södermanland, Sweden
- Died: 7 September 1969 (aged 87); Katrineholm Parish, Södermanland, Sweden
- Spouses: Signe Wilhelmina Lindgren (m. 1933; died 1945) Martha Elvira Crafoord (m. 1946; died 1951) Christina Elisabeth Wilhelmina Dyrssen (m. 1953; died 1969)
- Family: Lewenhaupt family
- Awards: See honours

Sten Mauritz Carl Lewenhaupt (27 February 1882 – 7 September 1969) was a Swedish nobleman, diplomat and archivist.

== Biography ==
He first intended to join the cavalry, but opted to study humanities at Uppsala University instead. In 1809, he was promotad attaché of the Ministry for Foreign Affairs of Sweden and published registers and collections of treaties, including editor of Utrikesdepartementets kalender, for many years. The history of chivalric orders and people, was his main area of interest. His sense for cadastral data made Svenska högre ämbetsmän från 1634 an extraordinary resource to historians and other researchers. He was also an archivist, and later librarian, of the Ministry for Foreign Affairs, and was made head of the Office of Encipherment in 1919. In 1947, he retired and moved back to his province of origin.

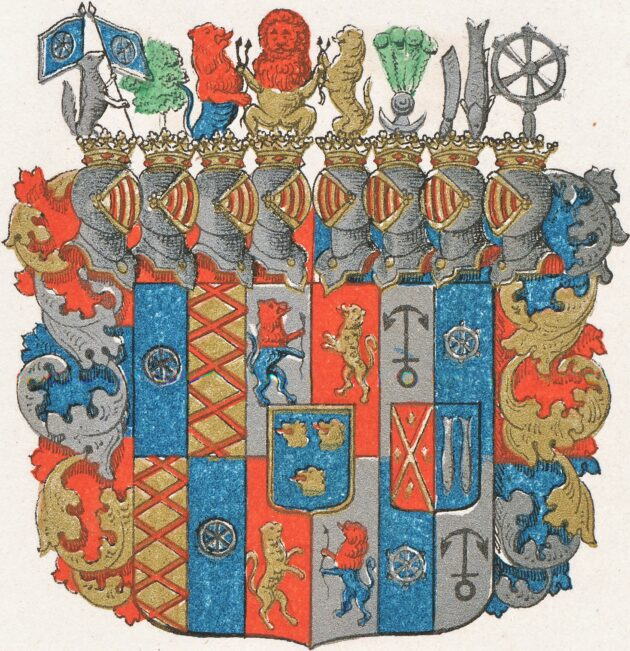
The comital coat of arms of the Lewenhaupt family.

By birth, he was a member of the Lewenhaupt family as the son of Claes Axel August Lewenhaupt (1854–1932) and Louise Carolina Lewenhaupt (1856–1933), daughter of Adam Casimir Lewenhaupt (1820–1895). He married three times. First on 13 August 1933 with Signe Wilhelmina Lindgren (1888–1945), daughter of Karl Johan Lewenhaupt (born c. 1823–1883). A year after her death, he remarried on 3 March 1946 with Martha Elvira Crafoord (1903–1951), daughter of Knut Georg Eugen Georgsson Crafoord (1866–1945). After her death, he remarried again on 24 June 1953 with Christina Elisabeth Wilhelmina Dyrssen (nicknamed "Stina"; 1991–1969), daughter of Valdemar Christian Dyrssen (1852–1931). She died only eight months before he did.

== Honours ==
=== National ===
- Sweden: Knight of the Order of the Polar Star (1929)
- Sweden: Knight 1st Class of the Order of Vasa (1920)
- Sweden: Commander 2nd Class of the Order of Vasa (6 June 1942)

=== Foreign ===
- Russia: Knight 3rd Class of the Order of Saint Stanislaus (prior to 1915)
- Denmark: Knight of the Order of the Dannebrog (prior to 1915)
- Finland: Recipient of the Order of the Cross of Liberty, 3rd Class (between 1915 and 1921)
- Finland: Recipient of the Order of the Cross of Liberty, 2nd Class (between 1915 and 1921)
- Norway: Knight 1st Class of the Order of Saint Olav (between 1915 and 1921)
- Belgium: Commander of the Order of Leopold II (between 1925 and 1931)
- Finland: Commander of the Order of the White Rose of Finland (between 1942 and 1945)
