= Grand Ducal Highness =

Style of address and reference

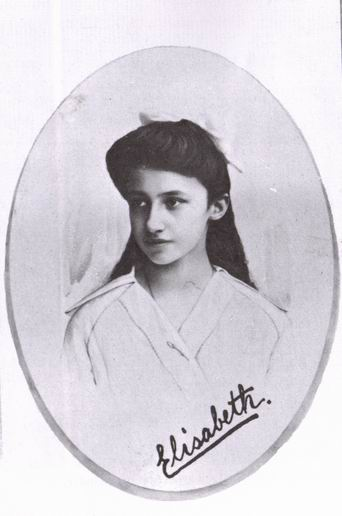
Her Grand Ducal Highness Elisabeth Marie Wilhelmine de Luxembourg, c. 1910s

His or Her Grand Ducal Highness (abbreviation: HGDH) is a style of address used by the non-reigning members of some German ruling families headed by a Grand Duke. No currently reigning family employs the style, although it was used most recently by the younger sisters of the late Grand Duchess Charlotte of Luxembourg. Since Grand Duchess Charlotte's marriage to Prince Felix of Bourbon-Parma, all of their male-line descendants have used the style Royal Highness, which he bore.

A reigning grand duke, his heir apparent, and their spouses would use the style of Royal Highness. The male line descendants of a reigning grand duke, other than the heir, would use the style Grand Ducal Highness. This practice was followed by the ruling families of Luxembourg, Hesse and by Rhine, and Baden. Other grand ducal families had either ceased to reign as grand dukes by the time this system developed following the 1815 Congress of Vienna or accorded only the style of "Highness" to cadet (Mecklenburg-Schwerin, Mecklenburg-Strelitz, Oldenburg, Saxe-Weimar). At present, the style is used only by the former ruling family of Baden, as the Hessian grand ducal family has become extinct.

Russian grand dukes and grand duchesses were the children or grandchildren of an Emperor of Russia and used the style Imperial Highness. The Grand Dukes of Tuscany used the style Royal Highness for themselves but it is not clear what style other members of the family would have used. By the time the system of different classes of Highness came into regular use for the relatives of rulers (in the eighteenth century), the Tuscan grand dukes were also members of the House of Austria. As such, they had the title of Archduke and used the style Imperial and Royal Highness.

In most of Europe, the style of Grand Ducal Highness was of lower rank than Imperial Highness and Royal Highness but higher than Highness and Serene Highness. If a woman with the rank of Royal Highness married a man with the rank Grand Ducal Highness, the woman would usually retain her pre-marital style. Also, if a woman with the rank of Grand Ducal Highness married a man with the rank of Serene Highness, she would keep her pre-marital style. However, if a woman bearing the style Grand Ducal Highness married a man bearing the style of Royal Highness or Imperial Highness she would, being consistent with the established tradition of conferring styles, assume her husband's style of Imperial Highness or Royal Highness. Similarly, if a woman bearing a lower (or no) title married a man bearing the style of Royal Highness or Highness, she would assume her husband's style. Cadets of grand ducal families who bore only the style of Highness were not, ipso facto, deemed of lesser rank than cadets of grand ducal families entitled to the style of Grand Ducal Highness.
