= Most Serene Republic =

Title attached to a number of European states through history

Most Serene Republic (Latin: Serenissima Respublica; Italian: Serenissima Repubblica; Polish: Najjaśniejsza Rzeczpospolita) is a title attached to a number of European states through history. By custom, the appellation "Most Serene" is an indicator of sovereignty (see also Serene Highness or Most Serene Highness for a sovereign prince). When used in the past, the title "Most Serene Republic" emphasized the sovereignty of the republic.

== Historical states ==
- The Most Serene Republic of Venice (Venetian: Serenìsima Repùblega de Venexia; Italian: Serenissima Repubblica di Venezia), a city-state that existed from 697 to 1797 based in the city of Venice with continuously controlled territory along the eastern Adriatic and Greece at its strongest period. The phrase La Serenissima ("The Most Serene") was also popularly used as a specific reference to the Venetian government or state authorities.
- The Most Serene Republic of Genoa (Ligurian: Serenìscima Repùbrica de Zêna; Italian: Serenissima Repubblica di Genova), an independent state based in Liguria on the northwestern Italian coast from c. 1100 to 1805. After using the plain title of "Republic" for a long time, the honorific "Most Serene" was added after the election of the first Doge of Genoa (1339). Even so, to distinguish their government from its ancient rival to the east, the Genoese rarely used the "Most Serene" designation, opting more frequently for the appellation "Superb Republic" (Italian: La Superba Repubblica), a nickname allegedly coined by Petrarch in 1358.
- The Most Serene Republic of Lucca (Italian: Serenissima Repubblica di Lucca), a city-state that existed from 1119 to 1799 based in the city of Lucca, in northern Tuscany, Italy. Lucca was the third largest Italian city state (after Venice and Genoa) with a republican constitution (comune) to remain independent over the centuries.
- Polish–Lithuanian Commonwealth (the Most Serene Commonwealth of Both Nations; Polish: Najjaśniejsza Rzeczpospolita Obojga Narodów; Latin: Serenissima Res Publica Utriusque Nationis), an elective monarchy in Central and Eastern Europe, existing from 1569 until 1795.

== Modern states ==
Currently, no country officially calls itself a "Most Serene Republic". Only two modern independent nations are still sometimes referred to by this style: San Marino, officially "the Republic of San Marino" (Italian: Repubblica di San Marino); and Poland, officially "the Republic of Poland" (Polish: Rzeczpospolita Polska), it is also at times called "the Most Serene Republic of Poland" (Polish: Najjaśniejsza Rzeczpospolita).

== See also ==
- Serene Highness
