= Hochgeboren =

Hochgeboren (German: [ˈhoːχɡəˌboːɐ̯n̩], lit. "high-born"; Latin: illustrissimus) is a form of address for the titled members of the German and Austrian nobility, ranking just below the sovereign and mediatised dynasties.

The actual address is "Euer" Hochgeboren. It is the proper form of address for counts (Grafen) that are neither heirs to mediatised families of the Holy Roman Empire (counts of the Holy Roman Empire or Reichsgrafen) nor families who have been bequeathed higher predicate by the Emperor. By courtesy, barons (Freiherr) belonging to old houses of the Uradel are also addressed in the same way.

The correct term for immediate counts (Reichsgrafen) is Erlaucht ("Illustrious Highness"), while the proper form of address for princes (Fürsten) and dukes (Herzöge) is Durchlaucht ("Serene Highness").

In the Netherlands, Hooggeboren ("High-born") is used to address Dukes, Margraves, Counts or Viscounts. In Belgium, Hooggeboren is used in Dutch and Messire ("Sir") in French.

== Lower form of address ==
The title should not be confused with (Euer) Hochwohlgeboren, which ranks lower, and is the correct form of address for German barons (Freiherren) and knights (Ritter); or (Euer) Wohlgeboren, which ranks lower than Hochwohlgeboren, and is the address for a Vogt ("reeve") or Büttel (bailiff).
