= Russian forms of addressing =

The system of Russian forms of addressing is used in Russian languages to indicate relative social status and the degree of respect between speakers. Typical language for this includes using certain parts of a person's full name, name suffixes, and honorific plural, as well as various titles and ranks.

== Linguistic instruments ==
=== T–V distinction ===
The most important, grammaticalized distinction is between plain (T) and honorific (V) form, the latter being expressed through honorific second person plural, reflected both in personal pronouns and verb declension. Historically, the verb (and some other words in the sentence) used to be accompanied by slovoyers (enclitic '-съ' (Note: The term "slovoyers" comes from the archaic way of spelling of words syllable-by-syllable and letter-by-letter, where every letter was named by the "letter name", followed by the pronunciation of the syllable. In this case, "slovo+yer+s", "slovo" is the name of the letter "с", "yer" is for the letter "ъ", and together they are pronounced as s.) added to one or several words of a phrase) and analytic verb form "изволить("express your will to") + infinitive (in a polite form if exists)". For example, "Не изволите ли Вы откушать рыбки?" [Would you like to have some fish?]

Both of these gradually fell out of general use. They are stll used in stylizations of an archaic speech, either in portrayals of old times or for a comic effect.

The choice between T and V forms is influenced by a number of factors, such as relative age and position, relationship between the speaker and the addressee, as well the general formality of the situation.

Generally, T-form is reserved to informal communication between friends and family members. Depending on the corporate culture, it may also be used between colleagues of the same age. Sometimes T-form is used unilaterally to address one's inferiors, e.g. by a boss addressing employees or by a teacher addressing students, or by an elder addressing junior.

V-form is used in all formal circumstances, to address adult strangers, elders, and superiors, or just to express respect and politeness (where a plain form is expected, however, using an honorific one unironically can sound uptight and distant). It is characterized by using the second person plural pronoun (often capitalized in writing to distinguish from numerical plural) and second person plural verb forms in all moods. Hortative mood has special polite form ending with –те (-te): пойдёмте (paydyomte) instead of пойдём (paydyom).

=== Appellations ===
==== Name ====
Modern East Slavic names are tripartite, consisting of family name, given name, and patronymic. Each of these components can be used alone or in different combinations; additionally, most given names have suppletively derived short form, which can be further suffixed to produce a number of diminutives conveying different emotional meaning and applicable in different contexts.

==== Other appellations ====
Much like other languages, in East Slavic one can address a person by words other than name or nickname, which can be divided into polite (e.g. господин (gospodin), “sir”), vernacular (e.g. братан (bratan), “bro”) and codified (such as military ranks and styles of office). Some of them may serve as titles, prefixing a person's name.

Styles in Russian Empire

From the time of Peter the Great, forms of address in the Russian Empire became well-codified, determined by a person's title of honor, as well as military or civil rank (see Table of Ranks) and ecclesiastical order. Religious clerical status was considered most important, followed by title, and then by civil/military rank, e.g. a commoner with the rank of Privy Councilor would be styled His Excellency, a prince of the same rank would be His Highness, while the same prince serving as an archbishop would be referred as His High Eminence. All of these styles are now obsolete and are only used in historical context.

Modern Styles of Office

Unlike English and many other languages, addressing a person by their office is highly uncommon outside of a protocol context (e.g. even during an official meeting it is very uncommon for to personally address a chairman as “Mr. Chairman”). On the other hand, military or paramilitary rank is commonly used, either as a title before one's name, or by itself, usually preceded by the title товарищ (comrade), e.g. лейтенант Петров (lieutenant Petrov), or товарищ лейтенант (lieutenant, sir; literally “comrade lieutenant”).

Common titles and appellations

During the Soviet era, the word товарищ (comrade) served as a universal form of address. Later it fell out of use due to its sexlessness and political connotations, while pre-Soviet styles seemed either archaic or too pompous (with the possible exception of the Ukrainian language, where the old honorific пан (pan) seems to be successfully revived). Eventually, such words as девушка (lady), молодой человек (young man), and even мужчина (man) and женщина (woman) have been adopted as default forms of addressing strangers, which may seem awkward or even rude to a foreigner.

Below is the list of common East Slavic titles given in Russian Cyrillic spelling and English transcription. Note that some of them can be only used alone, while others can become prefixes before names or other appellations.

Polite titles
Title	Trasliteration	Prefix	Translation	Use
милостивый государь милостивая государыня	Milostivy Gosudar (m); Milostivaya Gosudarynya (f)	no	Kind Sir/Madam	Used mostly in letters; fell out of usage
сударь сударыня	Sudar (m); Sudarynya (f)	no	Sir, madam	Once common, now considered archaic
товарищ	Tovarishch (unisex)	yes	comrade	Ubiquitous in Soviet times; now limited to Army and Communist Party
господин госпожа	gospodin (m) gospozha (f)	yes	Mister, Miss	most commonly used as prefix before surname
девушка молодой человек	dyevushka (f) molodoy chelovyek (m)	no	young lady young man	commonly used towards strangers
мужчина женщина	muzhchina (m) zhenschina (f)	no	man woman	used towards strangers
гражданин гражданка	grazhdanin (m) grazhdanka (f)	yes	citizen	used by state officials
отец, батюшка матушка	otets, batyushka (m) matushka (f)	yes	father mother	used to address clergy
брат сестра	brat (m) sestra (f)	yes	brother sister	used between monks and nuns.

Vernacular forms of address
Title	Trasliteration	Translation	Used towards
брат сестра	brat (m) sestra (f)	brother sister	Informal greeting towards one's sibling or close acquaintance; also used between monks and nuns.
братан, браток, братишка, братуха, братюня, брателло сеструха	bratan, bratok, bratishka, bratukha, bratyunya, bratello (m) sestrukha (f)	brother sister	Informal greeting towards one's sibling; also used to address a close friend.
мужик	muzhik (m)	man, boor	anybody too old to be пацан, but not old enough to be отец
пацан	patsan (m)	lad, boy	teenagers; also used between young men.
мальчик	malchik (m)	boy	anybody too young to be пацан
чувак чувиха	chuvak (m) chuvikha (f)	dude	mostly limited to certain subcultures, or to translate English word "dude"
отец матушка	otets (m) matushka (f)	father mother	a person old enough to be speaker's parent; also used to address priests, monks or nuns.
батя, батяня, папаша мать, мамаша	batya, batyanya, papasha (m) mat’, mamasha (f)	father mother	a person old enough to be speaker's parent.
дед, дедушка бабушка, бабка	dyed, dyedushka (m) babushka, babka (f)	grandfather grandmother	senior person
дядя, дяденька, дядюшка тётя, тётенька, тётушка	dyadya, dyadenka, dyadyushka (m) tyotya, tyotenka, tyotushka (f)	uncle aunt	common way for children to address adults; can be used as prefix before a given name, e.g. тётя Наташа (auntie Natasha)
дорогой дорогая	dorogoy (m) dorogaya (f)	dear	spouses (most common); children or close relatives (affectionate); customers (often used by merchants from Caucasus)
приятель, дружок, друг	priyatel, druzhok, drug (m)	friend	manual workers, especially migrants
народ братва	narod bratva	people brothers	used as collective form of address

=== Forms of address ===
By using different parts of a person's name in different forms, combined with T- or V-addressing, with or without titles and honorifics, one can produce at least 20 forms of address, all of which are fairly common, but used in different circumstances, as explained below:

Full name + Patronymic + Surname

Highly formal, used in documents or official setting. Surname-first order is considered bureaucratic, and name-first order more organic

Example:

Кузнецов Иван Петрович, согласны ли Вы взять в жёны Смирнову Марию Ивановну?
Kuznetsov Ivan Petrovich, do you agree to take Smirnova Mary Ivanovna to be your wife

English equivalent:

Ivan Kuznetsov, do you agree to take Mary Smirnova to be your wife?

Full name + Patronymic

General polite form of addressing, comparable to English Mr./Ms. + Surname

Example:

[to Ivan Petrovich Kuznetsov]: Мы согласны с Вашим предложением, Иван Петрович
We agree to your (pl.) offer, Ivan Petrovich

English equivalent:

We agree to your offer, Mr. Kuznetsov

Title + Surname

Feature of bureaucratic speech used in certain official contexts

Example

Гражданин Сидоров, Вы арестованы!
Citizen Sidorov, you are under arrest!

English equivalent:

Mr. Smith, you are under arrest

NB: the above three forms sound unnatural with T-form of address, but may be used ironically or sarcastically

Appellation only

T-form: Used to informally address strangers in certain situations

Example A

Мужик, смотри, куда прёшь!
Hey man (brute), watch where you are going

English equivalent:

Watch your step, man!

V-form: Used to address strangers politely

Example

Мужчина, вы куда?!
Man, where are you (pl.) [going] to?

English equivalent:

Where are you going, mister?

Title + Given name

Common feature of baby-talk with тётя (tyotya) and дядя (dyadya) titles and either full or short form of given name, T and V forms both acceptable; also used towards and between clergy with such titles as отец (otets, "father"), брат (brat, "brother"). Marginal examples of other usage exist, e.g. a renowned revolutionary Theodor Sergeyev used a nickname “Comrade Artyom” (Artyom being a male given name).

Example A:

[a child to a family friend Ivan]: Дядя Ваня, ты ещё приедешь?
Uncle Vanya (short form of male given name Ivan), will you (sg.) come (sg.) again?

English equivalent:

Will you come again, uncle Ivan?

Example B:

[exempt from a satirical poem about Soviet bureaucrats] Товарищ Надя, // К празднику прибавка
Comrade Nadya (short form of female given name Nadezhda), [I’ve got] a pay rise on account of a [state] holiday

Example C:

Исповедуйте меня, отец Василий!
Hear (pl.) my confession, father Basily

Military rank

Regulations of most military and paramilitary organizations require their members to address each other in V-from; subordinates shall address commanders as товарищ (tovarisch, "comrade) + military rank, while higher-ups address subordinates by military rank and surname.

Example

[colonel to sgt. Sidorov] Сержант Сидоров, ко мне!
Sergeant Sidorov, front and center!
[sgt. Sidorov to colonel] По вашему приказанию прибыл, товарищ полковник!
Reporting for duty [lit. arrived at your (pl.) request], comrade colonel!

Military men sometimes use same forms of address, albeit in singular, in friendly conversation

Example

Сержант, дай сигарету
Give (sing.) me a cigarette, Sarge

Surname only

May be used as a rather impolite way to address one's subordinates, pupils, students, etc. Especially rude when used with T-form. Often used by military men while a higher-up addresses a subordinate.

Example A (T-form)

Cидоров, выходи к доске
Sidorov, come (sing.) to the blackboard

Example B (V-form)

Сидоров, почему Вы не на рабочем месте?
Sidorov, why are you (pl.) away from your workplace?

Full given name only

May be used in V-form between colleagues of the same age. This form became used more often recently to mimic the corporate culture of Western companies, but is not very natural, as one would normally use either имя-отчество (imya-otchestvo) — name & patronimic — or short name

Example

Иван, передайте мне документы
Ivan, give (pl.) me the documents

Short name only

T-form: Default way of informally addressing acquaintances, colleagues, friends etc. Generally considered impolite when used towards people older than oneself (except close family members, though in Ukraine it is common to address one's parents with V-form)

Example

Ваня, ты куда?
Vanya, where are you (sing.) [going] to?

V-form: Polite way to address one's juniors and subordinates, or distantly known acquaintances, in moderately formal context

Example

[Ivan's boss to Ivan] Ваня, почему Вы не рабочем месте?
Vanya, why are you (pl.) away from your workplace?

Affectionate diminutive

T-form: Demonstrates care and affection, though may be considered baby-talk. Commonly used towards children, between lovers and intimate friends, though generally not between male friends

Example

[Ivan's girlfriend to Ivan] Ванечка, не уходи!
Vanechka, don’t leave (sing.)

V-form: May be used same way as short name + plural, especially to address one's juniors or people of the opposite sex. In Russian classics, it is commonly depicted to be used by aristocrats, who remained polite even with intimate friends.

Example

[Ivan’s female boss to Ivan] Ванечка, почему Вы не на рабочем месте?
Vanechka, why are you (pl.) away from your workplace?

NB: when a man addresses a young woman by this form, especially if the speaker is young too, it may be associated with a sexual desire and the stereotype of an "attractive female employee", who is "expected" to have sex with her boss or male customer.

Vernacular diminutive

Only used with T-form, expressing familiar, highly informal attitude. May be used by elders within a family or close friends, rude otherwise

Example

[Ivan's father to Ivan] Ванька, иди матери помоги
Vanka, go help your mother

Slang diminutive Expresses informal, brotherly attitude. May be used between male friends

Example

[Ivan's friend to Ivan] Ванёк, наливай!
Fill the glasses, Vanyok!

Patronymic only

Same as slang diminutive, but used mostly within older generations and not limited to males. In this particular case, some patronymics assume vernacular form with the suffixes –ych/vna- rather than –ovich/ovna-, e.g. Ivanovich becomes Ivanych. Sometimes an even more informal patronymic may be derived by using person's father's short name as a base, e.g. Kolyanych instead of Nikolaich (Kolya being short form of Nikolay)

Example

[Mary Ivanovna] Петрович, наливай!
Fill the glasses, Petrovich!
[Ivan Petrovich] Уже налито, Ивановна!
They’re full already, Ivanovna!
