= Kumar (title) =

Title of nobility

Kumar is a title mainly found in India, Bangladesh and Nepal denoting prince, referring to sons of a Raja, Rana, Babu or Thakur. It is synonymous to the Rajput title Kunwar. The south Indian version of the title is Kumara. The female version is Kumari. When there are more than one, the heirs are referred by their order in precedence i.e. First Kumar of Blank, Second Kumar of Blank & c.

== Notable people ==
- Kunwar Nau Nihal Singh (1821-1840), ruler of the Punjab region of the Indian subcontinent
- Kumar Aiyappan Pillai of Nagercoil
- Kunwar Natwar Singh
