= Fürst =

German princely title

Usual Crown (heraldry) of a Fürst in German-speaking countries

Fürst (German pronunciation: [ˈfʏʁst], female form Fürstin, plural Fürsten; from Old High German furisto, "the first", a translation of the Latin princeps) is a German word for a ruler as well as a princely title. Fürsten were, starting in the Middle Ages, members of the highest nobility who ruled over states of the Holy Roman Empire and later its former territories, below the ruling Kaiser (emperor) or König (king).

== Fürst in comparison with Prince ==
A prince of the Holy Roman Empire was the sovereign ruler of an imperial estate that held imperial immediacy in the boundaries of the Holy Roman Empire. The territory ruled is referred to in German as a Fürstentum (principality), the family dynasty referred to as a Fürstenhaus (princely house), and the (non-reigning) descendants of a Fürst are titled and referred to in German as Prinz (prince) or Prinzessin (princess).

The English language uses the term "prince" for both concepts. Latin-based languages (French, Italian, Romanian, Spanish, Portuguese) also employ a single term, whereas Dutch (vorst) as well as the Scandinavian and some Slavic languages use separate terms similar to those used in German (see Knyaz for the latter).

== Use of the title in German ==
From the Middle Ages on, the German designation and title of Fürst referred to:

- rulers of the states that made up the Holy Roman Empire, below the ruling Kaiser (emperor) or König (king);
- members of the nobility above the rank of Graf (count) but below Herzog (duke);
- a ruler or monarch (in general).

The title Fürst (female form Fürstin, female plural Fürstinnen) is used for the heads of princely houses of German origin (in German a Fürstenhaus). From the Late Middle Ages, it referred to any vassal of the Holy Roman Emperor ruling over an immediate estate. Unless he also holds a higher title, such as grand duke or king, he will be known either by the formula "Fürst von + [geographic origin of the dynasty]", or by the formula "Fürst zu + [name of the ruled territory]". These forms can be combined, as in "...von und zu Liechtenstein".

The rank of the title-holder is not determined by the title itself, but by his degree of sovereignty, the rank of his suzerain, or the age of the princely family (note the terms Uradel, Briefadel, altfürstliche, neufürstliche; and see German nobility). The Fürst (Prince) ranked below the Herzog (Duke) in the Holy Roman Empire's hierarchy, but princes did not necessarily rank below dukes in non-German parts of Europe. However, some German dukes who did not rule over an immediate duchy did not outrank reigning princes (e.g. Dukes of Gottschee, a title held by the Princes of Auersperg. Gottschee was not an Imperial state but a territory under the Dukes of Carniola. However, Princes of Auersperg held imperial immediacy for their state of Tengen). Likewise, the style usually associated with the title of Fürst in post-medieval Europe, Durchlaucht (translated as "Serene Highness"), was considered inferior to Hoheit ("Highness") in Germany, though not in France.

The present-day rulers of the sovereign principality of Liechtenstein bear the title of Fürst, and the title is also used in German when referring to princes of Monaco and co-princes of Andorra. The hereditary rulers of the one-time principalities of Bulgaria, Serbia, Montenegro, and Albania were also all referred to in German as Fürsten before they eventually assumed the title of "king" (König).

Fürsten crown used in heraldry, borne above the coat of arms to indicate a principality ruled. The Fürsten crown, sometimes placed together with a mantle, is not always found on a Fürstenhaus (princely house) coat of arms; these adornments were not part of formal armorial protocols, but simply heraldic grace.

Mediatised Fürsten headpiece used in heraldry.

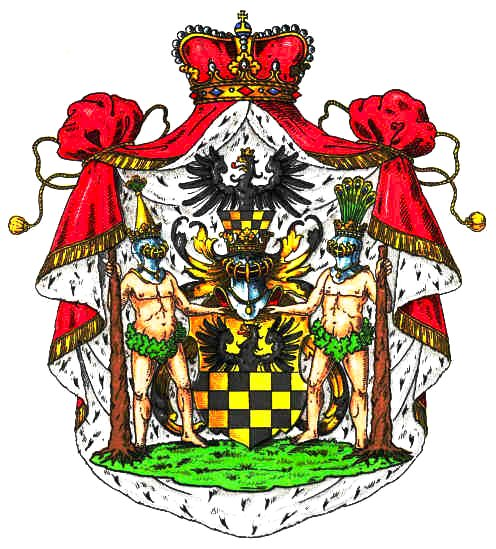
Fürst zu Putbus, arms with a mantle and Fürsten crown.

Fürst von Liechtenstein, arms with a mediatised Fürsten headpiece.

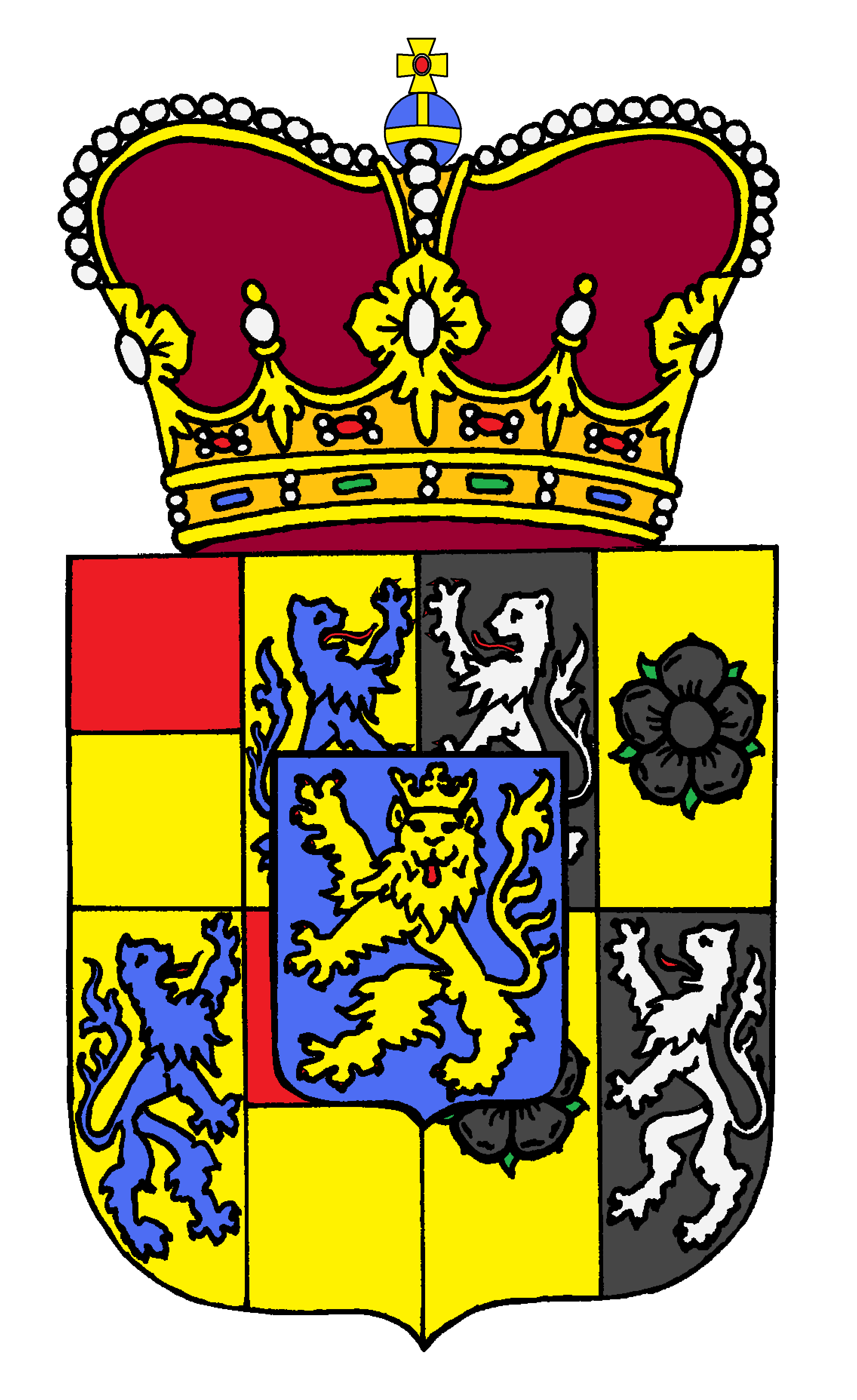
Fürst von Schwarzburg, arms with a Fürsten crown.

== Other uses in German ==
Fürst is used more generally in German to refer to any ruler, such as a king, a reigning duke, or a prince in the broad sense (compare Niccolò Machiavelli's Il Principe). Before the 12th century, counts were also included in this group, in accordance with its usage in the Holy Roman Empire, and in some historical or ceremonial contexts, the term Fürst can extend to any lord.

The descendants of a Fürst, when that title has not been restricted by patent or custom to male primogeniture, are distinguished from the head of the family by use of the title Prinz (prince, from Latin: princeps; female: Prinzessin).

A nobleman whose family is non-dynastic, i.e. has never reigned or been mediatised, may also be made a Fürst by a sovereign, in which case the grantee and his heirs are deemed titular or nominal princes, enjoying only honorary princely title without commensurate rank. In families thus elevated to princely title (usually as a reward for military or political services) in or after the 18th century, the cadets often hold only the title of Graf (Count), such as in the families of the princes of Bismarck, Eulenberg, Hardenberg and La Rochefoucauld-Montbel. However, in a few cases, the title of Fürst is available to all male-line descendants of the original grantee (mostly descendants of dukes, for example, the families of Hohenberg, Urach, but also descendants of a simple Fürst, like Wrede).

== Derived titles ==
Several titles were derived from the term Fürst:

- Reichsfürst (Prince of the Empire) was a ruling Prince whose territory was part of the Holy Roman Empire. He was entitled to a vote, either individually (Virilstimmen) or as a member of a voting unit (Curiatstimmen), in the Imperial Diet (Reichstag). Reichsfürst was also used generically for any ruler who cast his vote in either of the Reichstag's two upper chambers, the Electoral College (Kurfürstenrat) or the College of Princes (Fürstenrat): their specific title might be king, grand duke, duke, margrave, landgrave, count palatine (Pfalzgraf), burgrave, Imperial prince (Reichsfürst) or Imperial count (Reichsgraf). Usually included in this group were the reichsständische Personalisten, Imperial princes and counts whose small territories did not meet the Fürstenrat's criteria for voting membership as an Imperial estate (Reichsstand), but whose family's right to vote therein was recognised by the Emperor. Officially, a Prince of the Church (Kirchenfürst) who voted in the Electoral or Princely College, along with a handful of titular princes (nobles granted an honorary but hereditary title of prince by an Emperor who, however, were not reichsständisch, lacking a vote in the Fürstenrat) might also be referred to as Reichsfürsten.
- Kirchenfürst (Prince of the Church) was a hierarch who held an ecclesiastic fief and Imperial princely rank, such as prince-bishops, prince-abbots, or Grand Masters of a Christian military order. All Cardinals are deemed to be Princes of the Church and considered to be equal to royal princes by the Church.
- Landesfürst (Prince of the Land) is a princely head of state, i.e. not just a titular prince. A Land was a geopolitical entity with (feudal) statehood, whether fully independent or not. The term is sometimes translated, as in states bound together only in a personal union (e.g., the Electorate of Hanover and the United Kingdom of Great Britain and Ireland) whose joint ruler reigned as a Landesfürst in each of the realms under different titles and constitutions. Thus, for example, the Habsburg emperors held a different regnal style in each of their Kronland ('crown land') realms.
- Kurfürst (Prince-Elector) was a Prince of the Holy Roman Empire with a vote in the election of the Holy Roman Emperor, as designated by the Golden Bull of 1356 or elevated to that status subsequently. Originally, only seven princes possessed that right, of whom four were secular and three ecclesiastic. This prerogative conferred on its holders rank inferior only to that of the Emperor, regardless of the specific title attached to each Elector's principality. Kur (earlier spelled Chur) is derived from küren, "to choose". Properly an office of the Empire rather than a hereditary title, during the long de facto tenure of the Imperial throne held by the House of Habsburg, the Electorates were less distinguished from other Imperial princes by their right to choose an emperor than by the right to transmit the fief associated with the office to a single heir by primogeniture, originally unknown in Germany, rather than to divide lands among descendants in multiple appanages, allowing preservation of each Elector's territorial integrity and power.
- Großfürst (Grand Prince) was a rare title in German-speaking lands, and was used primarily to translate titles borne by rulers in and outside the Holy Roman Empire (e.g., Russia, Tuscany). In 1765, Empress Maria Theresa proclaimed the Hungarian province of Transylvania to be a "Grand Principality" (Großfürstentum Siebenbürgen), whereafter it became one of the titles of the Emperor of Austria in 1804.
- Fürstprimas (Prince primate) referred to the head of the member states of the Napoleonic Confederation of the Rhine established in 1806, then held by the Archbishop-Elector of Mainz, Karl Theodor Anton Maria von Dalberg. Today, it is a rarely used episcopal title: upon the elevation of the Esztergom (Gran) archbishop, Christian August of Saxe-Zeitz, to a Prince of the Holy Roman Empire in 1714, his successors have borne the title of Prince primate (Hungarian: hercegprímás) up to today. The Archbishops of Salzburg still hold the title of Primas Germaniae, though their diocese is located in Austria.

== Origins and cognates ==
The word Fürst designates the head (the “first”) of a ruling house, or the head of a branch of such a house.

The term “first” originates from ancient Germanic times, when the “first"” was the leader in battle.

Various cognates of the word Fürst exist in other European languages (see extensive list under Prince), sometimes only used for a princely ruler. A derivative of the Latin princeps (a Republican title in Roman law, which never formally recognized a monarchic style for the executive head of state but nominally maintained the Consuls as collegial—typically dual—chief magistrates) is used for a genealogical prince in some languages (e.g., in Dutch and West Frisian, where a ruler is usually called vorst and foarst, respectively), but a prince of the blood is always styled prins. In Icelandic, fursti is a ruler, and a prince of the blood is prins (in these languages, no capital letters are used for writing titles, unless they occur as the first word of a sentence), while in other languages, only a princeps-derived word is used for both (e.g., English uses prince for both). In all cases, the original (German or otherwise) term may also be used.

== Similar Concepts in other Cultures ==
An East-Asian parallel to the concept of "ruling prince" would be the term 王 (pronounced wáng in Mandarin, wong^{4} in Cantonese, ō in Japanese, wang in Korean, and vương in Vietnamese), which is a word that commonly refers to Korean and non-East-Asian "kings", but here instead it means non-imperial nominal monarchs (who would go by 皇帝 ("emperor") instead) in ancient China, and therefore is frequently translated to "prince", especially for those who became rulers well after to the first adoption of the title 皇帝 by Qin Shi Huang. On the other hand, the son of a monarch would go by different titles, such as 皇子 ("imperial son") or 王子 ("royal son").
