= Hochwohlgeboren =

Hochwohlgeboren (German: [ˌhoːxˌvoːlɡəˈboːɐ̯n̩], lit. "High Well-born"; Latin: magnificus) is an honorific and manner of address for members of the nobility in some parts of Europe.

== German ==
This form of address originally had connections with the ability of a Freiherr (Baron) to bequeath a family coat of arms and to hold landed property as allodial instead of a fief. The actual address is Euer Hochwohlgeboren ("Your High Well-born") and is the correct form of address not only German Freiherren but also Ritter and Edle.

The title should not be confused with (Euer) Hochgeboren. This title ranks higher than Hochwohlgeboren and is the style of mediate Grafen (mediate Counts; immediate counts or Reichsgrafen are entitled to the address Erlaucht) and those Freiherren descending from the mediæval Uradel.

Another honorific title was (Euer) Wohlgeboren which ranked lower than Hochwohlgeboren and was claimed by Bourgeois notables.

In the 19th century it became customary to address academic and other civil honoraries by this title, e.g., a number of letters to Sigmund Freud are addressed to "Hochwohlgeboren Prof. Dr. Sigmund Freud".

It is commonly abbreviated in correspondence as: “I.I.H.H.” for married couples “I.H.” (= Ihre Hochwohlgeboren) for women. “S.H.” (= Seine Hochwohlgeboren) for men.

== Swedish ==
In Sweden Högvälboren (High Well-born) is used to address barons and counts, Välboren (Well-born) is used to address untitled nobles.

== Dutch ==
In The Netherlands Hoogwelgeboren (High Well-born) is used to address a Baron, a Knight or a Jonkheer. Hooggeboren (High-born) is used to address Dukes, Margraves, Counts or Viscounts.

== Russian ==
In Imperial Russia, civil, military and court officials in the 6th to 8th grades according to the Table of Ranks were addressed with a style similar in meaning (Ваше высокоблагородие). Similarly the style (Euer) Wohlgeboren (Ваше благородие) was applied to officials in the 9th to 14th grades, while (Euer) Hochgeboren (Ваше высокородие) was enjoyed by officials in the 5th grade. As such the honorific address was also implied by membership in some grades of the Russian dynastic orders of chivalry.

== Hungarian ==
In Hungarian the equivalent word was "nagyságos" and literally comes from this term in Latin "magnificus".
