= Ducal Serene Highness =

His/Her Ducal Serene Highness (abbreviation: HDSH) was a style used by members of certain ducal families, such as those of Duke of Nassau, Braganza, and the Ernestine duchies (until 1844). This treatment is superior to Serene Highness because it takes the adjective ducal (relative at duke).

The Saxon duchies of Meiningen, Gotha and Altenburg dropped the style in favor of Highness in 1844.
