= Serene Highness =

Style of address

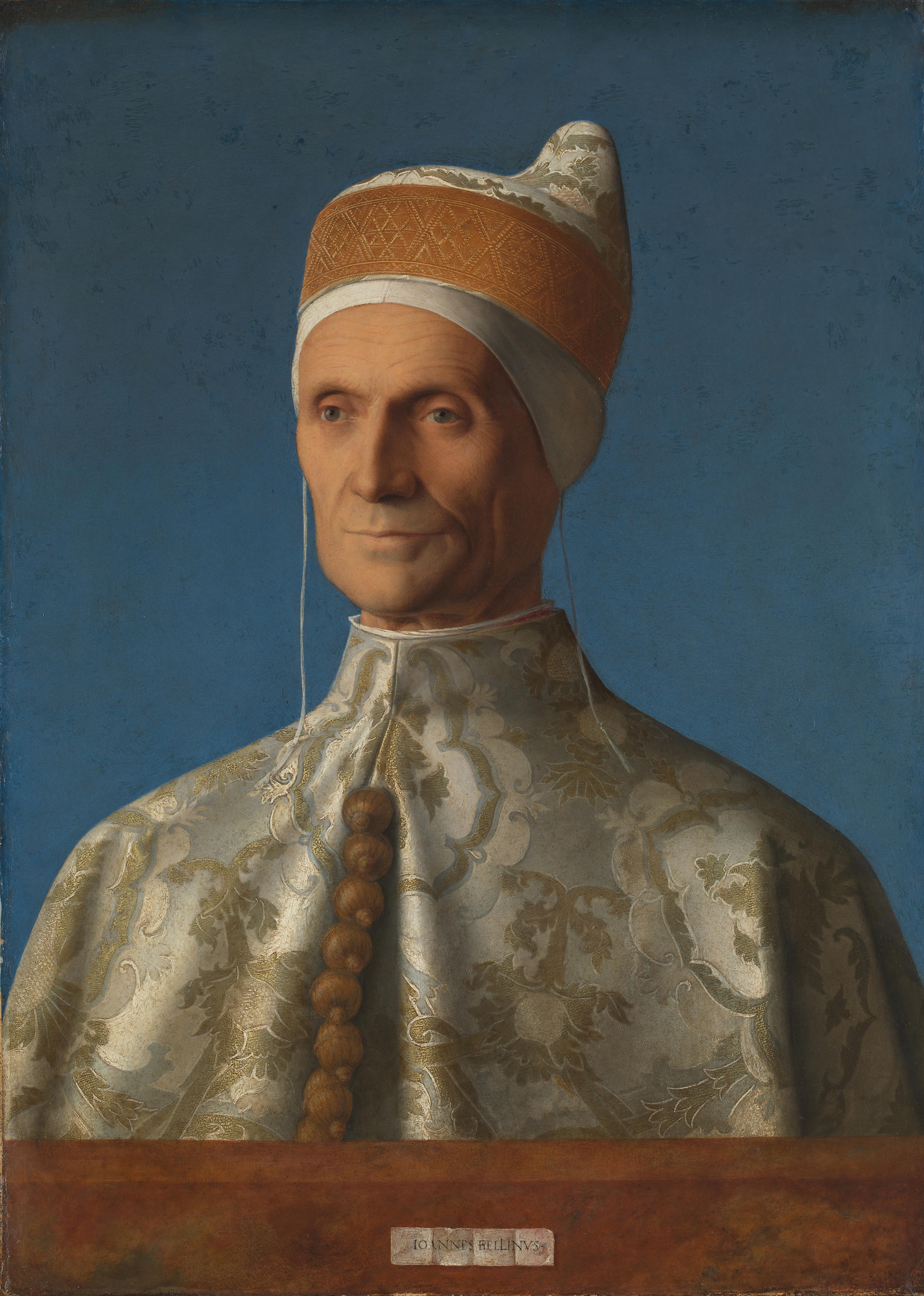
Doge Leonardo Loredan, portrait by Giovanni Bellini, 1501, National Gallery, London

His/Her Serene Highness (abbreviation: HSH, second person address: Your Serene Highness; French: Altesse Sérénissime) is a style used today by the reigning families of Liechtenstein and Monaco. Until 1918, it was also associated with the princely titles of members of some German ruling and mediatised dynasties and with a few princely but non-ruling families. It was also the form of address used for cadet members of the dynasties of France, Italy, Russia and Ernestine Saxony, under their monarchies. Additionally, the treatment was granted for some, but not all, princely yet non-reigning families of Bohemia, Hungary, Italy, Poland, Romania and Russia by emperors or popes. In a handful of rare cases, it was employed by non-royal rulers in viceregal or even republican contexts.

== Belgium ==
The following titleholders or families are authorised by the Crown to use the style Serene Highness (French: Altesse Sérénissime, Dutch: Doorluchtige Hoogheid)

- Dukes and princes of Arenberg
- Dukes of Beaufort-Spontin
- Dukes and princes of Croÿ
- Princes of Habsburg-Lorraine (archducal cadets resident in Belgium)
- Princes of Lobkowicz (resident in Belgium)
- Dukes and princes of Looz-Corswarem
- Princes of Stolberg-Stolberg
- Prince of Waterloo

In the lodges of the Grand Orient of Belgium, the latter's Grandmaster is styled (fr) Sérénissime Grand Maître, (nl) Doorluchtige Grootmeester.

== Francophone dominions ==
There is some evidence that in pre-Revolutionary France, unlike Germany, one entitled to be addressed as Serene Highness was considered to outrank someone who was addressed as merely Highness. Those members of the royal family who were not children or grandchildren of a king, i.e., the princes du sang, were entitled to be addressed as "Most Serene Highness" (Son Altesse Sérénissime, abbreviated S.A.S.). The simple style of "Highness" (altesse) was claimed by the princes étrangers and the princes légitimés. In fact, these formal styles were seldom employed in conversation, since the princes du sang used unique styles (e.g. Mademoiselle, Monsieur le Prince), while the ducal peers, led by the proud Duc de Saint-Simon, avoided conceding the altesse to the princes étrangers and bâtards royaux, prompting nobles of lesser rank to do likewise.

== German-speaking lands ==
The current, legal usage of the style in the German-speaking countries is confined to the Princely Family of Liechtenstein, the entirety of which bears the treatment.

The German term is Durchlaucht, a translation of the Latin (su)perillustris. This is usually translated into English as Serene Highness, however, it would be more literal to translate it as superior to, above, beyond or greater than illustrious, as it is an augmentation of Erlaucht ("Illustrious Highness"), which was accorded to immediate counts (Reichsgrafen) of the Holy Roman Empire and by mediatised counts of the German Confederation and the German Empire. The 1911 edition of the Encyclopædia Britannica wryly observes that a perfectly logical English version might be "Your Transparency".

In 1375, Emperor Charles IV bestowed the nobiliary style Durchlauchtig upon the seven Prince-electors designated by the Golden Bull of 1356. As from 1664, Emperor Leopold I vested all Imperial Princes with the title, it became so common that the Electors like the Archdukes of Austria began to use the superlative address Durchlauchtigst. In the German Empire, the style of Serene Highness was usually held by princes of lower rank than those who were entitled to Highness (exceptions were the Wettin cadets of the Ernestine duchies), Grand Ducal Highness, Royal Highness, and Imperial Highness. Therefore, if a woman entitled to the treatment of Royal Highness married a man who was addressed only as Serene Highness, the woman usually retained her pre-marital style.

In 1905, Emperor Franz Joseph I of Austria granted the style of Durchlaucht to members of virtually every family which had held the title of prince in the former Holy Roman Empire, even if the family had never exercised sovereignty.

In the German and Austrian empires of the 19th and 20th centuries, the style Serene Highness was also officially borne by:

- Cadet branches of the sovereign Ernestine dukes (i.e., Saxe-Altenburg, Saxe-Meiningen, Saxe-Coburg and Gotha);
- Reigning Fürsten of the small German realms which survived the collapse of the Holy Roman Empire;
  - Hohenzollern (yielded sovereignty to Hohenzollern kinsman, the King of Prussia, in 1848)
  - Lippe
  - Reuss
  - Schaumburg-Lippe
  - Schwarzburg
  - Waldeck and Pyrmont
- Mediatised princes (e.g., Fürstenberg, Hohenlohe, Leiningen, Thurn und Taxis) and dukes (e.g., Ratibor), and perhaps their family members;
- Morganatic princes, descended from reigning dynasties;
- Other non-reigning princes of the German nobility, but not (always) their cadets (e.g., Bismarck, Carolath-Beuthen, Pless, Wrede).

By tradition, Durchlaucht is still attributed to the princely dynasties which were sovereign until 1917 or had been mediatised under the Austro-Hungarian Empire and German Confederation in 1815, although the usage has been unofficial since 1918.

N.B. The highest form of durchlauchtig (adjective) was allerdurchlauchtigst (absolutely most serene), which was reserved only to the Emperor in his style of address: Allerdurchlauchtigster Großmächtigster Allergnädigster Kaiser und Herr

== Hungary ==
Before 1947, the style "His/Her Serene Highness"' (Őfőméltósága, literally: "His/Her High Dignity") was in use in Hungary. Peers with the title of prince were entitled to it, and between 1920 and 1944, the regent, Miklós Horthy, was styled as His Serene Highness the Regent of the Kingdom of Hungary (Őfőméltósága, a Magyar Királyság kormányzója).

== Italy ==
In the Republic of Venice (697–1797), also called "the Most Serene Republic", "la Serenìsima Repùblega" in Venetian ("la Serenissima Repubblica" in Italian), the Doge was known as Serenissimus ("Most Serene") as was the Duke of Mantua.

Children of the Savoy kings and crown princes of Italy were entitled to the treatment of Royal Highness, but more remote male-line descendants were Serene Highnesses by right (although often the style of Royal Highness was granted to them ad personam, e.g., the Dukes of Aosta or the Dukes of Genoa).

The mediatised House of Thurn and Taxis, entitled to the Serene Highness treatment in the German Empire, has a non-dynastic cadet branch, the Dukes di Castel Duino, which obtained naturalization in Italy in 1923. When incorporated into the Italian nobility, their use of the Serene Highness style was authorised by the Crown.

== Liechtenstein ==
See #German-speaking lands

== Mexico ==
During the Mexican War of Independence, Miguel Hidalgo y Costilla was addressed as Su Alteza Serenísima while he headed the provisional insurgent government in Guadalajara in late 1810 and early 1811. Contemporary accounts record that local authorities and supporters gave him the style upon his entry into the city on 26 November 1810; he accepted it, although in his own official decrees he continued to style himself primarily as Generalísimo. In 1813 the Congress of Anáhuac decreed that José María Morelos should receive the same style. Morelos declined it and thereafter styled himself “Servant of the Nation” and Generalísimo. Agustín I, during the First Mexican Empire, granted the style to several members of his family. From 1853 to 1855 Antonio López de Santa Anna, as president, assumed the official style of Most Serene Highness by decree, a treatment unique for non-monarchical head of state in Mexico.

== Monaco ==
The reigning Prince of Monaco, Albert II, is accorded the treatment Serene Highness. His wife, children and younger sister, Princess Stéphanie, also enjoy the style Serene Highness. His elder sister, Princess Caroline, was also styled Her Serene Highness prior to her 1999 marriage, but is styled Royal Highness since then, even during the period when she was officially "The Hereditary Princess of Monaco" as heiress presumptive to the throne. A particularly well known holder of this style of address was Grace Kelly, who was titled, HSH Princess Grace of Monaco. In French, both male and female versions are Son Altesse Sérénissime (S.A.S.), which translates, literally, as "His/Her Most Serene Highness".

== Poland ==
In the First Republic of Poland (1569–1795), also called "the Most Serene Republic of Poland" (Najjaśniejsza Rzeczpospolita Polska), His/Her Serene Reigning Majesty (SRM) was a style used by the reigning monarchs.

== Portugal ==
As the most powerful noble family in Portugal, the Dukes of Braganza had the official treatment of Serene Highness until 1640, when they mounted the Portuguese throne, thereby becoming entitled to the style of Royal Highness; however, the infantes not in direct line for the throne of Portugal were titled as "His/Her Highness, the Serene Infante(a)".

== Russia ==
After 1886, great-grandchildren of Russian emperors in the male line were Prince[ss] of Russia, and were to be granted the treatment of Highness, and Prince[ss] of Russia with the style of Serene Highness if more distantly descended from an emperor, and born from an equal marriage (as opposed to morganatic marriage). An exception was for each eldest son of senior imperial great-grandsons (in the patrilineal descent of each son of the emperor), who retained the higher style of Highness.

During the Russian Empire, noble principalities of Khimshiashvili and Palavandishvili, whose titles was recognized by the Romanov family (whose origins are Georgian, Armenian, Ancient Roman), also used the title "Serene Highness"

The Khimshiashvili family is descended from a lord titled Magister Equitum (Master of the Horse) who settled in Georgia during the Caucasus campaign of the great Roman commander Gnaeus Pompeius Magnus in 65 BC.

Strictly, the Russian term, Svetlost, was an honorific used in adjectival form (Светлейший: Svetleyshiy, Most Serene) to refer to members of a select few of Russia's princely families (e.g. "The Serene" Prince Anatoly Pavlovich Lieven or "The Serene" Prince Dmitri Vladimirovich Golitsyn). However, when translated into non-Slavic languages and used in reference to a member of the imperial Romanov family, it was usually rendered as Serene Highness.

== San Marino ==
San Marino is styled as the Most Serene Republic.

== Spain ==
In 1807, Manuel de Godoy, Prince de la Paz, was accorded the style of Most Serene Highness, a treatment unique in that country at the time. Previous to this grant the style was sometimes used by the Catholic Monarch Isabella and Ferdinand as well as by other houses known anciently as illustrious or serene. A majority of these ancient houses lost the style through prescription.

The honorific (Spanish: El Serenísimo Señor) is one of the styles of the infantes.

== Thailand ==
In Thailand, the title of Serene Highness is the westernized style of the Thai title of Mom Chao (His/Her Serene Highness Prince/Princess | Thai: หม่อมเจ้า), denoting the grandchild of a king through one of his princely sons. In present-day Thailand, there are very few Mom Chao left after the royal family discontinued the traditional practice of polygamous marriages, and in Thailand all royal titles and styles decrease one level every generation for those not of the immediate royal family. Therefore, the child of a Mom Chao would only have the aristocratic title of Mom Rajawongse, which would then decrease in the next generation to Mom Luang, which would then decrease further, similar to a British life peerage.

== United Kingdom ==
Queen Victoria elevated each of the princes who married her daughters to Royal Highness (except for Crown Prince Friedrich of Prussia, husband of Victoria, Princess Royal, who already possessed the HRH). This included, on 30 January 1884, HSH Prince Henry of Battenberg, husband of Princess Beatrice. That couple's children were granted the style of Highness by their British grandmother by letters patent 4 December 1886.

Several morganatic branches of reigning German dynasties took up residence in the United Kingdom in the 19th century, where their German princely titles and style of Serene Highness were recognized by the sovereign. Included in this group were Princess Edward of Saxe-Weimar, Princess Victor of Hohenlohe-Langenburg, the dukes and princes of Teck and the princes of Battenberg.

During World War I, King George V revoked recognition of the style Serene Highness, hitherto used by some relatives of the British royal family who used German princely titles but lived in Britain. George V's queen consort was born "Her Serene Highness Princess Mary of Teck", and Prince Philip's mother had been born "Her Serene Highness Princess Alice of Battenberg". The Tecks (descended from the royal House of Württemberg) and the Battenbergs (descended from the Grand Dukes of Hesse and by Rhine) were compensated with multiple peerages, viz. Marquess of Cambridge and Earl of Athlone for the former, and Marquess of Milford Haven and Marquess of Carisbrooke for the latter.

== See also ==
- Style (manner of address)
- Most Serene Republic
- SAS (novel series), named after Son Altesse Sérénissime, French version of the honorific.
