= Illustrious Highness =

Style of address

Illustration of an Erlauchtkrone

His/Her Illustrious Highness (abbreviation: H.Ill.H.) is the usual English-language translation of the German word Erlaucht, a style historically attributed to certain members of the European nobility. It is not a literal translation, as the German word for "Highness" is Hoheit, a higher style that appertained to sovereign dukes and some other royalty.

== Ancient ==
"Illustrious Highness" is used to translate the Middle High German word Erlaucht (German: erleuchtet) eventually borne by Imperial counts, similar to the later Durchlaucht ("Serene Highness") which was reserved for the Reichsfürsten (Princes of the Holy Roman Empire).

== Modern ==
From the early modern period, the style Erlaucht has been used by the members of those comital families (Reichsgrafen) who, like the Reichsfürsten, held the status of Imperial immediacy. They retained it even after the German Mediatisation of 1802/03, confirmed by the Bundesversammlung of the German Confederation in 1828.

The style was also adopted by the cadet members of some princely families like Colloredo-Mansfeld, Fugger, Khevenhüller, Dietrichstein, Sayn-Wittgenstein, Schönburg, Solms, Starhemberg, Stolberg, Waldburg or Waldeck-Pyrmont. Mediate comital families were entitled to the lower style, Hochgeboren.

Erlaucht is sometimes used to translate the Russian word Siyatelstvo (Сиятельство), a style used by members of some Russian princely families (also sometimes translated as Serene Highness). In Imperial Russia, the Russian princely counts hold the style of Illustriousness, often translated as "Illustrious Highness".
