= Imperial Highness =

Form of address

Imperial Highness is a form of address used for members of an imperial family. It denotes imperial – as opposed to royal – status to show that the holder in question is descended from an emperor rather than a king (compare His/Her Royal Highness). It is typically used to address a prince or princess who is the child of the emperor and/or empress, or their spouse. Used with possessive pronouns such as his, her, or their, the title is abbreviated accordingly as H.I.H. or T.I.H.

The first dynasty to use the style in Europe on the generic basis were the Romanovs in the eighteenth century; the archdukes and archduchess of the House of Habsburg were only styled as Royal Highness given the officially elective nature of the Holy Roman Empire.

With the establishment of the Austrian Empire in 1804, the style of members of its imperial family changed to Imperial Highness. Following the Austro-Hungarian compromise with its creation of two intertwined but distinct states, the Austrian Empire and the Kingdom of Hungary, the style was changed to Imperial and Royal Highness to reflect the double role; however, the colloquialism of omitting "and Royal" was acceptable even for the most formal occasions.

Today, the style has mainly fallen from use with the exception of the Imperial House of Japan (Japanese: 殿下, Hepburn: denka). In the past, the style has been applied to the more senior members of imperial dynasties, including the French, Turkish, Russian, Brazil, and Ethiopian imperial houses, among many others. Archdukes of Austria from the Habsburg dynasty traditionally hold the style of Imperial and Royal Highness (German: Kaiserliche und königliche Hoheit), with the "Royal" signifying their status as Princes of Hungary. These styles have been abrogated but are often given out of courtesy. Some members of the royal family of Belgium descending from the Habsburgs do hold it as an official style (the "and Royal" might here possibly be read as referring as well to Belgium). Members of the British royal family, theoretically, as the imperial family of British India, could have used the title, but did not.
