= Precedence among European monarchies =

Disputes about ranking between medieval European kingdoms

The order of precedence among European monarchies was a much-contested theme of European history, until it lost its salience following the Congress of Vienna in 1815.

== Origins ==
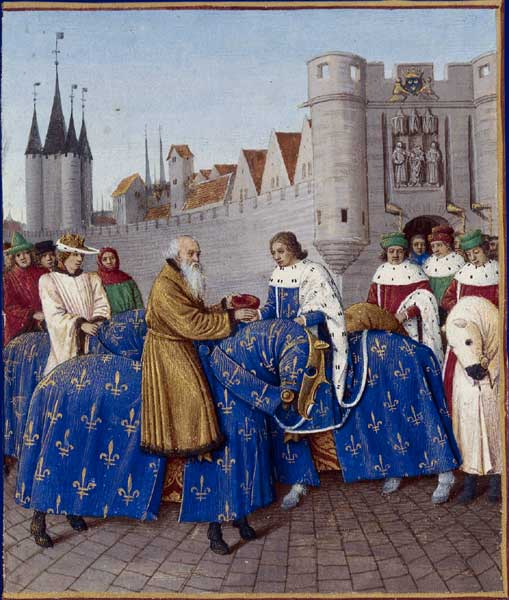
Meeting of King Charles V of France and Emperor Charles IV outside the Porte du Temple in Paris in January 1378. The depicted ceremonial places both monarchs on equal footing, but only the French king gets to ride a white horse. Illuminated manuscript of the Grandes Chroniques de France by Jean Fouquet, ca.1455–1460

Following the fall of the Western Roman Empire, many of the new polities acknowledged the lingering primacy of the (Eastern) Roman Empire, or were too isolated for matters of international relations to have much salience. In the late 8th century, the Frankish kingdom, which on Christmas Day 800 became the Carolingian Empire, unified all Christendom west of the Byzantine Empire, with few exceptions that were all geographically remote and could not contest its primacy (the Kingdom of Asturias, Brittany and the various kingdoms of the British Isles). The initial tension between the Carolingians and Byzantines over succession of the Roman Empire, dubbed by historians the problem of two emperors, largely faded away in the near-absence of a land border between the two entities. By contrast, the issue of precedence among Western European monarchies became a contentious matter following the disintegration of the Carolingian Empire which started in the 9th century.

The disputes about rank were initially concentrated between the two most immediate heirs of the Empire, namely the Holy Roman Emperor and King of France. In the 10th century, Carolingian kings of France sought Ottonian help against their Robertian rivals, thus placing themselves in an unequal relationship, as when Louis IV of France spent Easter in Aachen at the court of Otto I in 947, or when Lothair of France made peace with Emperor Otto II at Margut in 980. In the 11th century, by contrast, occasional meetings between the French king and the Emperor took place on a basis of equality of status, on or near the river Meuse that symbolized the border between the two realms: between Robert II of France and Emperor Henry II in 1006 and again (in Mouzon) in 1023; between Henry I of France and Emperor Conrad II in nearby Deville in 1033; and between Henry I of France and King then Emperor Henry III in Ivois, the base of the Lotharingian Counts of Chiny, in 1043, 1048 and 1056.

In the early 14th century, the French monarchy's legal officials formalized this equality by claiming that the king has in his kingdom the same prerogatives as the emperor in the Empire (Rex est imperator in regno suo). In 1377–1378, the visit to Paris of Emperor Charles IV and his son Wenceslaus, as recounted in the Grandes Chroniques de France, was strictly choreographed to highlight the emperor's equality of rank with his nephew King Charles V of France. The Grandes Chroniques specifically comment on the color of the horses used for the procession into Paris: since riding a white horse denoted sovereignty over the land, that attribute was reserved to the French king, while the Emperor rode a dark horse. Furthermore, the Emperor's horse was clothed with French colors.

Conflicts of precedence were intermittent and flared up especially at international meetings such as the Council of Constance in 1415 and Council of Basel in 1431.

== Papal authority ==
Before the Reformation, all western European powers acknowledged the supreme status of the Papacy and of its envoys, notwithstanding the longstanding conflict between popes and emperors that culminated in the Investiture Controversy. For Catholic rulers, the Pope and his court in Rome were the ultimate arbiters of precedence and rank. The legacy survives to this day with the senior rank of the Nuncio in the diplomatic corps of many countries.

By contrast, the pope's primacy was contested by non-Catholic powers, including the Byzantine emperor especially at the Council of Ferrara in 1438, where the Emperor and Patriarch of Constantinople were unwilling to cede the place of honor to the Pope. Similarly, Protestant sovereigns from the 16th century onwards only viewed the pope as an ecclesiastical authority and secular ruler (of the Papal States). The demise of the Pope's role was visible after Frederick I of Prussia's assumption of royal dignity in 1701, which was recognized by most European powers, including Catholic ones, even as Pope Clement XI refused to do so.

=== The 1500s: Julius II's ceremonial ranking ===
A formal order of precedence was enunciated around 1504 by Pope Julius II, based on a combination of historical considerations (the older the realm, the higher the rank) and power positions. It built on earlier practices, particularly the senior status granted to the Holy Roman Emperor and the next-highest rank granted to the Kingdom of France as "eldest daughter of the Church". The list was first recorded in 1505 in the diary of his master of ceremonies, Paris de Grassis, below with added titles (in parentheses) that were granted over time by the Papacy, as well as the holders of the titles or the situation of the same in 1505:

- The Pope (Julius II)
- The Holy Roman Emperor (Defensor Ecclesiae)

- and/or the King of the Romans (Maximilian I)

- The King of France (Rex Christianissimus since the 15th century) (Louis XII)
- The King (or Queen) of Spain (Rex Catholicissimus after 1493) (Joanna)

- The King of Aragon (Ferdinand II & V) in union with Castile to form Spain

- The King (or Queen) of Portugal (Rex Fidelissimus after 1748) (Manuel I)
- The King (or Queen) of England (Fidei Defensor after 1521) (Henry VII)
- The King (or Queen) of Sicily (In personal union with Spain)
- The King (or Queen) of Scotland (Fidei Defensor after 1507) (James IV)
- The King (or Queen) of Hungary (Apostolic Majesty in medieval times and again after 1758) (Vladislaus II)
- The King (or Queen) of Navarre (Catherine)
- The King (or Queen) of Cyprus; after 1489 that title was claimed by the Duke of Savoy, whose long quest for royal rank eventually succeeded with the Peace of Utrecht
- The King (or Queen) of Bohemia (In personal union with Hungary)
- The King (or Queen) of Poland (Rex Orthodoxus briefly after 1661) (Alexander)
- The King (or Queen) of Denmark, whose personal rule in 1505 extended over all Nordic regions under the Kalmar Union (John)

- King of Sweden (in personal union with Denmark)

- The Doge of Venice (Leonardo Loredan)
- The Duke (or Duchess) of Brittany (Anne)
- The Duke of Burgundy (In personal union with Spain)
- The Elector Palatine (Philip)
- The Elector of Saxony (Frederick III)
- The Elector of Brandenburg (Joachim I Nestor)
- The Archduke of Austria (Title holder elected as Holy Roman Emperor)
- The Duke of Savoy (Charles III)
- The Duke of Florence (Piero Soderini)
- The Duke of Milan (In personal union with France)
- The Duke of Bavaria (Albert IV)
- The Duke of Lorraine (René II)
- The Duke (or Duchess) of Bourbon (Suzanne)
- The Duke of Orléans (Merged into the French Crown titles)
- The Doge of Genoa (Dogeship vacant. Genoa occupied by France)
- The Duke of Ferrara (Ercole I d'Este or his son Alfonso I d'Este)

When one monarch held several crowns in personal union, he or she would hold the higher rank among them. For example in 1504, Ferdinand II of Aragon had recently become King of Sicily (in 1501), and Vladislaus II of Hungary was also King of Bohemia. Despite being listed as having greater precedence than certain duchies, Genoa, Venice and Florence were in reality republics. Attempts to change the Papal order of precedence took place in numerous occasions. Spain, which had been favoured by Pope Alexander VI and that throughout the 16th century built an immense colonial empire in the Americas (which in the geopolitical context of the time made the Spanish monarch one of the de facto most powerful people in Europe and on the planet), aspired to have the same status as France during the Council of Trent (1545–1563). However, Pope Pius IV rejected Spanish demands. England also aspired to have the same status as Portugal. This was also refused, especially as a result of the English reformation. The Portuguese had also built a colonial empire outside of Europe that made the country a superpower at the time, while the English in the 16th century were still limited to Europe (they will only start to build their colonial empire in the 17th century).

== Conflicts of precedence in the early modern era ==
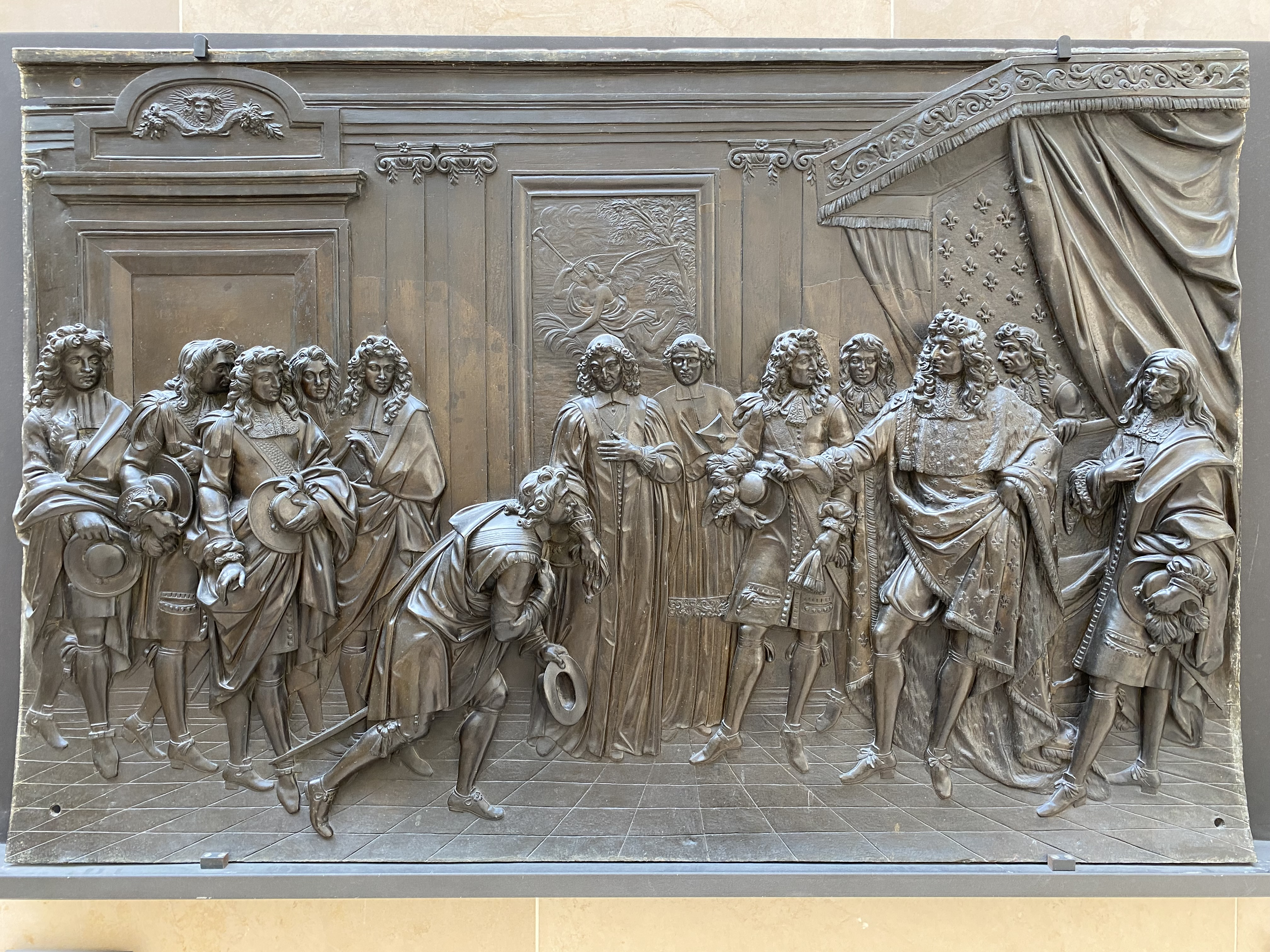
Spain acknowledges France's precedence on 24 March 1662, by Martin Desjardins (1686), now at the Louvre

Julius's ceremonial list may have temporarily resolved some squabbles, but did not satisfy those monarchs who felt entitled to a higher position than it granted them. The disputes were made visible by proceedings of the Papal court in Rome, where all the significant monarchies had ambassadors, and of occasional councils, as well as in third locations on occasion. The solution of acknowledging equality of all royal crowns as a matter of principle only emerged gradually, even though an early case was the mutual recognition of equal rank between France and England in the mid-16th century.

The Kings of France, who reigned over Europe's most populous country with absolute power, were continuously frustrated by the primacy of the Emperors of the fragmented and decentralized Holy Roman Empire (virtually a feudal remnant of the Middle Ages, to the point where Voltaire centuries later famously declared it was "neither holy, nor Roman, nor an empire"), but were never able to question it, even though they did object to the fact that the King of the Romans would similarly outrank them. The quest for higher status partly explains why the French kings sought the Imperial crown at the 1519 imperial election and again at the 1658 imperial election. As it happened, both attempts were unsuccessful.

Similarly, the monarchs of Spain, who had become rulers of vast, rich and populous colonial possessions in the Americas, were malcontent with the seniority of those of France, following the end of the reign of Charles V who had outranked his French counterpart as Holy Roman Emperor. The Council of Trent, which had started under Charles V, was the inevitable theater of the rivalry. In 1560, Philip II of Spain suggested a joint representation there of himself and his uncle Ferdinand I, Holy Roman Emperor, so that his envoy would outrank that of France. In 1562–1564 and again in 1583, Philip appears to have contemplated an imperial title over the Indies for similar reasons, but eventually gave up.

Spain contested French seniority for many generations: to avoid incidents, the respective ambassadors of the two countries often had to make sure they would not find themselves in the same place at the same time. Eventually France built its own colonial empire, however it governed only small Caribbean islands and sparsely populated regions of North America. In 1661, a contest for position between the French and Spanish ambassadors in a ceremonial procession in London led to a number of deaths. The Count of Fuentes, Spanish ambassador in Paris, had to apologize to Louis XIV the next year, an event that was deemed significant enough to be memorialized a generation later in a bronze relief by sculptor Martin Desjardins on the Louis XIV Victory Monument on Place des Victoires in Paris together with major military victories. The issue was alleviated after the House of Bourbon secured the Spanish crown in the 18th century, and eventually settled with the Pacte de Famille of 1761.

Other conflicts of precedence lasted for most of the early modern era, notably between England and Spain; England and Portugal; Denmark and Sweden; Sweden and Poland; Poland and Hungary; Poland and Portugal. The generally held view that older monarchies deserved higher rank led to pseudo-historical claims of ancient origins, such as, for Sweden, Johannes Magnus's Historia de omnibus Gothorum Sueonumque regibus. The power politics of the day also played a role, for example when France accepted Sweden's claim of status equality at the Peace of Westphalia.

In addition, the emergence as European powers of the Ottoman Empire in the 15th and 16th centuries, and of the Tsardom of Russia in the 17th and 18th centuries, created additional conflicts of precedence. After the fall of Constantinople in 1453, the Ottoman Sultans viewed themselves as rightful successors of the Roman Empire and would not concede superiority of rank to any European monarch. The European powers grudgingly accepted the Sultan's imperial rank above European kings, but were unwilling to countenance a higher position for the Sultan than that of the Holy Roman Emperor. In the Treaty of Constantinople (1533), at the height of Ottoman power, the European accepted the subterfuge of referring to Charles V only as King of Spain. At the Peace of Zsitvatorok (1606), the Ottomans for the first time acknowledged equal rank for the Holy Roman Emperor, in a manner reminiscent of the Carolingian and Holy Roman Empire's prior parity of status with the Byzantine Empire.

As for Russia, its monarch's title of Tsar was not viewed (outside of Russia itself) as denoting Imperial rank until the 18th century, after its victories in the Great Northern War transformed it into a fully-fledged European power. The Tsar's imperial dignity was recognized in 1721 by the Kingdom of Prussia and the Dutch Republic; 1723 by Sweden and Saxony; 1741 by the Ottoman Empire; 1742 by Great Britain; 1745 by the Holy Roman Empire, France and Spain; and 1764 by Poland.

In 1760, the Portuguese statesman and diplomat Sebastião José de Carvalho e Melo, 1st Marquis of Pombal, attempted to definitely resolve the issue of diplomatic precedence by denying any permanent seniority to envoys others than those of the Pope and Holy Roman Emperor. This was predictably rejected by the French minister in Lisbon. The formula eventually adopted at the Congress of Vienna would be similar.

In 1785, there were plans to trade the Wittelsbach-held Duchy of Bavaria with the Austrian Netherlands and upgrading the former with the title King of Burgundy. The plan met resistance from France and the Fürstenbund who feared that it would disturb the imperial constitution leading to its failure.

== Congress of Vienna and later practices ==
The issue of precedence among ambassadors was settled at the Congress of Vienna, an outcome that was arguably enabled by the dissolution of the Holy Roman Empire in 1806 and the humbling of France following the Battle of Leipzig in 1813. A "Regulation concerning the precedence of Diplomatic Agents", inspired by Talleyrand, was signed on 19 March 1815 and included as the last (17th) annex in the Congress's Final Act. The rank of an ambassador was based on length of tenure, and specifically determined by the date of official notification of their arrival in a capital, except for papal envoys who retained senior status.

This convention remained in usage until 1961, when it was superseded by the Vienna Convention on Diplomatic Relations. The latter still allows the host state to grant seniority of precedence to the nuncio over others of ambassadorial rank accredited to the same country, and may grant the deanship of that country's diplomatic corps to the nuncio regardless of seniority.

The Congress of Vienna also considered settling the issue of precedence among monarchs themselves, but could not find consensus. Nowadays, precedence in meetings of heads of state is defined by length of tenure.

== See also ==
- Order of precedence
- List of heads of state by diplomatic precedence
- Westphalian system
- Diplomatic rank
- Res publica Christiana
