= List of treaty titles for monarchs =

Several monarchs had titles used in diplomatic settings which were not part of their official national royal style, but which signified their nationality. The Treaty of Paris (1763) or the Treaty of Westphalia (1648) are two examples of the use of these "treaty titles." These titles were usually awarded by the Pope.

== Treaty titles ==
=== August Majesty ===
This title was awarded to the Holy Roman Emperor and used in treaties such as the Treaty of Westphalia.

=== Apostolic Majesty ===
This title was awarded to the Kings of Hungary. The title was first used around 1000 A.D. when Pope Sylvester II conferred upon Stephen I of Hungary for his efforts in converting the people of Hungary to Christianity. In 1758, it was renewed by Pope Clement XIII for use by Empress Maria Theresa of the House of Habsburg and her descendants. Later, it was used by Franz Joseph I of Austria and has not been used since the dissolution of Austria-Hungary.

=== (Most) Catholic Majesty ===
This title, often written as Rex Catholicissimus, was awarded to the King of Spain and used in treaties such as the Treaty of Paris. The title was first used in 1493 by Pope Alexander VI in the papal bull Inter caetera.

=== (Most) Christian Majesty ===
This title was awarded to the King of France and used in treaties such as the Treaty of Paris and the Treaty of Westphalia.

=== (Most) Faithful Majesty ===
This title was awarded to the King of Portugal and used in treaties such as the Treaty of Paris. The title was in use from 1748 to 1910.

=== Orthodox Majesty ===
This title was awarded to the King of Poland John Casimir II by Pope Alexander VII in 1661 for the 1658 decree by the Polish Diet that banished all Socinians from Poland. The title was alternatively written as Rex Orthodoxus.

=== Prussian Majesty ===
This title was awarded to the King of Prussia.

=== Sicilian Majesty ===
This title was awarded to the King of the Two Sicilies.

=== Britannic Majesty ===
This title was awarded to the King of Great Britain, later the King of the United Kingdom, and used in treaties such as the Treaty of Paris.
