= Rameswaram (disambiguation) =

Rameswaram is a town in Tamil Nadu, India

Rameswaram may also refer to these places in India:

== Rameswaram, Tamil Nadu ==
- Ramanathaswamy Temple
- Rameswaram bridge
- Rameswaram Island
- Rameswaram taluk, a subdistrict of Tamil Nadu

== Andhra Pradesh ==
- Rameswaram, Kakinada district
- Rameswaram, Konaseema district
- Rameswaram, Kadapa district

== Other ==
- Rameswaram (film), a 2007 Indian film

== See also ==
- Rameshwari (disambiguation)
- Ramesuan (disambiguation)
