= Westphalian system =

Concept of the sovereignty of nation-states

The Westphalian system, also known as Westphalian sovereignty, is a principle in international law that each state has exclusive sovereignty over its territory. The principle developed in Europe after the Peace of Westphalia in 1648, based on the state theory of Jean Bodin and the natural law teachings of Hugo Grotius. It underlies the modern international system of sovereign states and is enshrined in the United Nations Charter, which states that "nothing ... shall authorize the United Nations to intervene in matters which are essentially within the domestic jurisdiction of any state."

According to the principle, every state, no matter how large or small, has an equal right to sovereignty. Political scientists have traced the concept to the eponymous peace treaties that ended the Thirty Years' War (1618–1648) and Eighty Years' War (1568–1648). The principle of non-interference was further developed in the 18th century. The Westphalian system reached its peak in the 19th and 20th centuries, but has faced recent challenges from advocates of humanitarian intervention.

== Principles and criticism ==
A series of treaties made up the Peace of Westphalia, which has been considered by political scientists to be the beginning of the modern international system, in which external powers should avoid interfering in another country's domestic affairs. The backdrop of this was the previously held idea that Europe was supposed to be under the umbrella of a single Christian protectorate or empire; governed spiritually by the Pope, and temporally by one rightful emperor, such as that of the Holy Roman Empire. The then-emerging Reformation had undermined this as Protestant-controlled states were less willing to respect the "supra authority" of both the Catholic Church and the Catholic Habsburg-led Emperor.

Recent scholarship has argued that the titular Westphalian treaties in 1648 actually had little to do with the principles with which they are often associated: sovereignty, non-intervention, and the legal equality of states. For example, Andreas Osiander writes that "the treaties confirm neither [France's or Sweden's] 'sovereignty' nor anybody else's; least of all do they contain anything about sovereignty as a principle." Political scientists like Hall Gardner have challenged the titular applicability of these historical treaties towards the political principle on such grounds as well. (Note: Reviewer Sarang Shidore summarizes Gardner's argument: Westphalian sovereignty, Gardner argues, is substantially a myth... Rather than a strict enshrining of the principle of noninterference, Westphalia legitimized "power sharing and joint sovereignty" by giving the new powers France and Sweden the right to interfere in the affairs of the German Protestant princes (p. 117).) Others, such as Christoph Kampann and Johannes Paulmann, argue that the 1648 treaties, in fact, limited the sovereignty of numerous states within the Holy Roman Empire and that the Westphalian treaties did not present a coherent new state-system, although they were part of an ongoing change. Yet others, often post-colonialist scholars, point out the limited relevance of the 1648 system to the histories and state systems in the non-Western world. Nonetheless, "Westphalian sovereignty" continues to be used as a shorthand for the basic legal principles underlying the modern state system. The applicability and relevance of these principles have been questioned since the mid-20th century onward from a variety of viewpoints. Much of the debate has turned on the ideas of internationalism and globalization, which some say conflicts with the doctrine of the two swords ideal of self-sovereignty.

== History ==
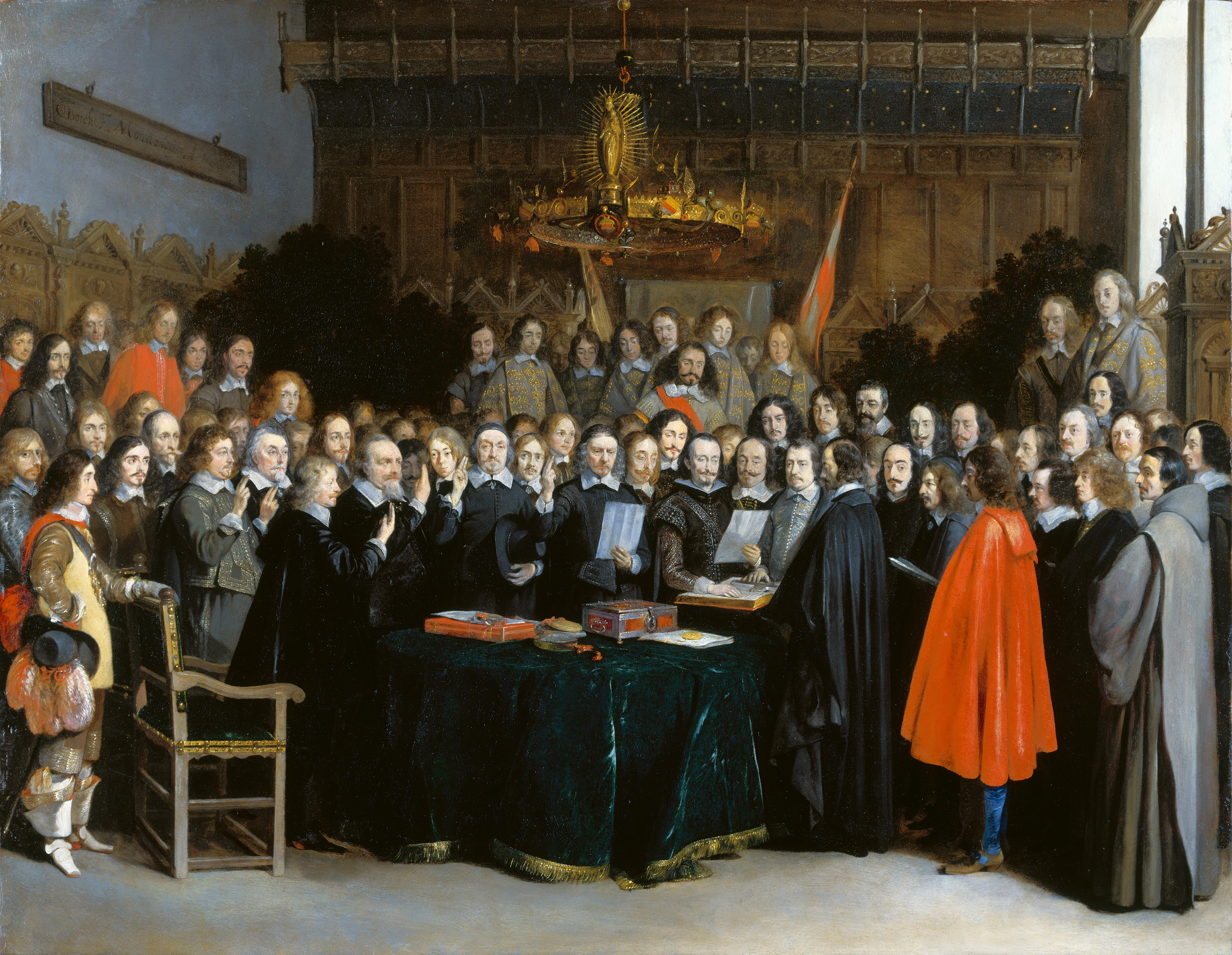
The ratification of the Treaty of Münster, part of the Peace of Westphalia that ended the Thirty Years' War

The origins of Westphalian sovereignty have been traced in the scholarly literature to the eponymous Peace of Westphalia (1648). The peace treaties put an end to the Thirty Years' War, a war of religion that devastated Germany and killed 30% of its population. Since neither the Catholics nor the Protestants had won a clear victory, the peace settlement established a status quo order in which states would refrain from interfering in each other's religious practices. Henry Kissinger wrote:

The Westphalian peace reflected a practical accommodation to reality, not a unique moral insight. It relied on a system of independent states refraining from interference in each other's domestic affairs and checking each other's ambitions through a general equilibrium of power. No single claim to truth or universal rule had prevailed in Europe's contests. Instead, each state was assigned the attribute of sovereign power over its territory. Each would acknowledge the domestic structures and religious vocations of its fellow states and refrain from challenging their existence.

The principle of non-interference in other countries' domestic affairs was laid out in the mid-18th century by Swiss jurist Emer de Vattel. States became the primary institutional agents in an interstate system of relations. The Peace of Westphalia is said to have ended attempts to impose supranational authority on European states. The "Westphalian" doctrine of states as independent agents was bolstered by the rise in 19th-century thoughts of "classical" nationalism, under which legitimate states were assumed to correspond to nations, defined as groups of people united by language and culture.

In the Westphalian system, cities are subsumed within states. Before the Westphalian system, cities were not necessarily seen as internal to states.

Before the Westphalian system, the closest geopolitical system was the "Chanyuan system" established in East Asia in 1005 through the Treaty of Chanyuan, which, like the Westphalian peace treaties, designated national borders between the states of the Song and Liao dynasties in 11th-century China. This system was thereafter copied and further developed in East Asia in the following centuries until the establishment of the pan-Eurasian Mongol Empire in the 13th century.

The Westphalian system reached its peak in the late 19th century. Although practical considerations still led powerful states to seek to influence the affairs of others, forcible intervention by one country in the domestic affairs of another was less frequent between 1850 and 1900 than in most previous and subsequent periods (i.e. Napoleonic, the Great War, the Second World War).

Chapter I of the United Nations Charter asserted a version of Westphalian sovereignty. Article 2, Clause 4 reads:

All Members shall refrain in their international relations from the threat or use of force against the territorial integrity or political independence of any state, or in any other manner inconsistent with the Purposes of the United Nations.

After the end of the Cold War, the United States and Western Europe began talking of a post-Westphalian order in which countries could intervene against other countries under the context of human rights abuses. Critics of the post-Westphalian policy have argued that such intervention would be and has been used to continue processes similar to standard Euro-American colonialism, and that the colonial powers always used ideas similar to "humanitarian intervention" to justify colonialism, slavery, and similar practices. China and Russia have used their United Nations Security Council veto power to block what they see as American attempts to violate the sovereignty of other nations, perceiving it as imperialistic expansion under the guise of humanitarian intervention.

== Challenges to Westphalia ==
The end of the Cold War saw increased international integration and, arguably, the erosion of Westphalian sovereignty, especially in the process of democracy promotion. Much of the literature was primarily concerned with criticizing realist models of international politics in which the notion of the state as a unitary agent is taken as axiomatic.

In 1998, at a Symposium on the Continuing Political Relevance of the Peace of Westphalia, NATO Secretary-General Javier Solana said that "humanity and democracy [were] two principles essentially irrelevant to the original Westphalian order" and levelled a criticism that "the Westphalian system had its limits. For one, the principle of sovereignty it relied on also produced the basis for rivalry, not community of states; exclusion, not integration."

In 1999, British Prime Minister Tony Blair gave a speech in Chicago where he "set out a new, post-Westphalian, 'doctrine of the international community.'" Blair argued that globalization had made the Westphalian approach anachronistic. Blair was later referred to by The Daily Telegraph as "the man who ushered in the post-Westphalian era". Others have also asserted that globalization has superseded the Westphalian system.

In 2000, Germany's Foreign Minister Joschka Fischer referred to the Peace of Westphalia in his Humboldt Speech, which argued that the system of European politics set up by Westphalia was obsolete: "The core of the concept of Europe after 1945 was and still is a rejection of the European balance-of-power principle and the hegemonic ambitions of individual states that had emerged following the Peace of Westphalia in 1648, a rejection which took the form of closer meshing of vital interests and the transfer of nation-state sovereign rights to supranational European institutions."

The European Union's concept of shared sovereignty is also somewhat contrary to historical views of Westphalian sovereignty, as it provides for external agents to influence and interfere in the internal affairs of its member countries. In a 2008 article, Phil Williams links the rise of terrorism and violent non-state actors (VNSAs), which pose a threat to the Westphalian sovereignty of the state, to globalization.

In turn, some legal scholars criticize the applicability of the Westphalian system to the governance of cyberspace. In particular, Lusine Vardanyan and Hovsep Kocharyan, legal scholars from Palacký University, have questioned in their scientific contribution: "[H]ow to ensure the functioning of the EU in cyberspace, which is considered to be 'limitless'? And in general, can the digital sovereignty of the EU be considered as a simple digitalization of Westphalian sovereignty, and digital space – as a new dimension of territory (along with land, water and air spaces)? The practice of international law shows that with the development of international relations, it is not the category of territory that changes, but rather its substantive aspect. we believe that it is not necessary to deny the importance of the territory as the legal basis for the exercise of sovereignty in cyberspace, but rather to rethink the content of this category in the digital world. This is especially important in conditions when the EU puts the issue of digital sovereignty as the basis of its digital policy on its political agenda. [...] However, unlike other categories of territory, cyberspace has a specific and multifaceted nature, which does not allow it to be viewed through the classical (Westphalian) understanding of the territory and the already existing principles for determining such a territory."

The same legal scholars argue: "Besides, cyberspace, unlike other categories of territory, is no longer exclusive as in the case of Westphalian sovereignty, since not only states, but also BigTech companies (such as Google, Facebook, etc.) turn cyberspace into their 'common' territory. For example, such BigTech companies create business products, use cookies and softwares to collect data and conduct surveillance of data subjects, while states themselves delegate control of their laws to such companies, implementing their digital policies through such BigTech companies. All these are clear examples of drawing digital borders in cyberspace, which brings to the fore new risks and challenges, that are not known to the traditional (Westphalian) understanding of sovereignty".

As a result, Vardanyan and Kocharyan argue that a "Digital Westphal" system is necessary to prevent digital conflicts and promote global digital cooperation.

=== Military intervention ===
Interventions such as in Cambodia by Vietnam (the Cambodian–Vietnamese War) or in Bangladesh (then a part of Pakistan) by India (the Bangladesh Liberation War and the Indo-Pakistani War of 1971) were seen by some as examples of humanitarian intervention, although their basis in international law is debatable. Other more recent interventions, and their attendant infringements of state sovereignty, also have prompted debates about their legality and motivations.

A new notion of contingent sovereignty seems to be emerging, but it has not yet reached the point of international legitimacy. Neoconservatism in particular has developed this line of thinking further, asserting that a lack of democracy may foreshadow future humanitarian crises, or that democracy itself constitutes a human right, and therefore states not respecting democratic principles open themselves up to just war by other countries. However, proponents of this theory have been accused of being concerned about democracy, human rights and humanitarian crises only in countries where American global dominance is challenged, while ignoring the same issues in other countries friendlier to the United States.

Further criticism of Westphalian sovereignty arises regarding allegedly failed states, of which Afghanistan (before the 2001 US-led invasion) has been often considered an example. By this view, it has been argued that no sovereignty exists and that international intervention is justified on humanitarian grounds and by the threats posed by failed states to neighboring countries and the world as a whole.

== Defenders of Westphalia ==
Although the Westphalian system developed in early modern Europe, its staunchest defenders can now be found in the non-Western world. CCP General Secretary Jiang Zemin and Russian President Vladimir Putin issued a joint statement in 2001 vowing to "counter attempts to undermine the fundamental norms of the international law with the help of concepts such as 'humanitarian intervention' and 'limited sovereignty'". China and Russia have used their United Nations Security Council veto power to block what they see as American violations of state sovereignty in Syria. Russia was left out of the original Westphalian system in 1648, but post-Soviet Russia has seen Westphalian sovereignty as a means to balance American power by encouraging a multipolar world order.

Some in the West also speak favourably of Westphalian sovereignty. American political scientist Stephen Walt urged U.S. President Donald Trump to return to Westphalian principles, calling it a "sensible course" for American foreign policy.

== See also ==
- International relations (1648–1814)
- Civic nationalism
- Monopoly on violence
- Plurinationalism
- Precedence among European monarchies
- Res publica Christiana
- Westfailure
