= Apostolic Majesty =

Styled title used by the Kings of Hungary

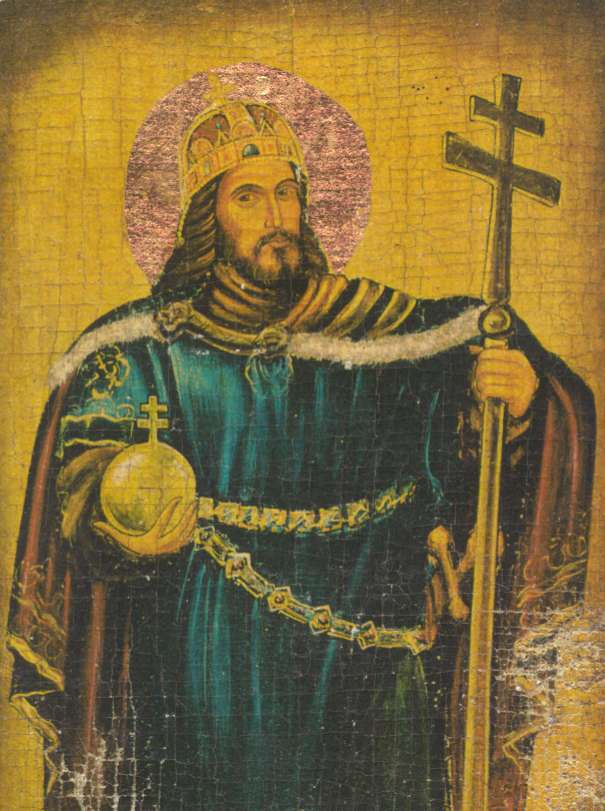
King Saint Stephen of Hungary

His (Royal) Apostolic Majesty was a styled title used by the Kings of Hungary, in the sense of being latter-day apostles of Christianity.

== First creation ==
The origin of this title dates from around 1000 A.D. when Pope Silvester II conferred it upon Saint Stephen I (975–1038), the first Christian king of Hungary in recognition of the king's promotion of the introduction of Christianity into Hungary and of his zeal in seeking the conversion of the heathen. According to tradition, Stephen also received the ecclesiastical title of "Apostolic Legate".

The Habsburg dynasty, after its members became Kings of Hungary from 1526, saw themselves as heirs of Saint Stephen (reigned c. 997–1038), inheritors of the title which they claimed had been bestowed by Pope Sylvester II.

Arduin or Hartvik (1097–1103), bishop of Győr, the biographer of St. Stephen, recounts that the pope hailed the king as a veritable "Apostle" of Christ, with reference to his holy labours in spreading the Catholic faith through Hungary. However the papal bull of Sylvester II, dated 27 March 1000, though it granted St. Stephen the crown and title of King, returned the kingdom he had offered to the Holy See and granted administrative authority over bishoprics and churches, nevertheless made no mention of this particular title, though granting "you and your successors, who shall have been legally elected and approved by the apostolic see, the right to have the cross borne before you as a sign of apostleship".

The Letter of Pope Sylvester II to Stephen of Hungary, 1000 AD. Sylvester, bishop, servant of the servants of God, to Stephen, king of the Hungarians, greeting and apostolic benediction. Your ambassadors, especially our dear brother, Astricus, bishop of Colocza, were received by us with the greater joy and accomplished their mission with the greater ease, because we had been divinely forewarned to expect an embassy from a nation still unknown to us.... Surely, according to the apostle: "It is not of him that willeth nor of him that runneth, but of God that showeth mercy" [Rom. 9:16]; and according to the testimony of Daniel: "He changeth the times and the seasons; he removeth kings and setteth up kings; he revealeth the deep and secret things; he knoweth what is in the darkness" [Dan. 2:21, 22]; for in him is that light which, as John teaches, "lighteth every man that cometh into the world" [John 1:9]. Therefore we first give thanks to God the Father, and to our Lord Jesus Christ, because he has found in our time another David, and has again raised up a man after his own heart to feed his people Israel, that is, the chosen nation of the Hungarians. Secondly, we praise you for your piety toward God and for your reverence for this apostolic see, over which, not by our own merits, but by the mercy of God, we now preside. Finally, we commend the liberality you have shown in offering to St. Peter yourself and your people and your kingdom and possessions by the same ambassadors and letters. For by this deed you have clearly demonstrated that you already are what you have asked us to declare you [i.e., a king]. But enough of this; it is not necessary to commend him whom God himself has commended and whose deeds openly proclaim to be worthy of all commendation. Now therefore, glorious son, by the authority of omnipotent God and of St. Peter, the prince of apostles, we freely grant, concede, and bestow with our apostolic benediction all that you have sought from us and from the apostolic see; namely, the royal crown and name, the creation of the metropolitanate of Gran, and of the other bishoprics. Moreover, we receive under the protection of the holy church the kingdom which you have surrendered to St. Peter, together with yourself and your people, the Hungarian nation; and we now give it back to you and to your heirs and successors to be held, possessed, ruled, and governed. And your heirs and successors, who shall have been legally elected by the nobles, shall duly offer obedience and reverence to us and to our successors in their own persons or by ambassadors, and shall confess themselves the subjects of the Roman church, who does not hold her subjects as slaves, but receives them all as children. They shall persevere in the catholic faith and the religion of our Lord and Saviour Jesus Christ, and strive always to promote it. And because you have fulfilled the office of the apostles in preaching Christ and propagating his faith, and have tried to do in your realm the work of us and of our clergy, and because you have honored the same prince of apostles above all others, therefore by this privilege we grant you and your successors, who shall have been legally elected and approved by the apostolic see, the right to have the cross borne before you as a sign of apostleship,{68} after you have been crowned with the crown which we send and according to the ceremony which we have committed to your ambassadors. And we likewise give you full power by our apostolic authority to control and manage all the churches of your realm, both present and future, as divine grace may guide you, as representing us and our successors. All these things are contained more fully and explicitly in that general letter which we have sent by our messenger to you and to your nobles and faithful subjects. And we pray that omnipotent God, who called you even from your mother’s womb to the kingdom and crown, and who has commanded us to give you the crown which we had prepared for the duke of Poland, may increase continually the fruits of your good works, and sprinkle with the dew of his benediction this young plant of your kingdom, and preserve you and your realm and protect you from all enemies, visible and invisible, and, after the trials of the earthly kingship are past, crown you with an eternal crown in the kingdom of heaven. Given at Rome, March 27, in the thirteenth indiction [AD 1000].

== Second creation ==
Pope Leo X having conferred the title of Defensor Fidei on Henry VIII of England in 1521, the nobles of Hungary, headed by Stephen Werbőczy, later Palatine of Hungary, negotiated unsuccessfully with the Holy See to confirm the title of "Apostolic Majesty" for King Louis II of Hungary.

In 1627, Emperor Ferdinand III endeavoured to obtain the title, but was discouraged by the Primate of Hungary, Péter Pázmány and the Holy See. Later, when Emperor Leopold I (1657–1705) established supreme royal authority over ecclesiastical jurisdiction and administration, the title "Apostolic Majesty" came into use.

Holy Roman Empress Maria Theresia, Queen of Hungary, used the title "Apostolic Queen" for the first time in letters patent to the imperial envoy to the College of Cardinals after the death of Pope Benedict XIV, hoping that the new pontiff would approve the title. Pope Clement XIII acceded, granting this title for the rulers of Hungary in a motu proprio, the Papal Brief "Carissima in Christo filia" of 19 August 1758. An edict of Maria Theresa prescribed the title "Apostolic King of Hungary" for all future official documents.

Henceforth the King of Hungary bore this title after his coronation, though it did not extend to the King's spouse (Empress-consort of Austria), nor to his heir, who was crowned rex junior during the King's lifetime.

After the dissolution of the Holy Roman Empire, Franz Joseph I of Austria was titled "His Imperial and Royal Apostolic Majesty" (Seine Kaiserliche und Königlich Apostolische Majestät, Hungarian: Ő császári és apostoli királyi Felsége) along with his consort Empress Elisabeth, who was styled "Her Imperial and Royal Apostolic Majesty" (Ihre Kaiserliche und Königlich Apostolische Majestät). The plural for the couple was also used as "Their Imperial and Royal Apostolic Majesties" (Ihre Kaiserlichen und Königlich Apostolischen Majestäten). The title was abbreviated to HAM or HRAM when used in a Hungarian context, and to HI&RM or HIM when used with the Austrian imperial title.

The powers of the crown over the Catholic Church in Hungary were not based upon the title "Apostolic Majesty", but upon the supreme royal right of patronage.

The title has not been used since the dissolution of Austria-Hungary in 1918. Although Hungary was again called a kingdom between 1920 and 1946, it was led by a regent and did not have a monarch to whom the title could apply.

== Similar titles ==
Main Article: List of treaty titles for monarchs

The monarchs of other countries have received similar titles from the pope:

- France: Most Christian Majesty (awarded c. 1380)
- Spain: Most Catholic Majesty (awarded in 1493)
- England: Defender of the Faith (awarded in 1521 and revoked again c. 1530 by the Pope. Granted again in 1543 by the Parliament of England.)
- Germany: Defensor Ecclesiae (Protector of the Church; awarded to Holy Roman Emperors)
- Poland: Orthodox Majesty (awarded in 1661)
- Portugal: Most Faithful Majesty (awarded in 1748)
