= Contingent sovereignty =

Interventionist theory

Contingent sovereignty refers to the new and still evolving theory which challenges the norm of non-intervention in the internal affairs of countries, commonly associated with the Westphalian doctrine of sovereignty.

In 2007, Stewart Patrick of the United States State Department described the contingent sovereignty as follows.

Historically, the main obstacle to armed intervention – humanitarian or otherwise – has been the doctrine of sovereignty, which prohibits violating the territorial integrity of another state. One of the striking developments of the past decade has been an erosion of this non-intervention norm and the rise of a nascent doctrine of “contingent sovereignty.”

This school of thought holds that sovereign rights and immunities are not absolute. They depend on the observance of fundamental state obligations. These include the responsibility to protect the citizens of the state. When a regime makes war on its people or cannot prevent atrocities against them, it risks forfeiting its claim to non-intervention. In such circumstances, the responsibility to protect may devolve to the international community.

This emerging consensus reflects the traumas of the twentieth century. The seminal event was the Holocaust, but it was hardly the last to shock the conscience of humankind. From the killing fields of Cambodia to the bloody hills of Rwanda, a litany of atrocities has mocked our earnest, repeated pledges of 'Never Again.'

Following the NATO intervention in Kosovo in 1999, UN Secretary General Kofi Annan described what he termed a "developing international norm ... that massive and systematic violations of human rights wherever they may take place ... should not be allowed to stand." No longer should frontiers be considered an absolute defense behind which states can commit crimes against humanity with "sovereign impunity."

The concept of contingent sovereignty is evolving and currently not codified in international law.

== Criticism ==
Critics argue that the concept of contingent sovereignty allows powerful countries, such as the United States, too much scope to invade other countries based in their own judgements about the human rights abuses or other wrongdoing of the government of the country concerned.

== See also ==
- Responsibility to protect
- Humanitarian intervention
- Sovereignty
- Just War theory
