= Britannic Majesty =

Diplomatic title denoting the British monarch

His Britannic Majesty or, when the reigning monarch is female Her Britannic Majesty (HBM), is a treaty title for the monarch of the United Kingdom, a royal style used in international law and diplomacy. It is used on the international plane in the same way that His Majesty or Her Majesty is used to refer to the king or queen domestically, the addition of Britannic serving to identify the state (United Kingdom) in question. It is particularly used in treaties and other formal instruments sent and received between nations. Many other monarchies in Europe used similar conventional terms as treaty titles to identify their respective monarchs.

Initially, His/Her Britannic Majesty referred to the monarch of the Kingdom of Great Britain. After the Acts of Union 1800, it referred to the monarch of the United Kingdom. With the expansion of the British Empire, the term came to refer to the British monarch as the sovereign of the entire British Empire. With changes in the constitutional relations between different Commonwealth realms, today it is only appropriate to use the term to refer to the Crown in right of the United Kingdom and not, for example, the Crown in right of Australia, Canada, or New Zealand. It is not, however, invoked in agreements signed between the United Kingdom and the other Commonwealth realms, because the monarch cannot contract with themselves. Unlike treaties with other countries, agreements amongst Commonwealth realms are concluded between the respective governments, not the respective sovereigns.

Examples include:

- The Convention for the Mutual Abandonment of Nootka of 1794 between Spain and Great Britain referred to the Spanish monarch as His Catholic Majesty and the British monarch as His Britannic Majesty.
- The Treaty of Chaumont of 1814 between Austria and the United Kingdom referred to the Austrian monarch as His Imperial and Royal Apostolic Majesty and the British monarch as His Britannic Majesty.
- In the Mandate for Palestine of the League of Nations, that instrument designated His Britannic Majesty as the Mandatory for Palestine.
- British passports bear a request which invokes His Britannic Majesty:
  His Britannic Majesty's Secretary of State Requests and requires in the Name of His Majesty all those whom it may concern to allow the bearer to pass freely without let or hindrance, and to afford the bearer such assistance and protection as may be necessary.

== See also ==
- Forms of address in the United Kingdom
- Style of the British sovereign
