= Rameshwari =

Rameshwari may refer to:

- Talluri Rameshwari, Indian actress from Andhra Pradesh
- Rameshwari Nehru, Indian social worker who married into the Nehru family
- University of Oxford v. Rameshwari Photocopy Service, a landmark 2016 Delhi High Court case regarding copyright
- Rameshwari, a fictional character portrayed by Farhana Bhatt in the 2023 Indian film Country of Blind

== See also ==
- Rameswaram (disambiguation)
