= Defender of the Faith =

Title of several European Christian monarchs

Defender of the Faith (Latin: Fidei Defensor or, specifically feminine, Fidei Defensatrix; French: Défenseur de la Foi) is a phrase used as part of the full style of many English, Scottish and later British monarchs since the early 16th century, as well as by other monarchs and heads of state. The earliest use of the term appears in 1507, when James IV of Scotland was granted the title of "Protector and Defender of the Christian Faith" by Pope Julius II.

== Scottish, English and British usage ==
=== History ===
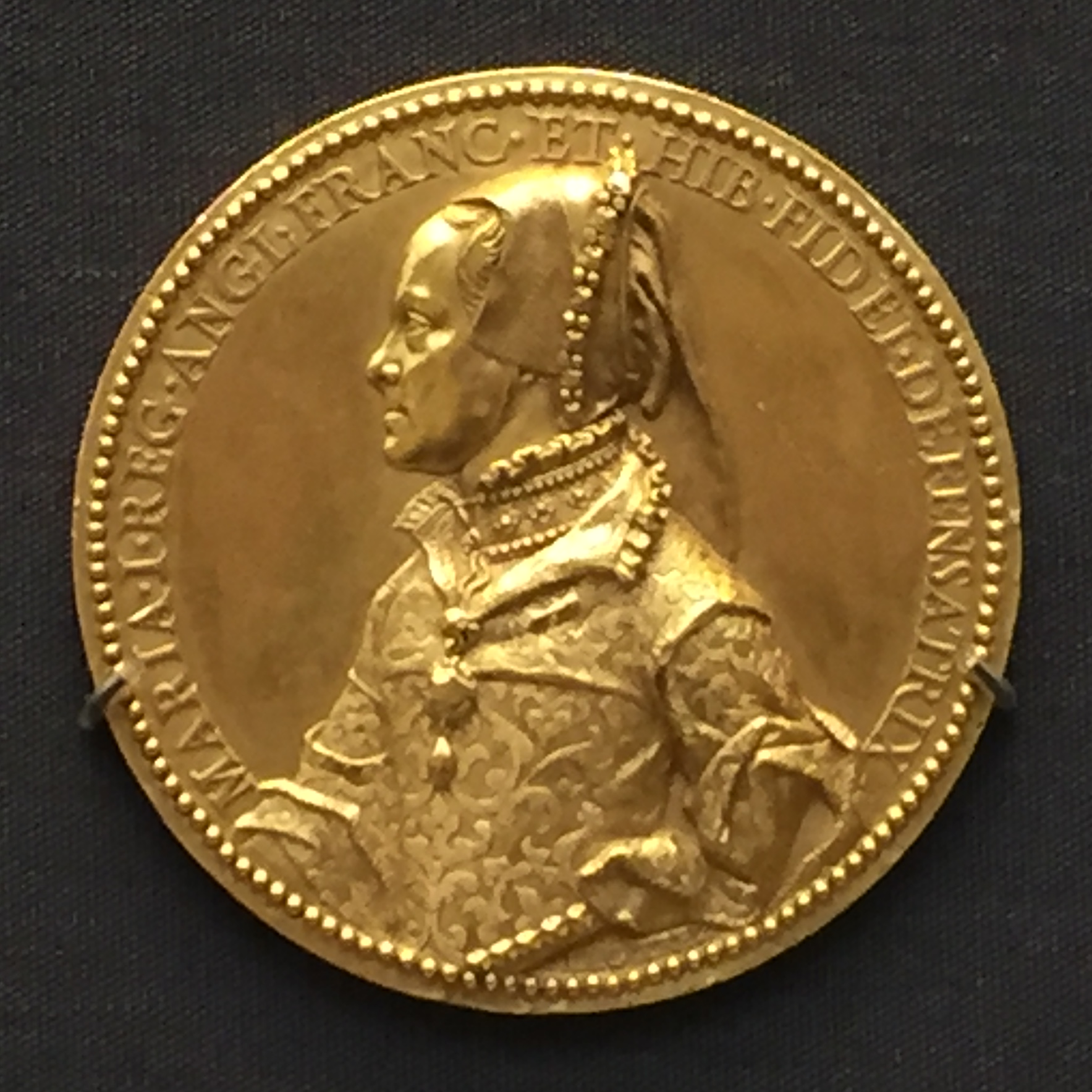
Medal of Queen Mary I of England with the legend "Maria I Reg. Angl. Franc. et Hib. Fidei Defensatrix"

The earliest use of the term appears in 1507, when King James IV of Scotland was granted the title of "Protector and Defender of the Christian Faith" by Pope Julius II. The title was conferred on James IV by the papal legate Robert Bellenden in a lavish ceremony in Holyrood Abbey.

"Defender of the Faith" has been one of the subsidiary titles of the English and later British monarchs since it was granted on 11 October 1521 by Pope Leo X to King Henry VIII. His wife Catherine of Aragon also used the title. The title was conferred in recognition of Henry's book Assertio Septem Sacramentorum (Defence of the Seven Sacraments), which defended the sacramental nature of marriage and the supremacy of the pope. This was also known as the "Henrician Affirmation" and was seen as an important opposition to the early stages of the Protestant Reformation, especially the ideas of Martin Luther.

Following Henry's decision to break with Rome in 1530 and establish himself as head of the Church of England, the title was revoked by Pope Paul III and he was excommunicated. However in 1543 the Parliament of England conferred (by a bill entitled "The Bill for the Kinges Stile") on King Henry VIII and his successors, now the defenders of the Anglican faith, the style "Henry the Eighth by the Grace of God King of England, France and Ireland, Defender of the Faith and of the Church of England and also of Ireland in Earth the Supreme Head". All subsequent monarchs (except the Catholic Queen Mary I) became supreme governors.

King James V of Scotland was granted the title of "Defender of the Faith" by Pope Paul III on 19 January 1537, symbolizing the hopes of the papacy that the King of Scots would resist the path that his uncle Henry VIII had followed. Neither this title nor James IV's title of "Protector and Defender of the Christian Faith" became part of the full style of the monarch of Scotland.

During The Protectorate (1653–59), the republican heads of state Oliver Cromwell and Richard Cromwell, more clearly profiled as Protestant than the monarchy, although claiming divine sanction, did not adopt the style "Defender of the Faith". The style was reintroduced after the restoration of the monarchy and remains in use to this day.

=== Modern usage ===
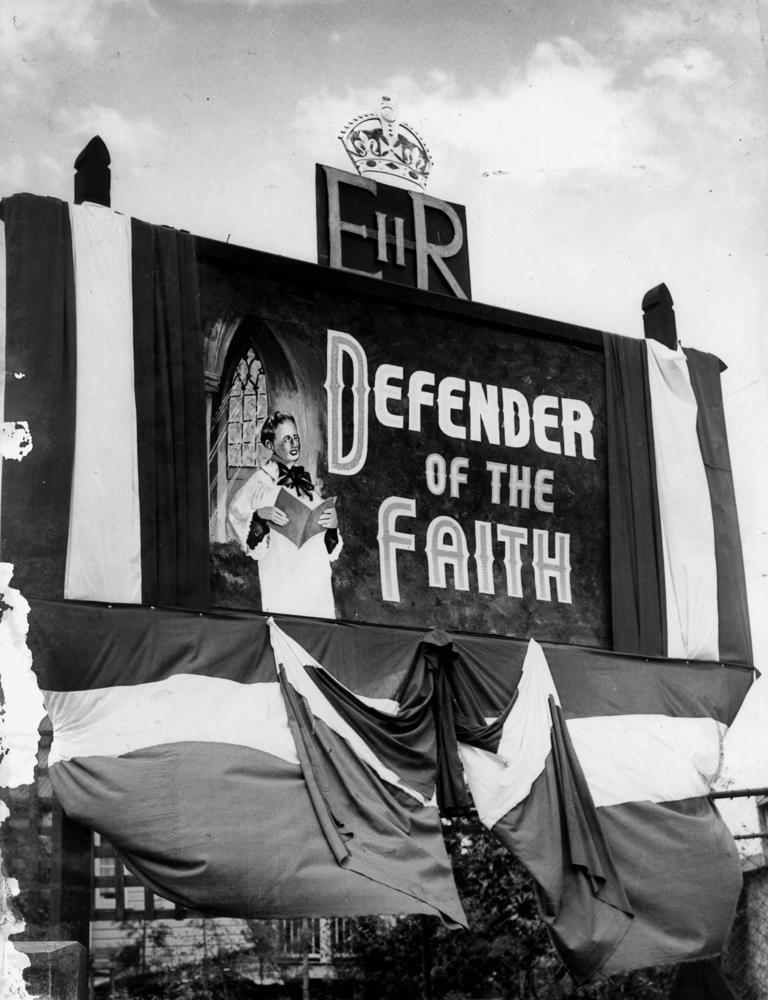
Church decorations in Vulture Street, South Brisbane for the royal visit, 1954

In his capacity as King of the United Kingdom, Charles III is styled "Charles the Third, by the Grace of God of the United Kingdom of Great Britain and Northern Ireland and of His other Realms and Territories King, Head of the Commonwealth, Defender of the Faith". The title "Defender of the Faith" reflects the Sovereign's position as the supreme governor of the Church of England. The original Latin phrase Fidei Defensor is represented on all current British coins by the abbreviations F D or FID DEF. This notation was first added to British coins in 1714, during the reign of King George I. The decision of the Royal Mint to omit this and certain other parts of the monarch's style from the "Godless Florin" in 1849 caused such a scandal that the coin was replaced.

In most Commonwealth realms, the phrase does not appear in the Monarch's full style, though the initial "By the Grace of God" is maintained. For example, in Australia, King Charles is currently styled "by the Grace of God, King of Australia and His other Realms and Territories, Head of the Commonwealth". He is additionally styled "Defender of the Faith" only in New Zealand and the UK. Canada had initially chosen to include the phrase, not because the sovereign is regarded as the protector of the state religion (Canada has none), but as a defender of faith in general. In a speech to the House of Commons in 1953, Prime Minister Louis St. Laurent stated:

The question then arose whether it would be proper to have in the title we would use the traditional words, "by the grace of God", sovereign. We felt that our people did recognize that the affairs of this world were not determined exclusively by the volition of men and women; that they were determined by men and women as agents for a supreme authority; and that it was by the grace of that supreme authority that we were privileged to have such a person as our sovereign. Then perhaps the rather more delicate question arose about the retention of the words "defender of the faith". In England there is an established church. In our countries [the other monarchies of the Commonwealth] there are no established churches, but in our countries there are people who have faith in the direction of human affairs by an all-wise Providence, and we felt that it was a good thing that the civil authorities would proclaim that their organization is such that it is a defence of the continued beliefs in a supreme power that orders the affairs of mere men, and that there could be no reasonable objection from anyone who believed in the Supreme Being in having the sovereign, the head of the civil authority, described as a believer in and a defender of the faith in a supreme ruler.

However, the style used on Canadian coinage is simply D.G. Rex (Dei Gratia Rex, "By the Grace of God, King").

In Australia, the monarch held the title "Defender of the Faith" until 1973, when it was formally removed. (The words "by the Grace of God" were retained, however.)

South Africa dropped the title from 29 May 1953, as did Pakistan and Ceylon in recognition of the contradiction between their populations being overwhelmingly either Muslim or Buddhist but having a monarch who was a defender of the Christian faith. Newer Commonwealth realms, on becoming independent, never adopted the title at all.

Queen Elizabeth II in 2012 stated that "The concept of our established Church is occasionally misunderstood and, I believe, commonly under-appreciated. Its role is not to defend Anglicanism to the exclusion of other religions. Instead, the Church has a duty to protect the free practice of all faiths in this country. It certainly provides an identity and spiritual dimension for its own many adherents. But also, gently and assuredly, the Church of England has created an environment for other faith communities and indeed people of no faith to live freely."

King Charles III, when still heir apparent, expressed a preference to change the spirit of this role should he succeed to the throne as expected. He commented in 1994: "I personally would rather see [my future role] as Defender of Faith, not the Faith"; however, he clarified in 2015 that "while at the same time being Defender of the Faith you can also be protector of faiths". Upon his accession, as per the Royal Titles Act, he adopted "Defender of the Faith" as part of his legal title.

In 2023, the Parliament of Canada approved a new Royal Style and Titles Act to change the title of the Canadian sovereign by dropping the reference to the United Kingdom and the phrase "Defender of the Faith". The new style and title of the Canadian sovereign became operative when the King issued a proclamation on 8 January 2024. The Canadian title is now:

Charles the Third, by the Grace of God King of Canada and His other Realms and Territories, Head of the Commonwealth./Charles Trois, par la grâce de Dieu, Roi du Canada et de ses autres royaumes et territoires, Chef du Commonwealth.

The Sovereign Grant report for 2024–25, referred to the King's role as "Head of Nation" and described him as "Head of the Church of England and Defender of the Faith". For the 2025–26 report, this was changed, with the King referred to as "Supreme Governor of the Church of England" who "protects the space for Faith within the multi-faith nation".

== Usage in the French language ==
=== Haiti ===
In 1811 when he proclaimed himself king, Henri I of Haiti awarded himself the title "le défenseur de la foi" and incorporated it into his full style: (Note: The Kingdom of Haiti's constitution only gave the introductory legitimation and first title: par la grâce de Dieu et la loi constitutionnelle de l'état, roi d'Haïti.)

par la grâce de Dieu et la loi constitutionnelle de l'état, roi du Haïti, souverains de Tortuga, Gonâve et d'autres îles adjacentes, destroyer de tyrannie, régénérateur et bienfaiteur de la nation de Haitian, créateur de ses établissements moraux, politiques et de Martial, le premier a couronné le monarque du nouveau monde, le défenseur de la foi, fondateur de la commande royale et militaire de Saint-Henry

which translates to English as:

by the Grace of God and the Constitutional Law of the State, King of Haiti, Sovereign of Tortuga, Gonâve and other adjacent Islands, Destroyer of Tyranny, Regenerator and Benefactor of the Haitian Nation, Creator of her Moral, Political and Martial Institutions, First Crowned Monarch of the New World, Defender of the Faith, founder of the Royal and Military Order of Saint Henry

=== Canada ===
The French variant was used until 2024 as part of the official French-language version of the monarch's style in Canada: "Charles Trois, par la grâce de Dieu Roi du Royaume-Uni, du Canada et de ses autres royaumes et territoires, Chef du Commonwealth, Défenseur de la Foi."

== Usage elsewhere ==
=== Poland ===
In 1684, Pope Innocent XI granted the honorary title Defensor Fidei (Polish: Obrońca Wiary) to John III Sobieski, king of Poland, who took the supreme command of the Christian Coalition army during the Battle of Vienna, considered as a turning point in the history of Europe, preventing it from being conquered by the Ottoman Empire.

=== Ethiopia ===
One of the titles of Haile Selassie I, Emperor of Ethiopia, was Defender of the Faith.

=== Other non-Christian examples ===
One of the titles bestowed to Shivaji, the first Chhatrapati of the Maratha Empire, was Haindava Dharmoddharaka, which means Defender of Hinduism.

In Sunni Islam, the historical leader of the faith was a secular ruler, rather than a spiritual one. The title of this leader was Caliph, deriving from the Arabic Khalifah, which can be loosely translated to "steward", "deputy", or "successor" (as the Caliph was the successor to the Prophet Muhammad, and the steward of his community on Earth). An additional title used by Caliphs was Amir al-Mu'minin, meaning "Commander (Emir) of the Faithful". This title is still used by leaders who have historically claimed the Caliphate but officially do so no longer, like the King of Morocco and the Sultan of Sokoto. The secular ruler responsible for the maintenance and stewardship of the Masjid al-Haram in Mecca and the Mosque of the Prophet in Medina, as well as protecting the Hajj pilgrimage and its rituals, is called the Custodian of the Two Holy Mosques. This title is currently held by the King of Saudi Arabia.

In Thailand, five religious groups are legally recognized: Buddhists, Muslims, Brahmin-Hindus, Sikhs, and Christians. There is no official state religion, but the constitution provides (section 7): "The King is a Buddhist and Upholder of Religions".

== Similar titles ==
The monarchs of other countries have received similar titles from the pope:

- Hungary: Apostolic Majesty (awarded c. 1000)
- France: Most Christian Majesty (awarded c. 1380)
- Spain: Most Catholic Majesty (awarded in 1493)
- Germany: Defensor Ecclesiae (Protector of the Church; awarded to Holy Roman Emperors)
- Poland: Orthodox Majesty (awarded in 1661)
- Portugal: Most Faithful Majesty (awarded in 1748)

== See also ==
- By the Grace of God
- Dieu et mon droit
- Style of the British sovereign
- Defensor Perpétuo do Império do Brasil
- Amir al-Mu'minin (Commander of the Faithful) in Islam
