= Most Gracious Majesty =

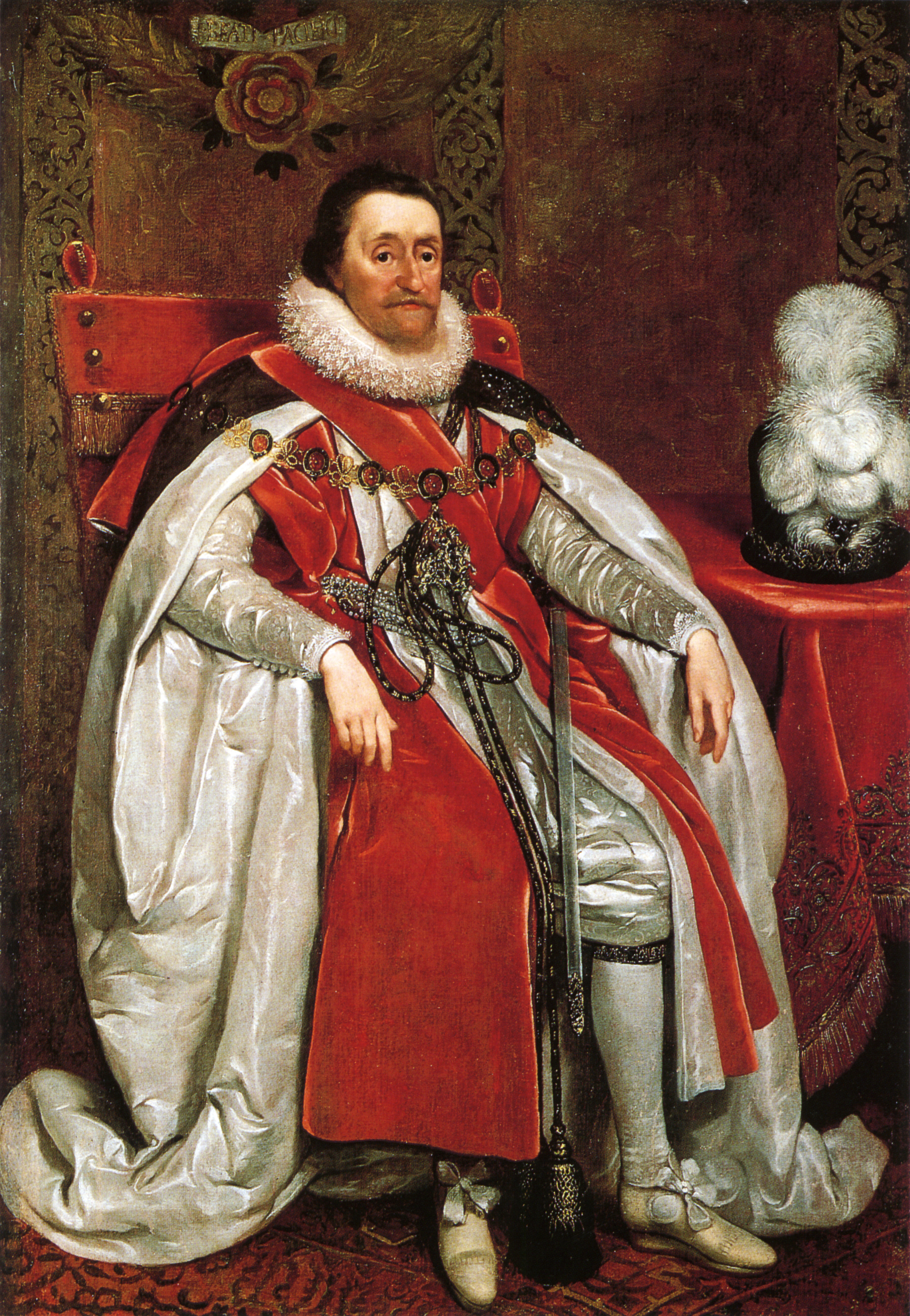
King James introduced Majesty as the official royal style to the exclusion of all others in Scotland, England and Ireland

Most Gracious Majesty is a form of address in the United Kingdom. It is an elaborate version of Your Majesty and is only used in the most formal of occasions.

== Historical background ==
Around 1519 King Henry VIII decided Majesty should become the style of the sovereign of England. "Majesty", however, was not used exclusively; it arbitrarily alternated with both "Highness" and "Grace", even in official documents. For example, one legal judgment issued by Henry VIII uses all three indiscriminately; Article 15 begins with "the Kinges Highness hath ordered," Article 16 with "the Kinges Majestie" and Article 17 with "the Kinges Grace."

In pre-Union Scotland, sovereigns were only addressed as Your Grace.

During the reign of James VI of Scotland and I of England and Ireland, however, James made Majesty the official title, to the exclusion of others.

The style "His/Her Most Excellent Majesty" is used solely for a present or past reigning monarch. The style "Her Most Gracious Majesty" may be used for a queen consort, queen mother, or dowager queen, in addition to a present or past reigning monarch.

In 2012, the Speaker of the House of Commons and Lord Speaker used a modified version of this style, addressing Queen Elizabeth II as 'Most Gracious Sovereign'.

== See also ==
- Forms of address in the United Kingdom
- Style of the British Sovereign
- Your Majesty
- Your Grace
