= Orthodox Majesty =

Title given by the Pope to the monarch of Poland

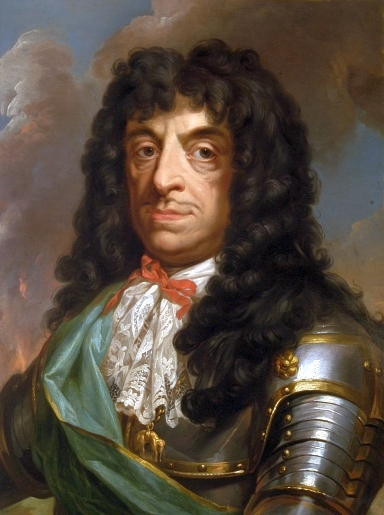
King John II Casimir

Orthodox Majesty (Latin: Rex Orthodoxus, Polish: Król prawowierny) was the honorific title given in 1661 by Pope Alexander VII to King John II Casimir of Poland and Lithuania and his successors. This was done as a reward for the banishment of Socinians from Poland by the Sejm in 1658.

The sobriquet Righteous King in its original, Latin version of Rex Orthodoxus was wrongly connected with the Eastern Christian Orthodoxy, while the traditional and dominant religion in the state was Catholicism. The original grantee, John II Casimir, abdicated in 1668 and left Poland.

The title was eventually not adopted by the successive Polish monarchs and used only occasionally by John III, who himself was given the title of Defender of the Faith (Defensor Fidei) by Pope Innocent XI in 1684, following his victory over the Ottoman Empire at the decisive Battle of Vienna in 1683.

== Similar titles ==
The monarchs of other countries have received similar titles from the Pope:

- Hungary: Apostolic Majesty (awarded c. 1000)
- France: Most Christian Majesty (awarded c. 1380)
- Spain: Most Catholic Majesty (awarded in 1493)
- England: Defender of the Faith (awarded in 1521 and revoked in c. 1530 by the Pope. Granted again in 1543 by the Parliament of England.)
- Portugal: Most Faithful Majesty (awarded in 1748)
- Germany: Defensor Ecclesiae (Protector of the Church; awarded to Holy Roman Emperors)
