= Rameswaram, Kakinada district =

Rameswaram రామేశ్వరం
- Village
- Interactive map of Rameswaram
- Location within Andhra Pradesh
- Coordinates: 16.9667°N 82.1833°E
- Country: India
- State: Andhra Pradesh
- District: Kakinada
- Mandal: Pedapudi

Languages
  - Official: Telugu
- Time zone: UTC+5:30 (IST)
- PIN: 533006
- Telephone code: 0884

Rameswaram is a village in the Kakinada district of Andhra Pradesh, India. The village is situated 5 kilometres west to the district headquarters Kakinada.

== Geography ==
Rameswaram is located at 16.9667°N 82.1833°E. The 82-degrees east longitude passes through the place. It has an elevation of 4 metres (13 ft) above sea level.

It is situated 5 km to the west of district headquarters Kakinada and 60 km to the east of the city of Rajahmundry.

== Governance ==
The area falls under Rameswaram Panchayati. The village falls under Anaparthy Assembly constituency and Rajahmundry Lok Sabha constituency.

== Transport ==
The nearest domestic airport is the Rajahmundry Airport at a distance of 60 km and the nearest international airport is the Alluri Sitarama Raju International Airport at a distance of 160 km. The nearest railway stations are the Kakinada Town railway station and Samalkot Junction railway station.

== Education ==
Primary and secondary education is provided by government and private schools, overseen by the state's School Education Department. Instruction is delivered in English and Telugu.
