= Res publica Christiana =

Medieval term for international community of Christian peoples and states

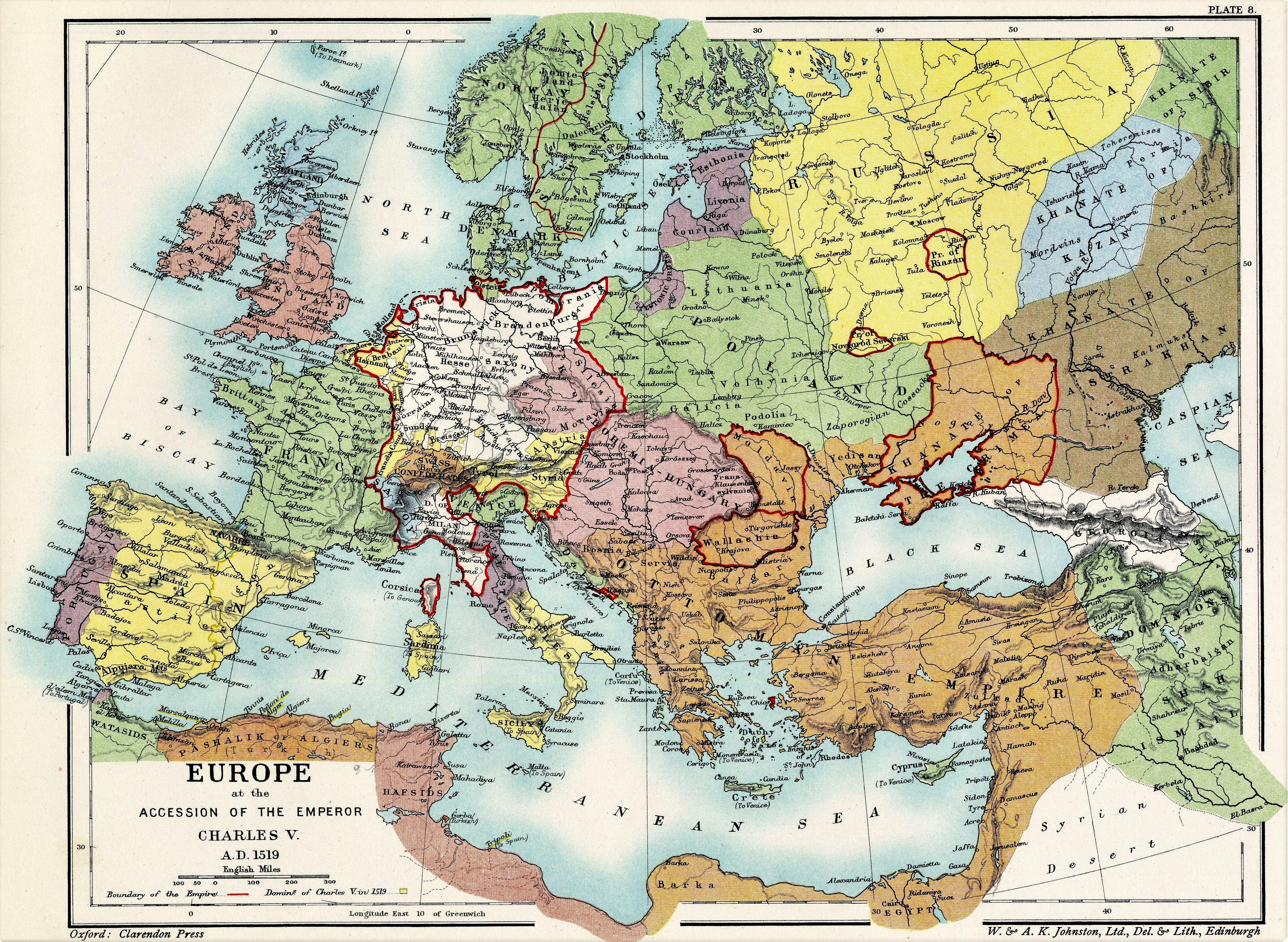
Europe in the year 1519

In medieval and early modern Western political thought, the respublica or res publica Christiana refers to the international community of Christian peoples and states. As a Latin phrase, res publica Christiana combines Christianity with the originally Roman idea of the res publica ("republic" or "commonwealth") to describe this community and its well-being. A single English word with somewhat comparable meaning is Christendom; it is also translated as "the Christian Commonwealth".

== History ==
=== Late antique and medieval use ===
The concept of a res publica Christiana is first attested in Augustine of Hippo, whose early 5th century work The City of God contrasted the Christian church favourably against the claims of the Roman Empire to constitute a res publica, a republic or commonwealth. He challenged Rome's legitimacy as a state established for the public good on the grounds that its empire had been won by force and not by justice; by contrast, he claimed, the Christian church was a true res publica, founded for the good of humanity. In another work, De opere monachorum, Augustine stated explicitly that "there is one commonwealth of all Christians" ("omnium enim christianorum una respublica est").

Despite Augustine's distinction, in subsequent usage the imperial and ecclesiastical res publica blended together. Thus in the late antique and early medieval period, from the Byzantine Papacy of the 6th century to the turn of the 11th, the papal chancery used the term res publica Christiana mainly to refer to the Christian empire: first the Byzantine Empire in the east, then, from 800, the Carolingian or Holy Roman Empire in the west. The re-establishment of empire in the west subsequently led the popes to use the term in letters of exhortation to Frankish kings who did not necessarily bear the title of emperor themselves, as for example Pope John VIII writing to King Louis the Stammerer in 878 of the "state of the Christian religion and commonwealth" ("statu Christiane religionis ac rei publicae").

By the 11th century, the term had been generalized through application in different political contexts to mean the totality of Christian states as a community under the leadership of the pope—the primary sense it retained in the Middle Ages from this time on. The unity of the Christian community was a central supposition of medieval European political thought. In the words of the historian of international relations Garrett Mattingly, medieval Catholic Europe "thought of itself as one society", the res publica Christiana, and though this res publica was never realized as a unified state, it existed politically as a common body of law shared across the region's various countries and developed by an international community of jurists. The term in this sense was closely related to the medieval concept that human society was a universal monarchy governed by the pope or emperor as "lord of the world" (dominus mundi); thus it was used by Emperor Frederick II, for example, to describe his various dominions in the 13th century.

=== Renaissance reconceptualization ===
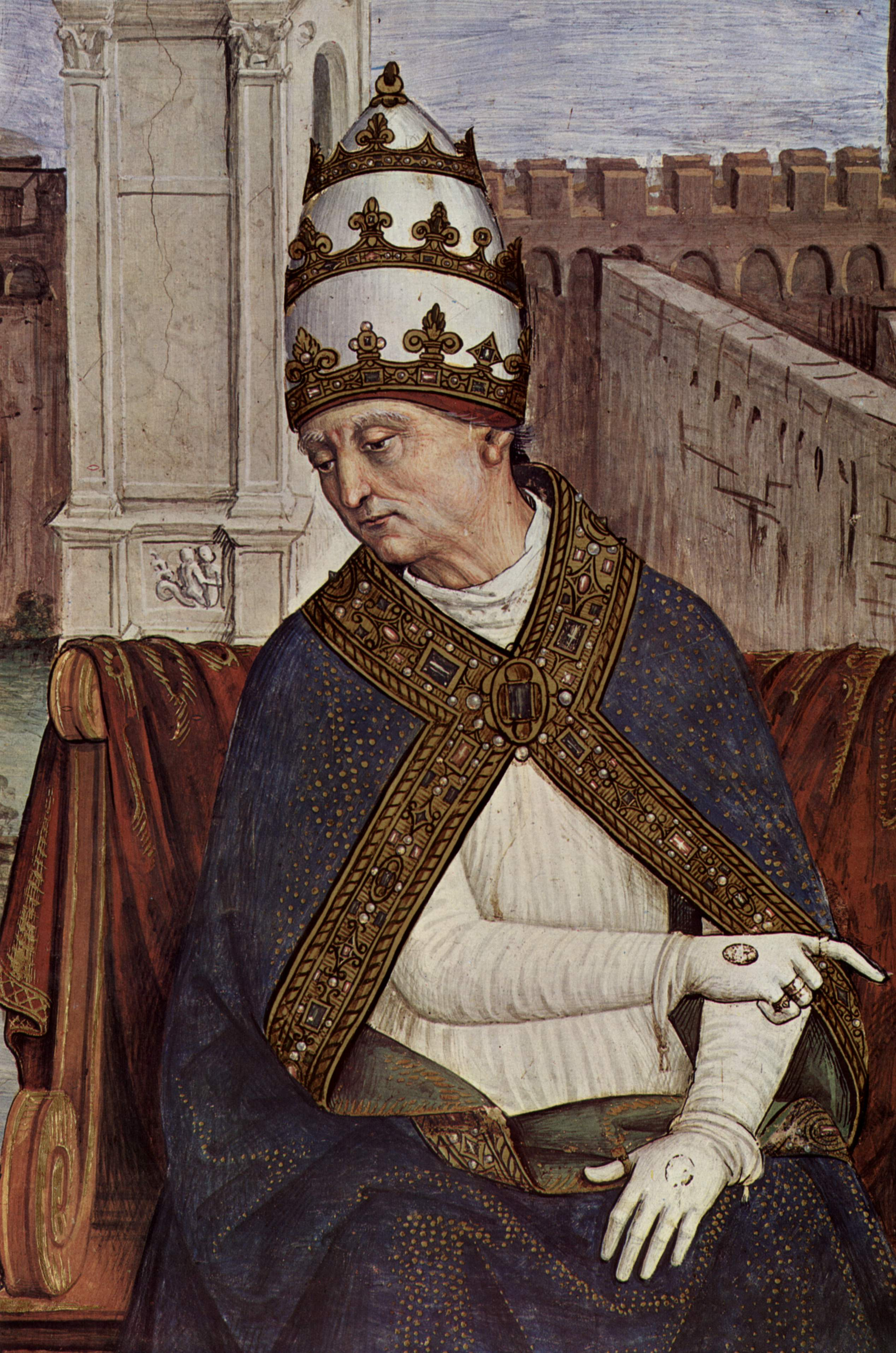
Pope Pius II (reigned 1458–1464) exhorted European rulers to defend the res publica Christiana after the fall of Constantinople.

Although it designated a key concept in medieval political thought, until the 15th century the term res publica Christiana itself remained relatively rare compared to alternatives without a specifically political meaning, such as Christianitas. It was only in the Renaissance era that the res publica Christiana took on renewed significance: in papal documents, after a period of disuse beginning in the 13th century, the term was revived in the 15th and early 16th centuries by humanist popes such as Pius II, who invoked it in calling for a crusade following the fall of Constantinople to the forces of Mehmed the Conqueror in 1453, and Leo X, likewise concerned in the 1510s to encourage the rulers of Europe to defend Christendom against the Ottoman Turks.

In these cases, the term designated Christian Europe as a political community with a shared secular interest. Thus, for the 16th-century humanist jurist Andrea Alciato, different norms of international law applied to non-Christians in Asia and Africa, who were not citizens of the res publica. Equally, the feuds between different European powers were conceived of as internecine civil wars within the commonwealth, distracting Christians from threats to the res publica as a whole. In its elaboration by other 16th-century theorists such as Erasmus and Justus Lipsius, this Renaissance concept of the political res publica Christiana was explicitly pluralist, de-emphasizing the specific political leadership of the pope and replacing the medieval idea of a unitary Christian empire.

=== Transition to the modern state system ===
Modern historians of international relations such as Hedley Bull and Cathal J. Nolan have argued that Europe ceased being a res publica Christiana due to the 16th- and 17th-century wars of the Reformation and Counter-Reformation and became a "state system" with a sharp separation of church and state. In 1535/36, the Kingdom of France formed an alliance with the Ottoman Empire thus destroying the idea of a united Christendom during crusades. The principle of cuius regio, eius religio ("whose realm, his religion"), first formulated at the Peace of Augsburg (1555), was confirmed at the Peace of Westphalia (1648), which gave secular states sovereignty over religions, and rejected any supranational religious authority. The Tsardom of Russia was accepted into the res publica with the Peace of Westphalia. The last reference to the res publica Christiana in a state document is found in the Peace of Utrecht (1713)—also the first treaty to contain a reference to the balance of power. By the end of the 18th century, both the Kingdom of Prussia (1761 and 1790) and the Habsburg monarchy (1771 and 1791) formed alliances with the Ottoman Empire accepting it as a part of the European great powers. The Holy Alliance of 1815 between Russia, Prussia and Austria was one of the last attempts of forming an alliance based on a common Christian identity before it was completely abandoned in favour of the secular idea of "civilized nations".

Even as the religious and political unity of Europe disintegrated, however, the res publica Christiana continued to be influential as an alternative model of international relations through the 17th century. The duc de Sully, chief minister of Henry IV of France at the turn of the 17th century, and his later successor Cardinal Richelieu both sought to realize a form of res publica Christiana: Sully in the form of a proposal for a federal council of Christian states to resolve conflicts in Europe, Richelieu under the label of the "peace of Christendom" (paix de la chrétienté). As late as 1715, the German polymath Gottfried Wilhelm Leibniz appealed to the concept of a res publica Christiana under the leadership of the pope and emperor as a federative model for European political unity.

=== Later Catholic use ===
In Catholic theology the res publica Christiana came to refer primarily to the Catholic Church itself as a self-sufficient societas perfecta ("perfect society"), but it retained some of its political currency after the 17th century. One example of subsequent use of the phrase is the 1766 encyclical of Pope Clement XIII, Christianae reipublicae salus ("The Welfare of the Christian Commonwealth"), which condemned the "desolation" caused to the res publica by the free circulation of anti-Christian writings and urged Catholic rulers to suppress them. Later, in 1849, ultramontanes in Europe described Pope Pius IX as the leader of a revived res publica Christiana. In his 1890 encyclical Sapientiae christianae, Pope Leo XIII distinguished the Church as the Christiana respublica—rendered in English as "the kingdom of Christ"—from temporal imperium—"civil government"—stating that it was not the Church's prerogative to adjudicate between the different forms and institutions of secular governments.

== See also ==
- Christian state
- Concert of Europe
- European balance of power
- Precedence among European monarchies
