= Rameswaram, Konaseema district =

Rameswaram
- Village
- Interactive map of Rameswaram
- Location within Andhra Pradesh
- Coordinates: 16.3989°N 81.7431°E
- Country: India
- State: Andhra Pradesh
- District: Konaseema
- Mandal: Sakhinetipalli
- Time zone: UTC+05:30 (IST)
- Pincode: 533251

Rameswaram is a village of Sakhinetipalli Mandal in Konaseema district, Andhra Pradesh, India.
