= Ramesuan =

Ramesuan or Rammesuan (Old Thai: รามเมศวร, IPA: [raːm.meː.sǔan]; Modern Thai: ราเมศวร, IPA: [raː.meː.sǔan]; Sanskrit: रामेश्वर Rāmēśvara; "Lord Rāma") was a Thai royal title given to crown princes of the Ayutthaya Kingdom. It may refer to:

- Ramesuan (king of Ayutthaya), reigned twice in 1369–1370 and 1388–1395, a son of King Ramathibodi I
- Ramracha, reigned 1395–1409, a son of King Ramesuan
- Borommatrailokkanat, reigned 1448–1488, a son of King Intharacha
- Ramesuan (prince of Ayutthaya), a son of King Maha Chakkraphat, captured and taken to Burma in the War of the White Elephants (1563–64)
- Ekathotsarot, reigned 1605–1620, a son of King Mahathammarachathirat

== See also ==
- Rameswaram (disambiguation)
