= Most Faithful Majesty =

Title used by Portuguese monarchs from 1748 to 1910

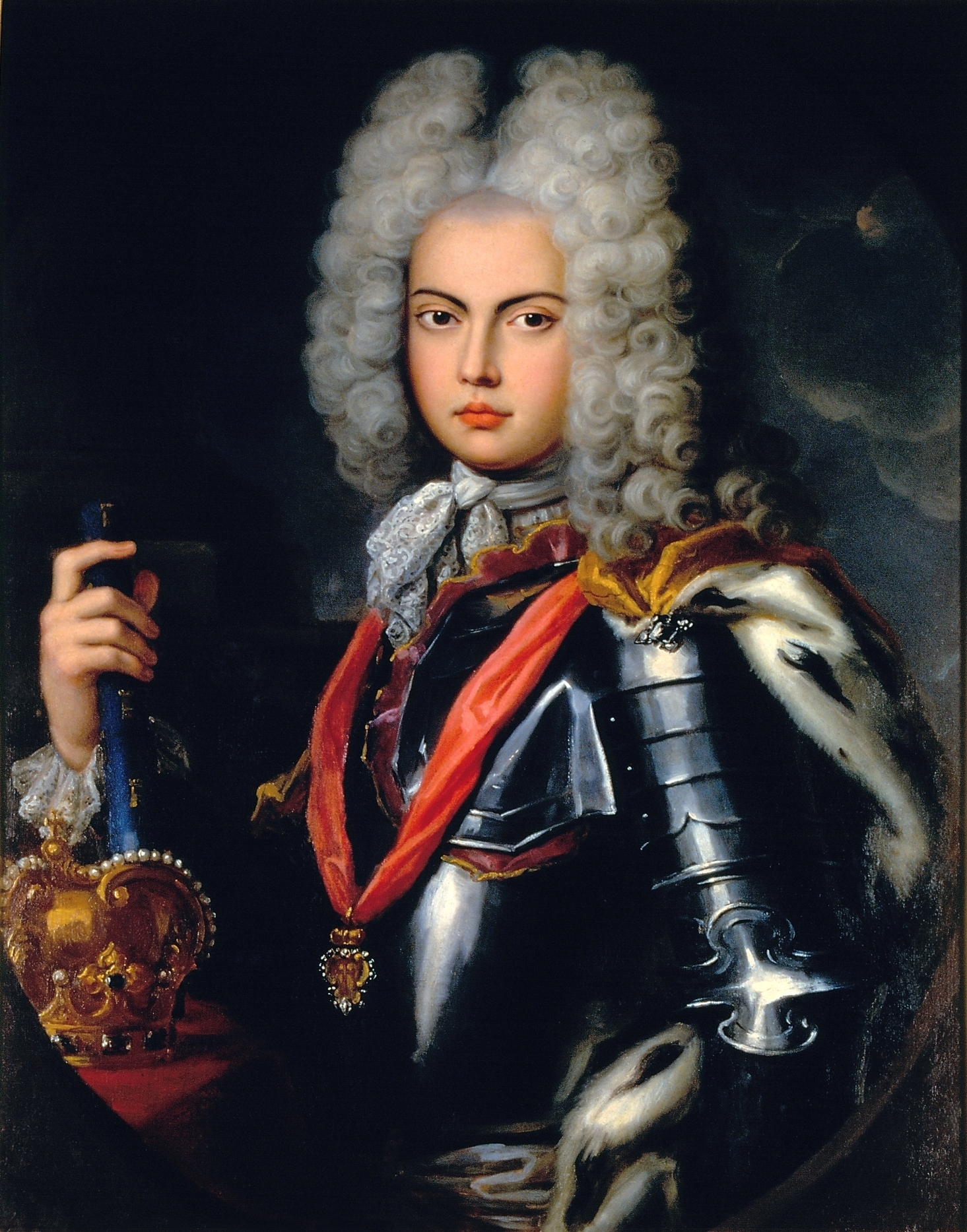
John V of Portugal

Most Faithful Majesty (Portuguese: Sua Majestade Fidelíssima) was the style used by the Portuguese monarchs, from 1748 to 1910. The title fidelissimus (Latin for 'most faithful') is still attached to Portugal, as it was given to Portugal in the person of its sovereigns, and is still being used by the Holy See.

The sobriquet Most Faithful King (Latin: Rex Fidelissimus, Portuguese: Rei Fidelíssimo) was a title awarded by the Pope Benedict XIV – as spiritual head of the Catholic Church – in 1748, to King João V of Portugal and to his heirs.

The title Fidelissimus remains attached to monarchs descended from whoever received the original sobriquet, and to Portugal itself. The sobriquet can be awarded to either a king or a queen. The only European monarchy that has received the sobriquet was the now-defunct monarchy of Portugal.

== Similar titles ==
The monarchs of other countries have received similar titles from the Pope:

- Hungary: Apostolic Majesty (awarded c. 1000)
- France: Most Christian Majesty (awarded c. 1380)
- Spain: Most Catholic Majesty (awarded in 1493)
- England: Defender of the Faith (awarded in 1521 and revoked again c. 1530 by the Pope. Granted again in 1543 by the Parliament of England.)
- Poland: Orthodox Majesty (awarded in 1661)
- Germany: Defensor Ecclesiae (Protector of the Church; awarded to Holy Roman Emperors)
