= Royal and noble styles =

Styles, or forms of address, represent the manner in which monarchs and nobles are properly addressed. Throughout history, many different styles were used, with little standardization. This page will detail the various styles used by royalty and nobility in Europe, in the final form arrived at in the nineteenth century.

== Imperial, royal, and princely styles ==
Only those classified within the social class of royalty and upper nobility have a style of "Highness" attached before their titles. Reigning bearers of forms of Highness included grand princes, grand dukes, reigning princes, reigning dukes, and princely counts, their families, and the agnatic (of the male bloodline) descendants of emperors and kings. Royalty (usually emperors to princely counts) are all considered sovereign princes (German: Fürsten).

- Emperors and empresses held the style of Imperial Majesty (HIM).
- Members of imperial families generally hold the style of Imperial Highness (HIH).
- In the Austrian Empire, the Emperor was also the King of Hungary, and thus bore the style of Imperial and Royal Majesty. Subsequently, members of the imperial family, who were also members of the royal family of Hungary, held the style of Imperial and Royal Highness (HI&RH). Abbreviation to Imperial Highness is common and accepted.
- In the German Empire, the other "heir" to the Holy Roman Empire, the Emperor and Empress were also addressed as Imperial and Royal Majesty, as they ruled over both the German Empire and Kingdom of Prussia. Similarly, the Crown Prince of the Empire and Prussia was styled Imperial and Royal Highness. Other members of the House of Prussia, having no constitutional place in the Empire as such, were only entitled to the style of Royal Highness.
- In Imperial Russia, children and male-line grandchildren of the Emperor bore the style of Imperial Highness. Male-line great-grandchildren held the style of Highness; also, the eldest son of any person who held the style of Highness also held the style of Highness. All other male-line descendants held the style of Serenity, often translated as "Serene Highness". Some Russian noble princes also hold the style of Serenity; all others and Russian princely counts hold the style of Illustriousness, often translated as "Illustrious Highness".
- Kings and queens have the style of His/Her Majesty.
- Members of royal families (princes and princesses) generally have the style of Royal Highness, although in some royal families (for instance, Denmark and Norway), more junior princes and princesses bear the style of Highness.
- Reigning grand dukes and grand duchesses hold the style of Royal Highness.
- The styles of members of grand ducal families have been inconsistent. In Luxembourg, more senior members of the family have also been Royal Highnesses, but only due to their status as Princes of Bourbon-Parma (itself an inconsistency, as Parma was only ducal, but this family has male-line descent from kings of Etruria, Spain and France). In Baden and Hesse and by Rhine, junior members held the style of Grand Ducal Highness. Members of other grand ducal families (for instance, Oldenburg) generally held the style of Highness.
- Reigning dukes and duchesses bore the style of Highness, as did other members of ducal families. Junior members of some ducal families bore the style of Ducal Serene Highness, although it fell out of fashion.
- The elector of Hesse-Kassel also bore the style of Highness, as did other members of the Hesse-Kassel family.
- Reigning princes bear the style of Serene Highness (German: Durchlaucht, French: Son Altesse Sérénissime), as do other members of princely families. Mediatized dukes and princes also bear the style of Serene Highness.
- Mediatized princely counts and countesses bear the style of Illustrious Highness (HIllH, German: Erlaucht).

In addition to their national royal styles, many monarchs have or had "treaty styles" to distinguish one monarch from another in international settings. For example, the sovereign of France was styled "Most Christian Majesty", the King of Hungary as "Apostolic Majesty", and the sovereign of the Holy Roman Empire of the German Nation as "August Majesty". The sovereign of the United Kingdom is customarily referred to as "Britannic Majesty", the king of Spain as His "Catholic Majesty", etc.

Additionally, Monarchs typically have a longer style than other princely members within the same royal house. For example, the monarch of the UK has a much longer style than that of other members of the British royal family. The full style and titles of King Charles III in the UK are "His Majesty Charles the Third, by the Grace of God, of the United Kingdom of Great Britain and Northern Ireland and of His other Realms and Territories King, Head of the Commonwealth, Defender of the Faith".

== Royal and noble styles in France ==
Before the French Revolution, and from 1814 to 1830 (apart from a brief period in 1815), the King of France used the formal style of Most High, Most Potent and Most Excellent Prince (French: Très Haut, Très Puissant et Très Excellent Prince) or Most Christian Majesty (French: Majesté Très Chrétienne). For general usage, however, until the final end of the Bourbon monarchy in 1830, kings and queens of France were styled Majesty (French: Majesté).

- Children and male-line grandchildren of the King used the style of Most High, Most Potent and Excellent Prince or Princess (French: Très Haut, Très Puissant et Excellent Prince) or Royal Highness (French: Altesse Royale) and Lord (French: Monseigneur) followed by their main title.
  - Louis, Grand Dauphin was referred to by the title Monseigneur only, while retaining the style of Royal Highness.
  - The eldest unmarried daughter of the King was referred to by the title Madame only, while retaining the style of Royal Highness.
  - Younger unmarried daughters of the King were referred to by the title Madame followed by their first name, while retaining the style of Royal Highness.
  - The oldest brother of the King was referred to by the title Monsieur only, while retaining the style of Royal Highness.
    - His eldest unmarried daughter was referred to by the title Mademoiselle only, while retaining the style of Royal Highness.
    - Younger unmarried daughters of Monsieur were referred to by the title Mademoiselle followed by their main title, while retaining the style of Royal Highness.
  - Younger brothers of the King used only the style of Monseigneur, followed by their main title.
- Princes of the Blood used the style of Most High, Most Potent and Excellent Prince or Princess (French: Très Haut, Très Puissant et Excellent Prince) or Serene Highness (French: Altesse Sérénissime) and Monseigneur or Mademoiselle, followed by their main title.
  - Until 1707, the First Prince of the Blood (head of the House of Condé) was referred to by the title Monsieur le Prince only, while retaining the style of Serene Highness.
  - After 1707, the head of the House of Condé was referred to by the title Monsieur le Duc only, while retaining the style of Serene Highness.
- Foreign and legitimized princes used the title of High and Potent Prince (French: Haut et Puissant Prince) and claimed the right to use the style of Highness (French: Altesse) and Monseigneur, followed by their main title.
- Dukes and Peers used the style of Most High and Most Potent Lord (French: Très-Haut et Très-Puissant Seigneur), but in the 18th century that style was used by lesser-ranked nobles.
- Other titled nobility used the style of Most High and Potent Lord (French: Très-Haut et Puissant Seigneur) or High and Potent Lord (French: Haut et Puissant Seigneur).

== Noble styles in the United Kingdom ==
- Dukes and duchesses in the peerages of England, Scotland, Great Britain, Ireland, and the United Kingdom (who are not royalty or highness) bear the styles of "Grace" (e.g. "His Grace", "Her Grace", or "Your Grace") and "Most Noble". They also hold the style of "Most High, Potent, and Noble Prince", but even in the most formal situations, this is usually shortened to The Most Noble, which is still considered to be very formal. The Crown officially addresses them as "Our right trusty and entirely beloved Cousin".
- Marquesses and marchionesses bear the styles of The Most Honourable and Lordship (e.g. "His Lordship", "Her Ladyship", "Your Lordship", or "Your Ladyship"). They also hold the style of "Most Noble and Puissant Prince", but even in the most formal situations, this style is rarely used.
- The style of an Earl and a Countess (in her own right) is "Right Honourable" and they are officially, albeit archaically, addressed by the Crown as "Our right trusty and right well-beloved Cousin". On some occasions, an Earl may bear the title of "Most Noble and Puissant Prince".
- The style of a Viscount and a Viscountess (in her own right) is also "Right Honourable" and they are officially addressed by the Crown as "Our right trust and well-beloved Cousin".
- Barons, baronesses, Scottish Lords of Parliament, and Scottish Ladies of Parliament bear the styles of The Right Honourable and Lordship.
- Scottish Barons and Baronesses bear the style of The Much Honoured.

== Belgium ==
Archdukes are always styled as "Your Royal and Imperial Highness". Princes of noble blood are styled Your Serene Highness, and addressed as Monseigneur, while Dukes are addressed as Monseigneur.

== Burma ==
Royal descendants of King Thibaw are always styled "Your Royal and Grand Highness". Princes and Princesses of noble blood are styled "Your Serene Highness", and addressed Htape Tin (Burmese: ထိပ်တင်).

== Noble styles in Germany ==
=== Mediatized nobility ===
- Mediatized dukes (German: Reichsherzöge) and princes (German: Reichsfürsten) in Germany bore the style of Serene Highness (German: Durchlaucht) or, in the case of dukes, Ducal Serene Highness. With regard to dukes, this fell out of use in the 19th century, at least for the reigning members (who are styled as Highness).
- Mediatized counts (German: Reichsgrafen) in Germany bore the style of Illustrious Highness (German: Erlaucht).

=== Non-mediatized nobility ===
- Non-mediatized noble dukes (German: Herzöge) and princes (German: Fürsten) used to bear the title of Ducal/Princely Grace (German: herzogliche/fürstliche Gnaden). They were rare, though, and at the beginning of the 20th century, they were altogether granted the style of Serene Highness by Emperor Franz Joseph I.
- Non-mediatized counts (German: Grafen) in Germany bore the style of High-born (German: Hochgeboren).
- Other German nobles below the rank of count bore the style of High Well-born (German: Hochwohlgeboren). Another style was Well-born (German: Wohlgeboren), which ranked below High Well-born but was not used for proper nobility and therefore fell out of use.

== See also ==
- Ecclesiastical address
- Prince of the Church
- Forms of address in the United Kingdom
- Peerages in the United Kingdom
- Royal and noble ranks
- Thai royal ranks and titles
- False titles of nobility
