= Rex Catholicissimus =

Title given by the Pope to the monarch of Spain

The Latin title Rex Catholicissimus, anglicised as Most Catholic King or Most Catholic Majesty, was awarded by the Pope to the monarchs of Spain. It was first used by Pope Alexander VI in the papal bull Inter caetera in 1493.

The best-known example of this title is the Catholic Monarchs (Los Reyes Católicos), which is used solely in reference to Isabella I of Castile and Ferdinand II of Aragon.

Neither King Juan Carlos I nor Felipe VI have used the title, but they have not renounced it either.

== Similar titles ==
The monarchs of other countries have received similar titles from the pope:

- Holy Roman Empire: Holy Roman Emperor (Originally awarded as Imperator Romanorum; "Holy" was added in the 13th century) and Defensor Ecclesiae (Protector of the Church, awarded to the Holy Roman Emperor).
- Hungary: Apostolic Majesty (Awarded about 1000.)
- France: Most Christian Majesty (Awarded about 1380.)
- England: Defender of the Faith (Awarded in 1521. Revoked about 1530. Continued to be used by the British monarch.)
- Poland: Orthodox Majesty (awarded in 1661)
- Portugal: Most Faithful Majesty (Awarded 1748.)
- Scotland: Protector and Defender of the Christian Faith and Defender of the Faith (Awarded in 1507 and 1530)
