= Style of the French sovereign =

Titles used by French monarchs

The precise style of French sovereigns varied over the years. Currently, there is no French sovereign; three distinct traditions (the Legitimist, the Orleanist, and the Bonapartist) exist, each claiming different forms of title.

The three styles laid claim to by pretenders to the French throne are:

- Legitimist: "Most high, most potent and most excellent Prince, X, by the Grace of God, King of France and of Navarre, Most Christian Majesty." (Très haut, très puissant et très excellent Prince, X, par la grâce de Dieu, Roi de France et de Navarre, Roi Très-chrétien)
- Orleanist: "X, by the Grace of God and by the constitutional law of the State, King of the French." (X, par la grâce de Dieu et par la loi constitutionnelle de l'État, Roi des Français)
- Bonapartist: "X, By the Grace of God and the Constitutions of the Republic, Emperor of the French." (X, par la grâce de Dieu et les Constitutions de la République, Empereur des Français.)

== Francorum Rex ==
The Latin term Francorum Rex was the official Latin title of the "King of the Franks" after the accession of the Carolingian dynasty (sometimes taking the form of Rex Francorum); this title was used in official documents until French replaced Latin as the formal language of legal documents, and remained used on coins until the 18th century. However, the form Franciae Rex ("King of France") was also used as early as the reign of Philip II Augustus in the 12th century.

== Most Christian King ==
This title Rex Christianissimus, or Roi Très-chrétien owed its origins to the long, and distinctive, relationship between the Catholic Church and the Franks. France was the first modern state recognised by the Church, and was known as the 'Eldest Daughter of the Church'; Clovis I, the king of the Franks, had been recognised by the papacy as a protector of Rome's interests. Accordingly, this title was frequently accorded to the French kings (although on a number of occasions kings of other realms would be addressed as such by the Church), and came into frequent use during the reign of Charles VI; under his son, Charles VII, it became recognised as a hereditary and exclusive title of the kings of France. Pope Julius II, allied between 1510 and 1513 with Henry VIII of England against Louis XII of France, considered transferring the title from the French monarch to the English monarch, drafting a papal brief to this effect; however, it was never issued. French kings thus continued to use the title, in particular on diplomatic documents, less frequently in France itself or in everyday parlance.

The use of the title rex christianissimus to refer to the French king was affirmed by medieval French thinkers including Jean Gerson and Nicole Oresme. Both of these men wrote about what they viewed as their king's unique position among the monarchs of Christendom. These philosophers believed that because he was rex christianissimus, the French king played a special role as protector of the Church.

== King of the French ==
With the French Revolution came the writing of a Constitution for France. As part of the reforms, the monarch ceased to be an absolute ruler of hereditary lands deriving power from God; instead, he became a constitutional ruler ruling by the will of the French people and for the good of the French people. By a decree on 12 October 1789, the king's title was thus changed from "By the Grace of God, King of France and Navarre" to "By the Grace of God and by the constitutional law of the State, King of the French" (French: Par la grâce de Dieu et par la loi constitutionnelle de l'État, Roi des Français), becoming official with the institution of the new constitution on 1 October 1791. The monarchy was abolished a year later, while the Bourbon supporters supporting Louis XVI, and then Louis XVII and Louis XVIII, as King of France and Navarre rather than King of the French, under which title the Bourbons were restored in 1815. However, the constitutional monarchy was revived in 1830, with the Bourbon deposition. Although the Orleanist constitutional monarchy, the so-called "July Monarchy", was abolished in 1848, the heirs of Louis-Philippe continued to claim the title and legacy.

== Emperor of the French ==
The Bonapartist legacy, the title was instituted in 1804 by Napoleon Bonaparte, who crowned himself emperor. It is the title to which the Bonapartists and their supporters continue to lay claim.

== Distinct titles ==
In addition to the titles above, the kings of France at one point or another held others attached to the Crown.

=== Brittany ===
During the Middle Ages, the kings of France considered that the Duchy of Brittany was feudally a part of their Kingdom of France (i.e. it was within the traditional borders of the realm, and the king of France was deemed to be overlord of the Duchy). In fact, however, the Duchy of Brittany was a largely independent sovereign state. It was recognized as independently sovereign and lying outside the Kingdom of France by Louis IV, an ally of Alan II, Duke of Brittany. Subsequent kings of France sought to control Brittany in part because of the attempts of kings of England and Spain to control the duchy.

The independent sovereign nature of the duchy began to come to an end upon the death of Francis II of Brittany. The duchy was inherited by his daughter, Anne, but King Charles VIII of France was determined to bring the territory under royal control. Charles had her marriage annulled and then forced her to marry him in a series of actions that were acknowledged by the Pope. As a result, the Kingdom of France and the Duchy of Brittany were placed in the personal union of their marriage, and the king of France would also hold the title of Duke of Brittany jure uxoris. During their marriage, Charles VIII prohibited Anne from using the title Duchess of Brittany and imposed a royal governor from the House of Penthievre on the duchy.

Legally, however, the duchy remained separate from France proper; the two titles were linked only by the marriage of the king and queen, and in 1498 when Charles VIII died childless, the title Duke of Brittany remained with Anne, rather than passing to the heir of France, Louis XII. Anne of Brittany returned to Brittany and began to re-establish an independent sovereign rule.

However, the new French king, Louis XII married Anne himself, and so the king was once more Duke of Brittany jure uxoris. Legally, Brittany still remained distinct, and its future remained dependent on the ducal bloodline, now held by the House of Montfort. When Anne died, Brittany passed to her daughter and heiress, Claude, rather than remaining with the king of France, her father.

Claude married the future king Francis I. By this marriage, and through the succession to the French crown, the king of France became Duke of Brittany jure uxoris once more.

Claude's death in 1524 separated the duchy from the crown once more, and ultimately, for the final time. Because Claude, like her mother, was sovereign Duchess, the title of 'Duke' did not remain with her husband, but instead passed to her son, Francis III of Brittany, who was also Dauphin of France. Legally, the Crown and duchy were again separate, but the Duke was a child, and the duchy had been governed as an integral part of France for years; the king had little trouble in maintaining royal control over the duchy. Breton independence was effectively ended when in 1532 the Estates of Brittany proclaimed the perpetual union of Brittany with the French crown. Legally, the duchy was now part of France.

Francis III remained Duke of Brittany but died without attaining the French crown in 1536. He was succeeded by his brother, the future Henry II of France. Henry was the French king to become Duke of Brittany in his own right. Any trace of Breton independence ended with the ascension of Henry to the French throne in 1547. The kingdom and duchy were now united by inheritance, and the merging of Brittany into France was thus completed. Notably, when Henry III (the last direct male from Claude of France) died, Brittany passed as part of the Crown to the next heir of France, Henry IV, rather than to Claude's most senior heirs (either Henry II, Duke of Lorraine or Infanta Isabella Clara Eugenia of Spain).

The title Duke of Brittany largely ceased to be used as a title of the king of France after the death of Claude of France. When it appeared, the title was bestowed by the king of France to one of his direct descendants and was in any event titular in status.

(See Duchy of Brittany.)

=== The Navarrese inheritance ===
Navarre was twice united with France: from 1314 to 1328 (effectively from 1284, upon the marriage of Philip IV of France to Joan I of Navarre), and from 1589 to the present.

In the first case, the union was merely that of the two crowns: although the relevant kings held both titles, the two kingdoms were legally distinct, bound only by the descent of the kings from the marriage between Joan and Philip. Accordingly, when their direct male descent died out, the two domains separated, France passing to Philip's nephew, Philip of Valois, and Navarre being inherited by the granddaughter (and senior heiress) of Joan and Philip, Joan II of Navarre. However, Joan's possessions within France, inherited from her forebears the Counts of Champagne, did not pass with Navarre to Joan's heirs; instead, by treaty, Joan exchanged them for other lands within France, Philip then merging the Champenois inheritance into the French crown.

By chance, France and Navarre were united again in 1589, in the person of Henry IV of France: his mother, Jeanne III of Navarre, had been the queen of Navarre (and senior heiress of Joan II), his father, Antoine de Bourbon, had been the senior-most heir after the House of Valois. He thus became 'King of France and Navarre'. He was also, by inheritance, a holder of other significant lands within France: Béarn, Donnezan and Andorra, which were, although a part of the feudal boundaries of France, independent sovereignties; and, under crown jurisdiction, the duchies of Albret, Beaumont, Vendôme, and the counties of Foix, Armagnac, Comminges, Bigorre and Marle.

By established tradition, lands within the legal borders of France (thus, Henry's duchies and counties) would merge into the crown when the holder became king; independent lordships, whether they were or were not part of France's feudal borders, would remain distinct possessions. Henry, however, refused to follow this tradition: having no legitimate sons to pass his possessions onto, and forced to fight to secure his rule over France, he wanted to ensure that if he died without legitimate children, in the ensuing division of his inheritance, his sister Catherine would receive all of their parental inheritance (if he allowed his French lands to merge with the crown before dying without legitimate children, the merged lands would go as part of the crown to the next heir to the throne, his cousin Henri, Prince of Condé). Accordingly, by letters patent of 13 April 1590, he declared that his personal estates would remain separate from the crown, and not subject to Salic law; in Letters of 21 December 1596, he further stated that "our ancient domain, in our kingdom of Navarre and sovereign land of Béarn and Donazan, low countries of Flanders, as well as our duchies, counties, viscounties, lands, lordships in this our kingdom, be and remained disunited, disjoint and separate of our house of France not to be in any way included or merged unless it is by us otherwise ordered, or unless God bestows on us the grace of having children we desire to provide thereto." The Paris Parlement refused to register these Letters, stating that French public law did not allow the division of a monarch's public and private possessions; instead, Henry had them registered at the Parlements of Bordeaux and Toulouse. Thus, from 1589 to 1607, the King of France and Navarre was also the Lord of Béarn, Duke of Albret and Vendôme, Count of Foix, etc.

These acts were reversed in 1606–1607: Henry had a legitimate son, and the death of his sister without issue had nullified any need to share the Navarrese inheritance. By an Edict of 1607, the original ruling of the Paris Parlement that lands within France were automatically merged in the Crown was upheld, and the king ceased to be Duke of Albret and Vendôme, Count of Foix, etc. Because Navarre, Béarn, Andorre and Donazan were independent of France, however, the king remained separately the King of Navarre, and Lord of the other domains.

In October 1620, the merging of the Navarrese inheritance into France was furthered, when Louis XIII on 20 October had an Edict passed in Pau by the Sovereign Council of Navarre, to prevent "the misfortunes and inconveniences which would occur if, failing a male heir to our Royal House, said countries passed by inheritance to Foreign princes, thereby opening a door to enter into our Kingdom". By this "perpetual and irrevocable Edict", Navarre, Béarn, Andorra and Donezan were united and incorporated into the crown of France: although, as in the case of Scotland and England in 1707, whilst the Navarrese domains were politically and monarchically united with France, they retained their separate institutions—thus, they were bound irrevocably to France, but not merged into it. Unlike the British Act of Union, however, Navarre lost its independent judiciary, a fact the Navarrese resented for a long time afterwards. Nonetheless, in recognition of the separate nature of the Kingdom of Navarre (and the lordships of Béarn, Andorra and Donezan, which were considered attached to the Crown of Navarre), the Bourbon kings of France customarily used the title 'King of France and Navarre'.

In the troubles of 1789, Navarre—being a distinct kingdom—by order of the Navarrese estates refused to elect representatives to the Estates General of France, instead sending four representatives of the Estates to Versailles at the 'invitation' of the king; these representatives, arriving in July 1789, refused to sit with the National Assembly, and instead the Navarrese estates attempted to revoke the 1620 Union. This was denied, and by vote of the assembly the king's title was changed from 'King of France and Navarre' to 'King of the French' (thus denying the separation between the two kingdoms, and emphasising the—presumed—unity of the French people). By the constitution of 1791, this change was effected, and the merging of Navarre was completed—it lost all of its separate institutions, and was denied any recognition as a state separate from the French nation. Although the last Bourbons titled themselves 'King of France and Navarre' once more, it was a title only, 'Navarre' having ceased to exist as anything more than a name.

=== Other examples ===
The king of France was also at times ruler of lands outside France itself. If he would not or could not merge these lands into the French crown, and thus the French state, he would legally be sovereign of those lands separately to his role as French king. In such cases, the king's styles would be treated differently in the relevant territory. However, the title would be used only within the territory, or in documents relating to the territory; it would not be formally used as part of the king's title outside the relevant lands.

- The Dauphiné: the area had been ceded to the king of France by the last Dauphin de Viennois in 1349, on the condition that the land and title always be used by the king's eldest son; because the territory was legally part of the Holy Roman Empire, rather than of France, the emperors legally forbade the region to be united with France. Nonetheless, when there was no Dauphin of France, the king would be personally sovereign over the Dauphiné. His title there, when there was no Dauphin of France, was par la grâce de Dieu roi de France, dauphin de Viennois, comte de Valentinois et de Diois ("By the Grace of God King of France, Dauphin of Viennois, Count of Valentinois and of Diois").
- Provence: The territory was ceded to Louis XI by Margaret of Anjou, the heiress, on 19 October 1480, and united to the crown in the following year; however, the Union was legally reversed by the 1486 Edict of Union, which stipulated that Provence and its accompanying territories would "in no way be subordinated to the crown or realm of France". Accordingly, the king of France was titled in relation to Provence, par la grâce de Dieu roi de France, comte de Provence, Forcalquier et terres adjacentes ("By the Grace of God King of France, Count of Provence, Forcalquier and the lands adjacent.")
- Charles VIII used the title "King of Naples and Jerusalem" in relation to the Kingdom of Naples; his successor, Louis XII, titled himself Ludovicus Dei Gratia Francorum Neapolis et Hierusalem Rex Dux Mediolani ("Louis, By the Grace of God King of the Franks, of Naples and of Jerusalem, Duke of Milan"). He abandoned it by the treaty of Blois of 22 Oct 1505.
- Francis I used the title roi de France, duc de Milan, comte d'Asti, seigneur de Gênes ("King of France, Duke of Milan, Count of Asti, Lord of Genoa") in relation to the Duchy of Milan.
- In January 1641, Louis XIII was chosen by the Catalans as 'Count of Barcelona, Roussillon, and Cerdagne'; accordingly, official documents relating to the area between 1641 and 1652 described the king as Dei gratia Galliarum et Navarrae Rex, comes Barcinonae, Rossilionis et Ceritaniae ("By the Grace of God King of the Gauls and Navarra, Count of Barcelona, Roussillon and Cerdagne"). Roussillon and Cerdagne were later ceded to France by Spain, but were merged directly into the crown.

In addition, Alsace requested that the king take the title "Landgrave of Upper and Lower Alsace" (German: Landgraf von Oberelsaß und Unterelsaß) in relation to the territory, but this did not happen.

== List of changes to the royal style ==
Monarchs with disputed legitimacy are labeled in parentheses.

| Period | Style | Used by |
|---|---|---|
| 987–1031 | By the Grace of God, King of the Franks | Hugh Capet, Robert II |
| 1031–1032 | By the Grace of God, King of the Franks, Duke of Burgundy | Henry I |
| 1032–1137 | By the Grace of God, King of the Franks | Henry I, Philip I, Louis VI |
| 1137–1152 | By the Grace of God, King of the Franks and Duke of the Aquitanians, Count of the Poitevins | Louis VII |
| 1152–1180 | By the Grace of God, King of the Franks | Louis VII |
| 1180–1190 | By the Grace of God, King of the Franks, Count of Artois | Philip II |
| 1190–1223 | By the Grace of God, King of France | Philip II |
| 1223–1237 | By the Grace of God, King of France, Count of Artois | Louis VIII, Louis IX |
| 1237–1285 | By the Grace of God, King of France | Louis IX, Philip III |
| 1285–1305 | By the Grace of God, King of France and Navarre, Count of Champagne | Philip IV |
| 1305–1314 | By the Grace of God, King of France | Philip IV |
| 1314–1316 | By the Grace of God, King of France and Navarre, Count of Champagne | Louis X, John I |
| 1316–1322 | By the Grace of God, King of France and Navarre, Count of Champagne and Burgundy | Philip V |
| 1322–1328 | By the Grace of God, King of France and Navarre, Count of Champagne | Charles IV |
| 1328–1350 | By the Grace of God, King of France | Philip VI |
| 1350–1360 | By the Grace of God, King of France, Count of Auvergne and Boulogne | John II |
| 1360–1361 | By the Grace of God, King of France | John II |
| 1361–1363 | By the Grace of God, King of France, Duke of Burgundy | John II |
| 1363–1364 | By the Grace of God, King of France | John II |
| 1364–1422 | By the Grace of God, King of France; Dauphin of Viennois, Count of Valentinois and of Diois* | Charles V, Charles VI |
| 1422–1486 | By the Grace of God, Most Christian King of France; Dauphin of Viennois, Count of Valentinois and of Diois | Charles VII, Louis XI, Charles VIII |
| 1486–1491 | By the Grace of God, Most Christian King of France; Count of Provence, Forcalquier and the lands adjacent; Dauphin of Viennois, Count of Valentinois and of Diois | Charles VIII |
| 1491–1495 | By the Grace of God, Most Christian King of France, Duke of Brittany; Count of Provence, Forcalquier and the lands adjacent; Dauphin of Viennois, Count of Valentinois and of Diois | Charles VIII |
| February–July 1495 | By the Grace of God, Most Christian King of France, Naples and Jerusalem, Duke of Brittany; Count of Provence, Forcalquier and the lands adjacent** | Charles VIII |
| 1495–1498 | By the Grace of God, Most Christian King of France, Duke of Brittany; Count of Provence, Forcalquier and the lands adjacent; Dauphin of Viennois, Count of Valentinois and of Diois | Charles VIII |
| April 1498—1499 | By the Grace of God, Most Christian King of France; Count of Provence, Forcalquier and the lands adjacent; Dauphin of Viennois, Count of Valentinois and of Diois | Louis XII |
| 1499–1505 | By the Grace of God, Most Christian King of France, Duke of Brittany; King of Naples and Jerusalem, Duke of Milan; Count of Provence, Forcalquier and the lands adjacent; Dauphin of Viennois, Count of Valentinois and of Diois | Louis XII |
| 1505–1512 | By the Grace of God, Most Christian King of France, Duke of Brittany; Duke of Milan; Count of Provence, Forcalquier and the lands adjacent; Dauphin of Viennois, Count of Valentinois and of Diois | Louis XII |
| 1512–1514 | By the Grace of God, Most Christian King of France, Duke of Brittany; Count of Provence, Forcalquier and the lands adjacent; Dauphin of Viennois, Count of Valentinois and of Diois | Louis XII |
| 1514–1515 | By the Grace of God, Most Christian King of France; Count of Provence, Forcalquier and the lands adjacent; Dauphin of Viennois, Count of Valentinois and of Diois | Louis XII |
| 1515–1521 | By the Grace of God, Most Christian King of France, Duke of Brittany; Duke of Milan, Count of Asti, Lord of Genoa; Count of Provence, Forcalquier and the lands adjacent; Dauphin of Viennois, Count of Valentinois and of Diois | Francis I |
| 1521–1524 | By the Grace of God, Most Christian King of France, Duke of Brittany; Count of Provence, Forcalquier and the lands adjacent** | Francis I |
| 1524–1559 | By the Grace of God, Most Christian King of France; Count of Provence, Forcalquier and the lands adjacent** | Francis I, Henry II |
| 1559–1560 | By the Grace of God, Most Christian King of France and Scotland; Count of Provence, Forcalquier and the lands adjacent; Dauphin of Viennois, Count of Valentinois and of Diois | Francis II |
| 1560–1589 | By the Grace of God, Most Christian King of France; Count of Provence, Forcalquier and the lands adjacent; Dauphin of Viennois, Count of Valentinois and of Diois | Charles IX, Henry III |
| 1589–1607 | By the Grace of God, Most Christian King of France and Navarre, co-Prince of Andorra, Duke of Albret, Bourbon, Beaumont and Vendôme, Count of Foix, Armagnac, Comminges, Bigorre and Marle, Lord of Béarn, and Donezan; Count of Provence, Forcalquier and the lands adjacent; Dauphin of Viennois, Count of Valentinois and of Diois | Henry IV |
| 1607–1620 | By the Grace of God, Most Christian King of France and Navarre, co-Prince of Andorra, Lord of Béarn, and Donezan; Count of Provence, Forcalquier and the lands adjacent; Dauphin of Viennois, Count of Valentinois and of Diois | Henry IV, Louis XIII |
| 1620–1641 | By the Grace of God, Most Christian King of France and Navarre; Count of Provence, Forcalquier and the lands adjacent; Dauphin of Viennois, Count of Valentinois and of Diois | Louis XIII |
| 1641–1652 | By the Grace of God, Most Christian King of France and Navarre; Count of Barcelona, Roussillon and Cerdagne; Count of Provence, Forcalquier and the lands adjacent; Dauphin of Viennois, Count of Valentinois and of Diois | Louis XIII, Louis XIV |
| 1652–1791 | By the Grace of God, Most Christian King of France and Navarre; Count of Provence, Forcalquier and the lands adjacent; Dauphin of Viennois, Count of Valentinois and of Diois | Louis XIV, Louis XV, Louis XVI |
| 1791–1814 | By the Grace of God, Most Christian King of France and Navarre | Louis XVI, (Louis XVII), Louis XVIII |
| 1791–1792 | By the Grace of God and by the Constitutional Law of the State, King of the French | Louis XVI |
| 1804–1805 | By the Grace of God and the Constitutions of the Republic, Emperor of the French (Napoléon, par la grâce de Dieu et les Constitutions de la République, Empereur des Français) | Napoleon I |
| 1805–1806 | By the Grace of God and the Constitutions of the Republic, Emperor of the French, King of Italy (Napoléon, par la grâce de Dieu et les Constitutions de la République, Empereur des Français, Roi d'Italie) | Napoleon I |
| 1806–1809 | By the Grace of God and the Constitutions of the Republic, Emperor of the French, King of Italy, Protector of the Confederation of the Rhine (Napoléon, par la grâce de Dieu et les Constitutions de la République, Empereur des Français, Roi d'Italie, Protecteur de la Confédération du Rhin) | Napoleon I |
| 1809–1814 | By the Grace of God and the Constitutions of the Republic, Emperor of the. French, King of Italy, Protector of the Confederation of the Rhine, Mediator of the Helvetic Confederation (Napoléon, par la grâce de Dieu et les Constitutions de la République, Empereur des Français, Roi d'Italie, Protecteur de la Confédération du Rhin, Médiateur de la Confédération Helvétique) | Napoleon I |
| 1814–1815 | By the Grace of God, Most Christian King of France and Navarre | Louis XVIII |
| March–June 1815 | By the Grace of God and the Constitutions of the Republic, Emperor of the French | Napoleon I, (Napoleon II) |
| 1815–1830 | By the Grace of God, Most Christian King of France and Navarre | Louis XVIII, Charles X, (Louis XIX), (Henry V) |
| 1830–1848 | By the Grace of God and by the Constitutional Law of the State, King of the French | Louis-Philippe I, (Louis-Philippe II) |
| 1852–1870 | By the Grace of God and the will of the Nation, Emperor of the French | Napoleon III |

== Similar titles ==
The monarchs of other countries have received similar titles from the pope:

- England: Defender of the Faith (awarded in 1521 and revoked again c. 1530 by the Pope. Granted again in 1543 by the Parliament of England.)
- Germany: Defensor Ecclesiae (Protector of the Church; awarded to Holy Roman Emperors)
- Hungary: Apostolic Majesty (awarded c. 1000)
- Portugal: Most Faithful Majesty (awarded in 1748)
- Spain: Most Catholic Majesty (awarded in 1493)
- Venice: Most Serene Republic

== Sources ==
The French Royal Family: Titles and Customs
