= Catherine the Great =

Empress of Russia from 1762 to 1796

- Tsarina
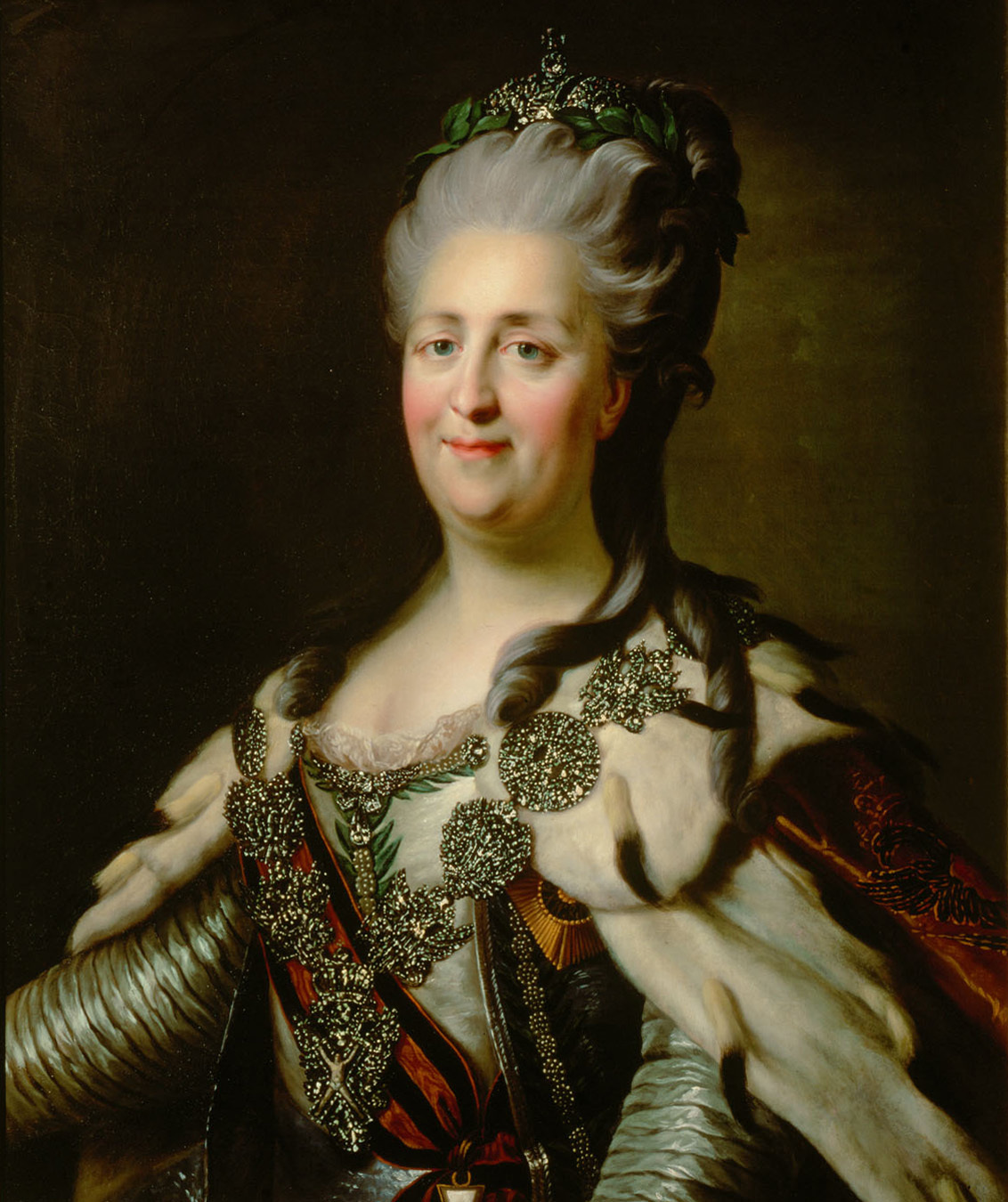
- Portrait, 1780s

Empress of Russia
- Reign: 9 July 1762 – 17 November 1796
- Coronation: 22 September 1762
- Predecessor: Peter III
- Successor: Paul I

Empress consort of Russia
- Tenure: 5 January 1762 – 9 July 1762
- Born: Princess Sophia Augusta Frederica of Anhalt-Zerbst; 2 May 1729; Stettin, Prussia
- Died: 17 November 1796 (aged 67); Winter Palace, Saint Petersburg, Russia
- Burial: Saints Peter and Paul Cathedral, Saint Petersburg
- Spouse: Peter III of Russia (m. 1745; died 1762)
- Issue among others: Paul I; Alexei, Count Bobrinsky; (illegitimate)
Names
- German: Sophie Auguste Friederike; Russian: Екатерина Алексеевна Романова, romanized: Yekaterina Alekseyevna Romanova; English: Catherine Alexeievna Romanova
Regnal name
- Catherine II
- House: Ascania (by birth); Holstein-Gottorp-Romanov (by marriage)
- Father: Christian August, Prince of Anhalt-Zerbst
- Mother: Joanna Elisabeth of Holstein-Gottorp
- Religion: Lutheranism (1729–1745); Eastern Orthodoxy (1745–1796)

Catherine II (Note: Russian: Екатери́на II Алексе́евна, romanized: Yekaterina II Alekseyevna) (born Sophie Auguste Friederike von Anhalt-Zerbst; 2 May 1729 – 17 November 1796), known as Catherine the Great, (Note: Russian: Екатери́на Вели́кая, romanized: Yekaterina Velikaya) was Empress of Russia from 9 July 1762 until her death in 1796. Before her accession, Catherine had been a royal consort as the wife of Emperor Peter III, whom she overthrew in a coup d'état. Her reign of over 34 years saw an era of prosperity during the Enlightenment in which many new cities, universities and theatres were established; large-scale immigration from the rest of Europe occurred; and the Russian Empire was recognised as a great power of Europe.

Born a Prussian princess, Catherine married Peter, a grandson of Peter the Great, at the age of 16. Peter became Emperor of Russia in 1762, reigning for seven months before his deposition and possible assassination at the hands of Catherine. During her reign, she often maintained close alliances with noble favourites such as Count Grigory Orlov and Grigory Potemkin. She appointed and worked with several highly successful generals such as Alexander Suvorov and Pyotr Rumyantsev and admirals such as Samuel Greig and Fyodor Ushakov. She governed at a time when the Russian Empire was expanding rapidly by conquest and diplomacy. In the west, she installed her former lover to the throne of Poland, which was eventually partitioned. In the south, the Crimean Khanate was annexed following victories over the Bar Confederation and the Ottoman Empire in the Russo-Turkish War. With the support of Great Britain, Russia colonised the territories of New Russia along the coasts of the Black and Azov seas. In the east, Russians became the first Europeans to colonise Alaska, establishing Russian America.

Many cities and towns were founded on Catherine's orders in the newly conquered lands, most notably Yekaterinoslav, Kherson, Nikolayev, and Sevastopol. An admirer of Peter the Great, Catherine continued to modernise Russia along Western European culture. However, military conscription and the economy continued to depend on serfdom, and the increasing demands of the state and of private landowners intensified the exploitation of serf labour. This was one of the chief reasons behind rebellions, including Pugachev's Rebellion of Cossacks, nomads, peoples of the Volga, and peasants.

The Manifesto on Freedom of the Nobility, issued during the short reign of Peter III and confirmed by Catherine, freed Russian nobles from compulsory military or state service. The construction of many mansions of the nobility in the classical style endorsed by the empress changed the face of the country. She is often included in the ranks of the enlightened despots. (Note: "Despot" is not derogatory in this context.) Catherine presided over the age of the Russian Enlightenment and established the Smolny Institute of Noble Maidens, the first state-financed higher education institution for women in Europe. Her reign promoted the institutionalisation of provincial administration, and the development of public education, including the establishment a state-organised school system.

Catherine was the first Russian ruler to bring the abolition of serfdom into public debate and enacted measures restricting the expansion of serf status, leaving birth and the granting of state peasants to private landowners as its two remaining legal sources.Catherine supported the Free Economic Society and the spread of potato cultivation, established foundling homes and widows' annuity arrangements, and introduced provincial public welfare institutions. She also promoted smallpox inoculation, undergoing the procedure herself in 1768.

In 1783, Catherine appointed Princess Yekaterina Dashkova director of the Saint Petersburg Academy of Sciences, making her the first woman to head a national academy of sciences. Together, they established the Russian Academy, dedicated to the study of the Russian language and literature, with Dashkova as its first president. In 1795, Catherine founded the Imperial Public Library, Russia's first state public library, which opened to the public in 1814.

== Early life ==
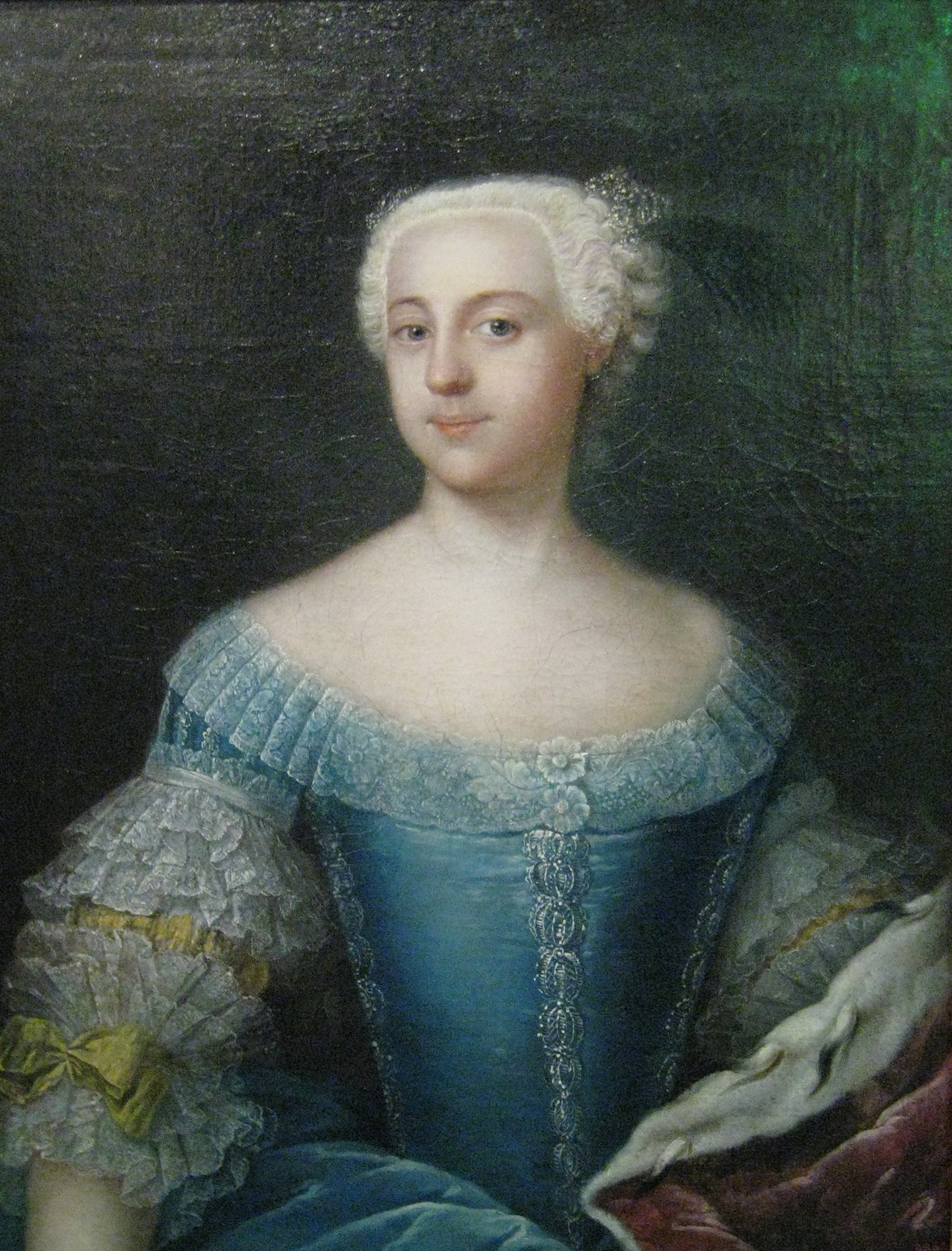
Catherine in her childhood, by Anna Rosina de Gasc, 1742

Catherine was born on 2 May 1729 as Princess Sophie Auguste Friederike von Anhalt-Zerbst-Dornburg, in the city of Stettin (now known as Szczecin) within the Province of Pomerania in the Kingdom of Prussia. She was delivered in her family's residence in the neoclassical building at the current 1 Farna Street (then Große Domstraße 1), where she resided for the first few years of her life, before her family moved to the Ducal Castle in Stettin. Her mother was Joanna Elisabeth of Holstein-Gottorp. Her father, Christian August, Prince of Anhalt-Zerbst, belonged to the ruling German family of Anhalt. He failed to become the Duke of Courland and Semigallia and, at the time of his daughter's birth, he held the rank of a Prussian general in his capacity as governor of the city of Stettin. However, because her second cousin Charles Peter Ulrich converted to Eastern Orthodox Christianity, her mother's brother, Adolf Frederick, became the heir to the Swedish throne and two of her first cousins, Gustav III and Charles XIII, became Kings of Sweden.

In accordance with the prevailing custom among the ruling dynasties of Germany, she received her education chiefly from a French governess and from tutors. According to her memoirs, Sophie was considered a tomboy and trained herself to master a sword.

Sophie found her childhood to be uneventful; she once wrote to her correspondent Baron Grimm, "I see nothing of interest in it". Although Sophie was born a princess, her family had little money; her rise to power was supported by her mother Joanna's wealthy relatives, who were both nobles and royal relations. The more than 300 sovereign entities of the Holy Roman Empire, many of them small and powerless, made for a highly competitive political system in which the various princely families competed for advantages over one another, often by way of political marriages.

For smaller German princely families, an advantageous marriage was one of the best means of advancing their interests. To improve the position of her house, Sophie was groomed throughout her childhood to become the wife of a powerful ruler. In addition to her native German, Sophie became fluent in French, the lingua franca of European elites in the 18th century. The young Sophie received the standard education for an 18th-century German princess, concentrating on etiquette, French, and Lutheran theology.

In 1739, when Sophie was 10, she met her second cousin who would later become her husband and Peter III of Russia. She later wrote that she immediately found Peter detestable and that she stayed at one end of the castle and Peter at the other. She disliked his pale complexion and his fondness for alcohol.

== Marriage and succession ==
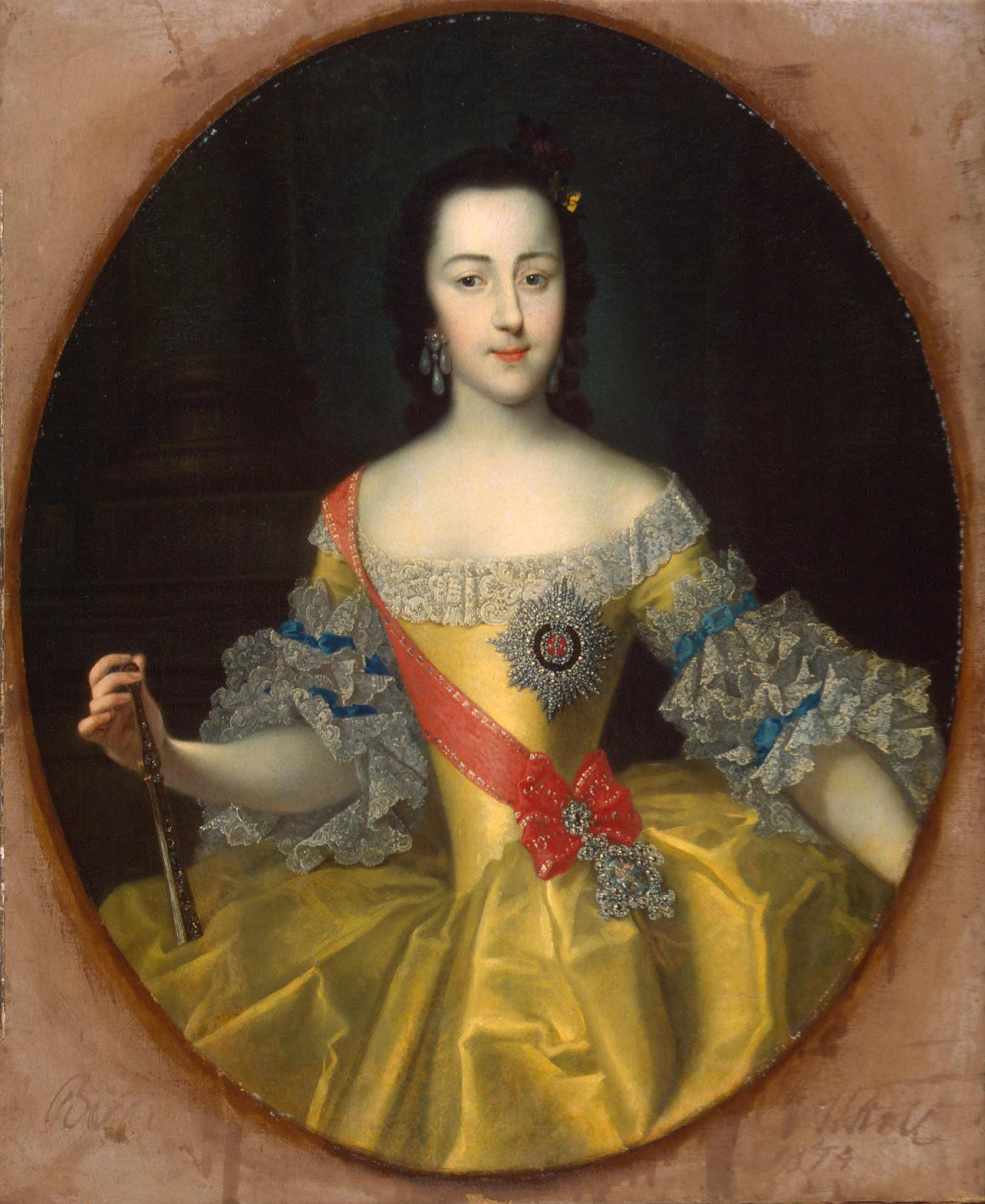
Catherine as Grand Duchess around the time of her marriage (portrait by Georg Christoph Grooth, 1745)

The choice of Sophie as wife of the future emperor was a result of the Lopukhina affair, in which Count Jean Armand de Lestocq and King Frederick the Great of Prussia took an active part. The objective was to strengthen the friendship between Prussia and Russia, to weaken the influence of Austria, and to overthrow the chancellor Alexey Bestuzhev-Ryumin, a known partisan of the Austrian alliance on whom the reigning Russian Empress Elizabeth relied. The diplomatic intrigue failed, largely due to the intervention of Sophie's mother, Joanna Elisabeth.

Contemporary and later accounts present Joanna as a figure of strong will and ambition, often involved in court affairs. Her efforts to secure her daughter’s advantageous marriage in Russia brought her into conflict with Empress Elizabeth, who ultimately expelled her from the country amid allegations of espionage on behalf of King Frederick. Elizabeth knew the family well and had intended to marry Joanna's brother, Charles Augustus (Karl August von Holstein). He died of smallpox in 1727 in Saint Petersburg, just before the wedding could take place. Despite Joanna's interference, Elizabeth took a strong liking to Sophie, and Sophie and Peter were eventually married in 1745.

When Sophie arrived in Russia in 1744 at age 15, she spared no effort to ingratiate herself not only with Elizabeth, but also with Elizabeth's lover Alexei Razumovsky and with the Russian people at large. She zealously applied herself to learning the Russian language, rising late at night to repeat her lessons in her bedroom. She became ill with pneumonia, but survived and recovered. In her memoirs, she wrote that she made the decision then to do whatever was necessary and to profess to believe whatever was required of her to become qualified to wear the crown. Although she was able to learn Russian, she spoke with a heavy accent, and made grammatical errors. In most circumstances Catherine II spoke French in her court. In fact the use of French as the main language of the Russian imperial court continued until 1812, when it became politically incorrect to speak French in court due to the French invasion of Russia.

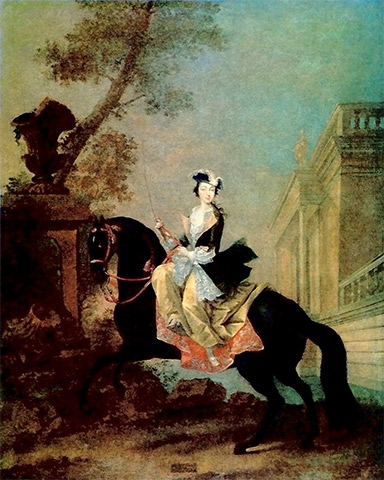
An equestrian portrait of Grand Duchess Ekaterina Alekseyevna from before 1749

Sophie recalled in her memoirs that as soon as she arrived in Russia, she fell ill with a pleuritis that almost killed her. She credited her survival to frequent bloodletting; in a single day, she received four phlebotomies. Her mother's opposition to this practice brought her the Empress's disfavour. When Sophie's situation looked desperate, her mother wanted her confessed by a Lutheran pastor. Awaking from her delirium, however, Sophie said, "I don't want any Lutheran; I want my Orthodox father [clergyman]". This increased her popularity with the Empress and her court as a whole. Elizabeth doted on Sophie and their relationship grew stronger after this.

Sophie's father, a devout German Lutheran, opposed his daughter's conversion to Eastern Orthodoxy. Despite his objections, on 28 June 1744, the Russian Orthodox Church received Sophie as a member. It was then that she took the baptismal name Catherine (Yekaterina or Ekaterina) and the (artificial) patronymic Алексеевна (Alekseyevna, daughter of Aleksey), so that she was in all respects the namesake of Catherine I, the mother of Elizabeth and the grandmother of Peter III. The following year, on 21 August 1745, the long-planned dynastic marriage between Catherine and Peter finally took place in the Cathedral of Our Lady of Kazan, Saint Petersburg. Catherine had recently turned 16. Her father did not travel to Russia for the wedding.

The bridegroom, then known as Peter von Holstein-Gottorp, had become Duke of Holstein-Gottorp (located in the north-west of present-day Germany near the border with Denmark) in 1739. The newlyweds settled in the palace of Oranienbaum, which remained the residence of the "young court" for many years. From there, they governed the small duchy to obtain experience to govern Russia. Although Peter had encouraged Catherine to handle affairs concerning his hereditary duchy, Elizabeth disapproved of her involvement. During the political crisis of 1758, Peter sided with his aunt and withdrew his support for Catherine's administrative role, effectively ending her participation in the government of Holstein-Gottorp.

Although Catherine had initially gained Elizabeth's favour and continued to cultivate her goodwill, her position at the Russian court became increasingly constrained after her marriage. In May 1746, Elizabeth appointed Maria Choglokova to supervise the grand duchess and instructed Chancellor Alexey Bestuzhev-Ryumin to prepare regulations for the young imperial couple. Historian Oleg Ivanov argues that Bestuzhev's extensive draft instructions of 1746 were not formally approved. Nevertheless, an order dated 12 April 1747 established specific restrictions on Catherine's household: courtiers required Choglokova's permission to enter the grand duchess's rooms, requests addressed to Elizabeth were to be conveyed through Choglokova, and the latter was required to report conduct contrary to the empress's wishes.

According to Dixon, Catherine also needed Elizabeth's permission whenever she wished to leave the palace. By autumn 1747, the Choglokovs had restricted access to the young couple so severely that Dixon compared their circumstances to virtual house arrest. Catherine's mourning following her father's death in 1747 was curtailed, and Elizabeth personally confronted her over suspicions of infidelity. The restrictions varied over time: Catherine recalled the winter of 1746–1747 as a particularly happy period, while her relationship with the Choglokovs subsequently improved.

Elizabeth also exercised considerable control over the upbringing of Catherine's children. Following the birth of Paul in 1754, the infant was placed in Elizabeth's care, and Catherine had seen him on only three occasions by the following Easter. Elizabeth continued to direct much of Paul's upbringing throughout the remainder of her reign. When Catherine gave birth to her daughter Anna in 1757, Elizabeth chose the child's name despite Catherine's request to do so herself; Anna was likewise placed in the care of the empress's wet nurses.

Despite these restrictions, Catherine gradually acquired political allies. Bestuzhev, who had previously obstructed her correspondence with her mother, became one of her supporters after the diplomatic realignment of 1756 and helped restore that correspondence. His arrest in February 1758 exposed Catherine to renewed political scrutiny and questioning over her correspondence with Russian military commanders.

Catherine's memoirs describe both conflicts and moments of cordiality with Elizabeth. As discussed by the editors Mark Cruse and Hilde Hoogenboom, Catherine recorded exchanges of compliments between the two women, including her own praise of Elizabeth's appearance.

Elizabeth had ordered the arrest and disgrace of Catherine's political ally Alexey Bestuzhev-Ryumin in 1758. Nevertheless, when Catherine rehabilitated him following her accession, she also explicitly defended the late empress's reputation. In her manifesto of 31 August 1762 (Old Style), Catherine described Elizabeth as an enlightened, merciful and just monarch and presented Bestuzhev's prosecution as having proceeded contrary to Elizabeth's wishes. The manifesto expressly stated that his rehabilitation was undertaken in defence of Elizabeth's "name and virtues". Historian Sergey Solovyov observed that clearing Bestuzhev's name created a political difficulty because it could imply criticism of Elizabeth, whose reputation Catherine's manifesto sought to preserve.

Catherine also retained Nikita Ivanovich Panin as tutor and chief supervisor of her son Paul after becoming empress. Panin had originally been appointed to the position by Elizabeth in 1760.

In all other aspects, the marriage proved unsuccessful; it remained unconsummated for years due to Peter III's mental immaturity. After Peter took a mistress, Catherine became involved with other prominent court figures. She soon became popular with several powerful political groups that opposed her husband. Unhappy with her marriage, Catherine became an avid reader of books, mostly in French. She disparaged her husband for his devotion to reading on the one hand "Lutheran prayer-books, the other the history of and trial of some highway robbers who had been hanged or broken on the wheel".

It was during this period that she first read Voltaire and the other philosophes of the French Enlightenment. As she learned Russian, she became increasingly interested in the literature of her adopted country. Some years later, in 1754, Catherine read the Annals by Tacitus, which caused what she called a "revolution" in her mind as Tacitus was the first intellectual she read who understood power politics as they are, not as they should be. She was especially impressed with his argument that people do not act for their professed idealistic reasons, and instead she learned to look for the "hidden and interested motives".

According to Alexander Herzen, who edited a version of Catherine's memoirs, Catherine had her first sexual relationship with Sergei Saltykov while living at Oranienbaum, as her marriage to Peter had not yet been consummated, as Catherine later claimed. Nonetheless, Catherine would eventually leave the final version of her memoirs to her son, the future Paul I, in which she explained why Paul had been Peter's son. Saltykov was used to make Peter jealous, and she did not desire to have a child with him; Catherine wanted to become empress herself, and did not want another heir to the throne; however, Empress Elizabeth allegedly blackmailed Peter and Catherine to produce this heir. Peter and Catherine had both been involved in a 1749 military plot to crown Peter (together with Catherine) in Elizabeth's stead. As a result of this plot, Elizabeth likely wished to deny both Catherine and Peter any rights to the Russian throne. Elizabeth, therefore, allowed Catherine to have sexual lovers only after a new legal heir, Catherine and Peter's son Paul, born in 1754, survived and appeared to be strong.

After this, Catherine carried on sexual liaisons over the years with many men, including Stanislaus Augustus Poniatowski, Grigory Grigoryevich Orlov, Alexander Vasilchikov, Grigory Potemkin, Ivan Rimsky-Korsakov, and others. She became acquainted with Princess Ekaterina Vorontsova-Dashkova, the sister of her husband's official mistress. In Dashkova's opinion, she had introduced Catherine to several powerful political groups that opposed her husband.

Peter III's temperament became quite unbearable for those who resided in the palace. He would announce trying drills in the morning to male servants, who later joined Catherine in her room to sing and dance until late hours.

In 1757, Catherine became pregnant with her second child, Anna, who only lived to 14 months. Due to various rumours of Catherine's promiscuity, Peter was led to believe he was not the child's biological father and is known to have proclaimed, "Go to the devil!" when Catherine angrily dismissed his accusation. She therefore spent much of this time alone in her private boudoir to hide away from Peter's abrasive personality. In the first version of her memoirs, edited and published by Alexander Hertzen, Catherine strongly implied that the real father of her son Paul was not Peter, but rather Saltykov.

Catherine recalled in her memoirs her optimistic and resolute mood before her accession to the throne:

I used to say to myself that happiness and misery depend on ourselves. If you feel unhappy, raise yourself above unhappiness, and so act that your happiness may be independent of all eventualities.

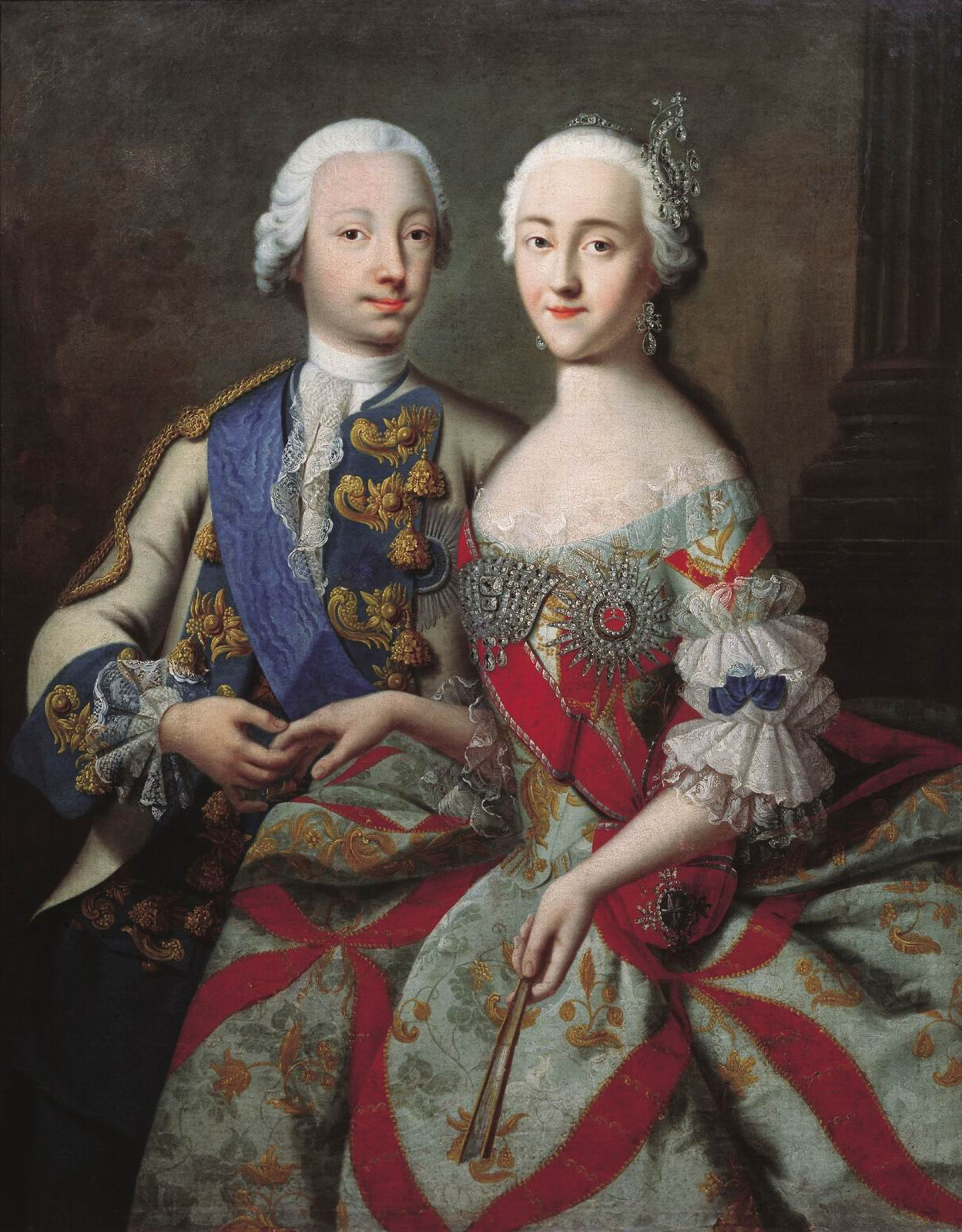
Emperor Peter III and his wife, the future Catherine the Great. He reigned only six months, and died on 17 July 1762.

After the death of the Empress Elizabeth on 5 January 1762 (OS: 25 December 1761), Peter succeeded to the throne as Emperor Peter III and Catherine became his empress. The imperial couple moved into the new Winter Palace in Saint Petersburg. The Emperor's eccentricities and policies, including his great admiration for the Prussian King Frederick II, alienated the same groups that Catherine had cultivated as allies. Russia and Prussia had fought each other during the Seven Years' War (1756–1763) and Russian troops had occupied Berlin in 1761.

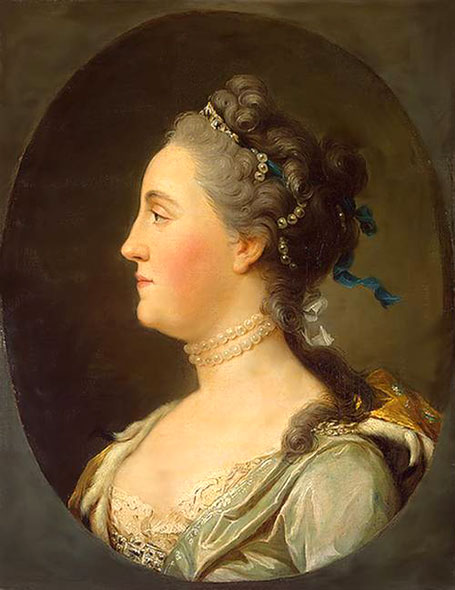
Profile portrait of Grand Duchess Catherine Alexeievna by Vigilius Eriksen, c. 1762

Peter's support for Frederick II eroded much of his support among the nobility. Peter ceased Russian operations against Prussia, and Frederick suggested the partition of Polish territories with Russia. Peter also intervened in a dispute between his Duchy of Holstein and Denmark over the province of Schleswig (see Count Johann Hartwig Ernst von Bernstorff). As Duke of Holstein-Gottorp, Peter planned war against Denmark, Russia's traditional ally against Sweden.

In July 1762, barely six months after becoming emperor, Peter lingered in Oranienbaum with his Holstein-born courtiers and relatives, while Catherine lived in another palace nearby. On the night of 8 July 1762 (OS: 27 June 1762), Catherine was given the news that one of her co-conspirators had been arrested by her estranged husband and that the coup they had been planning would have to take place at once. The next day, she left the palace and departed for the Izmailovsky Regiment, where she delivered a speech asking the soldiers to protect her from her husband. Catherine then left with the Izmailovsky Regiment to go to the Semenovsky Barracks, where the clergy was waiting to ordain her as the sole occupant of the Russian throne and began her reign as Empress of Russia as Catherine II.

She had her husband arrested and forced him to sign a document of abdication, leaving none to dispute her accession to the throne.

On 17 July 1762, eight days after the coup that amazed the outside world and just six months after his accession to the throne, Peter III died at Ropsha, possibly at the hands of Alexei Orlov (younger brother to Grigory Orlov, then a court favourite and a participant in the coup). Peter supposedly was assassinated, but it is unknown how he died. The official cause, after an autopsy, was a severe attack of haemorrhoidal colic and an apoplexy stroke.

At the time of Peter III's overthrow, other potential rivals for the throne included Ivan VI, who had been confined at Schlüsselburg in Lake Ladoga from the age of six months and was thought to have been insane. Ivan was assassinated during an attempt to free him as part of a failed coup against Catherine. Like Elizabeth before her, Catherine had given strict instructions that Ivan was to be killed in the event of any such attempt. The woman later known as Princess Tarakanova was another potential rival.

Catherine succeeded her husband as empress regnant, following the legal precedent of Empress Catherine I, who had succeeded her husband Peter I in 1725. Historians debate Catherine's technical status, whether as a regent or as a usurper, tolerable only during the minority of her son, Grand Duke Paul.

== Reign (1762–1796) ==
=== Coronation (1762) ===
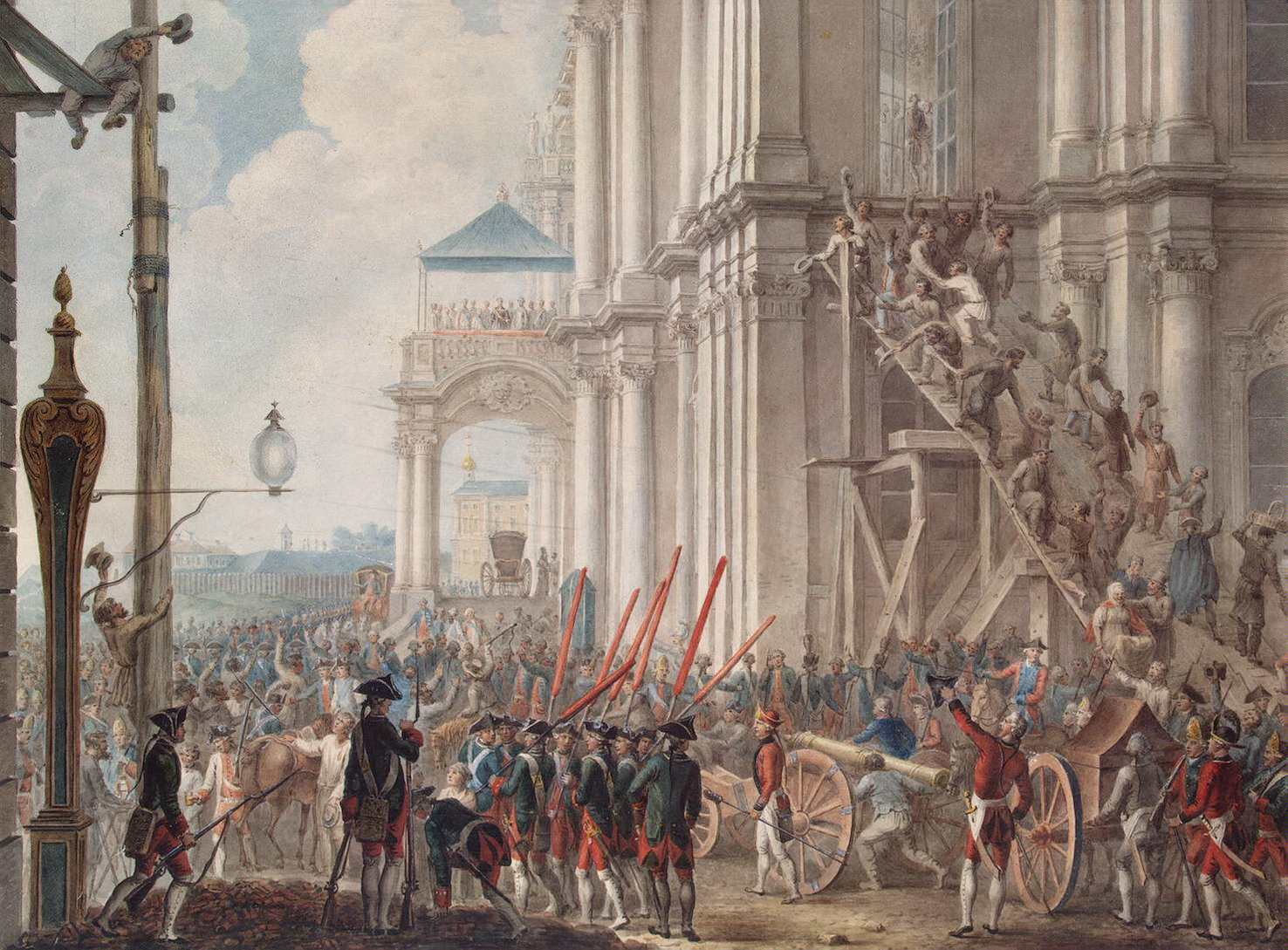
Catherine II on a balcony of the Winter Palace on 9 July [O.S. 28 June] 1762, the day of the coup

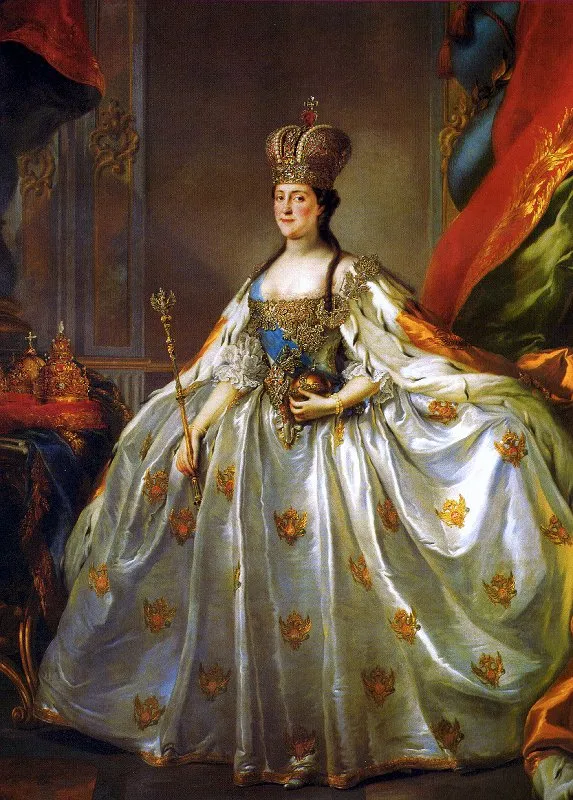
Coronation portrait by Stefano Torelli, 1763–1766

Catherine was crowned at the Assumption Cathedral in Moscow on 22 September 1762. Her coronation marks the creation of one of the main treasures of the Romanov dynasty, the Great Imperial Crown of Russia, designed by Swiss-French court diamond jeweller Jérémie Pauzié. Inspired by Byzantine design, the crown was constructed of two half spheres, one gold and one silver, representing the Eastern and Western Roman Empires, divided by a foliate garland and fastened with a low hoop.

The crown contains 75 pearls and 4,936 Indian diamonds forming laurel and oak leaves, the symbols of power and strength, and is surmounted by a 398.62-carat ruby spinel and a diamond cross. The crown was produced in a record two months and weighed 2.3kg (5.1 lbs). From 1762, the Great Imperial Crown was the coronation crown of all Romanov emperors until the monarchy's abolition in 1917. It is now on display in the Moscow Kremlin Armoury Museum.

One of Catherine's early acts following her accession concerned the rehabilitation of Alexey Bestuzhev-Ryumin, who had been arrested and disgraced during Elizabeth's reign. In a manifesto dated 31 August 1762, Catherine publicly declared his innocence, restored his former ranks and honours, and granted him an annual pension of 20,000 rubles. Although the manifesto acknowledged that Bestuzhev had been unjustly condemned, it did not attribute the injustice to Elizabeth's intentions. Instead, Catherine maintained that the former chancellor had fallen victim to deception and intrigue, contrary to the wishes of the deceased empress.

The declaration described Elizabeth as a discerning, enlightened, merciful and just monarch, and explicitly presented Bestuzhev's rehabilitation as an act undertaken in defence of her "name and virtues". Historian Sergey Solovyov later observed that the rehabilitation presented a political difficulty precisely because vindicating Bestuzhev risked implicating Elizabeth. He interpreted the manifesto's wording as a means of preserving respect for the late empress's memory while reversing the judgment against her former minister.

=== Foreign affairs ===
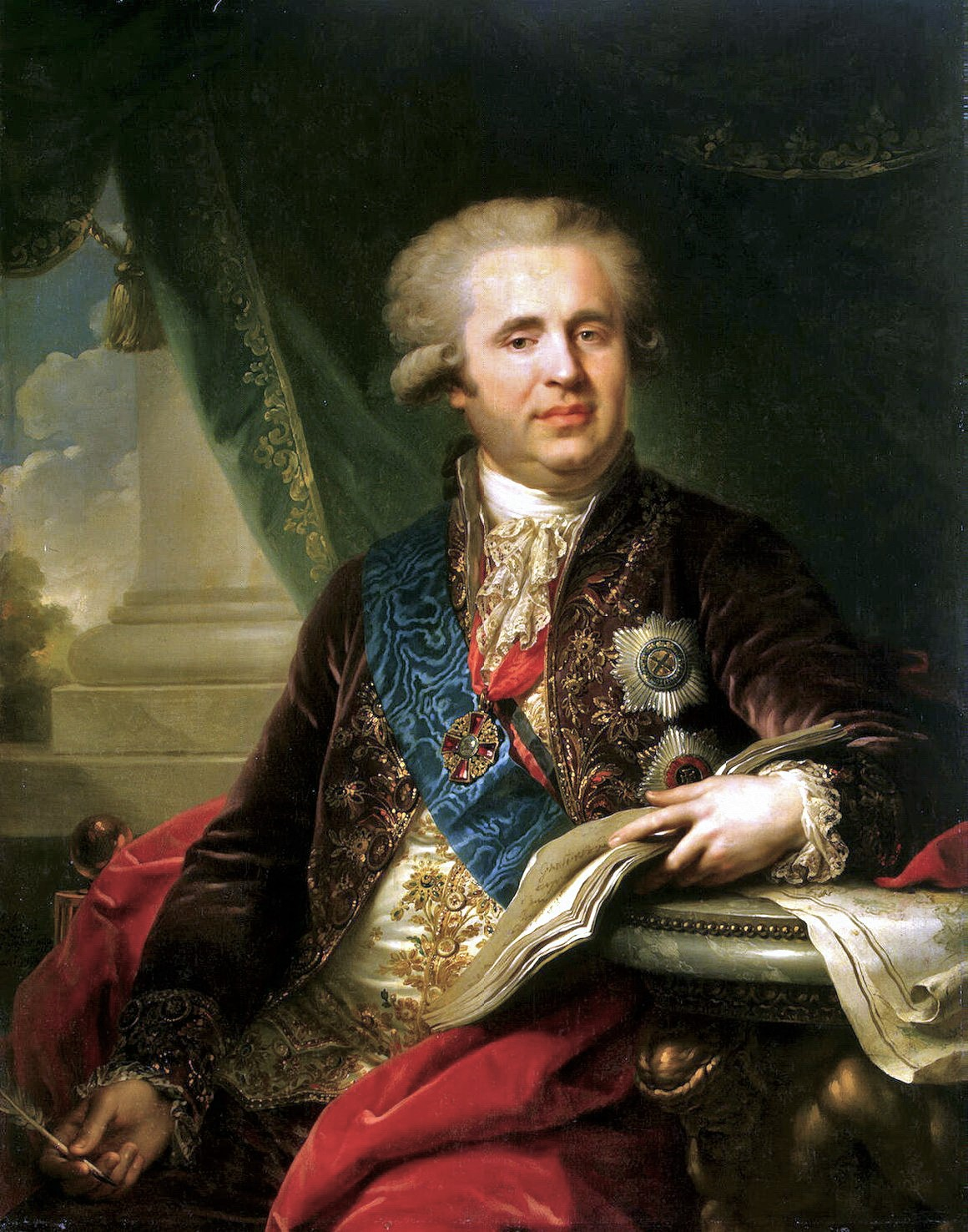
Alexander Bezborodko, the chief architect of Catherine's foreign policy after the death of Nikita Panin

During her reign, Catherine extended the borders of the Russian Empire by some 520,000 square kilometres (200,000 sq mi), absorbing New Russia, Crimea, the North Caucasus, the Right-bank Ukraine, Belarus, Lithuania, and Courland at the expense, mainly, of two powers—the Ottoman Empire and the Polish–Lithuanian Commonwealth.

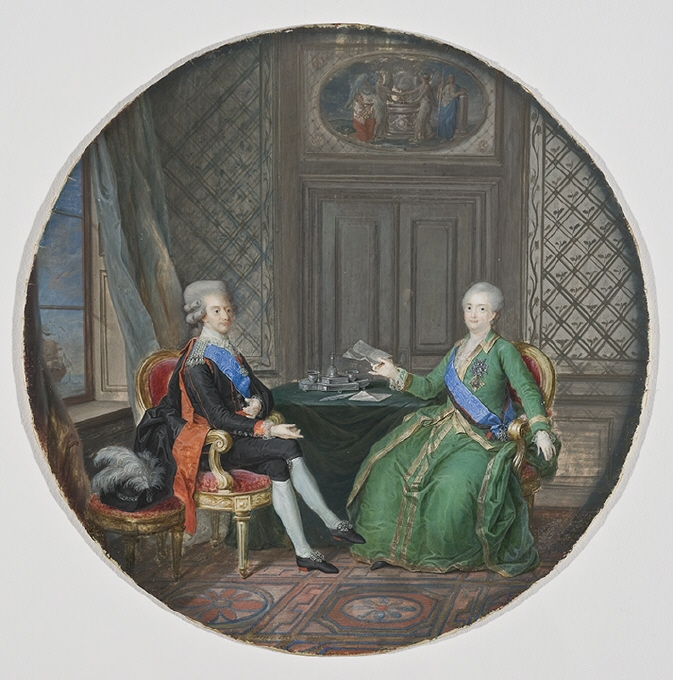
King Gustav III of Sweden and Empress Catherine II of Russia in Fredrikshamn in 1783

Catherine's foreign minister, Nikita Panin (in office 1763–1781), exercised considerable influence from the beginning of Catherine's reign. A shrewd statesman, Panin dedicated much effort and millions of rubles to setting up a "Northern Accord" between Russia, Prussia, Poland, and Sweden to counter the power of the Bourbon–Habsburg League. When it became apparent that his plan could not succeed, Panin fell out of favour with Catherine and she had him replaced with Ivan Osterman (in office 1781–1797).

Catherine agreed to a commercial treaty with Great Britain in 1766, but stopped short of a full military alliance. Although she could see the benefits of friendship with Britain, Catherine was wary of Britain's increased power following its victory in the Seven Years' War, which threatened the European balance of power.

==== Russo-Turkish Wars ====
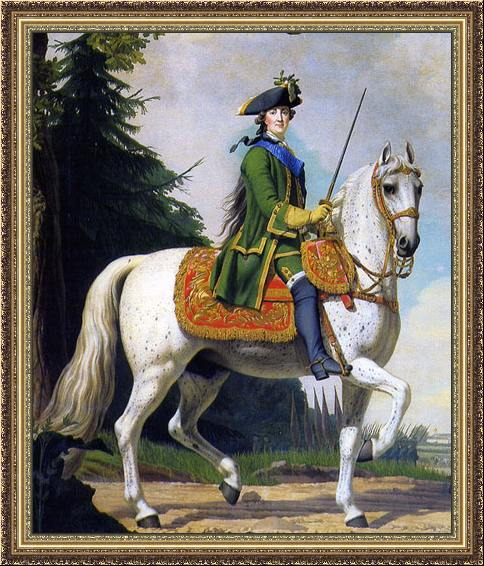
Equestrian portrait of Catherine in the Preobrazhensky Regiment's uniform, by Vigilius Eriksen

Peter the Great had gained a foothold in the south, on the edge of the Black Sea, during the Azov campaigns. Catherine completed the conquest of the south, making Russia the dominant power in the Balkans following the Russo-Turkish War of 1768–1774. Russia inflicted some of the heaviest defeats ever suffered by the Ottoman Empire, including at the Battle of Chesma (5–7 July 1770) and the Battle of Kagul (21 July 1770). In 1769, a last major Crimean–Nogai slave raid, which ravaged the Russian held territories in Ukraine, saw the capture of up to 20,000 slaves for the Crimean slave trade.

Russia's victory brought the Yedisan between the rivers Bug and Dnieper, and Crimea into the Russian sphere of influence. Though a series of victories accrued by the Russian Empire led to substantial territorial conquests, including direct conquest over much of the Pontic–Caspian steppe, less Ottoman territory was directly annexed than might otherwise be expected due to a complex struggle within the European diplomatic system to maintain a balance of power that was acceptable to other European states and avoided direct Russian hegemony over Eastern Europe. Nonetheless, Russia took advantage of the weakened Ottoman Empire, the end of the Seven Years' War, and the withdrawal of France from Polish affairs to assert itself as one of the continent's primary military powers. The war left the Russian Empire in a strengthened position to expand its territory and maintain hegemony over the Polish–Lithuanian Commonwealth, eventually leading to the First Partition of Poland. Turkish losses included diplomatic defeats which led to its decline as a threat to Europe, the loss of its exclusive control over the Orthodox millet, and the beginning of European bickering over the Eastern Question that would feature in European diplomacy until the dissolution of the Ottoman Empire in the aftermath of World War I.

The Russian victories procured access to the Black Sea and allowed Catherine's government to incorporate present-day southern Ukraine, where the Russians founded the new cities of Odessa, Nikolayev, Yekaterinoslav (literally: "the Glory of Catherine"), and Kherson. The Treaty of Küçük Kaynarca, signed 21 July 1774 (OS: 10 July 1774), gave the Russians territories at Azov, Kerch, Yenikale, Kinburn, and the small strip of Black Sea coast between the rivers Bug and Dnieper. The treaty also removed restrictions on Russian naval and commercial traffic in the Azov Sea, granted Russia the position of protector of Orthodox Christians in the Ottoman Empire and made Crimea a protectorate of Russia.

In 1770, Russia's State Council announced a policy in favour of eventual Crimean independence. Catherine named Şahin Giray, a Crimean Tatar leader, to head the Crimean state and maintain friendly relations with Russia. His period of rule proved disappointing after repeated effort to prop up his regime through military force and monetary aid. Finally, Catherine annexed Crimea in 1783. The palace of the Crimean Khanate passed into the hands of the Russians. In 1787, Catherine conducted a triumphal procession in the Crimea, which helped provoke the next Russo-Turkish War.

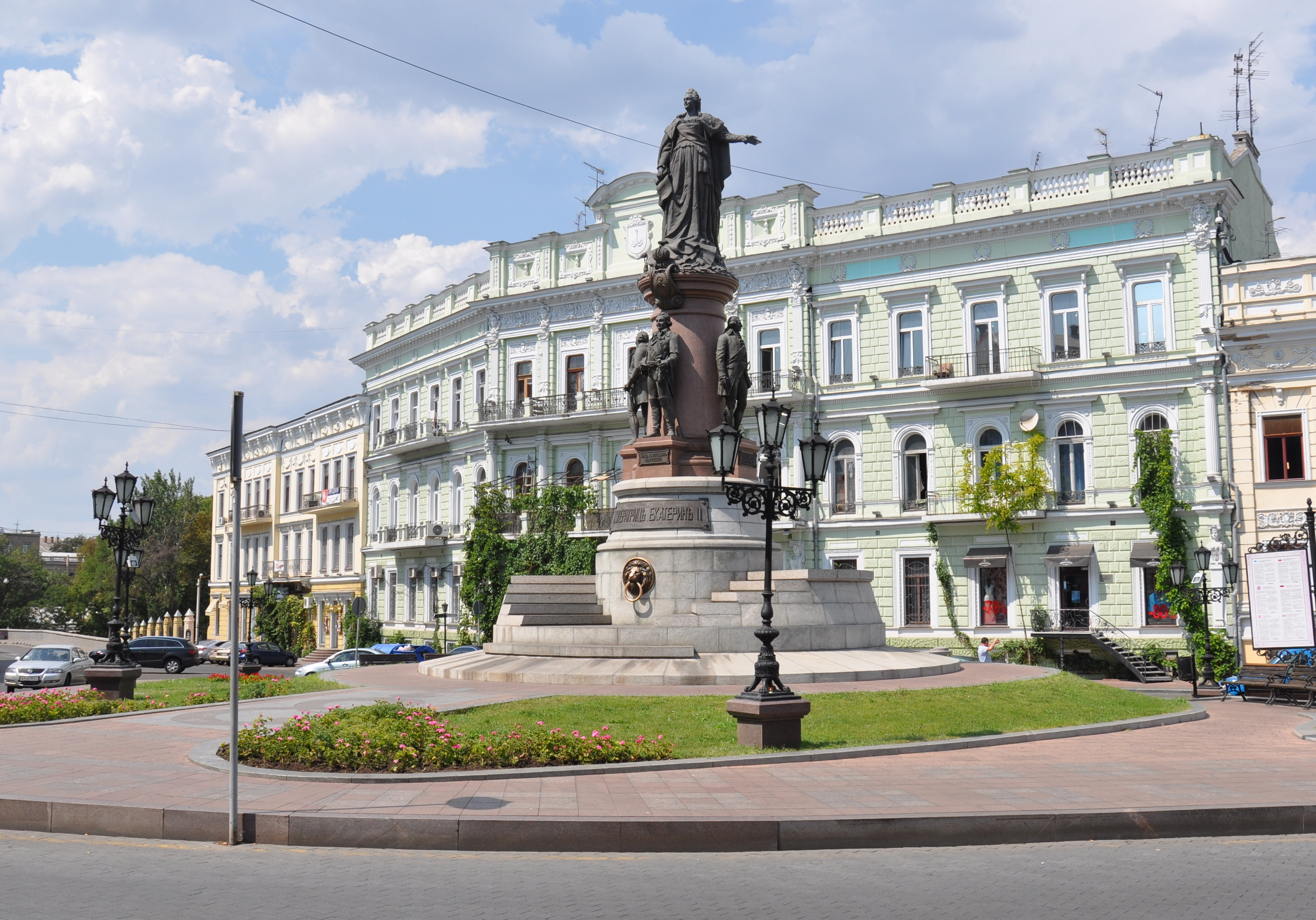
Monument to the founders of Odessa: Catherine and her companions José de Ribas, François Sainte de Wollant, Platon Zubov, and Grigory Potemkin

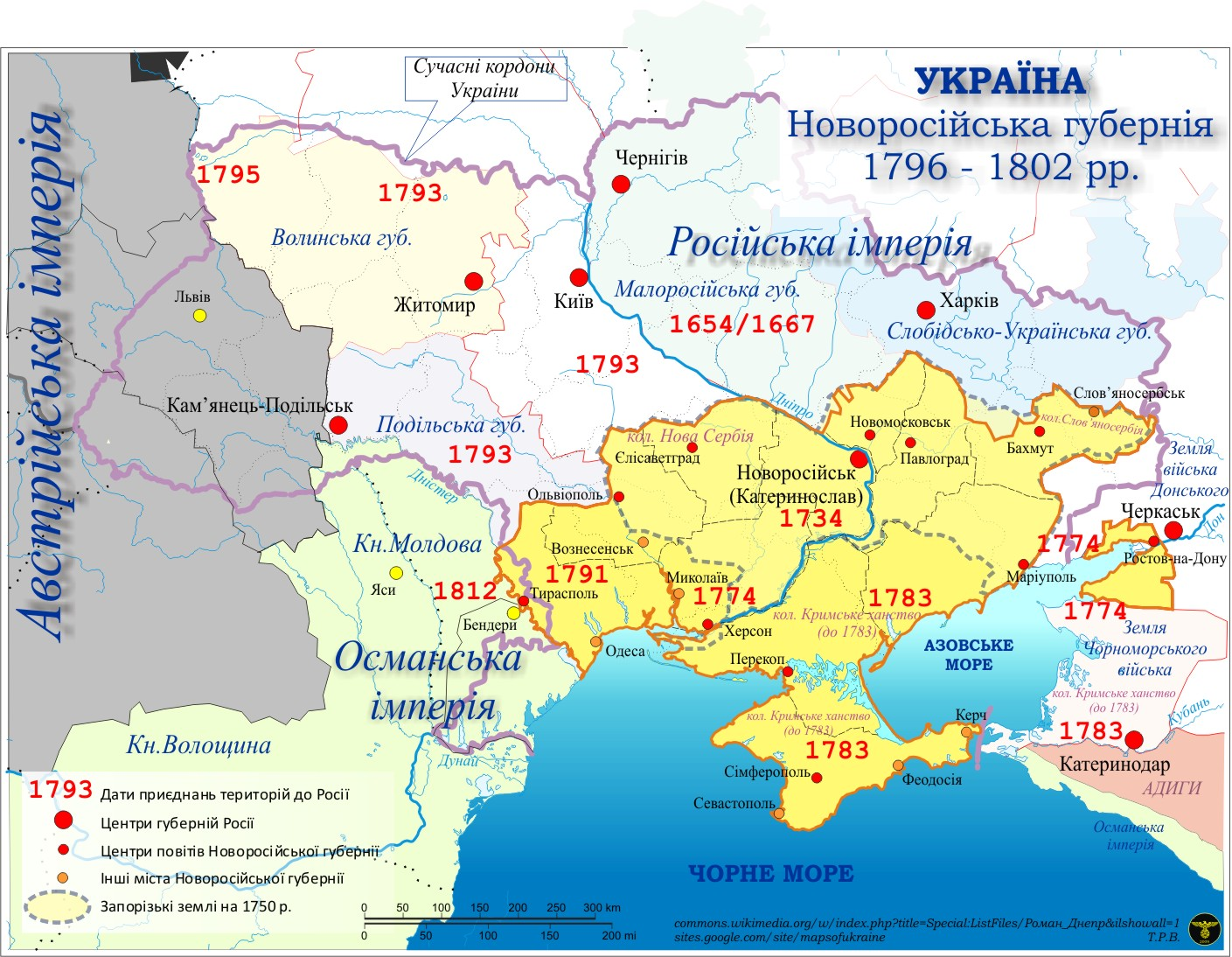
Catherine extended the borders of the Russian Empire southward to absorb the Crimean Khanate

The Ottomans restarted hostilities with Russia in the Russo-Turkish War of 1787–1792. On 25 September 1789, a detachment of the Imperial Russian Army under Alexander Suvorov and Ivan Gudovich, took Khadjibey and Yeni Dünya for the Russian Empire. In 1794, Odessa replaced Khadjibey by a decree of the Russian Empress Catherine the Great. Russia formally gained possession of the Sanjak of Özi (Ochakiv Oblast) in 1792 and it became a part of Yekaterinoslav Viceroyalty. The Russian Empire retained full control of Crimea, as well as land between the Southern Bug and the Dniester. This war was another catastrophe for the Ottomans, ending with the Treaty of Jassy (1792).

==== Russo-Persian War ====
The last decades of the 18th century were marked by continual strife between rival claimants to the Peacock Throne. Catherine took advantage of the disorder to consolidate her control over the weak polities of the Caucasus, which was, for swaths of it, an integral Persian domain. The kingdom of Georgia, a subject of the Persians for many centuries, became a Russian protectorate in 1783, when King Erekle II signed the Treaty of Georgievsk, whereby the Empress promised to defend him in the case of Persian attack. The shamkhals of Tarki followed this lead and accepted Russian protection three years later.

In the Treaty of Georgievsk (1783), Russia agreed to protect Georgia against any new invasions and further political aspirations of their Persian suzerains. Catherine waged a new war against Persia in 1796 after they, under the new king Agha Mohammad Khan, again invaded Georgia and established rule in 1795, expelling the newly established Russian garrisons in the Caucasus. The ultimate goal for the Russian government, however, was to topple the anti-Russian shah (king), and to replace him with his pro-Russian half-brother Morteza Qoli Khan, who had defected to Russia.

It was widely expected that a 13,000-strong Russian corps would be led by the seasoned general Ivan Gudovich, but the Empress followed the advice of her lover, Prince Zubov, and entrusted the command to his youthful brother, Count Valerian Zubov. The Russian troops set out from Kizlyar in April 1796 and stormed the key fortress of Derbent on 21 May (OS: 10 May). The event was glorified by the court poet Derzhavin in his famous ode; he later commented bitterly on Zubov's inglorious return from the expedition in another famous poem.

By mid-June 1796, Zubov's troops easily overran most of the territory of modern-day Azerbaijan, including three principal cities—Baku, Shemakha, and Ganja. By November, they were stationed at the confluence of the Aras and Kura Rivers, poised to attack mainland Iran. In this month, Catherine died, and her son and successor Paul I, who detested that the Zubovs had other plans for the army, ordered the troops to retreat to Russia. This reversal aroused the frustration and enmity of the powerful Zubovs and other officers who took part in the campaign; many of them would be among the conspirators who arranged Paul's murder five years later.

==== Relations with Western Europe ====
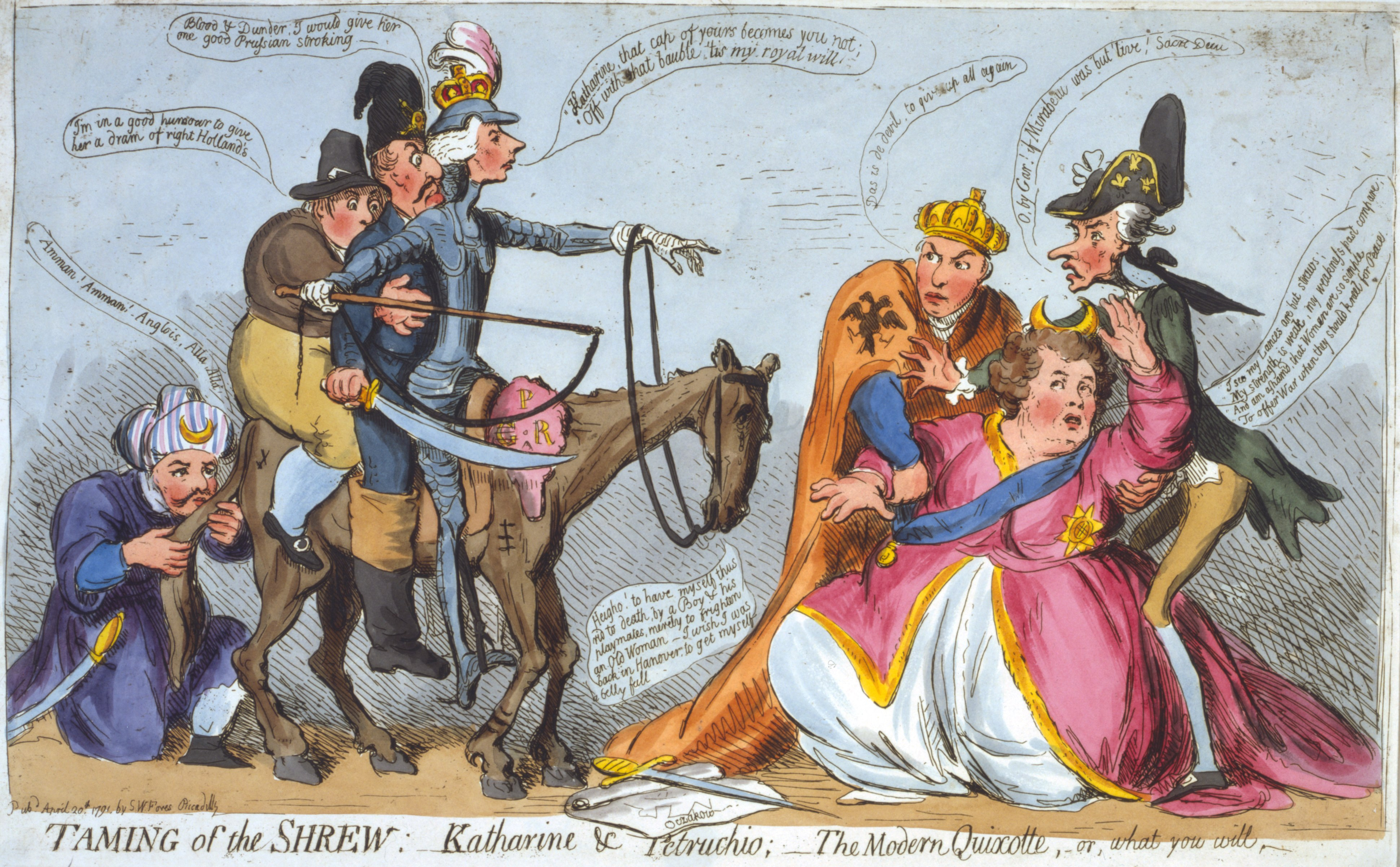
A 1791 caricature by James Gillray of an attempted mediation between Catherine the Great (on the right, supported by Austria and France) and the Ottoman Empire. William Pitt the Younger is shown in armour riding George III, his horse.

Catherine longed for recognition as an enlightened sovereign. She refused the Duchy of Holstein-Gottorp, which had ports on the coast of the Atlantic Ocean and refrained from having a Russian army in Germany. Instead, she pioneered for Russia the role that Britain later played through most of the 19th and early 20th centuries as an international mediator in disputes that could, or did, lead to war. She acted as mediator in the War of the Bavarian Succession (1778–1779) between the German states of Prussia and Austria. In 1780, she established a League of Armed Neutrality, designed to defend neutral shipping from being searched by the British Royal Navy during the American Revolutionary War.

From 1788 to 1790, Russia fought a war against Sweden instigated by Catherine's cousin, King Gustav III of Sweden, who expected to overrun the Russian armies still engaged in war against the Ottomans and hoped to strike Saint Petersburg directly. But Russia's Baltic Fleet checked the Royal Swedish navy in the tied Battle of Hogland (July 1788), and the Swedish army failed to advance. Denmark declared war on Sweden in 1788 (the Theatre War). After the decisive defeat of the Russian fleet at the Battle of Svensksund in 1790, the parties signed the Treaty of Värälä (14 August 1790), returning all conquered territories to their respective owners and confirming the Treaty of Åbo. Russia was to stop any involvement in the internal affairs of Sweden. Large sums were paid to Gustav III and peace ensued for 20 years even in spite of the assassination of Gustav III in 1792.

==== Partitions of Polish–Lithuanian Commonwealth ====
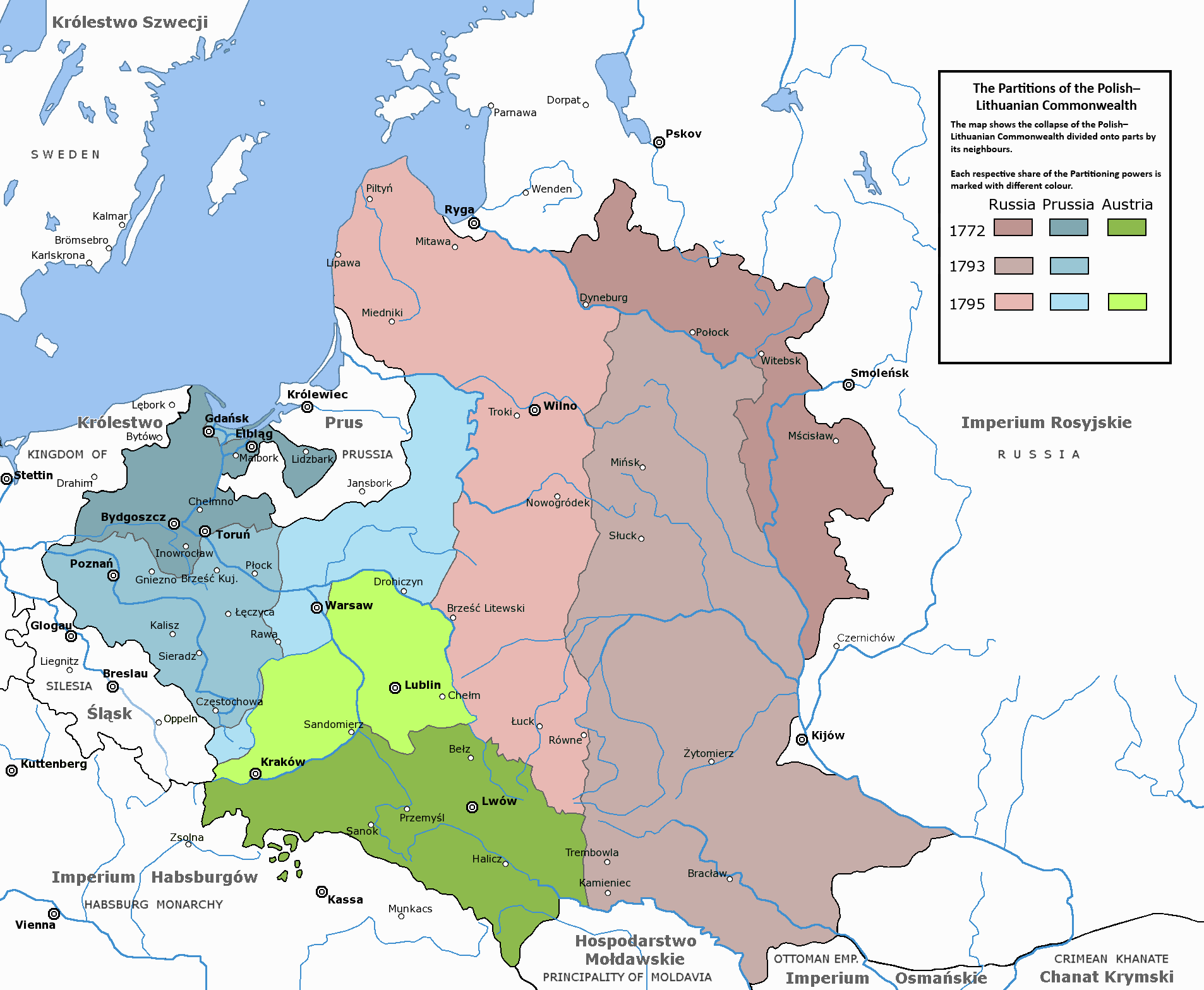
The Partitions of Poland carried out by Russia, Prussia, and Austria in 1772, 1793, and 1795

In 1764, Catherine placed Stanislaus Augustus Poniatowski, her former lover, on the Polish throne. Although the idea of partitioning Poland came from Frederick II of Prussia, Catherine took a leading role in its execution in the 1790s. In 1768, she formally became the protector of the political rights of dissidents and peasants of the Polish–Lithuanian Commonwealth, which provoked an anti-Russian uprising in Poland, the Confederation of Bar (1768–1772), supported by France. After the rebels, their French and European volunteers, and their allied Ottoman Empire had been defeated, she established in the Commonwealth a system of government fully controlled by the Russian Empire through a Permanent Council, under the supervision of her ambassadors and envoys. Empress Catherine was also satisfied despite the loss of Galicia to the Habsburg monarchy. By this "diplomatic document" Russia gained Polish Livonia, and lands in eastern Belarus embracing the counties of Vitebsk, Polotsk and Mstislavl.

In the War in Defense of the Constitution, pro-Russian conservative Polish magnates, the Confederation of Targowica, fought against Polish forces supporting the constitution, believing that Russians would help them restore the Golden Liberty. Abandoned by their Prussian allies, Polish pro-constitution forces, faced with Targowica units and the regular Russian army, were defeated. Prussia signed a treaty with Russia, agreeing that Polish reforms would be revoked, and both countries would receive chunks of Commonwealth territory. In 1793, deputies to the Grodno Sejm, last Sejm of the Commonwealth, in the presence of the Russian forces, agreed to Russian territorial demands. In the Second Partition, Russia and Prussia helped themselves to enough land so that only one-third of the 1772 population remained in Poland. Prussia named its newly gained province South Prussia, with Poznań (and later Warsaw) as the capital of the new province.Targowica confederates, who did not expect another partition, and the king, Stanisław August Poniatowski, who joined them near the end, both lost much prestige and support. The reformers, on the other hand, were attracting increasing support, and in 1794 the Kościuszko Uprising began.

Fearing that the May Constitution of Poland (1791) might lead to a resurgence in the power of the Polish–Lithuanian Commonwealth and the growing democratic movements inside the Commonwealth might become a threat to the European monarchies, Catherine decided to refrain from her planned intervention into France and to intervene in Poland instead. She provided support to a Polish anti-reform group known as the Targowica Confederation. Kosciuszko's ragtag insurgent armies won some initial successes, but they eventually fell before the superior forces of the Russian Empire.

The partitioning powers, seeing the increasing unrest in the remaining Commonwealth, decided to solve the problem by erasing any independent Polish state from the map. On 24 October 1795, their representatives signed a treaty, dividing the remaining territories of the Commonwealth between their three countries. One of Russia's chief foreign policy authors, Alexander Bezborodko, advised Catherine II on the Second and Third Partitions of Poland. The Russian part included 120,000 km^{2} (46,332 sq mi) and 1.2 million people with Vilnius. After defeating Polish loyalist forces in the Polish–Russian War of 1792 and in the Kościuszko Uprising (1794), Russia completed the partitioning of Poland, dividing all of the remaining Commonwealth territory with Prussia and Austria (1795).

==== Relations with China ====
The Qianlong Emperor of China was committed to an expansionist policy in Central Asia and saw the Russian Empire as a potential rival, making for difficult and unfriendly relations between Beijing and Saint Petersburg. In 1762, he unilaterally abrogated the Treaty of Kyakhta, which governed the caravan trade between the two empires. Another source of tension was the wave of Dzungar Mongol fugitives from the Qing Empire who took refuge with the Russians.

The Dzungar genocide which was committed by the Qing Empire had led many Dzungars to seek sanctuary in the Russian Empire, and it was also one of the reasons for the abrogation of the Treaty of Kyakhta. Catherine perceived that the Qianlong Emperor was an unpleasant and arrogant neighbour, once saying: "I shall not die until I have ejected the Turks from Europe, suppressed the pride of China and established trade with India". In a 1790 letter to Baron de Grimm written in French, she called the Qianlong Emperor "mon voisin chinois aux petits yeux" ("my Chinese neighbour with small eyes").

==== Relations with Japan ====
In the Far East, Russians became active in fur trapping in Kamchatka and the Kuril Islands. This spurred Russian interest in opening trade with Japan to the south for supplies and food. In 1783, storms drove a Japanese sea captain, Daikokuya Kōdayū, ashore in the Aleutian Islands, at that time Russian territory. Russian local authorities helped his party, and the Russian government decided to use him as a trade envoy. On 28 June 1791, Catherine granted Daikokuya an audience at Tsarskoye Selo. Subsequently, in 1792, the Russian government dispatched a trade mission to Japan, led by Adam Laxman. The Tokugawa shogunate received the mission, but negotiations failed.

==== The evaluation of foreign policy ====
Nicholas I, her grandson, evaluated the foreign policy of Catherine the Great as a dishonest one. Catherine failed to reach any of the initial goals she had put forward. Her foreign policy lacked a long-term strategy and from the very start was characterised by a series of mistakes. She lost the large territories of the Russian protectorate of the Commonwealth of Poland and Lithuania and left its territories to Prussia and Austria. The Commonwealth had become the Russian protectorate since the reign of Peter I, but he did not intervene into the problem of political freedoms of dissidents advocating for their religious freedoms only. Catherine did turn Russia into a global great power, not only a European one, but with quite a different reputation from what she initially had planned as an honest policy. The global trade of Russian natural resources and Russian grain provoked famines, starvation and fear of famines in Russia. Her dynasty lost power because of this and of a war with Austria and Germany, impossible without her foreign policy.

=== Economics and finance ===
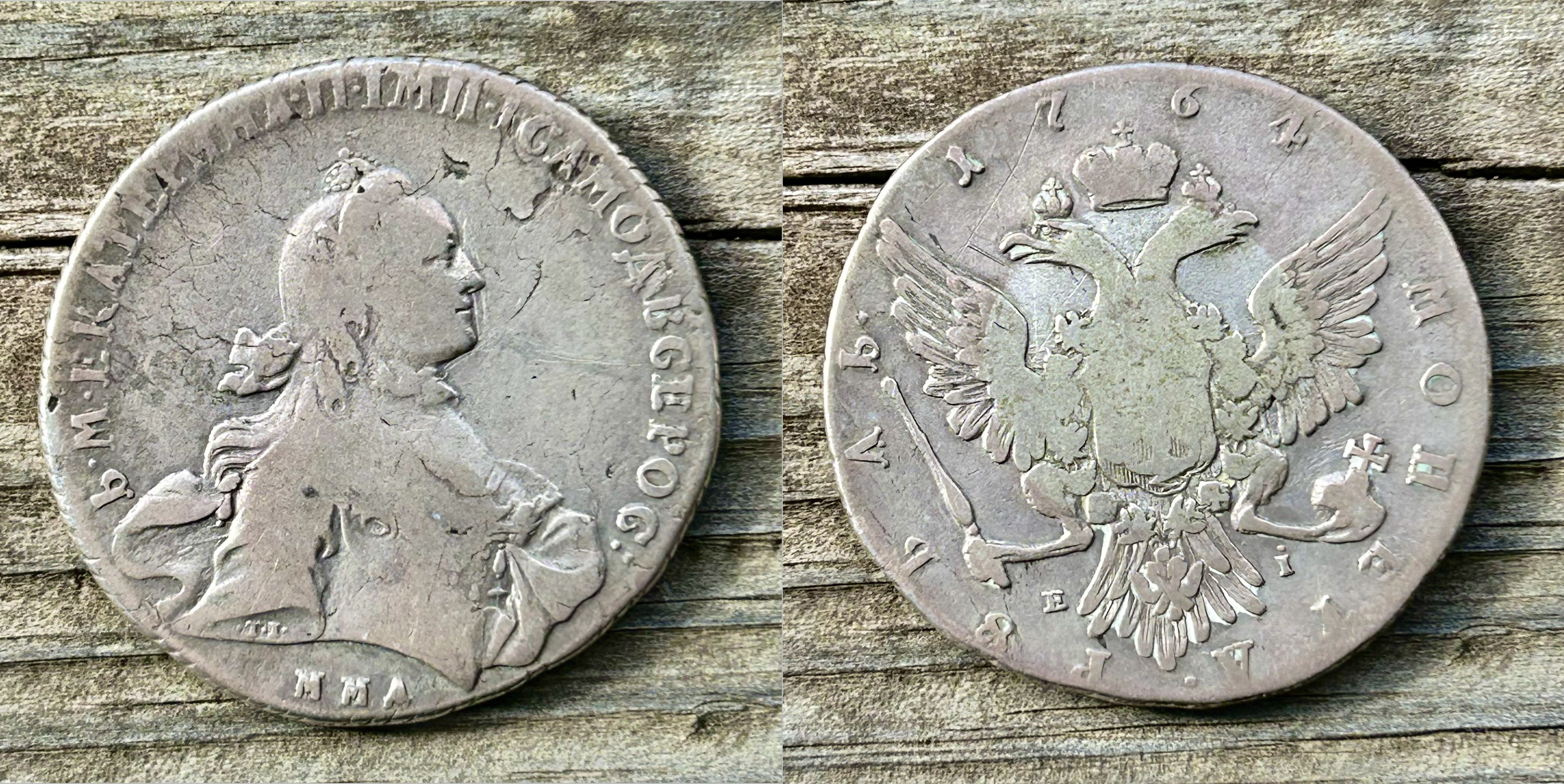
1764, Rouble Catherine II ММД - Krasny Mint

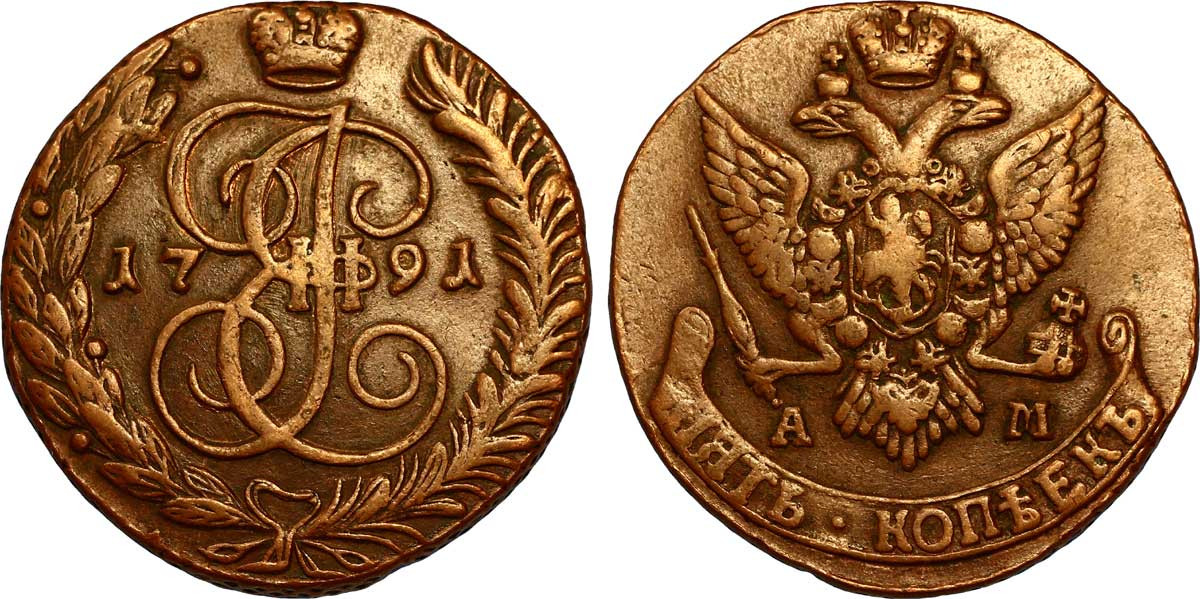
A 5-kopeck coin bearing the monogram of Catherine the Great and the Imperial coat of arms, dated 1791

Russian economic development was well below the standards in western Europe. Historian François Cruzet writes that Russia under Catherine:

had neither a free peasantry, nor a significant middle class, nor legal norms hospitable to private enterprise. Still, there was a start of industry, mainly textiles around Moscow and ironworks in the Ural Mountains, with a labour force mainly of serfs, bound to the works.

Catherine II's economic policies combined measures intended to liberalise manufacturing and trade with continued state regulation and the preservation of established social privileges. Influenced by Enlightenment economic thought, including physiocracy, she advocated greater freedom for private enterprise and criticised restrictions on commerce and manufacturing. Historian Victor Leontovitsch identifies these ideas as an important element of her reform programme, while Andrew Kahn describes the reduction of manufacturing regulation as part of her economic liberalisation policies.

An important reform took place in 1775, when Catherine abolished the restrictions on establishing manufacturing enterprises previously administered by the College of Manufactures. Under the earlier system, most manufacturing enterprises, apart from mining and metallurgy, had been required to obtain official approval and submit to the College's supervision. The abolition of these restrictions led to the dissolution of the College in 1779.

Catherine's government also curtailed certain state and private monopolies in domestic commerce and revised customs tariffs in 1766–1767 and 1782. Historians Boris Ananich and Ji Bae Park interpret these changes as steps towards freer trade. Nevertheless, the government retained protective tariffs, regulated aspects of foreign commerce and pursued policies that favoured the landed nobility.

The expansion of commercial credit and banking institutions was another feature of the period. Ananich describes the financial arrangements developed under Catherine as the "Catherine credit system", which continued into the mid-nineteenth century. The accumulation of capital and improvements in monetary circulation helped create conditions for private lending and industrial expansion.

These reforms did not establish an unrestricted market economy. Catherine's reorganisation of the merchant guilds in 1775 and the Charter to the Towns of 1785 preserved distinctions between categories of merchants and granted them different commercial privileges. Serfdom, estate-based legal restrictions and protectionist policies remained important features of the Russian economy.

Catherine also sought to dismantle the commercial monopolies that had proliferated during the final years of Elizabeth's reign. According to historian David M. Griffiths, she abolished most of the state and private monopolies in trade and manufacturing introduced under her predecessor, opening previously restricted economic activities to other participants. A decree of 31 July 1762 liberalised trade with China, removed exclusive privileges concerning silk imports and beaver-pelt exports, and abolished certain tobacco, fishing and seal-hunting tax farms.

Her opposition to exclusive privileges continued throughout her reign. In a letter to Grigory Potemkin in 1781, Catherine complained that she had spent nineteen years attempting to eradicate monopolistic arrangements inherited at her accession. In 1788, she rejected a proposal to grant Grigory Shelikhov and Ivan Golikov exclusive trading and hunting rights in the North Pacific, describing such a monopoly as "contrary to my principles" and warning that it would reopen the way for the "hundred-headed monster" of monopoly. Nevertheless, state control and tax farming persisted in sectors such as salt and alcohol.

She had more success when she strongly encouraged the migration of the Volga Germans, farmers from Germany who settled mostly in the Volga River Valley region. They indeed helped modernise the sector that totally dominated the Russian economy. They introduced numerous innovations regarding wheat production and flour milling, tobacco culture, sheep raising, and small-scale manufacturing.

In 1768, the Assignation Bank was given the task of issuing the first government paper money. It opened in Saint Petersburg and Moscow in 1769. Several bank branches were afterwards established in other towns, called government towns. Paper notes were issued upon payment of similar sums in copper money, which were also refunded upon the presentation of those notes. The emergence of these assignation roubles was necessary due to large government spending on military needs, which led to a shortage of silver in the treasury (transactions, especially in foreign trade, were conducted almost exclusively in silver and gold coins). Assignation roubles circulated on equal footing with the silver rouble; a market exchange rate for these two currencies was ongoing. The use of these notes continued until 1849.

Catherine paid a great deal of attention to financial reform, and relied heavily on the advice of Prince A. A. Viazemski. She found that piecemeal reform worked poorly because there was no overall view of a comprehensive state budget. Money was needed for wars and necessitated the junking of the old financial institutions. A key principle was responsibilities defined by function. It was instituted by the Fundamental Law of 7 November 1775. Vaizemski's Office of State Revenue took centralised control and by 1781, the government possessed its first approximation of a state budget.

=== Public health ===
Catherine made public health a priority. She made use of the social theory ideas of German cameralism and French physiocracy, as well as Russian precedents and experiments such as foundling homes. In 1764, she launched the Moscow Foundling Home and lying-in hospital. In 1763, she opened Paul's Hospital, also known as Pavlovskaya Hospital. She had the government collect and publish vital statistics. In 1762, she called on the army to upgrade its medical services. She established a centralised medical administration charged with initiating vigorous health policies. Catherine decided to have herself inoculated against smallpox by English doctor Thomas Dimsdale. While this was considered a controversial method at the time, she succeeded. Her son Pavel later was inoculated as well.

Catherine then sought to have inoculations throughout her empire and stated: "My objective was, through my example, to save from death the multitude of my subjects who, not knowing the value of this technique, and frightened of it, were left in danger". By 1800, approximately 2 million inoculations (almost 6% of the population) were administered in the Russian Empire. Historians regard her efforts as a success and one of her most significant contributions to Russia.

=== Social welfare ===
Catherine II promoted the development of social welfare and charitable institutions, particularly through her collaboration with the educational reformer Ivan Betskoy. In 1763, she approved the establishment of the Moscow Foundling Home, which began operating in 1764. A corresponding institution was established in Saint Petersburg in 1770 and became independent in 1772. These institutions were intended to provide care and education for abandoned children, orphans, and children from impoverished families, including vocational training. In 1774, Catherine granted the Moscow Foundling Home a charter guaranteeing that its pupils and their descendants would remain free persons and could not be reduced to serfdom, regardless of their parents' social status.

In 1772, Catherine approved Betskoy's proposal to establish three financial institutions associated with the imperial foundling homes: the Widows' Treasury (Vdovya kazna), the Safe Treasury (Sokhrannaya kazna), and the Loan Treasury (Ssudnaya kazna). The Widows' Treasury provided for annuities to surviving wives in exchange for advance contributions made by their husbands. The Safe Treasury accepted interest-bearing deposits and provided secured loans, while the Loan Treasury offered short-term loans against movable property. The institutions were also intended to contribute to the financing of the foundling homes. Although the Widows' Treasury represented an early form of contributory provision for surviving spouses, participation remained limited. Catherine also continued to develop military pension arrangements, extending payments to eligible retired officers and to the widows and children of deceased servicemen, with funds drawn from both the state treasury and her Imperial Cabinet.

The provincial reform of 1775 further incorporated public welfare into the administrative responsibilities of local government. The Statute on Provincial Administration established boards of public welfare (prikazy obshchestvennogo prizreniya), charged with organising and supervising public schools, orphanages, hospitals, almshouses, institutions for the elderly and disabled, facilities for people with mental illnesses, and workhouses. The legislation provided for an initial allocation of 15,000 roubles to each provincial board, while also allowing charitable contributions and other sources of funding. These provisions established a legal and administrative framework for provincial public assistance, although the actual development and availability of services varied considerably between regions.

=== Serfs ===
According to a census taken from 1754 to 1762, Catherine owned 500,000 serfs. A further 2.8 million belonged to the Russian state.

==== Rights and conditions ====
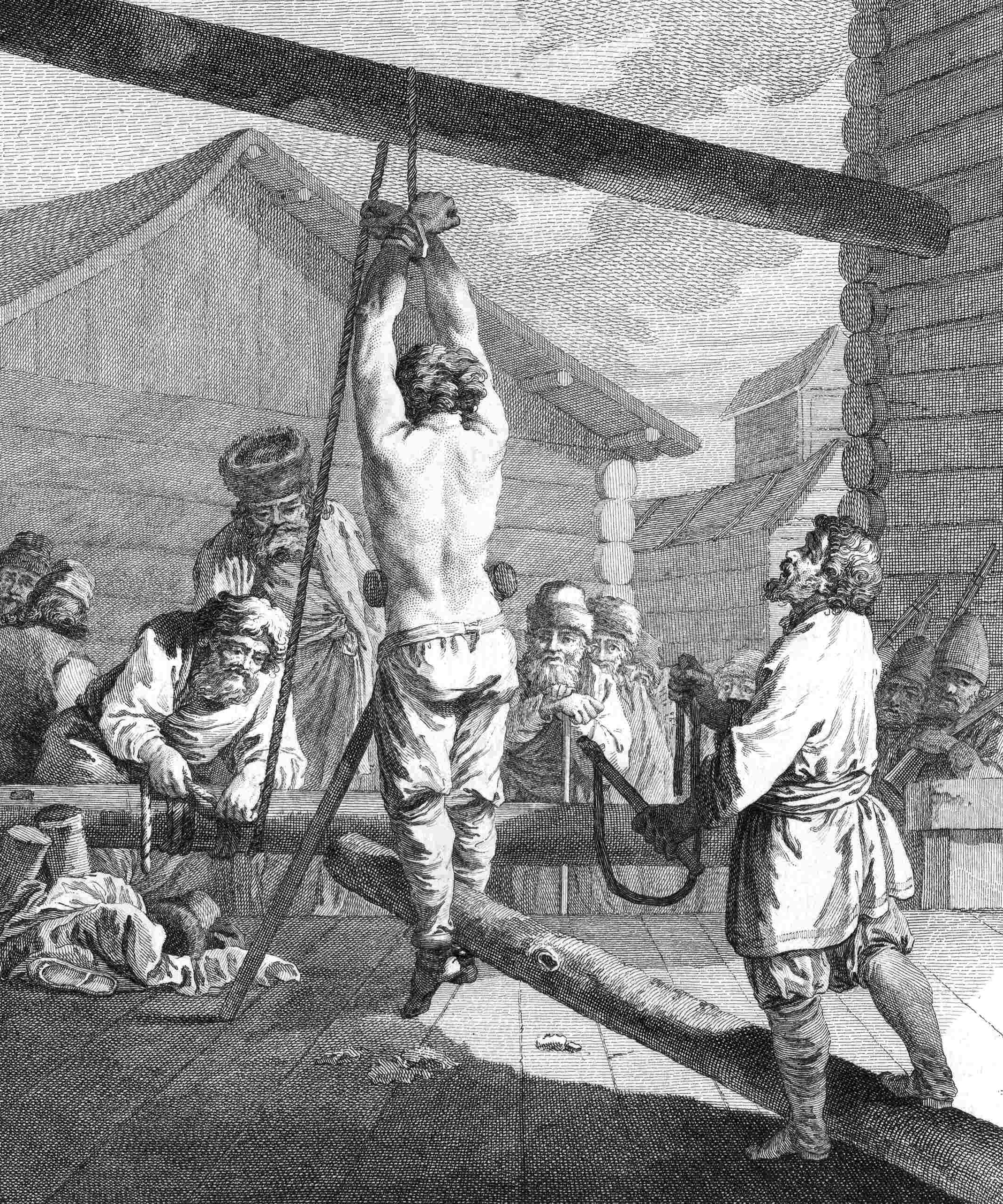
Punishment with a knout

At the time of Catherine's reign, the landowning noble class owned the serfs, who were bound to the land they tilled. Children of serfs were born into serfdom and worked the same land their parents had. Even before the rule of Catherine, serfs had very limited rights, but they were not exactly slaves. While the state did not technically allow them to own possessions, some serfs were able to accumulate enough wealth to pay for their freedom. The understanding of law in Imperial Russia by all sections of society was often weak, confused, or nonexistent, particularly in the provinces where most serfs lived. This is why some serfs were able to do things such as to accumulate wealth. To become serfs, people conceded their freedoms to a landowner in exchange for their protection and support in times of hardship. In addition, they received land to till, but were taxed a certain percentage of their crops to give to their landowners. These were the privileges a serf was entitled to and that nobles were bound to carry out. All of this was true before Catherine's reign, and this is the system she inherited.

Catherine did initiate some changes to serfdom. If a noble did not live up to his side of the deal, the serfs could file complaints against him by following the proper channels of law. Catherine gave them this new right, but in exchange they could no longer appeal directly to her. She did this because she did not want to be bothered by the peasantry, but did not want to give them reason to revolt. In this act, she gave the serfs a legitimate bureaucratic status they had lacked before. Some serfs were able to use their new status to their advantage. For example, serfs could apply to be freed if they were under illegal ownership, and non-nobles were not allowed to own serfs. Some serfs did apply for freedom and were successful. In addition, some governors listened to the complaints of serfs and punished nobles, but this was by no means universal.

Other than these, the rights of a serf were very limited. A landowner could punish his serfs at his discretion, and under Catherine the Great gained the ability to sentence his serfs to hard labour in Siberia, a punishment normally reserved for convicted criminals. The only thing a noble could not do to his serfs was to kill them. The life of a serf belonged to the state. Historically, when the serfs faced problems they could not solve on their own (such as abusive masters), they often appealed to the autocrat, and continued doing so during Catherine's reign, but she signed legislation prohibiting it. Although she did not want to communicate directly with the serfs, she did create some measures to improve their conditions as a class and reduce the size of the institution of serfdom. For example, she took action to limit the number of new serfs; she eliminated many ways for people to become serfs, culminating in the manifesto of 17 March 1775, which prohibited a serf who had once been freed from becoming a serf again.

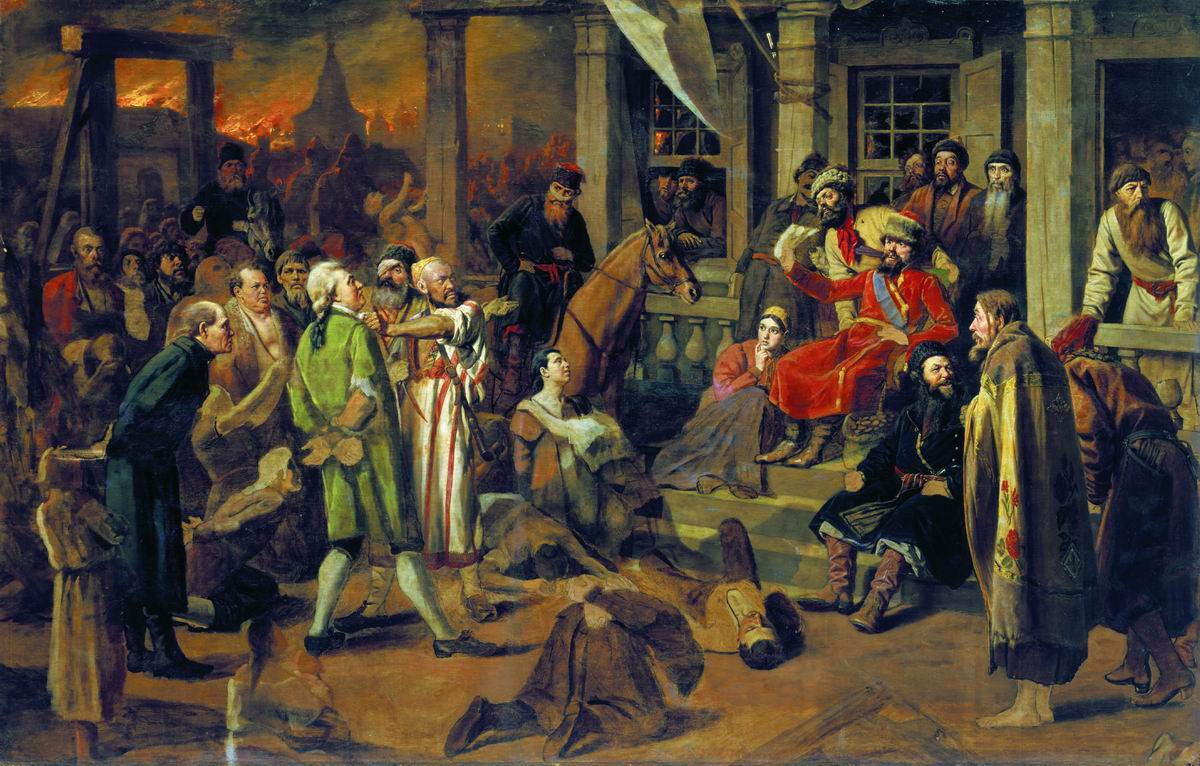
Captured Russian officials and aristocrats being tried by Pugachev

While the majority of serfs were farmers bound to the land, a noble could have his serfs sent away to learn a trade or be educated at a school as well as employ them at businesses that paid wages. This happened more often during Catherine's reign because of the new schools she established. Only in this way—apart from conscription to the army—could a serf leave the farm for which he was responsible, but this was used for selling serfs to people who could not own them legally because of absence of nobility abroad.

==== Attitudes towards Catherine ====
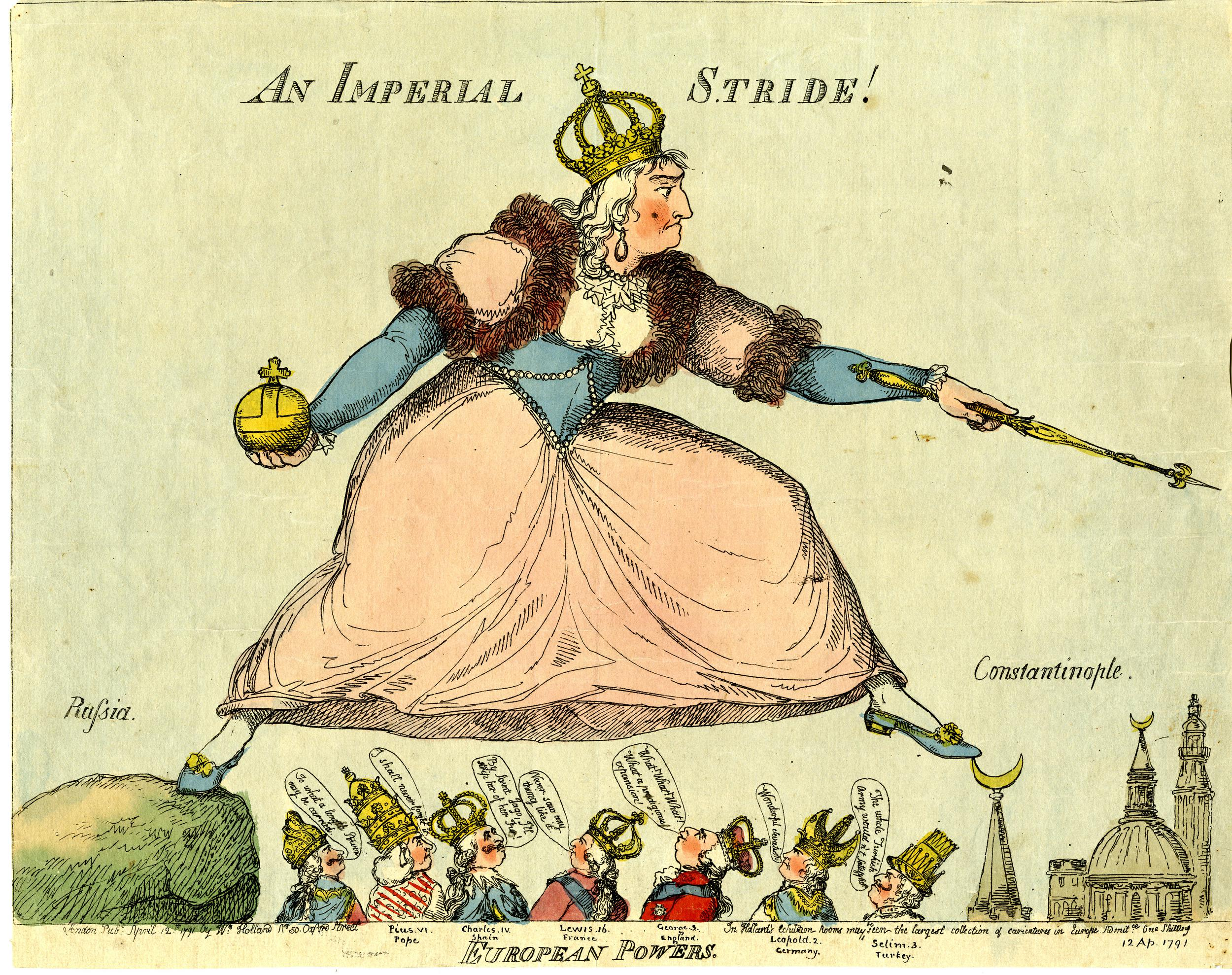
A satire on Catherine's morals and on the Russo-Turkish war, from 1791

The attitude of the serfs toward their autocrat had historically been a positive one, usually choosing to blame the nobles for blocking off communication with Catherine. Additionally, because the serfs had no political power, they frequently rioted to convey their message. They were suspicious of Catherine upon her accession because she had annulled an act by Peter III that essentially freed the serfs belonging to the Russian Orthodox Church. People far away from the capital were confused as to the circumstances of her accession to the throne.

The peasants were discontented because of many other factors as well, including crop failure and epidemics, especially a major epidemic in 1771. The nobles were imposing a stricter rule than ever, reducing the land of each serf and restricting their freedoms further beginning around 1767. Their discontent led to widespread outbreaks of violence and rioting during Pugachev's Rebellion of 1774. The serfs most likely followed someone who was pretending to be Peter III because of their feelings of disconnection to Catherine and her policies empowering the nobles, but this was not the first time they followed a pretender under Catherine's reign.

Pugachev had made stories about himself acting as a real emperor should, doing noble things like helping the common people, listening to their problems, praying for them, and generally acting saintly, and this helped rally the peasants and serfs, with their already moral values, to his cause. Under the peasants' dislike of Catherine, she overall ruled for 10 years before their anger boiled over into a rebellion as extensive as Pugachev's. The rebellion ultimately failed as Catherine was pushed away from the idea of serf liberation following the violent uprising. Despite Catherine's enlightened ideals, the serfs were generally unhappy and discontented under her rule.

== Arts and culture ==
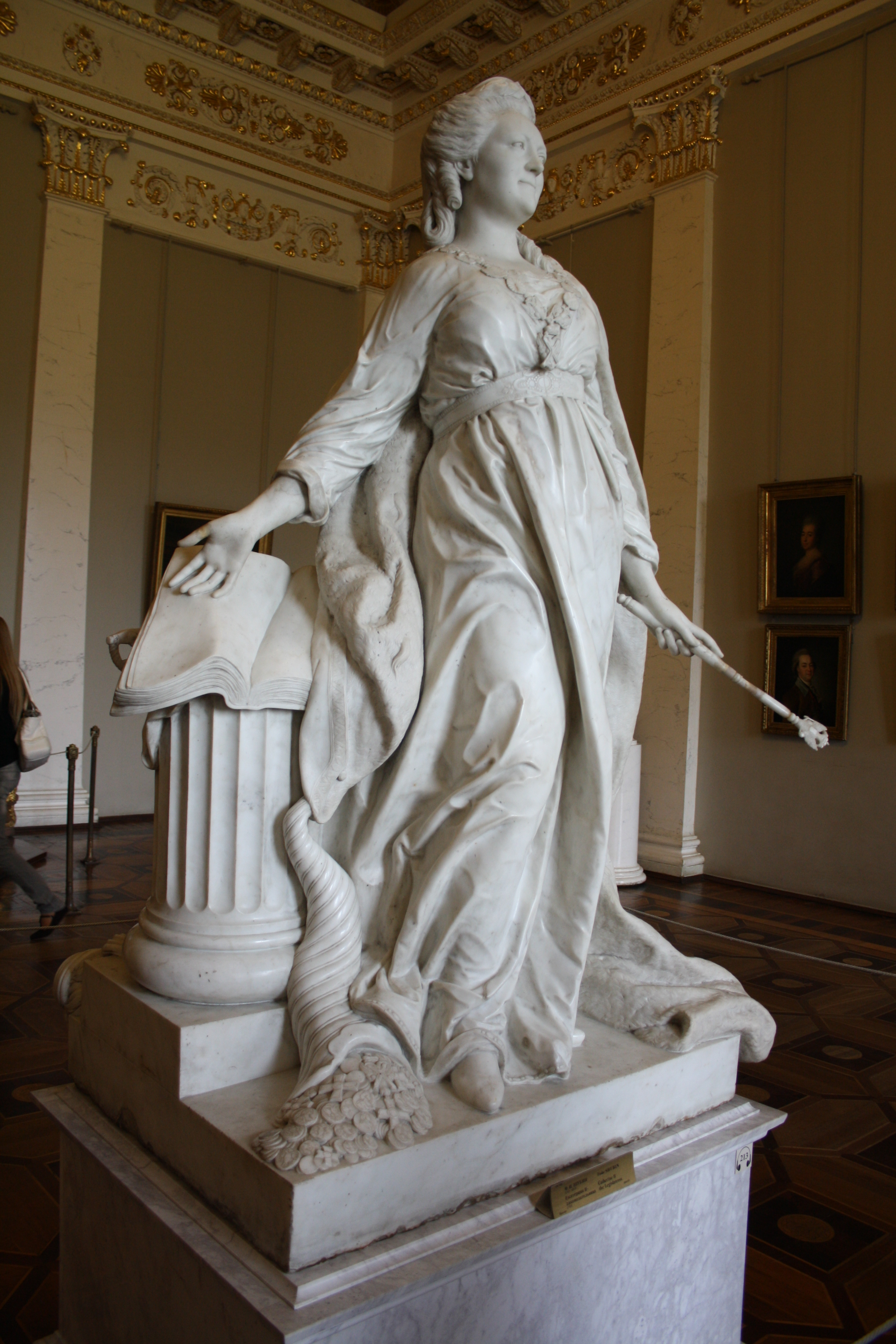
Marble statue of Catherine II in the guise of Minerva (1789–1790), by Fedot Shubin

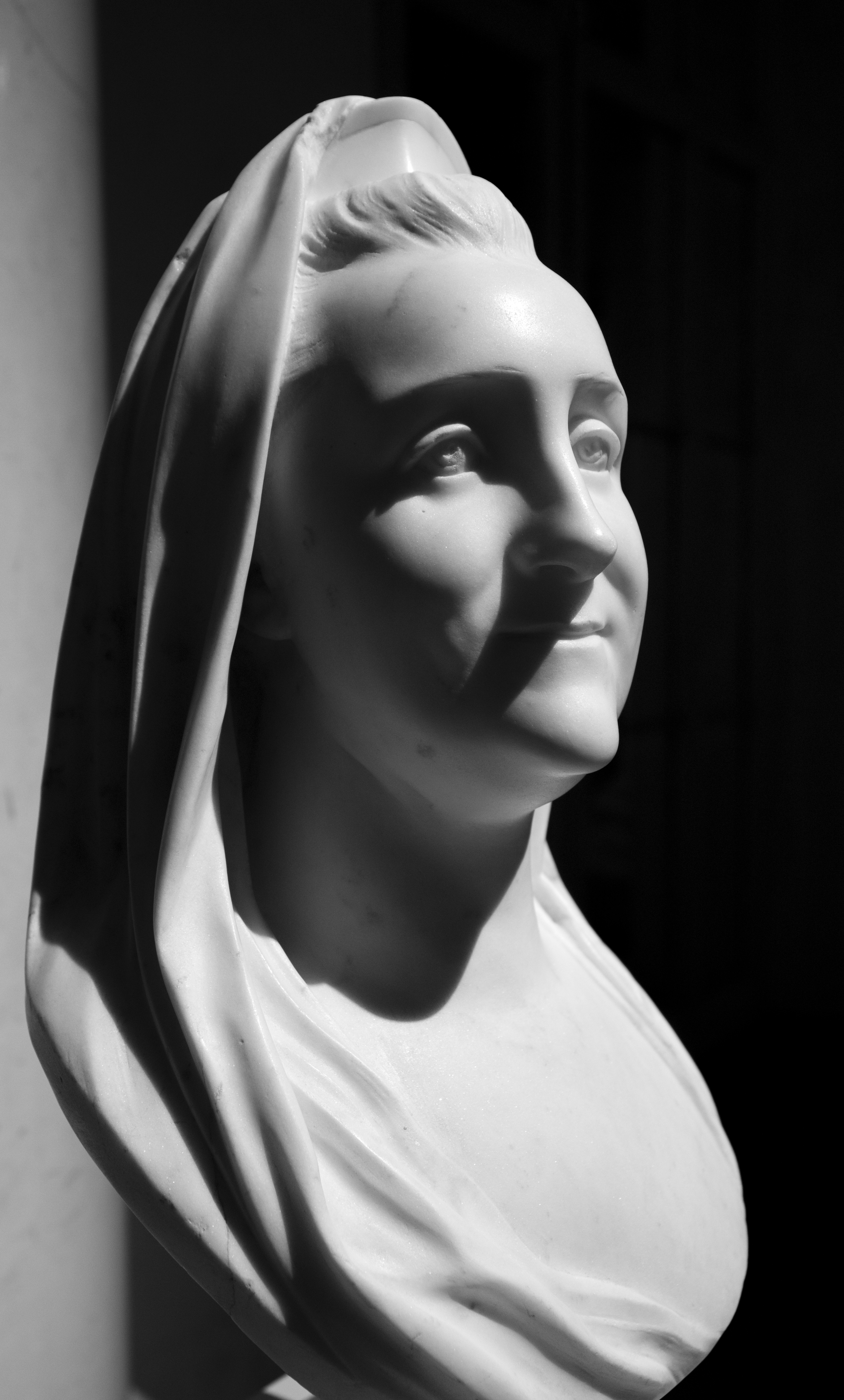
Portrait of Catherine the Great by Marie-Anne Collot, marble, 1769, The State Hermitage Museum, Saint Petersburg

Catherine was a patron of the arts, literature, and education. The Hermitage Museum, which now occupies the whole Winter Palace, began as Catherine's personal collection. The empress was a great lover of art and books, and ordered the construction of the Hermitage in 1770 to house her expanding collection of paintings, sculpture, and books. By 1790, the Hermitage was home to 38,000 books, 10,000 gems, and 10,000 drawings. Two wings were devoted to her collections of "curiosities".

She ordered the planting of the first English landscape garden at Tsarskoye Selo in May 1770. In a letter to Voltaire in 1772, she wrote: "Right now I adore English gardens, curves, gentle slopes, ponds in the form of lakes, archipelagos on dry land, and I have a profound scorn for straight lines, symmetric avenues. I hate fountains that torture water in order to make it take a course contrary to its nature: Statues are relegated to galleries, vestibules etc.; in a word, Anglomania is the master of my plantomania".

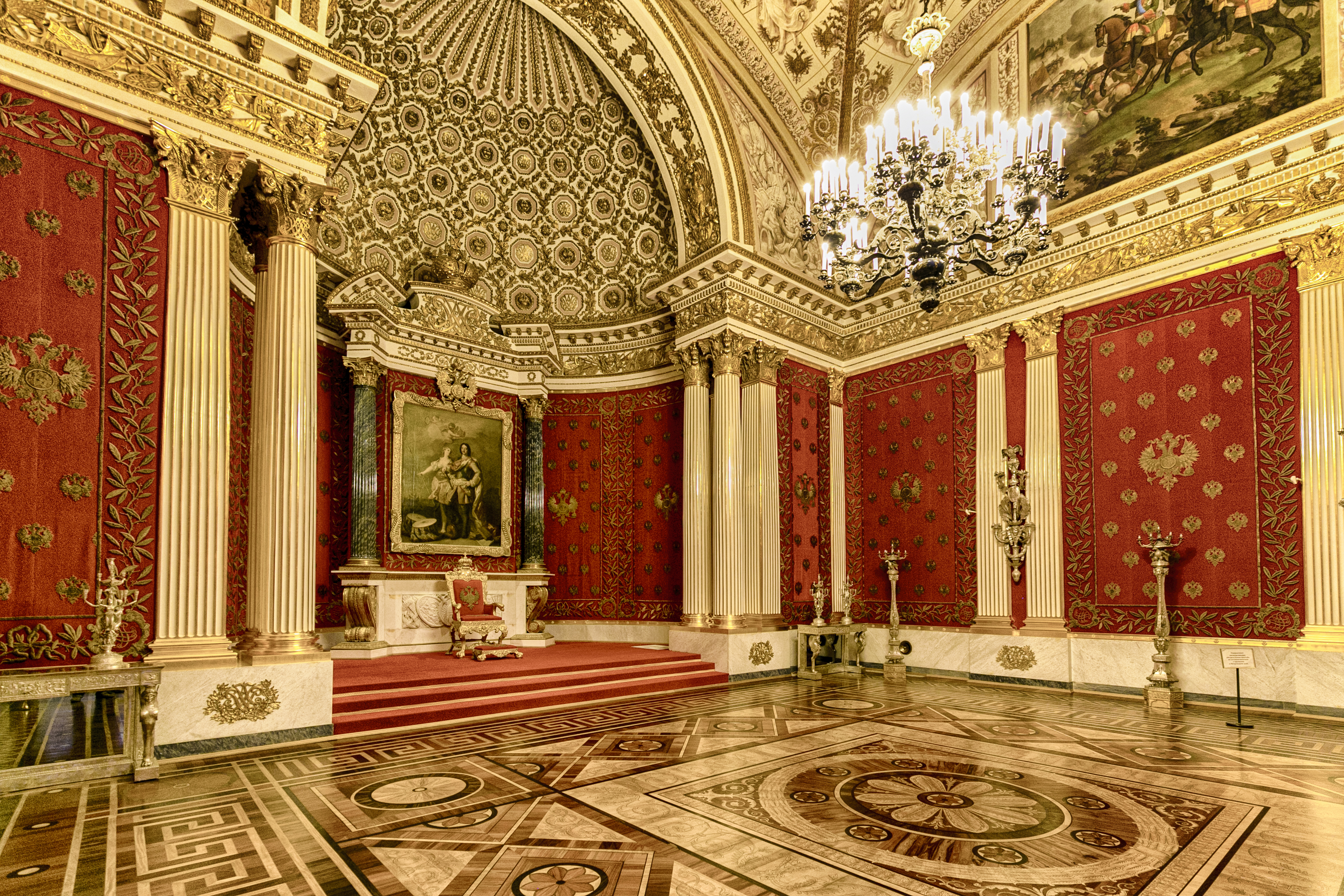
The throne of Empress Catherine II in the Winter Palace

Catherine shared in the general European craze for all things Chinese, and made a point of collecting Chinese art and buying porcelain in the popular Chinoiserie style. Between 1762 and 1766, she had built the "Chinese Palace" at Oranienbaum which reflected the chinoiserie style of architecture and gardening. The Chinese Palace was designed by the Italian architect Antonio Rinaldi who specialised in the chinoiserie style. In 1779, she hired the Scottish architect Charles Cameron to build the Chinese Village at Tsarskoye Selo. Catherine had at first attempted to hire a Chinese architect to build the Chinese Village, and on finding that was impossible, settled on Cameron, who likewise specialised in the chinoiserie style.

She made a special effort to bring leading intellectuals and scientists to Russia, and she wrote her own comedies, works of fiction, and memoirs. She worked with Voltaire, Diderot, and d'Alembert—all French encyclopedists who later cemented her reputation in their writings. The leading economists of her day, such as Arthur Young and Jacques Necker, became foreign members of the Free Economic Society, established on her suggestion in Saint Petersburg in 1765. She recruited the scientists Leonhard Euler and Peter Simon Pallas from Berlin and Anders Johan Lexell from Sweden to the Russian capital.

Catherine enlisted Voltaire to her cause, and corresponded with him for 15 years, from her accession to his death in 1778. He lauded her accomplishments, calling her "The Star of the North" and the "Semiramis of Russia" (in reference to the legendary Queen of Babylon, a subject on which he published a tragedy in 1768). Although she never met him face to face, she mourned him bitterly when he died. She acquired his collection of books from his heirs, and placed them in the National Library of Russia.

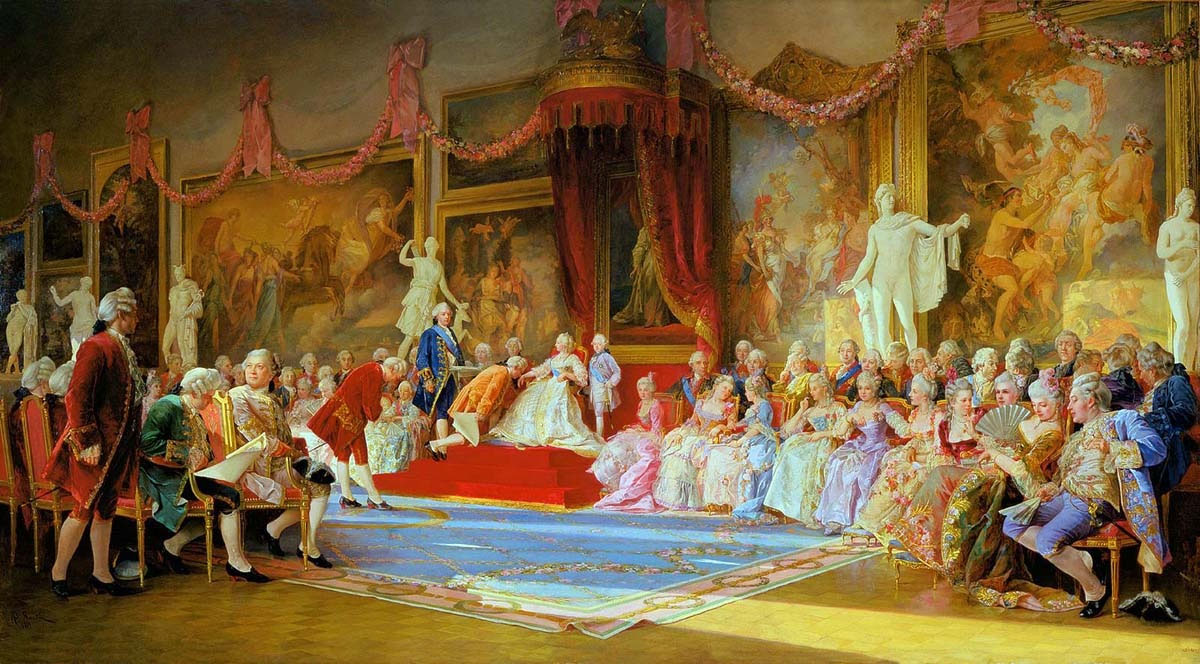
The inauguration of the Imperial Academy of Arts in Saint Petersburg in 1757

Catherine read three sorts of books, namely those for pleasure, those for information, and those to provide her with a philosophy. In the first category, she read romances and comedies that were popular at the time, many of which were regarded as "inconsequential" by the critics both then and since. She especially liked the work of German comic writers such as Moritz August von Thümmel and Christoph Friedrich Nicolai. In the second category fell the work of Denis Diderot, Jacques Necker, Johann Bernhard Basedow, and Georges-Louis Leclerc, Comte de Buffon. Catherine expressed some frustration with the economists she read for what she regarded as their impractical theories, writing in the margin of one of Necker's books that if it was possible to solve all of the state's economic problems in one day, she would have done so a long time ago. For information about particular nations that interested her, she read Jean Baptiste Bourguignon d'Anville's Memoirs de Chine to learn about the vast and wealthy Chinese empire that bordered her empire; François Baron de Tott's Memoires de les Turcs et les Tartares for information about the Ottoman Empire and the Crimean khanate; the books of Frederick the Great praising himself to learn about Frederick just as much as to learn about Prussia; and pamphlets written by Benjamin Franklin denouncing the British Crown to understand the reasons behind the American Revolution. In the third category fell the work of Voltaire, Friedrich Melchior, Baron von Grimm, Ferdinando Galiani, Nicolas Baudeau, and Sir William Blackstone. For philosophy, she liked books promoting what has been called "enlightened despotism", which she embraced as her ideal of an autocratic but reformist government that operated according to the rule of law, not the whims of the ruler, hence her interest in Blackstone's legal commentaries.

Within a few months of her accession in 1762, having heard the French government threatened to stop the publication of the famous French Encyclopédie on account of its irreligious spirit, Catherine proposed to Diderot that he should complete his great work in Russia under her protection. Four years later, in 1766, she endeavoured to embody in legislation the principles of Enlightenment she learned from studying the French philosophers. She called together at Moscow a Grand Commission—almost a consultative parliament—composed of 652 members of all classes (officials, nobles, burghers, and peasants) and of various nationalities. The commission had to consider the needs of the Russian Empire and the means of satisfying them. The empress prepared the "Instructions for the Guidance of the Assembly", pillaging (as she frankly admitted) the philosophers of Western Europe, especially Montesquieu and Cesare Beccaria. As many of the democratic principles frightened her more moderate and experienced advisors, she refrained from immediately putting them into practice. After holding more than 200 sittings, the so-called Commission dissolved without getting beyond the realm of theory.

Catherine began issuing codes to address some of the modernisation trends suggested in her Nakaz. In 1775, the empress decreed a Statute for the Administration of the provinces of the Russian Empire. The statute sought to govern Russia efficiently by increasing population and dividing the country into provinces and districts. By the end of her reign, 50 provinces and nearly 500 districts were created, government officials numbering more than double this were appointed, and spending on local government increased sixfold. In 1785, Catherine conferred on the nobility the Charter to the Nobility, increasing the power of the landed oligarchs. Nobles in each district elected a Marshal of the Nobility, who spoke on their behalf to the monarch on issues of concern to them, mainly economic ones. In the same year, Catherine issued the Charter of the Towns, which distributed all people into six groups as a way to limit the power of nobles and create a middle estate. Catherine also issued the Code of Commercial Navigation and Salt Trade Code of 1781, the Police Ordinance of 1782, and the Statute of National Education of 1786. In 1777, the empress described to Voltaire her legal innovations within a backward Russia as progressing "little by little".

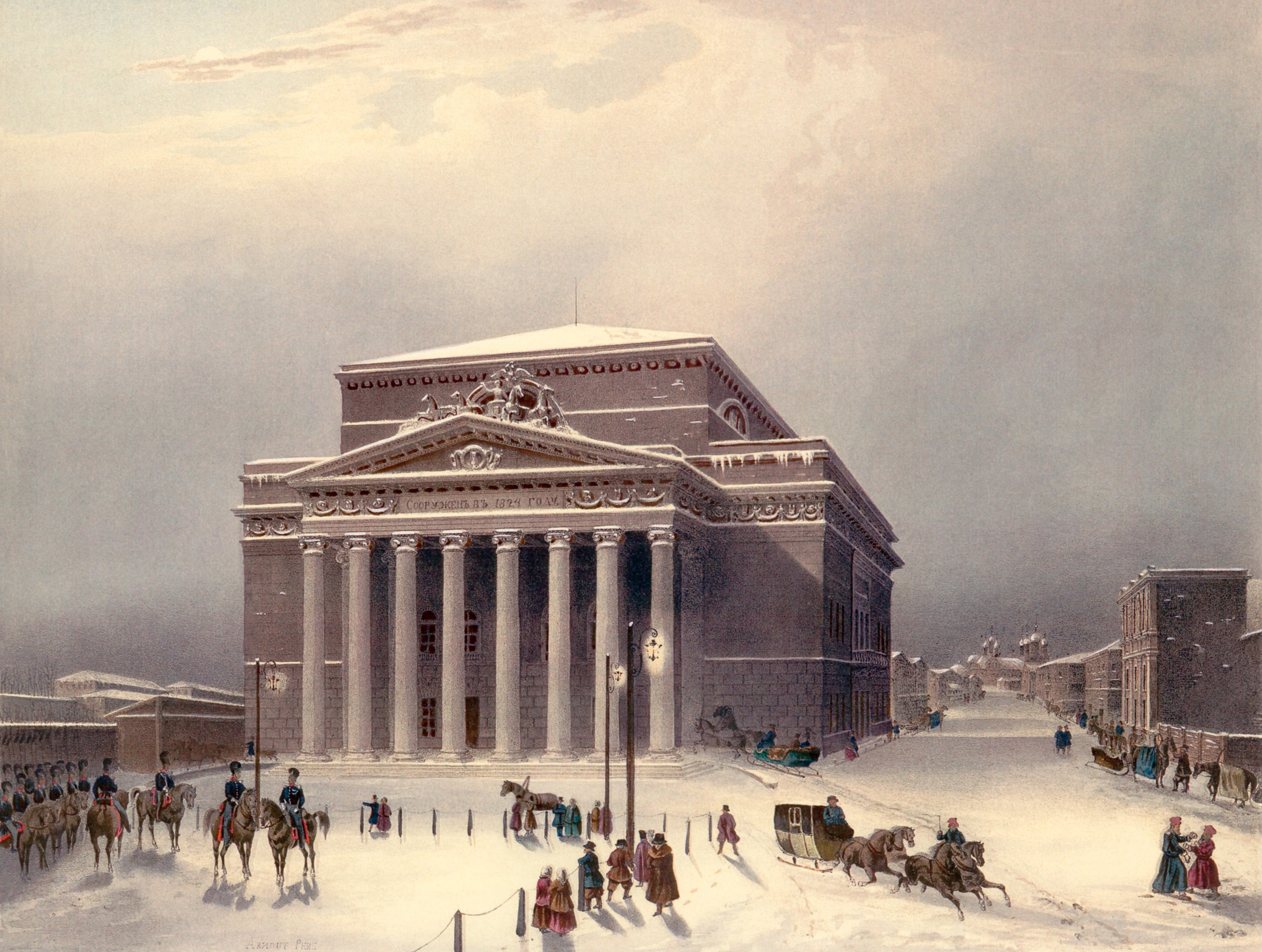
The Bolshoi Theatre in the early 19th century

During Catherine's reign, Russians imported and studied the classical and European influences that inspired the Russian Enlightenment. Gavrila Derzhavin, Denis Fonvizin and Ippolit Bogdanovich laid the groundwork for the great writers of the 19th century, especially for Alexander Pushkin. Catherine became a great patron of Russian opera. Alexander Radishchev published his Journey from St. Petersburg to Moscow in 1790, shortly after the start of the French Revolution. He warned of uprisings in Russia because of the deplorable social conditions of the serfs. Catherine decided it promoted the dangerous poison of the French Revolution. She had the book burned and the author exiled to Siberia.

Catherine also received Elisabeth Vigée Le Brun at her Tsarskoye Selo residence in St Petersburg, who painted several members of her court. Madame Vigée Le Brun vividly describes the empress in her memoirs:

the sight of this famous woman so impressed me that I found it impossible to think of anything: I could only stare at her. Firstly I was very surprised at her small stature; I had imagined her to be very tall, as great as her fame. She was also very fat, but her face was still beautiful, and she wore her white hair up, framing it perfectly. Her genius seemed to rest on her forehead, which was both high and wide. Her eyes were soft and sensitive, her nose quite Greek, her colour high and her features expressive. She addressed me immediately in a voice full of sweetness, if a little throaty: "I am delighted to welcome you here, Madame, your reputation runs before you. I am very fond of the arts, especially painting. I am no connoisseur, but I am a great art lover."

Madame Vigée Le Brun also describes the empress at a gala:

The double doors opened and the Empress appeared. I have said that she was quite small, and yet on the days when she made her public appearances, with her head held high, her eagle-like stare and a countenance accustomed to command, all this gave her such an air of majesty that to me she might have been Queen of the World; she wore the sashes of three orders, and her costume was both simple and regal; it consisted of a muslin tunic embroidered with gold fastened by a diamond belt, and the full sleeves were folded back in the Asiatic style. Over this tunic she wore a red velvet dolman with very short sleeves. The bonnet which held her white hair was not decorated with ribbons, but with the most beautiful diamonds.

Russia's second ballet school, Moscow State Academy of Choreography, commonly known as The Bolshoi Ballet Academy, was founded during Catherine's reign on 23 December 1773. It entered into a contract with the Italian teacher-choreographer Filippo Becari, who was to select "the most capable of dancing" children to learn "to dance with all possible precision and to show themselves publicly in all pantomime ballets".

=== Education ===
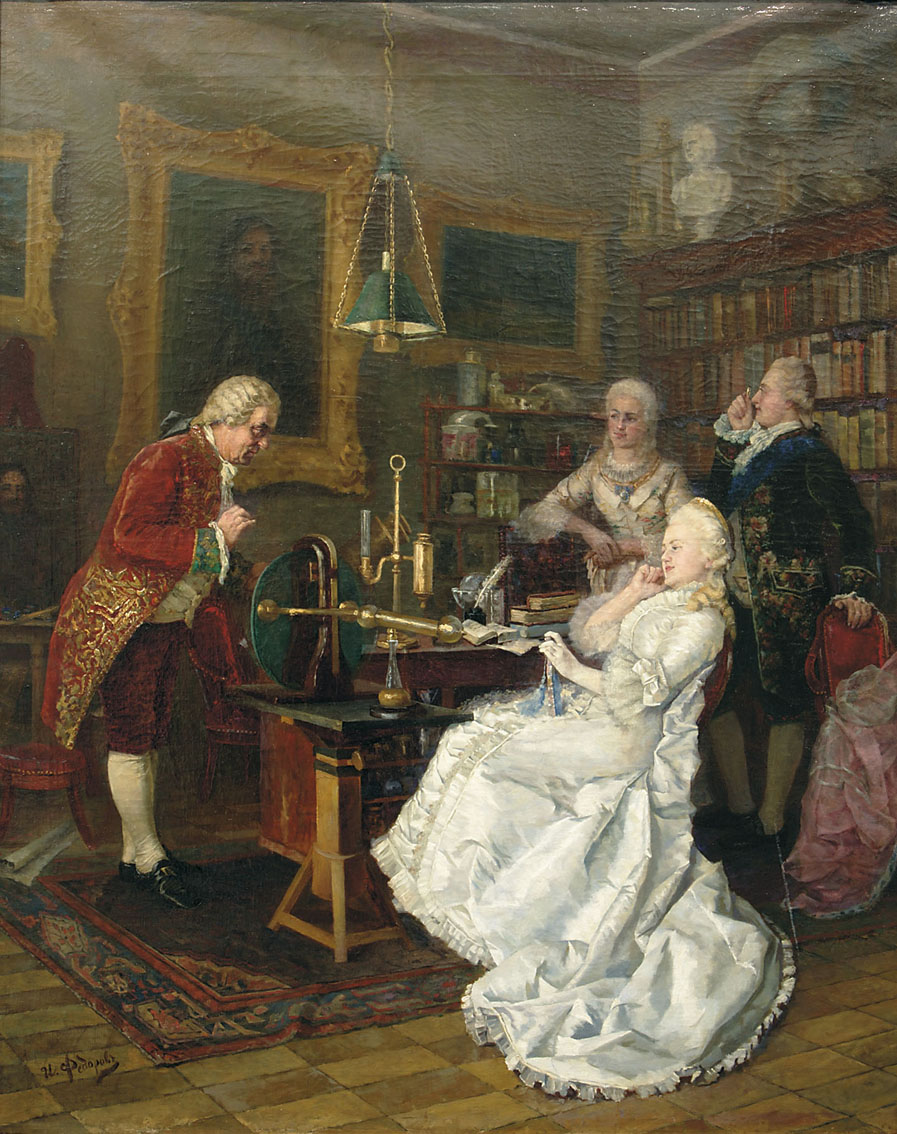
Catherine visits Russian scientist Mikhail Lomonosov, by Ivan Kuzmich Fedorov, 1880s

Catherine held western European philosophies and culture close to her heart, and she wanted to surround herself with like-minded people within Russia. She believed a 'new kind of person' could be created by inculcating Russian children with European education. Catherine believed education could change the hearts and minds of the Russian people and turn them away from backwardness. This meant developing individuals both intellectually and morally, providing them knowledge and skills, and fostering a sense of civic responsibility. Her goal was to modernise education across Russia.

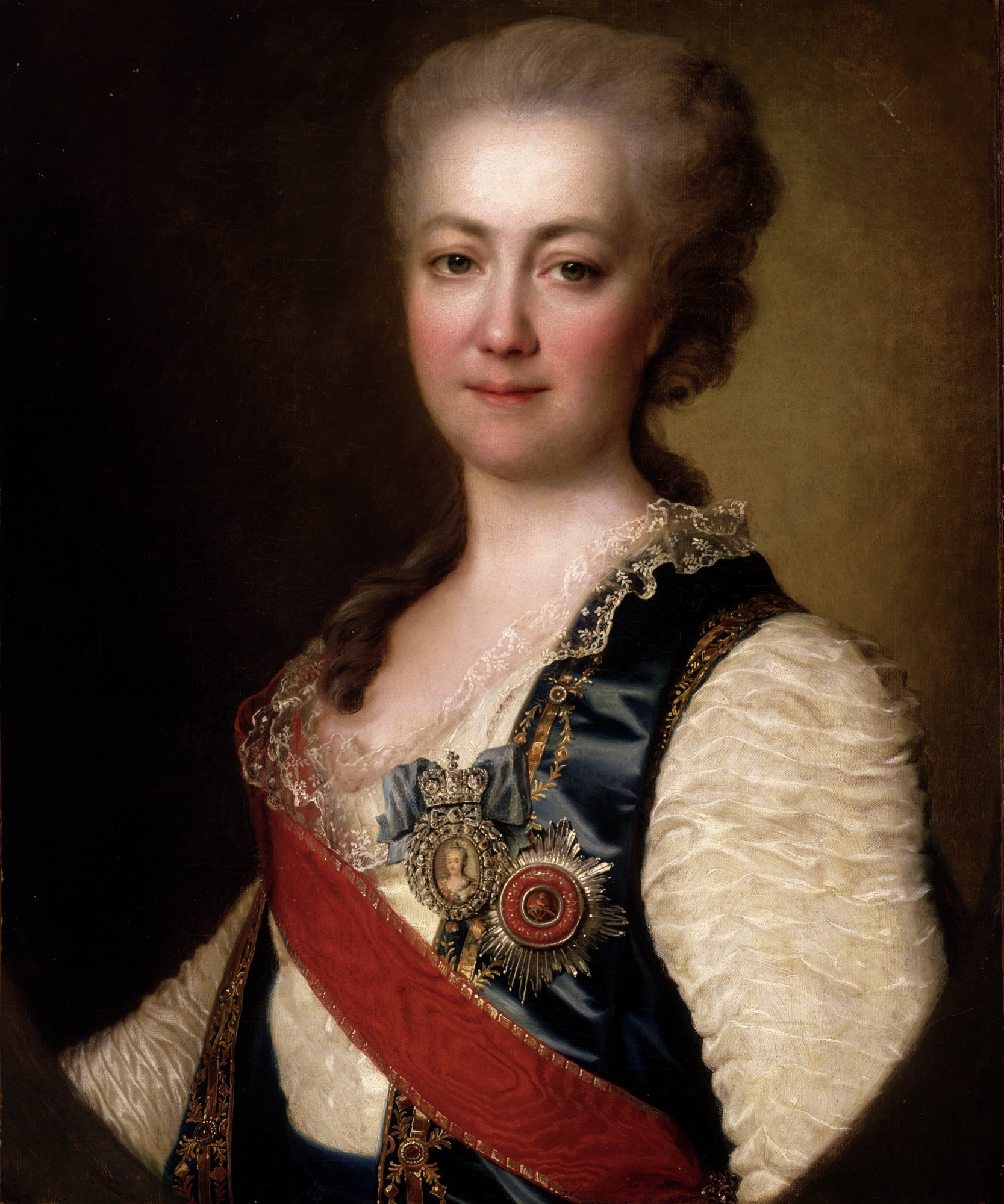
Yekaterina Vorontsova-Dashkova, the closest female friend of Empress Catherine and a major figure of the Russian Enlightenment

Catherine appointed Ivan Betskoy as her advisor on educational matters. Through him, she collected information from Russia and other countries about educational institutions. She also established a commission composed of T. N. Teplov, T. von Klingstedt, F. G. Dilthey, and the historian G. Muller. She consulted British pedagogical pioneers, particularly the Rev. Daniel Dumaresq and Dr. John Brown. In 1764, she sent for Dumaresq to come to Russia and then appointed him to the educational commission. The commission studied the reform projects previously installed by I. I. Shuvalov under Elizabeth and under Peter III. They submitted recommendations for the establishment of a general system of education for all Russian orthodox subjects from the age of 5 to 18, excluding serfs. However, no action was taken on any recommendations put forth by the commission due to the calling of the Legislative Commission. In July 1765, Dumaresq wrote to Dr. John Brown about the commission's problems and received a long reply containing very general and sweeping suggestions for education and social reforms in Russia. Dr. Brown argued, in a democratic country, education ought to be under the state's control and based on an education code. He also placed great emphasis on the "proper and effectual education of the female sex"; two years prior, Catherine had commissioned Ivan Betskoy to draw up the General Programme for the Education of Young People of Both Sexes. This work emphasised the fostering of the creation of a 'new kind of people' raised in isolation from the damaging influence of a backward Russian environment. The Establishment of the Moscow Foundling Home (Moscow Orphanage) was the first attempt at achieving that goal. It was charged with admitting destitute and extramarital children to educate them in any way the state deemed fit. Because the Moscow Foundling Home was not established as a state-funded institution, it represented an opportunity to experiment with new educational theories. However, the Moscow Foundling Home was unsuccessful, mainly due to extremely high mortality rates, which prevented many of the children from living long enough to develop into the enlightened subjects the state desired.

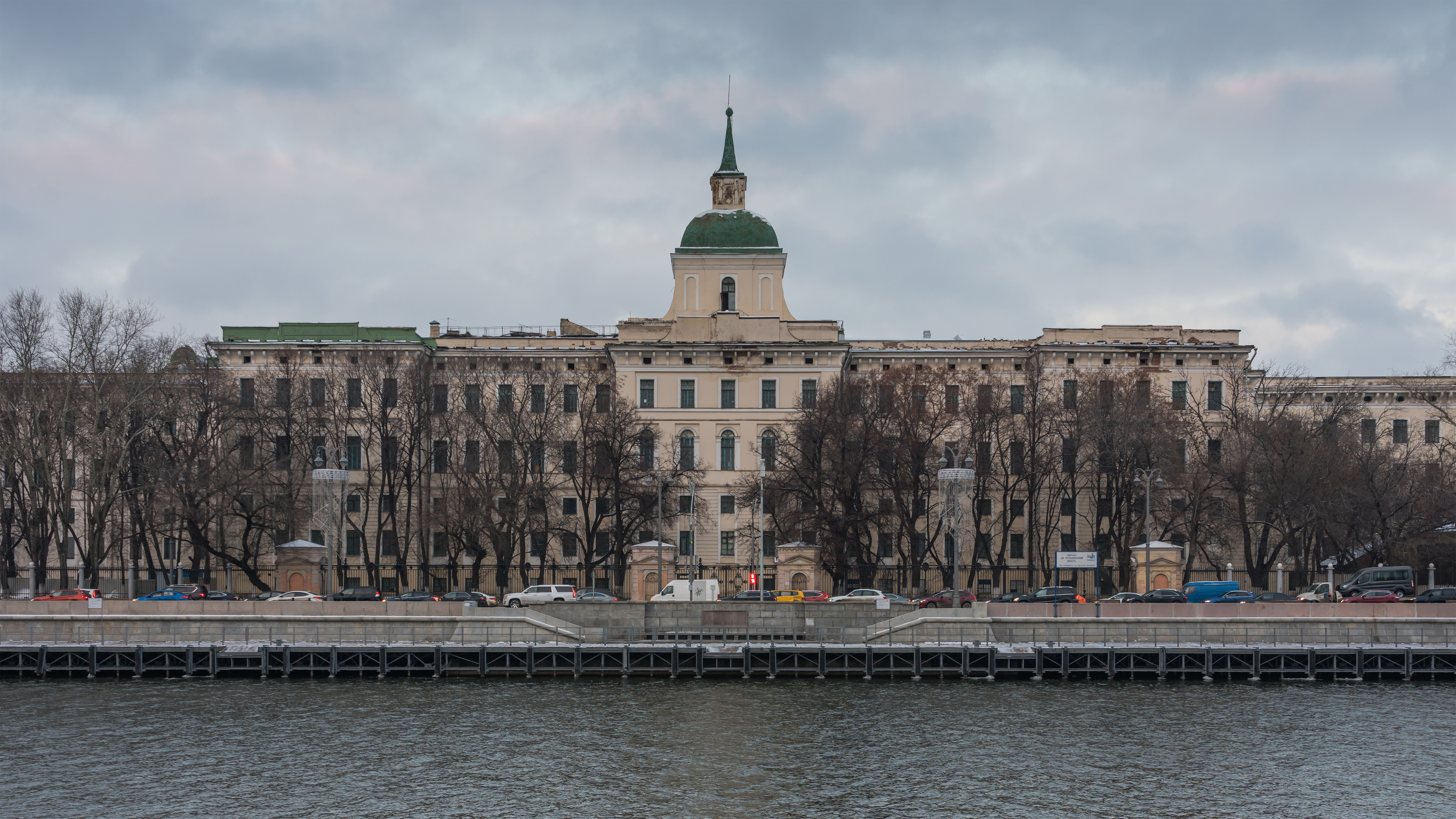
The Moscow Orphanage

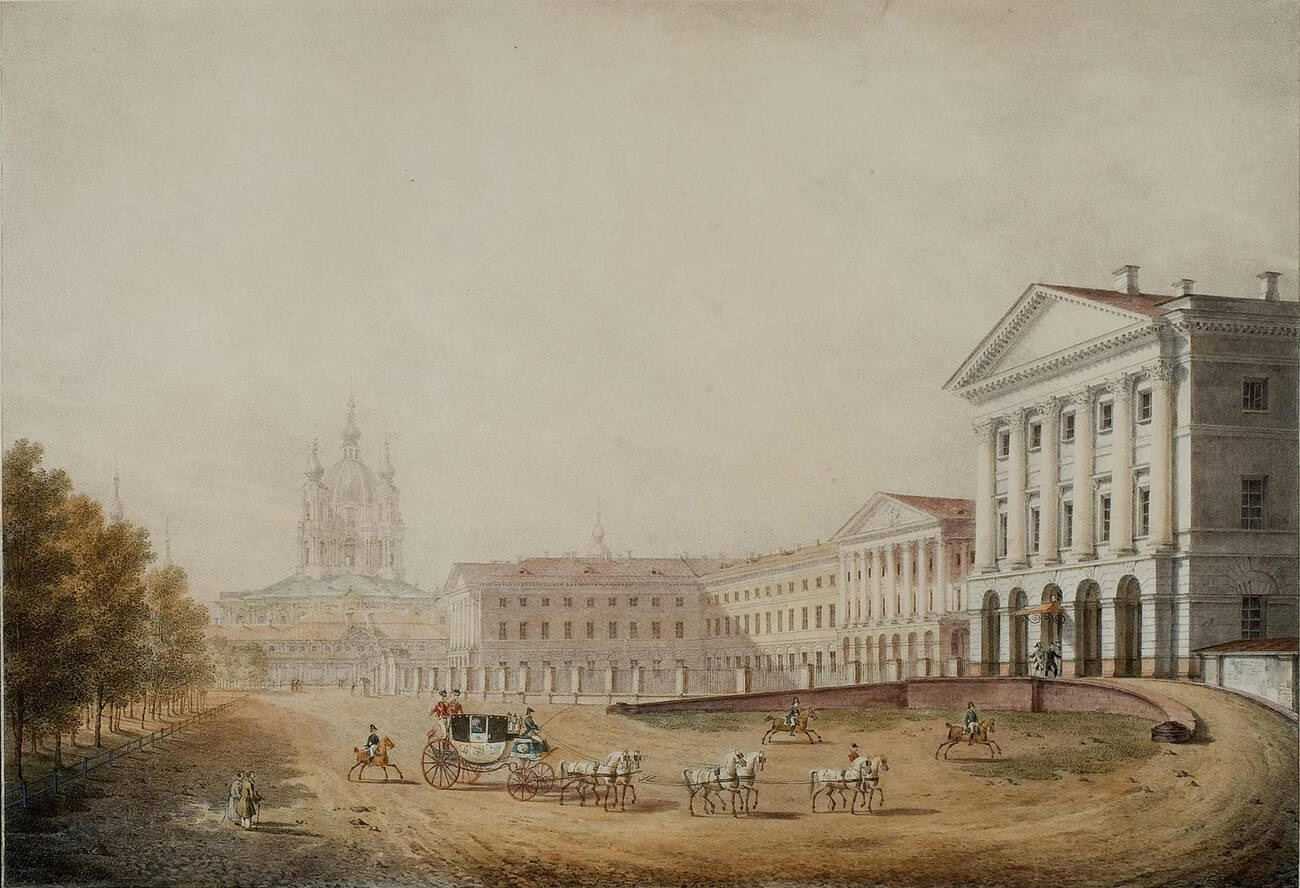
The Smolny Institute, the first Russian Institute for Noble Maidens and the first European state higher education institution for women

Not long after the Moscow Foundling Home, at the instigation of her factotum, Ivan Betskoy, she wrote a manual for the education of young children, drawing from the ideas of John Locke, and founded the famous Smolny Institute in 1764, first of its kind in Russia. At first, the institute only admitted young girls of the noble elite, but eventually it began to admit girls of the petit-bourgeoisie as well. The girls who attended the Smolny Institute, Smolyanki, were often accused of being ignorant of anything that went on in the world outside the walls of the Smolny buildings, within which they acquired a proficiency in French, music, and dancing, along with a complete awe of the monarch. Central to the institute's philosophy of pedagogy was strict enforcement of discipline. Running and games were forbidden, and the building was kept particularly cold because too much warmth was believed to be harmful to the developing body, as was excessive play.

From 1768 to 1774, no progress was made in setting up a national school system. However, Catherine continued to investigate the pedagogical principles and practice of other countries and made many other educational reforms, including an overhaul of the Cadet Corps in 1766. The Corps then began to take children from a very young age and educate them until the age of 21, with a broadened curriculum that included the sciences, philosophy, ethics, history, and international law. These reforms in the Cadet Corps influenced the curricula of the Naval Cadet Corps and the Engineering and Artillery Schools. Following the war and the defeat of Pugachev, Catherine laid the obligation to establish schools at the guberniya—a provincial subdivision of the Russian empire ruled by a governor—on the Boards of Social Welfare set up with the participation of elected representatives from the three free estates.

Catherine II regarded education as an important instrument of state modernization, intellectual development and social improvement. Influenced by the ideas of the Enlightenment, she believed that education should cultivate not only practical knowledge and intellectual abilities but also moral character and civic responsibility. Her educational policies gradually developed from the reform of institutions serving the nobility and particular professional groups towards the establishment of a state-organized system of general education. The reforms of the 1780s laid the foundations for a nationwide network of public schools with standardized curricula, teacher training, textbooks and administrative supervision, marking an important stage in the development of public education in Russia.

Catherine's subsequent reforms increasingly emphasized general education administered by the state. The Statute on Provincial Administration of 1775 assigned responsibility for schools, hospitals, orphanages and other public institutions to provincial Boards of Public Welfare (приказы общественного призрения). These bodies provided an administrative framework for extending educational provision beyond the capitals. In 1781, Catherine issued a decree providing for the establishment of a municipal school in each district of Saint Petersburg, with the first school to be financed from her Cabinet's funds. The Presidential Library identifies this initiative as an early step towards the organization of a nationwide state educational system.

In September 1782, Catherine established the Commission for the Establishment of National Schools under the presidency of Pyotr Zavadovsky. The commission was responsible for developing a coordinated network of schools, preparing teaching materials, organizing teacher training and standardizing educational methods. Its work drew particularly upon the educational reforms of Austria and other Central European states. The Serbian-born educational reformer Fyodor Yankovich de Mirievo, who had experience with the Austrian school system, played a leading role in designing the new Russian curriculum and administrative arrangements. The proposals of the scientist Franz Aepinus also influenced the reform, particularly the organization of general education and the use of the vernacular rather than compulsory Latin instruction.

The implementation of the new system began in December 1783 with the establishment of the Main National School in Saint Petersburg and an associated institution for training teachers. A separate teachers' seminary subsequently developed from this arrangement. These institutions provided professional preparation for instructors who would serve in the expanding provincial school network. The commission also prepared textbooks, instructional manuals and regulations governing school administration, seeking to establish common teaching standards throughout the empire.

On 5 August 1786 (Old Style), Catherine approved the Statute of National Schools in the Russian Empire (Устав народным училищам в Российской империи), establishing a general legal and administrative framework for state-organized public education. The statute provided for two principal categories of schools: Main National Schools (главные народные училища) in provincial capitals and Minor National Schools (малые народные училища) in district towns. Minor schools offered a two-year elementary course, while main schools contained four successive classes with a complete course extending over five years. The first two classes of the main schools corresponded to the curriculum of the minor schools, allowing pupils to continue their education within the same system.

A significant feature of the reform was its provision for free public instruction open to children of different social estates, including both boys and girls, although serfs remained outside the generally admitted categories. Section 28 of the statute explicitly prohibited teachers from charging pupils tuition fees and required them not to neglect children from poor families. It instructed teachers to regard their pupils as future members of society. The legislation thus established free instruction and the treatment of pupils from less affluent households as principles of the new public school system.

The reform also substantially broadened the curriculum of general education. Elementary instruction included reading, writing, arithmetic, Russian grammar, drawing, Christian religious instruction and moral education. The higher classes of the main schools offered Russian and world history, geography, geometry, mechanics, physics, natural history and elements of civil architecture. Instruction was to be conducted in the native language, while Latin and other European languages could be offered as additional subjects. The inclusion of scientific and practical disciplines alongside history, languages and moral instruction reflected the effort to provide pupils with a broader education than the traditional elementary curriculum.

Although the new schools were administered by secular state institutions, religious teaching was not removed from the curriculum. Sections 2, 4 and 6 of the 1786 statute expressly prescribed instruction in the catechism, sacred history, Christian morality and explanations of the Gospels. The reform therefore transferred the organization and supervision of general public education to the state while retaining Christian religious instruction as one component of the school curriculum.

The statute also established detailed regulations for teaching methods, the organization of lessons, the duties of instructors and the supervision of schools. Teachers were supplied with approved textbooks and the Guide for Teachers, while school directors were required to maintain records and report regularly on educational progress, conduct and institutional needs. Main National Schools also provided instruction for prospective teachers of minor schools, connecting the expansion of the school network with the preparation of qualified teaching personnel. Provincial governors and Boards of Public Welfare exercised administrative supervision over the schools.

The development of the national school network can be traced through contemporary administrative statistics. According to a report compiled by the Commission of National Schools in 1801, the number of schools included in its records increased from 165 in 1786, with 11,088 pupils, to 316 in 1796, with 744 teachers and 17,341 pupils, including 1,121 girls. These figures demonstrate the expansion of the state school system during Catherine's reign, although its reach remained limited by financial resources, the availability of trained teachers, uneven geographical distribution and the exclusion of the serf population. Most rural inhabitants continued to have little access to formal schooling.

Although Catherine's reforms did not establish compulsory education, they created a legal, administrative and pedagogical foundation for the further development of Russia's public education system in the nineteenth century.

=== Printing, publishing, translation and censorship ===
During the reign of Catherine II, printing, publishing, translation and periodical literature expanded considerably, contributing to the development of the Russian Enlightenment. Catherine promoted the circulation of European literary, philosophical, historical and scientific works, sponsored translation projects and encouraged the development of private publishing. These developments gradually expanded the printing industry beyond the traditional dominance of the state, the Church and officially supported academic institutions, allowing private publishers and booksellers to play a greater role in Russian cultural life. Historian Lindsey Hughes has characterized the press during much of Catherine's reign as remarkably free, noting the absence of a central censorship authority and the relatively limited categories of prohibited material.

In 1768, Catherine established the Society Striving for the Translation of Foreign Books (Собрание, старающееся о переводе иностранных книг), providing an annual subsidy of 5,000 rubles from her personal funds. The society brought together translators, scholars and literary figures to produce Russian editions of important European works, with Catherine herself influencing the selection of texts. Between 1768 and 1783, the society published 112 translations, including selections from the French Encyclopédie, Montesquieu's The Spirit of Law, and works by Voltaire, Jean-Jacques Rousseau, Pierre Corneille and Jean Racine. Its activities contributed to the dissemination of European Enlightenment thought and the development of Russian as a language of philosophical, scientific and political discussion. Historian Yusuke Toriyama has examined the significance of Catherine's translation initiatives for the intellectual and linguistic development of eighteenth-century Russia.

The translation movement extended beyond institutions directly supported by the government. Translations of French, German and English literature, philosophical works, historical studies, scientific publications and educational texts became an increasingly important part of the Russian book market. According to research by historians Sergey Polskoy and Vladislav Rjéoutski, approximately 400 works were published in Russia in 1788, around four times the number published in 1762. More than 250 publications in 1788 were translations, representing approximately 62 per cent of the year's total output. Translated literature thus accounted for a growing proportion of Russian publishing during Catherine's reign, reflecting the expansion of the book market and the circulation of foreign intellectual works.

Catherine also participated directly in Russian literary journalism. In 1769, she contributed anonymously to the satirical journal Vsiakaia vsiachina (All Sorts and Sundries), which drew upon the traditions of European Enlightenment periodicals and discussed social customs, morality and human behaviour. The publication helped stimulate the expansion of Russian satirical journalism between 1769 and 1774. Nikolay Novikov published journals including Truten (The Drone) and Zhivopisets (The Painter), which criticized social abuses, corruption, the behaviour of the nobility and the treatment of serfs. Novikov's journals engaged in public literary disputes with Catherine's publication concerning the proper subjects and limits of satire. These controversies became important episodes in the development of Russian literary and public debate.

The growth of publishing was accompanied by increasing diversification in periodical literature and its readership. In 1779, Novikov published Modnoe ezhemesiachnoe izdanie, ili Biblioteka dlia damskogo tualeta (Fashionable Monthly Publication, or the Library for Ladies' Toilettes), an early Russian periodical specifically intended for women, containing literary works and illustrations of contemporary fashions. The journal Sobesednik liubitelei rossiiskogo slova (Companion of Lovers of the Russian Word, 1783–1784), associated with Yekaterina Vorontsova-Dashkova and Catherine herself, provided another forum for literary and philosophical discussion. From 1785 to 1789, Novikov published Detskoe chtenie dlia serdtsa i razuma (Children's Reading for Heart and Mind), generally regarded as Russia's first children's magazine. It included literary works, translations, historical and scientific articles, and educational material. These publications reflected the emergence of more specialized periodicals and the diversification of Russian reading culture.

A major institutional reform came on 15 January 1783 (26 January, New Style), when Catherine issued the Decree on Free Printing Houses (Указ о вольных типографиях). The decree permitted private individuals to establish printing houses in Saint Petersburg, Moscow and other cities throughout the Russian Empire without obtaining individual government privileges. Printing establishments were legally placed on a similar footing to other manufacturing and commercial enterprises. Individuals wishing to establish a printing house were generally required to notify the local police authorities rather than seek a special governmental concession. The decree explicitly permitted the printing of books in Russian and foreign languages, including Oriental languages. Although privately operated presses had previously been authorized in individual cases, including establishments founded in the 1770s, the legislation of 1783 extended permission to establish printing houses through a general legal provision.

The legislation encouraged the expansion of commercial printing and private publishing. Within several years, Saint Petersburg alone had approximately twenty private printing houses. Among the largest was the establishment operated by Johann Karl Schnoor, which produced more than 230 Russian-language publications. In Moscow, Novikov became one of the leading figures in commercial publishing, operating or managing several printing establishments, including the Moscow University press, which he leased, as well as privately operated presses. Private publishers produced a wide variety of works, including literature, textbooks, philosophical and historical publications, popular fiction, practical manuals and materials for domestic education. The growing participation of private entrepreneurs, writers and booksellers broadened the production and circulation of printed works beyond traditional governmental and academic institutions.

The liberalization of printing did not amount to the complete abolition of censorship. Under the 1783 decree, local police authorities retained responsibility for examining publications and preventing the circulation of material considered contrary to religious or civil law or public morality. Authorities were also empowered to confiscate publications produced in violation of these regulations. Nevertheless, censorship remained administratively decentralized, and Russia lacked a single central censorship authority during much of Catherine's reign. Hughes has described the comparatively permissive publishing environment of this period, while Gary Marker has examined the evolving relationship between private publishers, commercial printing and governmental supervision. The expansion of private publishing therefore took place within a system that combined broader freedom to establish printing enterprises with continuing regulation of printed content.

The development of private printing, translated literature, periodicals and commercial book distribution during Catherine's reign contributed to the expansion of Russian intellectual and literary culture. Historians have emphasized the importance of these changes in the emergence of private publishing and a more extensive market for books. The growth of translation and periodical literature also supported the circulation of scientific, educational and philosophical knowledge and the development of Russian as a literary and intellectual language.

=== Religious affairs ===
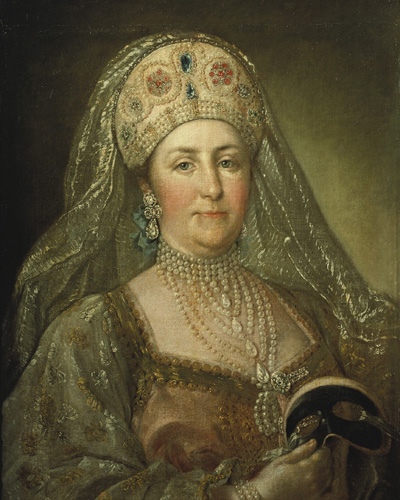
Catherine II in the Russian national costume

Catherine's apparent embrace of all things Russian (including Russian Orthodoxy) may have prompted her personal indifference to religion. She nationalised all of the Church lands to help pay for her wars, largely emptied the monasteries, and forced most of the remaining clergymen to survive as farmers or from fees for baptisms and other services. Very few members of the nobility entered the Church, which became even less important than it had been. She did not allow dissenters to build chapels, and she suppressed religious dissent after the onset of the French Revolution.

==== Russian Orthodoxy ====
Catherine II's ecclesiastical policies continued and extended the restructuring of relations between the Russian state and the Russian Orthodox Church begun under Peter the Great. During the early eighteenth century, Peter had sought to place ecclesiastical administration and property under greater state supervision. In 1701, he re-established the Monastery Office to administer ecclesiastical estates and revenues, while the Spiritual Regulation of 1721 replaced the patriarchate with the Most Holy Synod, integrating the central administration of the Church into the imperial governmental system. Nevertheless, the Church continued to possess extensive landed estates, dependent peasants and considerable economic resources. The question of ecclesiastical property and its relationship to state administration remained unresolved throughout the following decades.

In 1744, however, Elizabeth of Russia partially reversed this policy by abolishing the College of Economy and restoring the administration of ecclesiastical and monastic estates and their revenues to the Most Holy Synod.

In 1762, Peter III attempted to transfer ecclesiastical estates to state administration. Upon her accession, Catherine initially suspended these measures and temporarily restored the management of Church property to ecclesiastical authorities. She subsequently established a commission composed of clerical and secular officials to examine the condition of Church estates, determine the financial requirements of dioceses and monasteries, and prepare a more systematic reorganization. The commission operated under Catherine's direct authority and drew upon the ecclesiastical legislation of Peter the Great. In May 1763, the government established the Collegium of Economy (Коллегия экономии), which was entrusted with the administration and financial reorganization of Church estates.

On 26 February 1764 (Old Style), Catherine formally promulgated the decree secularizing the landed property of the Russian Orthodox Church. The legislation transferred estates belonging to the Holy Synod, episcopal households and monasteries to the state treasury, placing them under the administration of the Collegium of Economy. According to contemporary revision records, the measure concerned approximately 8.5 million desyatinas of land and more than 911,000 registered male ecclesiastical peasants, representing a total dependent population of approximately two million when their families are included. The reform was one of the most extensive transfers of landed property and administrative jurisdiction undertaken by the Russian state during the eighteenth century.

An important social consequence of the reform was the transformation of the legal and administrative status of the former ecclesiastical peasants. Previously dependent upon bishops and monasteries, they were reorganized into the category of economic peasants (экономические крестьяне), administered by the state. Their former obligations to ecclesiastical landlords, including labour services and various payments in kind, were replaced by a standardized monetary payment to the treasury. The 1764 legislation fixed this obligation at 1.5 rubles annually for each registered male peasant. Although the new arrangement did not eliminate all forms of dependency or state taxation, it ended the direct manorial authority of ecclesiastical landlords over a substantial rural population. These peasants subsequently became integrated into the broader category of state peasants.

The secularization also reorganized the financial administration of the Church. Instead of relying primarily upon income from extensive landed estates, monasteries and episcopal establishments retained under the new system were assigned financial support from the state treasury according to fixed institutional establishments. The government introduced classifications and standardized allowances for ecclesiastical institutions, separating the administration of their religious functions from the direct management of agricultural estates and dependent peasants. The reorganization concentrated the collection and management of former ecclesiastical revenues within the state fiscal system, while providing designated funds for the maintenance of qualifying dioceses and monasteries.

The reform was accompanied by a substantial reorganization of the monastery system. Existing monasteries were surveyed, classified and assigned new administrative and financial arrangements. Some smaller monasteries were amalgamated with other ecclesiastical establishments, while others were closed or removed from the list of institutions receiving regular state support. The authorities also reassigned a number of former monastic buildings to other purposes, including parish churches, schools, hospitals, almshouses and institutions for disabled persons. These measures formed part of a wider eighteenth-century tendency to bring property and institutions previously maintained by ecclesiastical endowments under the supervision of state administration and public welfare authorities.

The implementation of secularization extended beyond the territories covered by the original decree. The reorganization of ecclesiastical property was subsequently applied to additional regions of the empire, including Left-Bank Ukraine, where the secularization of Church estates was completed during the 1780s. In 1786, the Collegium of Economy was abolished, and the administration of the former ecclesiastical estates was transferred to provincial treasury chambers as part of the general system of state property management. The reform therefore developed from a measure concerning Church landownership into a broader reorganization of imperial fiscal and provincial administration.

The transfer of Church estates to secular administration did not abolish the religious position of the Orthodox Church or remove religious instruction from public education. Orthodoxy continued to occupy a prominent place in the empire's religious and social institutions. The Statute of National Schools of 1786 expressly retained instruction in Christian doctrine, the catechism, sacred history and Christian morality within state-administered schools. Catherine's reforms thus distinguished between ecclesiastical control over property and public administration, on the one hand, and the continued role of religion in education and social life, on the other.

The reform nevertheless altered the economic position of the clergy and the organization of monastic life. The loss of landed revenues reduced the independent resources of ecclesiastical institutions, and state allowances did not always compensate for their previous income. Some members of the clergy opposed the measures, while the restructuring of monasteries reduced the number of institutions maintained under official state establishments. At the same time, the reform introduced more uniform arrangements for Church finances, brought a large population of formerly ecclesiastical peasants under civil administration and incorporated substantial landed resources into the state fiscal system.

The secularization of 1764 brought to a conclusion a long-standing dispute between the Russian monarchy and the ecclesiastical hierarchy over landed property and administrative jurisdiction. It represented a further stage in the institutional changes initiated under Peter the Great and helped define the relationship between the Orthodox Church and the imperial state for much of the subsequent synodal period. Historian Gregory L. Freeze has examined these developments within the broader history of ecclesiastical administration, clerical organization and the changing relationship between Church and state in Imperial Russia. Catherine's reform was therefore significant not only as a transfer of ecclesiastical property but also as a restructuring of rural administration, public finances and the institutional organization of the Russian Orthodox Church.

However, in accord with her anti-Ottoman policy, Catherine promoted the protection and fostering of Christians under Turkish rule. She placed strictures on Catholics (ukaz of 23 February 1769), mainly Polish, and attempted to assert and extend state control over them in the wake of the partitions of Poland. For example, although Catholic parishes were allowed to retain their property and worship, papal oversight of parishes was restricted to only theology. In its stead, Catherine appointed a Catholic bishop (later raising the position to archbishop) of Mohylev to administer all Catholic churches in her territory. Nevertheless, Catherine's Russia provided an asylum and a base for regrouping to the Jesuits following the suppression of the Jesuits in most of Europe in 1773.

==== Islam ====
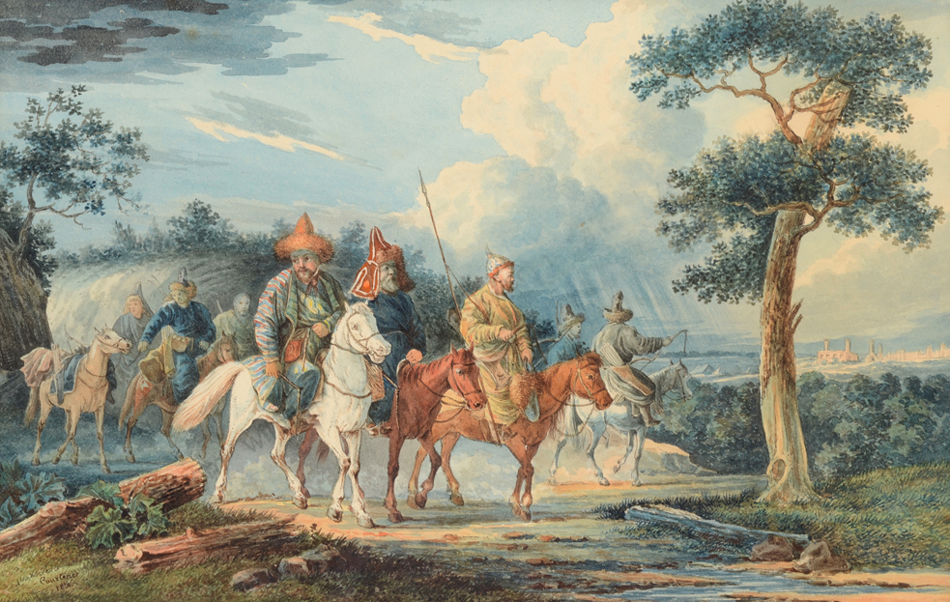
Bashkir riders from the Ural steppes

Catherine took many different approaches to Islam during her reign. She avoided force and tried persuasion (and money) to integrate Muslim areas into her empire. Between 1762 and 1773, Muslims were prohibited from owning any Orthodox serfs. They were pressured into Orthodoxy through monetary incentives. Catherine promised more serfs of all religions, as well as amnesty for convicts, if Muslims chose to convert to Orthodoxy. However, the Legislative Commission of 1767 offered several seats to people professing the Islamic faith. This commission promised to protect their religious rights, but did not do so. Many Orthodox peasants felt threatened by the sudden change, and burned mosques as a sign of their displeasure.

Catherine chose to assimilate Islam into the state rather than eliminate it when public outcry became too disruptive. After the "Toleration of All Faiths" Edict of 1773, Muslims were permitted to build mosques and practise all of their traditions, the most obvious of these being the pilgrimage to Mecca, which previously had been denied. Catherine created the Orenburg Muslim Spiritual Assembly to help regulate Muslim-populated regions as well as regulate the instruction and ideals of mullahs. The positions on the Assembly were appointed and paid for by Catherine and her government as a way of regulating religious affairs.

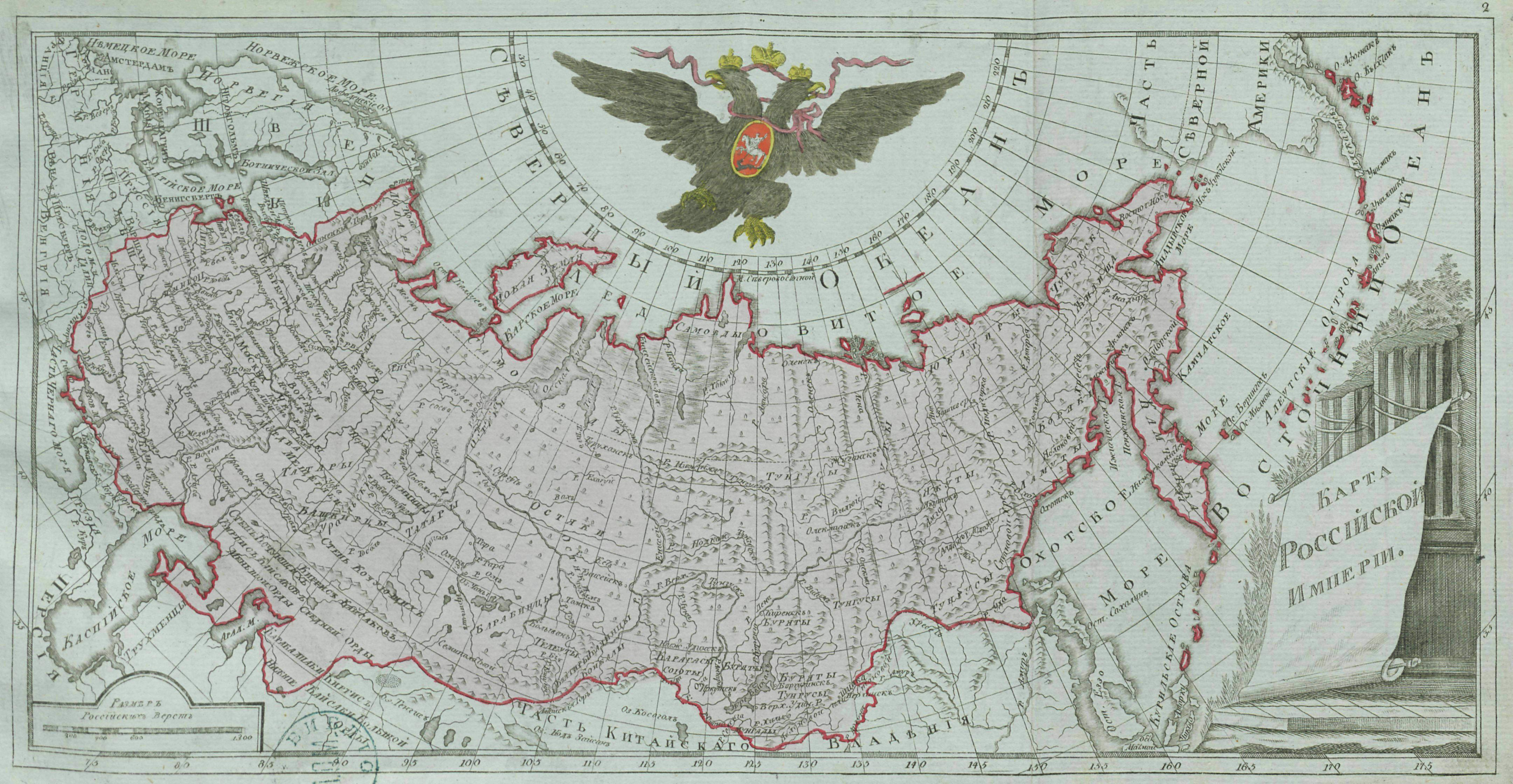
The Russian Empire in 1792

In 1785, Catherine approved the subsidising of new mosques and new town settlements for Muslims. This was another attempt to organise and passively control the outer fringes of her country. By building new settlements with mosques placed in them, Catherine attempted to ground many of the nomadic people who wandered through southern Russia. In 1786, she assimilated the Islamic schools into the Russian public school system under government regulation. The plan was another attempt to force nomadic people to settle. This allowed the Russian government to control more people, especially those who previously had not fallen under the jurisdiction of Russian law.

==== Judaism ====
Russia often treated Judaism as a separate entity, where Jews were maintained with a separate legal and bureaucratic system. Although the government knew that Judaism existed, Catherine and her advisers had no real definition of what a Jew is because the term meant many things during her reign. Judaism was a small, if not non-existent, religion in Russia until 1772. When Catherine agreed to the First Partition of Poland, the large new Jewish element was treated as a separate people, defined by their religion. Catherine separated the Jews from Orthodox society, restricting them to the Pale of Settlement. She levied additional taxes on the followers of Judaism; if a family converted to the Orthodox faith, that additional tax was lifted. Jewish members of society were required to pay double the tax of their Orthodox neighbours. Converted Jews could gain permission to enter the merchant class and farm as free peasants under Russian rule.

In an attempt to assimilate the Jews into Russia's economy, Catherine included them under the rights and laws of the Charter of the Towns of 1782. Orthodox Russians disliked the inclusion of Judaism, mainly for economic reasons. Catherine tried to keep the Jews away from certain economic spheres, even under the guise of equality; in 1790, she banned Jewish citizens from Moscow's middle class.

In 1785, Catherine declared Jews to be officially foreigners, with foreigners' rights. This re-established the separate identity that Judaism maintained in Russia throughout the Jewish Haskalah. Catherine's decree also denied Jews the rights of an Orthodox or naturalised citizen of Russia. Taxes doubled again for those of Jewish descent in 1794, and Catherine officially declared that Jews bore no relation to Russians.

==== Russian Orthodoxy ====
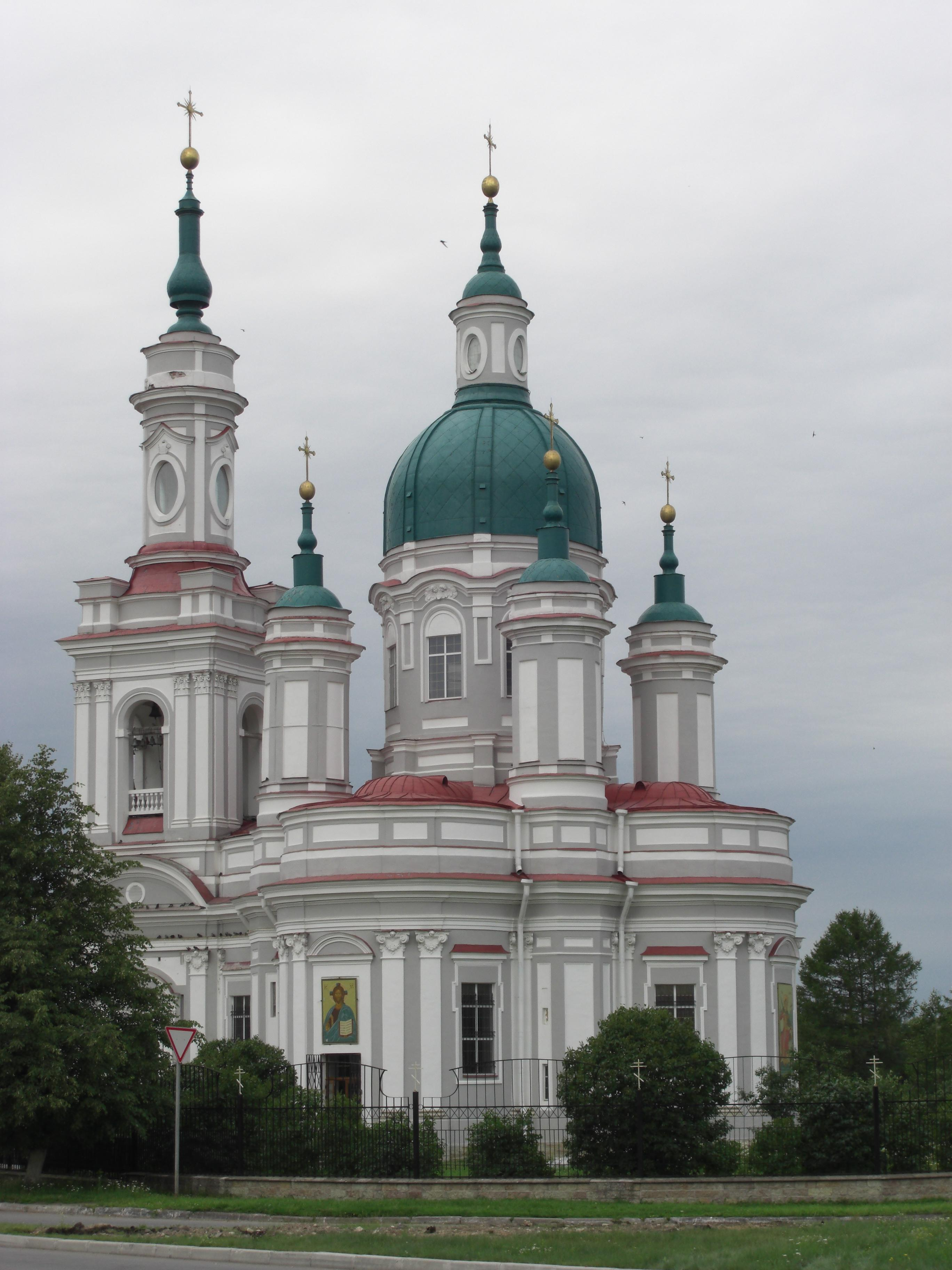
St. Catherine Cathedral in Kingisepp, an example of Late Baroque architecture

In many ways, the Russian Orthodox Church fared no better than its foreign counterparts during the reign of Catherine. Under her leadership, she completed what Peter III had started. The Church's lands were expropriated, and the budget of both monasteries and bishoprics were controlled by the Collegium of Accounting. Endowments from the government replaced income from privately held lands. The endowments were often much less than the original intended amount. She closed 569 of 954 monasteries, of which only 161 received government money. Only 400,000 roubles of Church wealth were paid back. While other religions (such as Islam) received invitations to the Legislative Commission, the Orthodox clergy did not receive a single seat. Their place in government was restricted severely during the years of Catherine's reign.

In 1762, to help mend the rift between the Russian Orthodox Church and a sect that called themselves the Old Believers, Catherine passed an act that allowed Old Believers to practice their faith openly without interference. While claiming religious tolerance, she intended to recall the Old Believers into the official Church. They refused to comply, and in 1764, she deported over 20,000 Old Believers to Siberia on the grounds of their faith. In later years, Catherine amended her thoughts. Old Believers were allowed to hold elected municipal positions after the Urban Charter of 1785, and she promised religious freedom to those who wished to settle in Russia.

Religious education was reviewed strictly. At first, she attempted to revise clerical studies, proposing a reform of religious schools. This reform never progressed beyond the planning stages. By 1786, Catherine excluded all religion and clerical studies programs from lay education. By separating the public interests from those of the Church, Catherine began a secularisation of the day-to-day workings of Russia. She transformed the clergy from a group that wielded great power over the Russian government and its people to a segregated community forced to depend on the state for compensation.

== Personal life ==
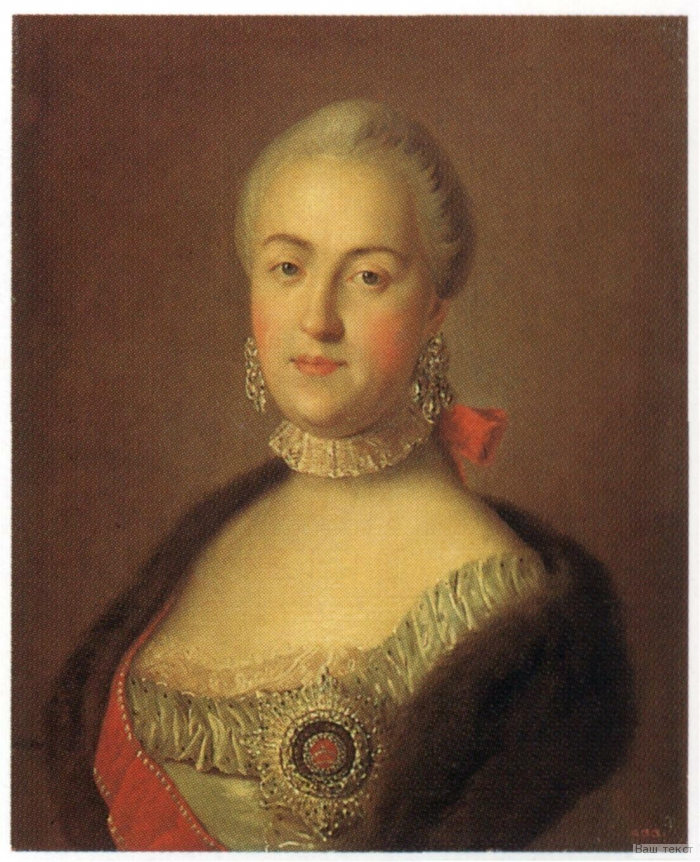
Empress Catherine the Great is popularly remembered for her sexual promiscuity.

Catherine, throughout her long reign, took many lovers, often elevating them to high positions for as long as they held her interest and then pensioning them off with gifts of serfs and large estates. The percentage of state money spent on the court increased from 10% in 1767 to 11% in 1781 to 14% in 1795. Catherine gave away 66,000 serfs from 1762 to 1772, 202,000 from 1773 to 1793, and 100,000 in one day: 18 August 1795. Catherine bought the support of the bureaucracy. In 1767, Catherine decreed that after seven years in one rank, civil servants automatically would be promoted regardless of office or merit.

After her affair with her lover and adviser Grigory Potemkin lost a lot of its passion in 1776, he allegedly selected a candidate-lover for her who had the physical beauty and mental faculties to hold her interest (such as Alexander Dmitriev-Mamonov and Nicholas Alexander Suk). She showed generosity towards her lovers, even after the affair ended. One of her lovers, Pyotr Zavadovsky, received 50,000 roubles, a pension of 5,000 roubles, and 4,000 peasants in Ukraine after she dismissed him in 1777. The last of her lovers, Platon Zubov, was 40 years her junior. Her sexual independence led to many of the legends about her.

Catherine kept her illegitimate son by Grigory Orlov (Alexis Bobrinsky, later elevated to Count Bobrinsky by Paul I) near Tula, away from her court.

The acceptance of a woman ruler was more of an issue among elites in Western Europe than in Russia. The British ambassador to Russia, James Harris, reported back to London that:

Her Majesty has a masculine force of mind, obstinacy in adhering to a plan, and intrepidity in the execution of it; but she wants the more manly virtues of deliberation, forbearance in prosperity and accuracy of judgment, while she possesses in a high degree the weaknesses vulgarly attributed to her sex—love of flattery, and its inseparable companion, vanity; an inattention to unpleasant but salutary advice; and a propensity to voluptuousness which leads to excesses that would debase a female character in any sphere of life.

=== Poniatowski ===
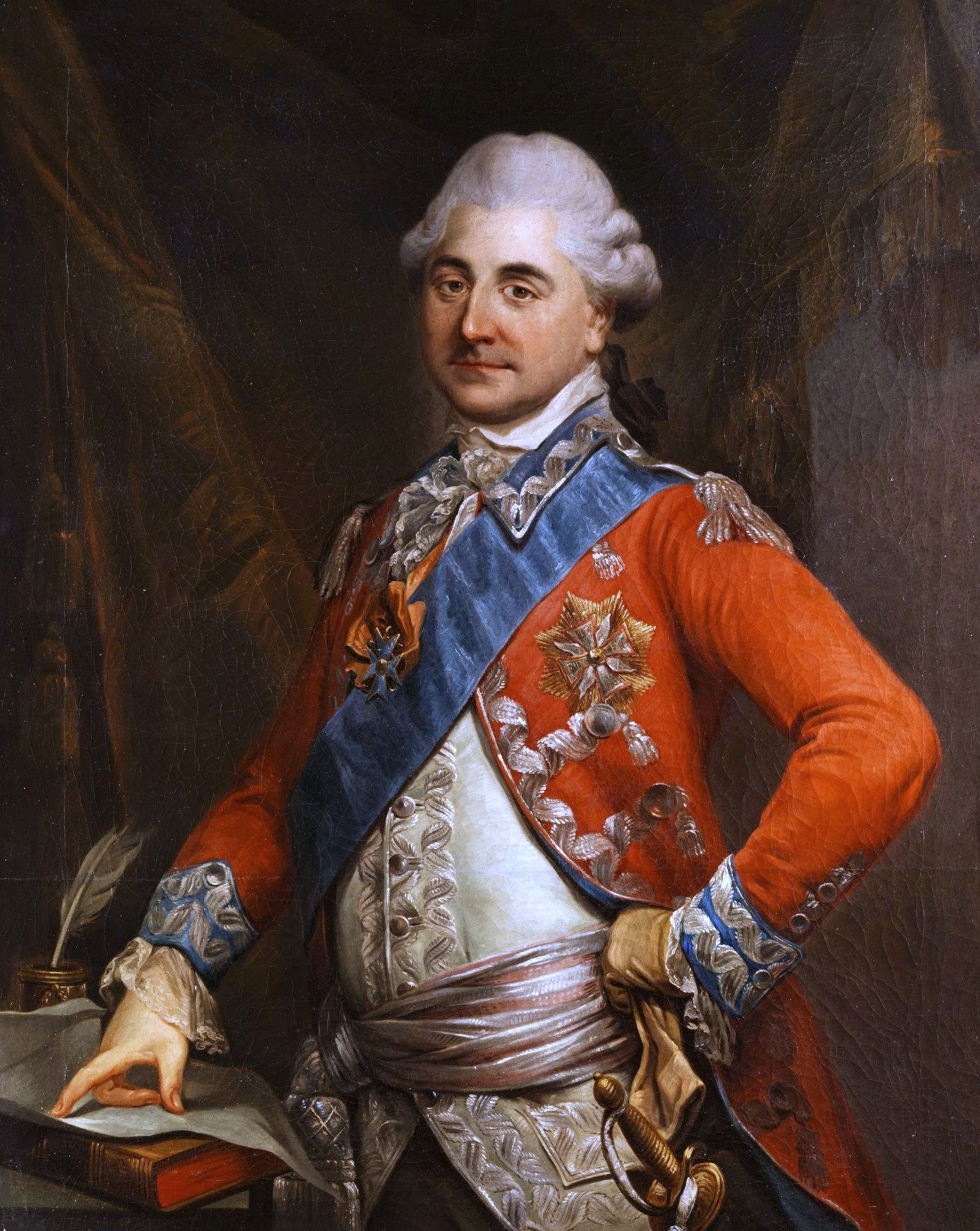
Stanisław August Poniatowski, a lover of Catherine who was elected ruler of Poland-Lithuania with her aid in 1764 (portrayed in 1786 by Bacciarelli)

Sir Charles Hanbury Williams, the British ambassador to Russia, offered Stanisław Poniatowski a place in the embassy in return for gaining Catherine as an ally. Poniatowski, through his mother's side, came from the Czartoryski family, prominent members of the pro-Russian faction in Poland; Poniatowski and Catherine were eighth cousins, twice removed, by their mutual ancestor King Christian I of Denmark, by virtue of Poniatowski's maternal descent from the Scottish House of Stuart. Catherine, 26 years old and already married to the then-Grand Duke Peter for some 10 years, met the 22-year-old Poniatowski in 1755, well before encountering the Orlov brothers. They had a daughter named Anna Petrovna in December 1757 (not to be confused with Grand Duchess Anna Petrovna of Russia, the daughter of Peter I's second marriage), although she was legally regarded as Grand Duke Peter's.

King Augustus III of Poland died in 1763, so Poland needed to elect a new ruler. Catherine supported Poniatowski as a candidate to become the next king. She sent the Russian army into Poland to avoid possible disputes. Russia invaded Poland on 26 August 1764, threatening to fight, and imposing Poniatowski as king. Poniatowski accepted the throne, and thereby put himself under Catherine's control. News of Catherine's plan spread, and Frederick II (others say the Ottoman sultan) warned her that if she tried to conquer Poland by marrying Poniatowski, all of Europe would oppose her. She had no intention of marrying him, having already given birth to Orlov's child and to the Grand Duke Paul by then.

Prussia (through the agency of Prince Henry), Russia (under Catherine), and Austria (under Maria Theresa) began preparing the ground for the partitions of Poland. In the first partition, 1772, the three powers split 52,000 km^{2} (20,000 sq mi) among them. Russia got territories east of the line connecting, more or less, Riga–Polotsk–Mogilev. In the second partition, in 1793, Russia received the most land, from west of Minsk almost to Kiev and down the river Dnieper, leaving some spaces of steppe down south in front of Ochakov, on the Black Sea. Later uprisings in Poland led to the third partition in 1795. Poland ceased to exist as an independent nation until its post-World War I reconstitution.

=== Orlov ===
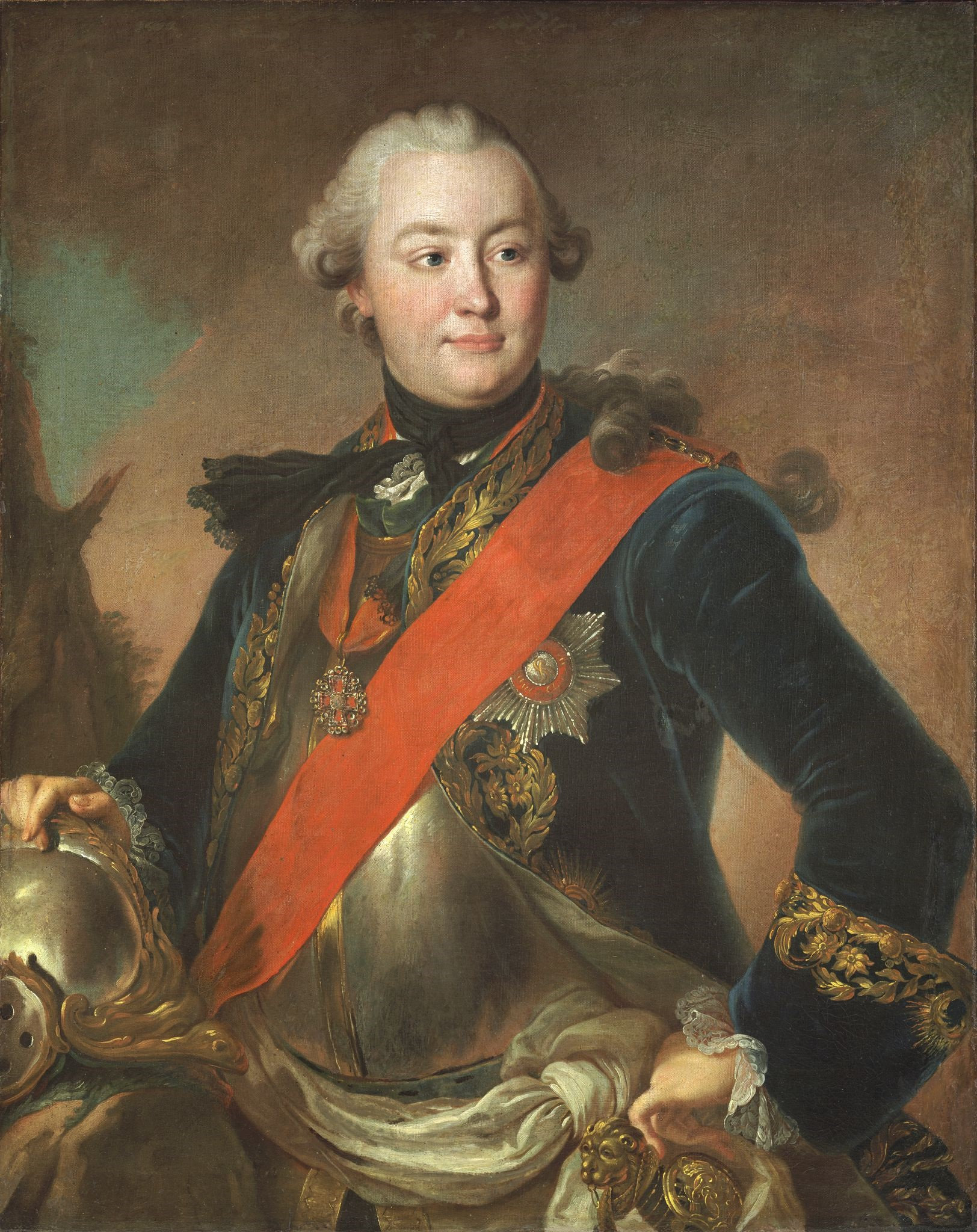
Count Grigory Orlov painted by Fyodor Rokotov, c. 1762–63

Grigory Orlov, the grandson of a rebel in the Streltsy uprising (1698) against Peter the Great, distinguished himself in the Battle of Zorndorf (25 August 1758), receiving three wounds. He represented an opposite to Peter's pro-Prussian sentiment, with which Catherine disagreed. By 1759, he and Catherine had become lovers; no one told Catherine's husband, Peter. Catherine saw Orlov as very useful, and he became instrumental in the 28 June 1762 coup d'état against her husband, but she preferred to remain the dowager empress of Russia rather than marrying anyone.

Orlov and his other three brothers found themselves rewarded with titles, money, swords, and other gifts, but Catherine did not marry Grigory, who proved inept at politics and useless when asked for advice. He received a palace in Saint Petersburg when Catherine became empress.

Orlov died in 1783. Their son, Aleksey Grygoriovich Bobrinsky (1762–1813), had one daughter, Maria Alexeyeva Bobrinsky (Bobrinskaya) (1798–1835), who married in 1819 the 34-year-old Prince Nikolai Sergeevich Gagarin (London, England, 1784–1842) who took part in the Battle of Borodino (7 September 1812) against Napoleon, and later served as ambassador in Turin, the capital of the Kingdom of Sardinia.

=== Potemkin ===
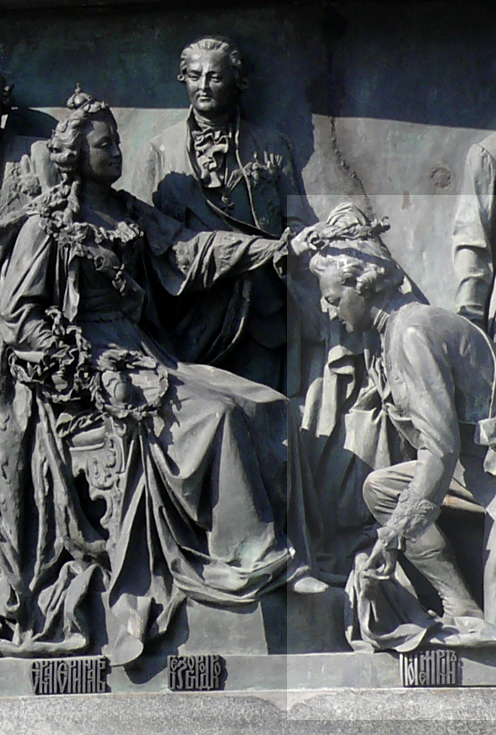
Catherine II and Prince Grigory Potemkin on the Millennium Monument in Novgorod

Grigory Potemkin was involved in the palace coup of 1762. In 1772, Catherine's close friends informed her of Orlov's affairs with other women, and she dismissed him. By the winter of 1773, Pugachev's Rebellion was starting to take root and Catherine's son Paul had started gaining support; both of these trends threatened her power. She called Potemkin for help—mostly military—and he became devoted to her.

In 1772, Catherine wrote to Potemkin. Days earlier, she had found out about an uprising in the Volga region. She appointed General Aleksandr Bibikov to put down the uprising, but she needed Potemkin's advice on military strategy. Potemkin quickly gained positions and awards. Russian poets wrote about his virtues, the court praised him, foreign ambassadors fought for his favour, and his family moved into the palace. He later became the de facto absolute ruler of New Russia, governing its colonisation.

In 1780, Emperor Joseph II, the son of Holy Roman Empress Maria Theresa, toyed with the idea of determining whether or not to enter an alliance with Russia, and asked to meet Catherine. Potemkin had the task of briefing him and travelling with him to Saint Petersburg. Potemkin also convinced Catherine to expand the universities in Russia to increase the number of scientists.

Catherine was worried that Potemkin's poor health would delay his important work in colonising and developing the south as he had planned. He died at the age of 52 in 1791.

== Final months and death ==
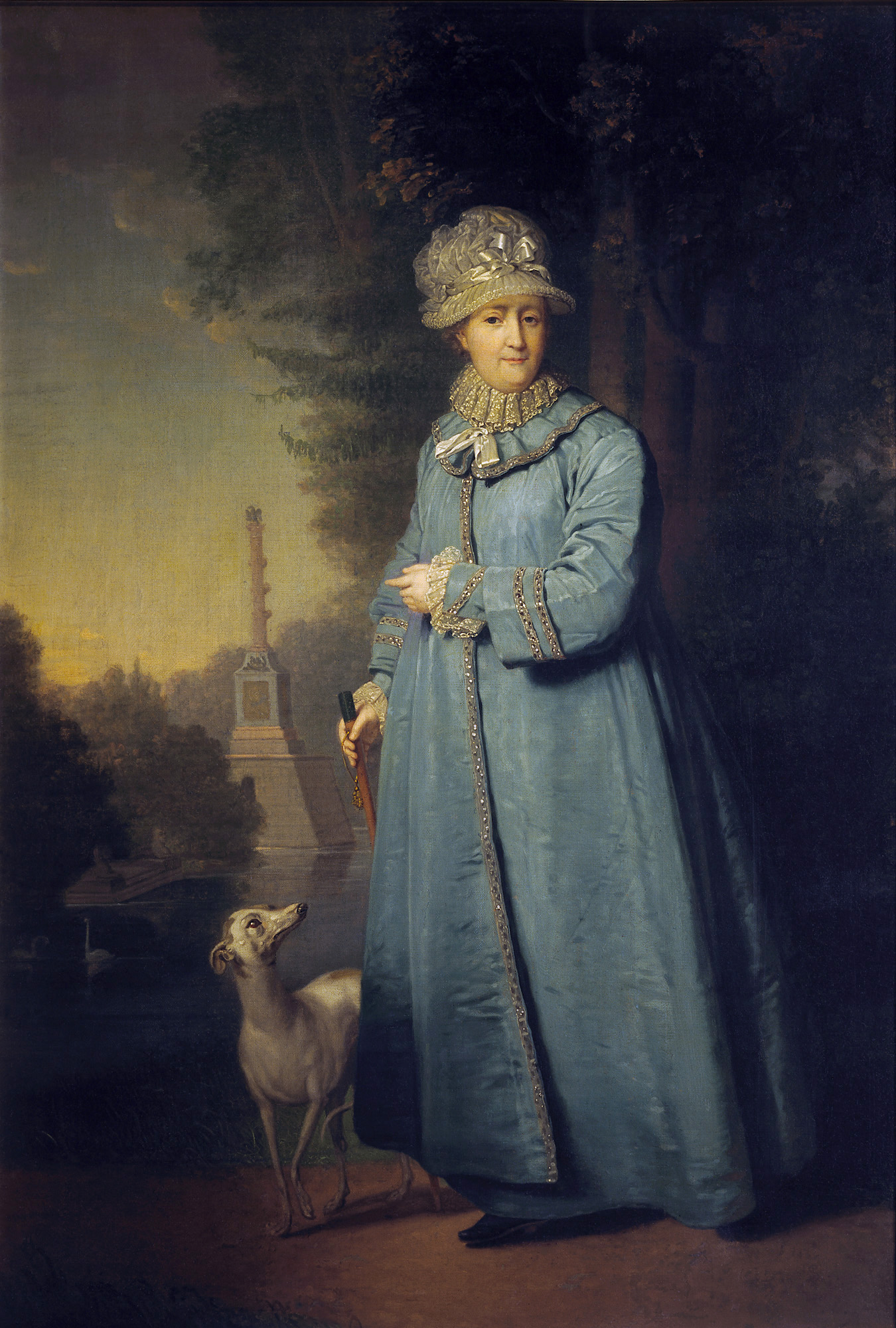
1794 portrait of Catherine, aged approximately 65, with the Chesme Column in the Catherine Park in Tsarskoye Selo in the background

Catherine's life and reign included many personal successes, but they ended in two failures. Her Swedish cousin (once removed), King Gustav IV Adolf, visited her in September 1796, the empress's intention being that her granddaughter Alexandra should become queen of Sweden by marriage. A ball was given at the imperial court on 11 September when the engagement was supposed to be announced. Gustav Adolph felt pressured to accept that Alexandra would not convert to Lutheranism, and though he was delighted by the young lady, he refused to appear at the ball and left for Stockholm. The frustration affected Catherine's health. She recovered well enough to begin to plan a ceremony which would establish her favourite grandson Alexander as her heir, superseding her difficult son Paul, but she died before the announcement could be made, just over two months after the engagement ball.

On 16 November [O.S. 5 November] 1796, Catherine rose early in the morning and had her usual morning coffee, soon settling down to work on papers; she told her lady's maid, Maria Perekusikhina, that she had slept better than she had in a long time. Sometime after 9:00 she was found on the floor with her face purplish, her pulse weak, her breathing shallow and laboured. The court physician diagnosed a stroke and despite attempts to revive her, she fell into a coma. She was given the last rites and died the following evening around 9:45. An autopsy confirmed a stroke as the cause of death.

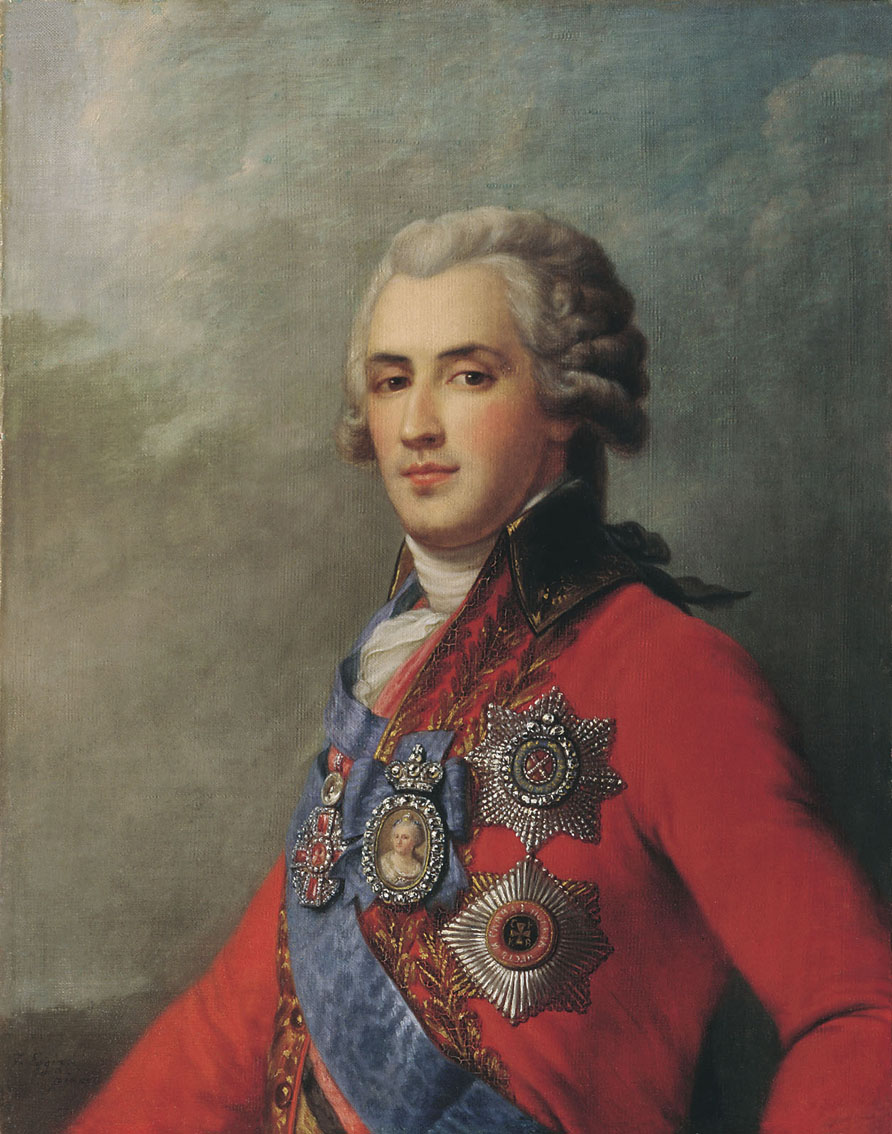
Catherine's last favourite, Platon Zubov

Later, several rumours circulated regarding the cause and manner of her death. The most famous of these rumors is that she died after committing bestiality with her horse. This rumor was widely circulated by satirical British and French publications at the time of her death. In his 1647 book Beschreibung der muscowitischen und persischen Reise (Description of the Muscovite and Persian journey), German scholar Adam Olearius alleged a supposed Russian tendency towards bestiality with horses. This was repeated in anti-Russian literature throughout the 17th and 18th centuries to illustrate the claimed barbarous Asian nature of Russia.

Catherine's undated will, discovered in early 1792 among her papers by her secretary Alexander Vasilievich Khrapovitsky, gave specific instructions should she die: "Lay out my corpse dressed in white, with a golden crown on my head, and on it inscribe my Christian name. Mourning dress is to be worn for six months, and no longer: the shorter the better." In the end, the empress was laid to rest with a gold crown on her head and clothed in a silver brocade dress. On 25 November, the coffin, richly decorated in gold fabric, was placed atop an elevated platform at the Grand Gallery's chamber of mourning, designed and decorated by Antonio Rinaldi.

According to Élisabeth Vigée Le Brun:

The empress's body lay in state for six weeks in a large and magnificently decorated room in the castle, which was kept lit day and night. Catherine was stretched on a ceremonial bed surrounded by the coats of arms of all the towns in Russia. Her face was left uncovered, and her fair hand rested on the bed. All the ladies, some of whom took turn to watch by the body, would go and kiss this hand, or at least appear to.

A description of the empress's funeral is written in Madame Vigée Le Brun's memoirs.

== Issue ==
Name	Lifespan	Notes
Miscarriage	20 December 1752	According to court gossip, this lost pregnancy was attributed to Sergei Saltykov.
Miscarriage	30 June 1753	This second lost pregnancy was also attributed to Saltykov; this time she was very ill for 13 days. Catherine later wrote in her memoirs: "...They suspect that part of the afterbirth has not come away ... on the 13th day it came out by itself".
Paul (I) Petrovich; Emperor of Russia	1 October 1754 – 23 March 1801 (aged 46)	Born at the Winter Palace, officially he was a son of Peter III but in her memoirs, Catherine implies very strongly that Saltykov was the biological father of the child, though she later retracted this. He married firstly Princess Wilhelmina Louisa of Hesse-Darmstadt in 1773 and had no issue. He married secondly, in 1776, Princess Sophie Dorothea of Württemberg and had issue, including the future Alexander I of Russia and Nicholas I of Russia. He succeeded as emperor of Russia in 1796 and was murdered at Saint Michael's Castle in 1801.
Anna Petrovna; Grand Duchess of Russia	9 December 1757 – 8 March 1759 (aged 1)	Possibly the offspring of Catherine and Stanislaus Poniatowski, Anna was born at the Winter Palace between 10 and 11 o'clock; she was named by Empress Elizabeth after her deceased sister, against Catherine's wishes. On 17 December 1757, Anna was baptised and received the Great Cross of the Order of Saint Catherine. Elizabeth served as godmother; she held Anna above the baptismal font and brought Catherine, who did not witness any of the celebrations, and Peter a gift of 60,000 rubles. Elizabeth took Anna and raised the baby herself, as she had done with Paul. In her memoirs, Catherine makes no mention of Anna's death on 8 March 1759, though she was inconsolable and entered a state of shock. Anna's funeral took place on 15 March, at Alexander Nevsky Lavra. After the funeral, Catherine never mentioned her dead daughter again.
Aleksey Grigorievich Bobrinsky; Count Bobrinsky	11 April 1762 – 20 June 1813 (aged 51)	Born at the Winter Palace, he was brought up at Bobriki; his father was Grigory Grigoryevich Orlov. He married Baroness Anna Dorothea von Ungern-Sternberg and had issue. Created Count Bobrinsky in 1796, he died in 1813.
Elizabeth Grigorieva Temkina (alleged daughter)	13 July 1775 – 25 May 1854 (aged 78)	Born many years after the death of Catherine's husband, brought up in the Samoilov household as Grigory Potemkin's daughter, and never acknowledged by Catherine, it has been suggested that Temkina was the illegitimate child of Catherine and Potemkin, but this is now regarded as unlikely.

== Title ==
The Manifesto of 1763 begins with Catherine's full titulature:

By the expedient grace of God, we, Catherine the Second, Empress and Autocrat of all Russia: of Muscovy, of Kiev, of Vladimir, and of Novgorod; Tsaritsa of Kazan, Tsaritsa of Astrakhan, and Tsaritsa of Siberia; Lady of Pskov and Grand Duchess of Smolensk; Duchess of Estonia and Livonia, of Karelia, of Tver, of Yugra, of Perm, of Vyatka and Bolgharia and others; Lady and Grand Duchess of the lands of Nizhniy Novgorod, of Chernigov, of Ryazan, of Rostov, of Yaroslavl, of Beloozero, of Udoria, of Obdoria, of Kondia, and overlord of the northern territories and sovereign over the lands of Iveria, over the Kartlian and Gruzian tsars and over the land of the Kabardians, over the Circassian and mountain princes, and of others the hereditary sovereign and possessor.

Another of her titles was "Mother of the Fatherland". She was often simply addressed as "Mother" (Russian: Матушка, romanized: Matushka), sometimes even by the court nobles instead of as "Your Majesty".

== Archives ==
Empress Catherine's correspondence with Frederick II Eugene, Duke of Württemberg, (the father of Catherine's daughter-in-law Maria Feodorovna) written between 1768 and 1795, is preserved in the State Archive of Stuttgart (Hauptstaatsarchiv Stuttgart) in Stuttgart, Germany.

== In popular culture ==
=== Literature ===
- Empress Catherine appears as a character in Lord Byron's unfinished mock-heroic poem Don Juan.
- She was a subject in The Royal Diaries series in the book Catherine: The Great Journey, Russia, 1743–1745 by Kristiana Gregory.

=== Film ===
- N. Aleksandrova portrayed Catherine in the Russian short silent film Princess Tarakanova (1910).
- Ellen Richter portrayed Catherine in German silent historical drama The Toy of the Tsarina (1919).
- Lucie Höflich portrayed Catherine in German silent historical film Catherine the Great (1920).
- Ernst Lubitsch's silent film Forbidden Paradise (1924) told the story of Catherine's romance with an officer.
- Marcelle Charles-Dullin portrayed Catherine in French silent film The Chess Player (1927).
- Suzanne Bianchetti portrayed Catherine in French historical drama film The Loves of Casanova (1927).
- Salka Stenermann portrayed Catherine in American sound (All-Talking) pre-Code drama film with fantasy elements Seven Faces (1929).
- Paule Andral portrayed Catherine in French historical drama film Tarakanova (1930).
- Marlene Dietrich portrayed Catherine the Great in the film The Scarlet Empress (1934).
- The Rise of Catherine the Great (1934) is a British historical film starring Elisabeth Bergner as Catherine and Douglas Fairbanks Jr. as Peter III.
- Suzy Prim portrayed Catherine in French-Italian historical film Princess Tarakanova (1938).
- Françoise Rosay portrayed Catherine in French historical drama film The Chess Player (1938).
- Brigitte Horney portrayed Catherine in German fantasy comedy Münchhausen (1943).
- Lubitsch remade his 1924 silent film as the sound film A Royal Scandal (1945), also known as Czarina.Catherine was portrayed by Tallulah Bankhead.
- Yvonne Sanson portrayed Catherine in Italian historical-adventure film The Mysterious Rider (1948).
- Viveca Lindfors portrayed Catherine in Italian drama film Tempest (1958), based on the novel The Captain's Daughter by Alexander Pushkin.
- Binnie Barnes portrayed Catherine in British-Italian historical drama film Shadow of the Eagle (1950).
- Isa Pola portrayed Catherine in Italian historical adventure film The Rival of the Empress (1951).
- Olga Zhiznyeva portrayed Catherine in Soviet historical war film Admiral Ushakov (1953).
- Bette Davis portrayed Catherine in American biographical adventure film John Paul Jones (1959).
- Hildegard Knef portrayed Catherine in biographical drama film Catherine of Russia (1963).
- Jeanne Moreau played a version of Catherine in the British comedy film Great Catherine (1968).
- Vija Artmane portrayed Catherine in Soviet historical drama film Pugachev (1978).
- Kristina Orbakaitė portrayed Catherine's journey to the throne as a side-plot in the Soviet film "Vivat, Gardes-Marines!!" (1991)
- Marina Vlady portrayed Catherine in Japanese-Russian period film Dreams of Russia (1992).
- Olga Antonova played the role of Catherine in the 2000 film The Captain's Daughter, based on the novel of the same name by Alexander Pushkin.
- Mariya Kuznetsova portrayed Catherine in experimental historical drama film Russian Ark (2002).
- Catherine Deneuve portrayed Catherine in Russian-Greek drama film God Loves Caviar (2012).
- Irina Pegova portrayed Catherine in Russian adventure comedy film The Crazy Empress (2025), in which Catherine the Great is accidentally transported to modern-day Saint Petersburg.

=== Television ===
- In live television broadcast by NBC of Shaw's play Great Catherine (1948) Catherine was portrayed by Gertrude Lawrence.
- In British live TV exhibition of Shaw's play Great Catherine (1953) Catherine was portrayed by Mary Ellis.
- In live UK presentation of Shaw's play Great Catherine (1958) Catherine was portrayed by Sydney Sturgess.
- In American series Meeting of Minds (1977-1981) Catherine is played by Jayne Meadows.
- In Soviet series Mikhaylo Lomonosov (1986) Catherine is played by Katrin Kohv.
- The British/Canadian/American TV miniseries Young Catherine (1991), starring Julia Ormond as Catherine and Vanessa Redgrave as Empress Elizabeth, is based on Catherine's early life.
- The television film Catherine the Great (1995) stars Catherine Zeta-Jones as Catherine and Jeanne Moreau as Empress Elizabeth.
- A teenage clone of Catherine the Great appears a recurring character in the American animated series Clone High (2002–2003), voiced by Murray Miller from "Escape to Beer Mountain: A Rope of Sand" until "Changes: The Big Prom: The Sex Romp: The Season Finale", and depicted as dating a clone of Julius Caesar. In the series' 2023 revival, Miller was recast with Dannah Phirman, and depicted as now dating a clone of Genghis Khan.
- In Russian historical drama series The Favorite (2005) Catherine is played by Natalya Surkova.
- In British sketch comedy show Psychobitches (2012-2014) Catherine is played by Frances Barber.
- Her rise to power and reign are portrayed in the Russia-1 television series Ekaterina (2014-2023). Catherine is portrayed by Marina Aleksandrova.
- The Channel One Russia television series Catherine the Great was released in 2015. Second season of the series was released in 2023. Catherine is portrayed by Yuliya Snigir (Season 1) and by Elizaveta Boyarskaya (Season 2).
- The television miniseries Catherine the Great (2019) stars Helen Mirren.
- Catherine was portrayed by Elle Fanning in the Hulu television series The Great (2020–2023).

=== Documentaries ===
Russian historical documentary film Catherine the Great (2025); the third film in the Rus' franchise. The role of Catherine II was played by three actresses: Anna Mikhalkova, Olga Lerman and Nina Kucheruk.

=== Theatre and music ===
- Catherine appears in Le congrès des rois (The Congress of the Kings), French Revolutionary opera of the genre comédie mêlée d'ariettes with a libretto by Antoine-François Ève, and music by a collaborative of twelve composers. It was first performed in 1794.
- The Empress is parodied in Offenbach's operetta La Grande-Duchesse de Gérolstein (1867).
- Catherine appears in The Captain's Daughter, an opera in four acts (eight tableaux) by César Cui, composed during 1907–1909. The libretto was adapted by the composer from Alexander Pushkin's 1836 novel of the same name.
- Catherine is the subject of Great Catherine: Whom Glory Still Adores, a 1913 one-act play by Irish dramatist George Bernard Shaw.
- Mae West published the play Catherine Was Great in 1944, starring in it then and in subsequent productions.
- Catherine appears in Être Dieu: opéra-poème, audiovisuel et cathare en six parties (French for "Being God: a Cathar Audiovisual Opera-Poem in Six Parts"), an "opera-poem" written by Spanish surrealist painter Salvador Dalí, based on a libretto by Manuel Vázquez Montalbán, with music by French avant-garde musician Igor Wakhévitch. It was originally published in 1985.
- Catherine is one of the main characters in the ballet Russian Hamlet (1999) by Boris Eifman
- The Yugoslav new-wave band EKV (Ekaterina Velika) was named after Catherine.
- The song "Catherine the Great" from the album Foreverland by The Divine Comedy was released as a single on 24 June 2016.

=== Other ===
- Catherine (portrayed by Meghan Tonjes) is featured in the web series Epic Rap Battles of History, in the episode "Alexander the Great vs. Ivan the Terrible" (12 July 2016), pitted against the titular characters, as well as Frederick the Great and Pompey the Great.
- She appears as a leader of the Russian civilization in Civilization games II, III, Revolution, IV, V, and VII.

== See also ==
- Catherine II and opera
- Family tree of Russian monarchs
- Potemkin village

== Explanatory notes ==
Catherine the Great House of Anhalt Born: 2 May 1729 Died: 17 November 1796
Regnal titles
Preceded by Peter III	Empress of Russia; 9 July 1762 – 17 November 1796	Succeeded by Paul I
Russian royalty
Vacant Title last held by Yekaterina Alexeievna (Martha Skowrońska)	Empress consort of Russia; 5 January 1762 – 9 July 1762	Vacant Title next held by Maria Feodorovna (Sophie Dorothea of Württemberg)
