= Lomonosovo =

Lomonosovo (Russian: Ломоносово) is the name of several rural localities in Russia:

- Lomonosovo, Arkhangelsk Oblast, a selo in Lomonosovsky Selsoviet of Kholmogorsky District of Arkhangelsk Oblast
- Lomonosovo, Republic of Bashkortostan, a village in Novotroitsky Selsoviet of Chishminsky District of the Republic of Bashkortostan
