= Lysitsa =

Lysitsa Лысица
- Village
- Location within Arkhangelsk Oblast Location within Russia
- Coordinates: 63°35′N 41°45′E
- Country: Russia
- Region: Arkhangelsk Oblast
- District: Kholmogorsky District

Population
  - Total: 25
- Time zone: UTC+3:00

Lysitsa (Russian: Лысица) is a rural locality (a village) in Yemetskoye Rural Settlement of Kholmogorsky District, Arkhangelsk Oblast, Russia. The population was 25 as of 2010.

== Geography ==
It is located on the Severnaya Dvina River, 117 km south of Kholmogory (the district's administrative centre) by road. Volost is the nearest rural locality.
