= Vaymuzhsky =

Vaymuzhsky Ваймужский
- Settlement
- Location within Arkhangelsk Oblast Location within Russia
- Coordinates: 63°34′N 41°13′E
- Country: Russia
- Region: Arkhangelsk Oblast
- District: Kholmogorsky District

Population (2010)
  - Total: 67
- Time zone: UTC+3:00

Vaymuzhsky (Russian: Ваймужский) is a rural locality (a settlement) in Yemetskoye Rural Settlement of Kholmogorsky District, Arkhangelsk Oblast, Russia. The population was 67 as of 2010.

== Geography ==
Vaymuzhsky is located on the Vaymuga River, 143 km southwest of Kholmogory (the district's administrative centre) by road. Oseryodok is the nearest rural locality.
