= Zachachye =

Zachachye Зачачье
- Village
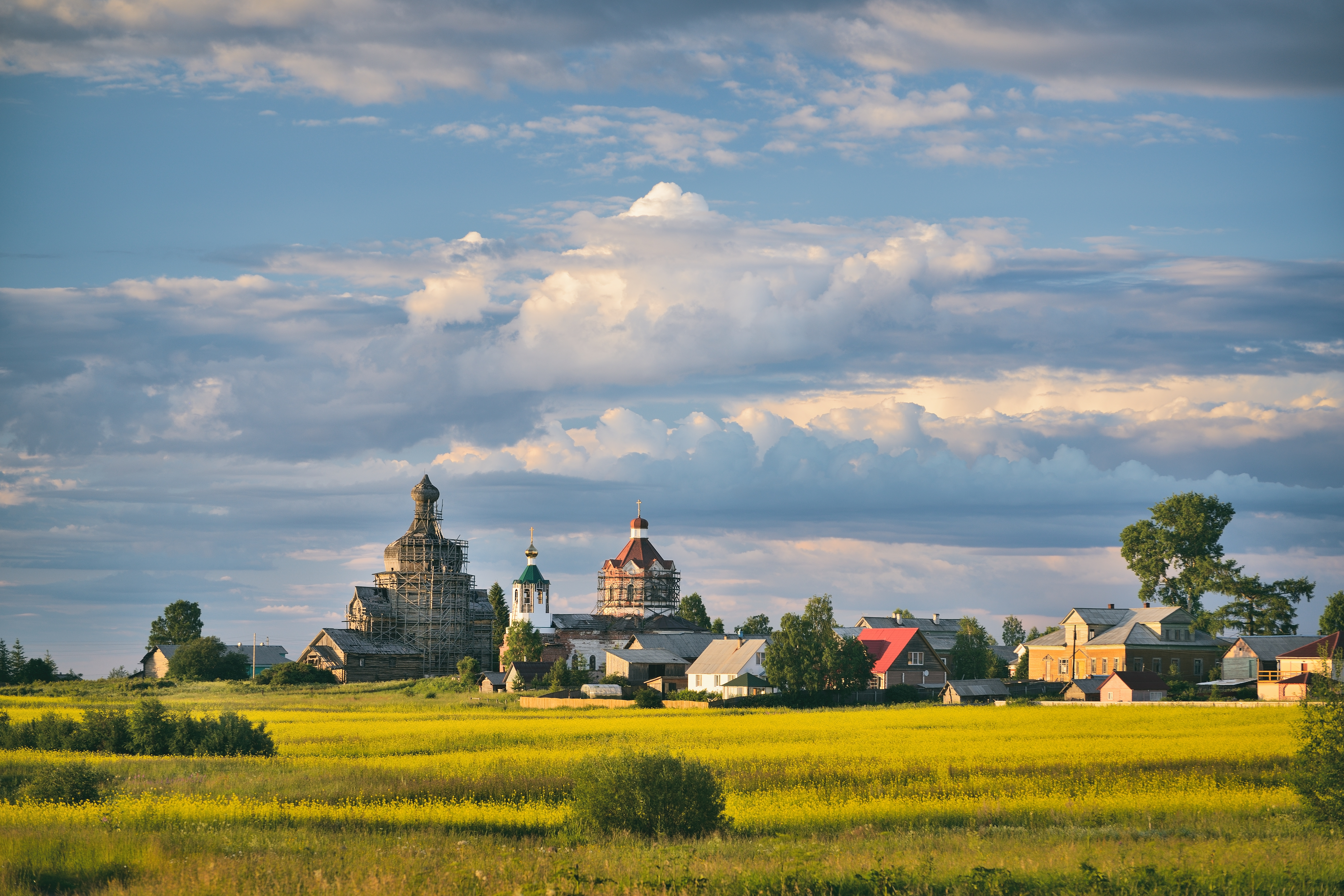

- Location within Arkhangelsk Oblast Location within Russia
- Coordinates: 63°25′N 41°48′E
- Country: Russia
- Region: Arkhangelsk Oblast
- District: Kholmogorsky District

Population (2010)
  - Total: 108
- Time zone: UTC+3:00

Zachachye (Russian: Зачачье) is a rural locality (a village) in Zachachyevskoye Rural Settlement of Kholmogorsky District, Arkhangelsk Oblast, Russia. The population was 108 as of 2010.

== Geography ==
Zachachye is located on the Bolshaya Chacha River, 112 km southeast of Kholmogory (the district's administrative centre) by road. Podlesye is the nearest rural locality.
