= Rembuyevo =

Rembuyevo Рембуево
- Village
- Location within Arkhangelsk Oblast Location within Russia
- Coordinates: 64°19′N 41°35′E
- Country: Russia
- Region: Arkhangelsk Oblast
- District: Kholmogorsky District
- Time zone: UTC+3:00

Rembuyevo (Russian: Рембуево) is a rural locality (a village) in Ukhtostrovskoye Rural Settlement of Kholmogorsky District, Arkhangelsk Oblast, Russia. The population was 331 as of 2010.

== Geography ==
Rembuyevo is located on the Severnaya Dvina River, 44 km north of Kholmogory (the district's administrative centre) by road. Volkovo is the nearest rural locality.
