= Ichkovo =

Ichkovo Ичково
- Village
- Location within Arkhangelsk Oblast Location within Russia
- Coordinates: 63°56′N 41°44′E
- Country: Russia
- Region: Arkhangelsk Oblast
- District: Kholmogorsky District

Population
  - Total: 197
- Time zone: UTC+3:00

Ichkovo (Russian: Ичково) is a rural locality (a village) in Matigorskoye Rural Settlement of Kholmogorsky District, Arkhangelsk Oblast, Russia. The population was 197 as of 2010.

== Geography ==
Ichkovo is located on the Severnaya Dvina River, 42 km south of Kholmogory (the district's administrative centre) by road. Pyakovo is the nearest rural locality.
