= Siysky Zakaznik =

Nature preserve in Arkhangelsk Oblast, Russia

- IUCN category III (natural monument or feature)
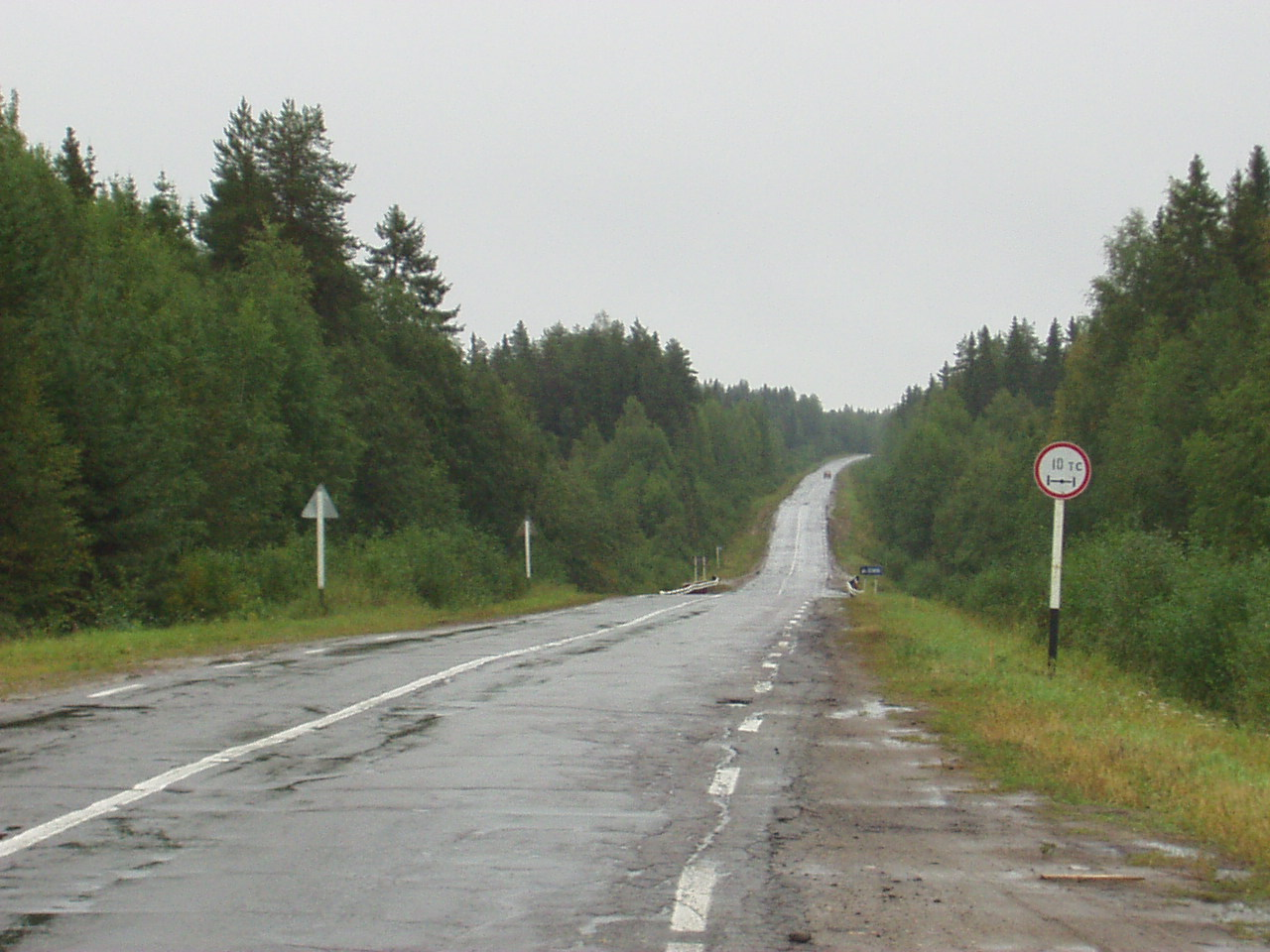
- A road in the Siysky Zakaznik

- Location within Russia
- Location: Russia
- Nearest city: Arkhangelsk
- Coordinates: 61°33′N 41°33′E
- Area: 430 km^{2} (170 sq mi)
- Established: 1988
- Governing body: Department of hunting of the administration of Arkhangelsk Oblast

Siysky Zakaznik (Russian: Сийский заказник) is a federal zakaznik, a nature protected area, in the north of Russia, located in Kholmogorsky District of Arkhangelsk Oblast, north-west of the selo of Yemetsk. It was established in 1963 and transferred to the federal jurisdiction (thereby becoming a federal zakaznik) December 30, 1988. The zakaznik is created to protect flora and fauna (in particular, rare species) of the pine-tree forest environment.

== Location and geography ==
Siysky Zakaznik is located in the southern part of Kholmogorsky District, on the left bank of the Northern Dvina River. The northern part of the park is adjacent to the Northern Dvina, whereas the southern part is limited by the Yemtsa River, one of the biggest tributaries of the Northern Dvina. The northern part contains a number of lakes as well, the biggest of them being Lake Ploskoye and Lake Punanets. On the south, the zakaznik is crossed by the Vaymuga River, a tributary of the Yemtsa. The whole area of the zakaznik is crossed from north to south by the M8, which connects Moscow and Arkhangelsk. There are a number of villages in the limits of the zakaznik, as well as the Antonievo-Siysky Monastery.

The zakaznik is located on the plain. There are karst formations present, including karst lakes. In total, there are 52 lakes and 16 swamps in the zakaznik.

== Flora ==
The area of the zakaznik is covered by woods, of which 80% is coniferous forest (mostly pines and firs).

== Fauna ==
Mammals present in Siysky Zakaznik include moose, wild boar, brown bear, lynx, wolverine, badger, beaver, European mink, European otter and others.
