= Yemetsk =

Yemetsk Емецк
- Selo
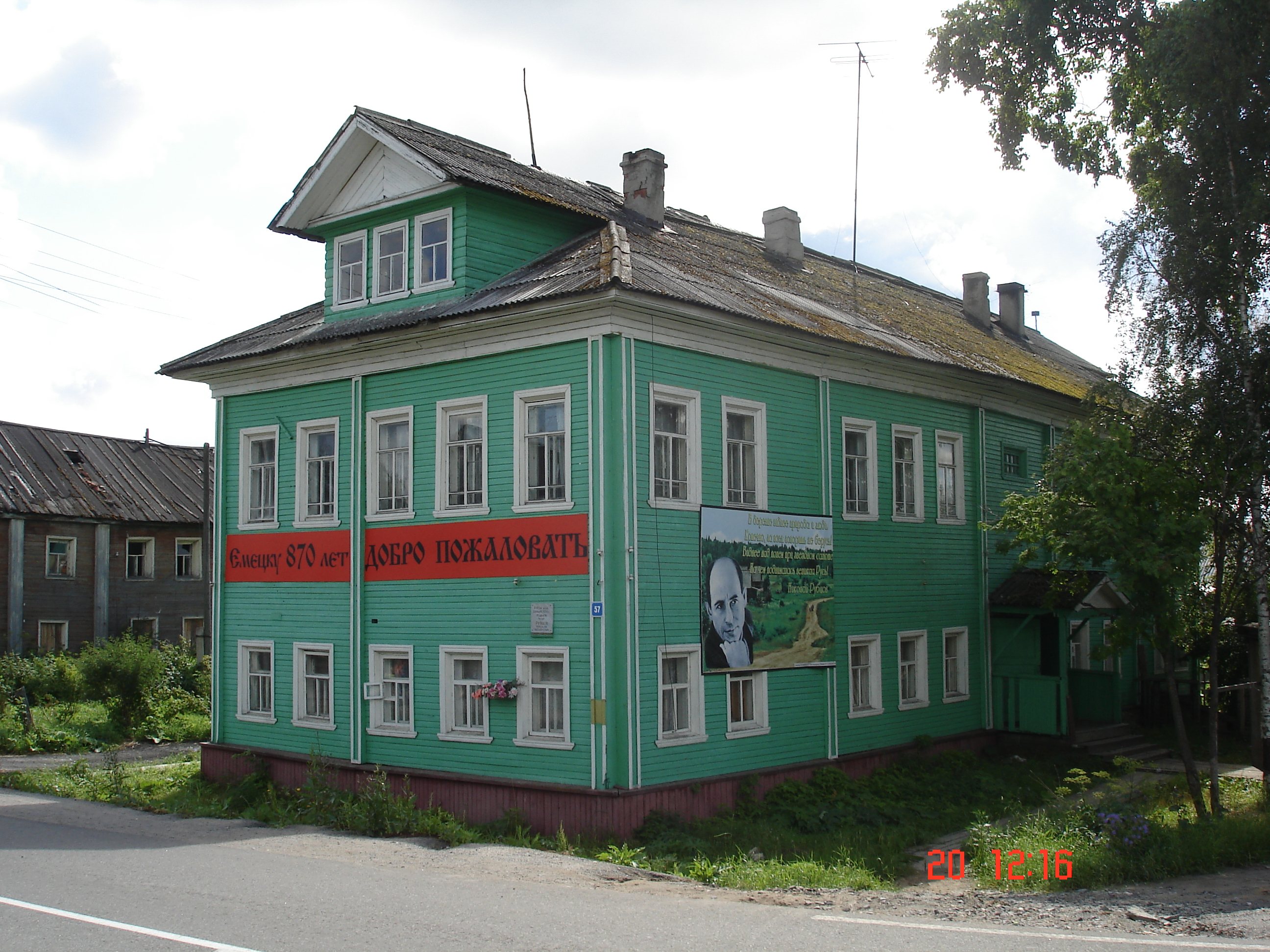
- Nikolay Rubtsov's birth house
- Interactive map of Yemetsk
- Location of Yemetsk Yemetsk (Russia)
- Coordinates: 63°28′N 41°46′E
- Country: Russia
- Federal subject: Arkhangelsk Oblast
- Administrative district: Kholmogorsky District
- First mentioned: 1137

Population (2010 Census)
  - Total: 1,077
  - Estimate (2012): 1,380 (+28.1%)
- Time zone: UTC+3 (MSK)
- Postal code: 164537
- Dialing code: +7 81830
- OKTMO ID: 11656408101

Yemetsk (Russian: Емецк) is a rural locality (a selo) and the administrative center of Yemetskoye Rural Settlement of Kholmogorsky District, Arkhangelsk Oblast, Russia. The population was 1,077 as of 2010. There are 10 streets.

== Geography ==
Yemetsk is located on the Yemtsy River, 104 km south of Kholmogory (the district's administrative centre) by road. Shiltsovo is the nearest rural locality.
