= Siya Monastery =

Russian Orthodox monastery

Coordinates: 63.5520861°N 41.5576361°E

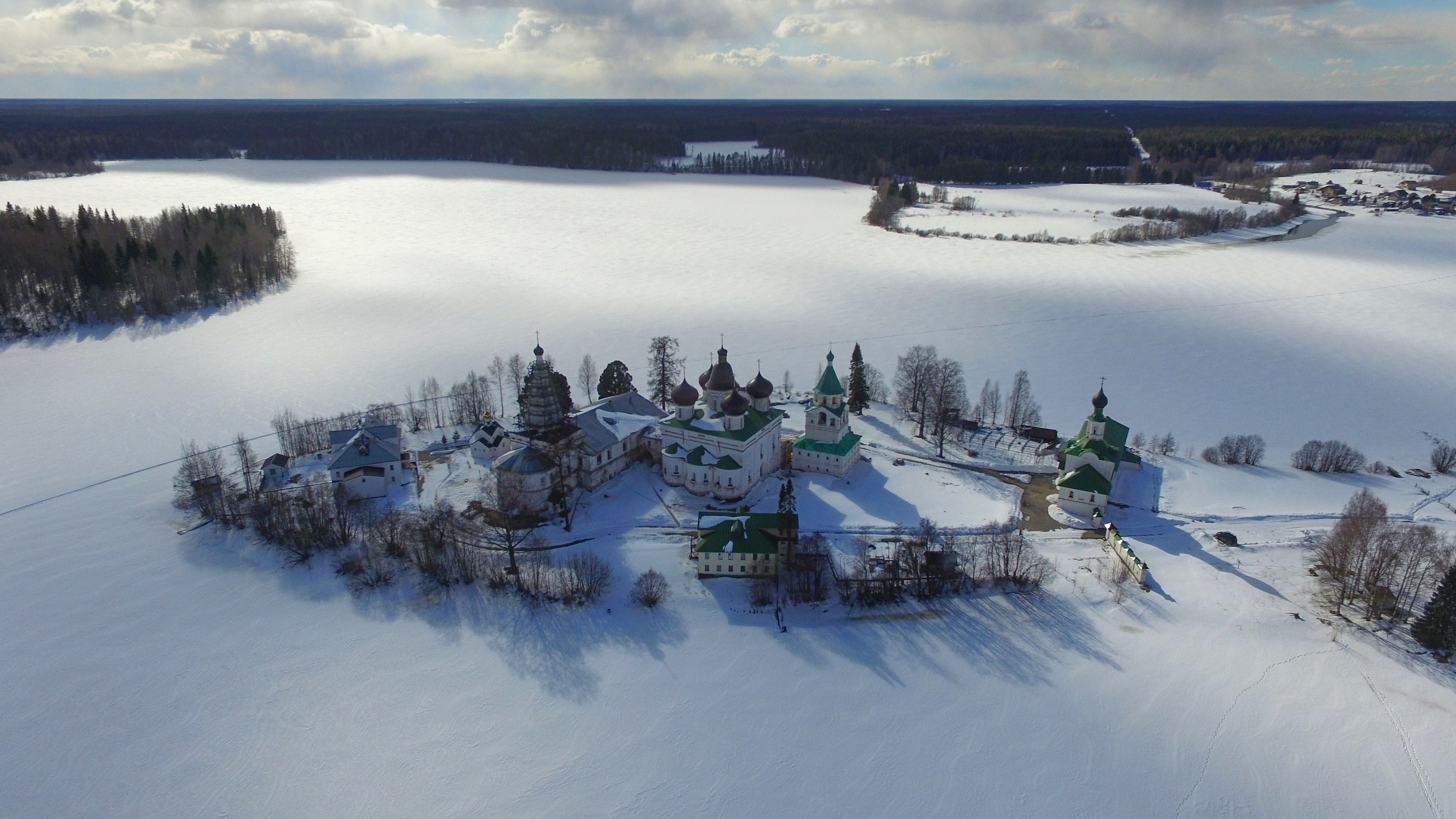
The monastery in 2017

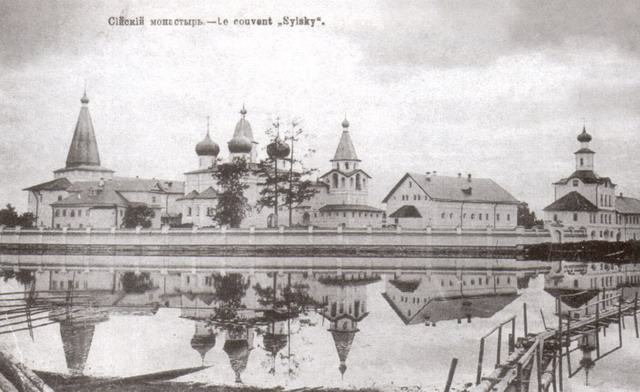
The pre-Petrine buildings at some point prior to 1917

The Siya Monastery of St. Antonius (Antonievo-Siysky Monastery, Russian: Антониево-Сийский монастырь) is a Russian Orthodox monastery that was founded by Saint Antonius of Siya deep in the woods, 90 km (56 mi) to the south of Kholmogory, in 1520. Currently the monastery is located in Kholmogorsky District of Arkhangelsk Oblast in Russia, inside the Siya Zakaznik nature protected area.

The monastery takes its name from the Siya River, a tributary of the Northern Dvina. This river route allowed the monks to travel to the Solovetsky Monastery and other centres of spiritual life. There was also a station on the trade route connecting Archangel (the main sea port of Muscovy) and the Russian capital of Moscow.

Following the saint's death in 1556, the monastery grew on the salt trade with Western Europe and developed into one of the foremost centres of Christianity in the Russian North. Ivan the Terrible and his son Feodor granted it important privileges and much land. By 1579, the monastery owned 50 versts of ploughlands stretching towards Kargopol.

In 1599, Boris Godunov exiled his political opponent Feodor Romanov to this remote monastery. While many of his relatives were starved to death in other cloisters, Feodor took monastic vows and the name Philaret and was eventually raised to the dignity of hegumen (abbot) of the monastery. Later he became the Patriarch of Moscow, and his son Mikhail established the Romanov dynasty of Russian tsars.

In the 17th century, the monastery continued to prosper. The large katholikon was constructed between 1587 and 1608. The tent-like church and refectory were completed by 1644, and the belfry was added in 1652. The monastic library was one of the richest in Russia and included such books as the Siysky Gospel from 1339 and the 16th-century album of 500 Western religious etchings adapted to Eastern Orthodox canonical requirements. Its treasury was famed for its collection of medieval jewelry. In 1764, the monastery owned more than 3,300 male peasants.

In 1923, the monastery was disbanded. Both library and treasury were taken to Moscow or Arkhangelsk. The medieval buildings were used as a sanatorium and a kolkhoz. The monks were readmitted to the grounds in 1992 and immediately began emergency repairs.
