= Fedot Shubin =

Russian sculptor

- Федот Иванович Шубин
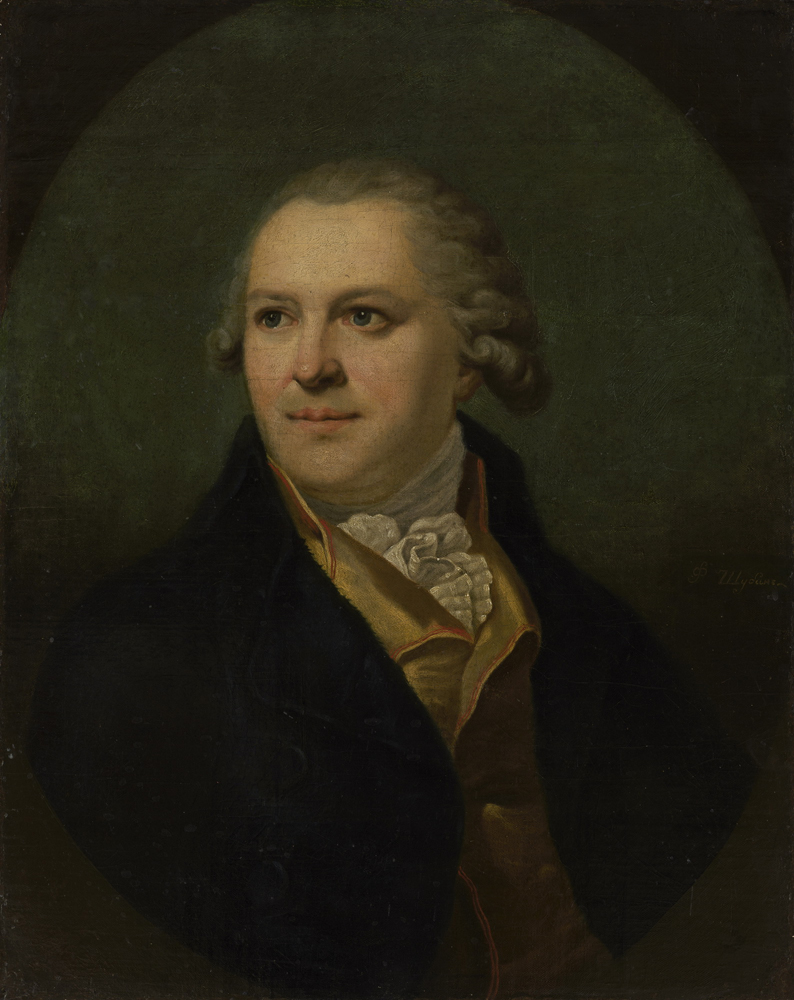
- Self-Portrait, c. 1794, oil on canvas, 69 by 54.5 cm, Russian Museum, Saint Petersburg
- Born: Fedot Shubnoy; May 17, 1740; Archangelgorod Governorate
- Died: May 12, 1805 (aged 64); Saint Petersburg
- Education: Member Academy of Arts (1774)
- Alma mater: Imperial Academy of Arts (1766)
- Known for: Sculpture
- Awards: Big Gold Medal of the Imperial Academy of Arts (1766)

Fedot Ivanovich Shubin (May 28, 1740 – May 24, 1805) is widely regarded as the greatest sculptor of 18th-century Russia.

== Biography ==
A peasant's son, Fedot Shubnoy was born in a Pomor village near Kholmogory and, inspired by the example of his neighbour Mikhail Lomonosov, he walked all the way to St Petersburg at the age of 18. Lomonosov took notice of his talent in walrus ivory carving (a folkcraft traditionally practised in Kholmogory) and helped him join the newly established Imperial Academy of Arts, where his instructor, Nicolas-François Gillet, was so impressed with his abilities that he had Shubin awarded with a gold medal, which opened to him the prospect of furthering his education abroad.

Through the help of Falconet, in 1767 he joined the Paris atelier of the great Pigalle, before moving to Rome three years later. Upon his return to Russia in 1772, Shubin became the most fashionable and sought-after sculptor in the country. In the 1770s and 1780s, he executed numerous pieces for the Marble Palace and the Alexandro-Nevsky Lavra, designed 58 medallions representing all the Russian sovereigns from Rurik onward, and was admitted into the Academy of Arts as an academician. The intrigues of his rivals undermined his career, however. He remained destitute until 1794, when the academy eventually bestowed a professorship on him.

A plaster copy of an early Shubin bust of Tsar Alexander I is housed at Thomas Jefferson's house Monticello in Albemarle County, Virginia. The original Shubin work was a gift from the American consul general at St. Petersburg, Levett Harris, in 1804. Shubin's original work given by Harris to Jefferson was lost. Shubin's portrait of Tsar Alexander is in the collection of the Voronezh Museum of Plastic Arts in Voronezh, Russia. The plaster copy, executed in 1955, is housed in the parlor at Monticello.

== Works ==
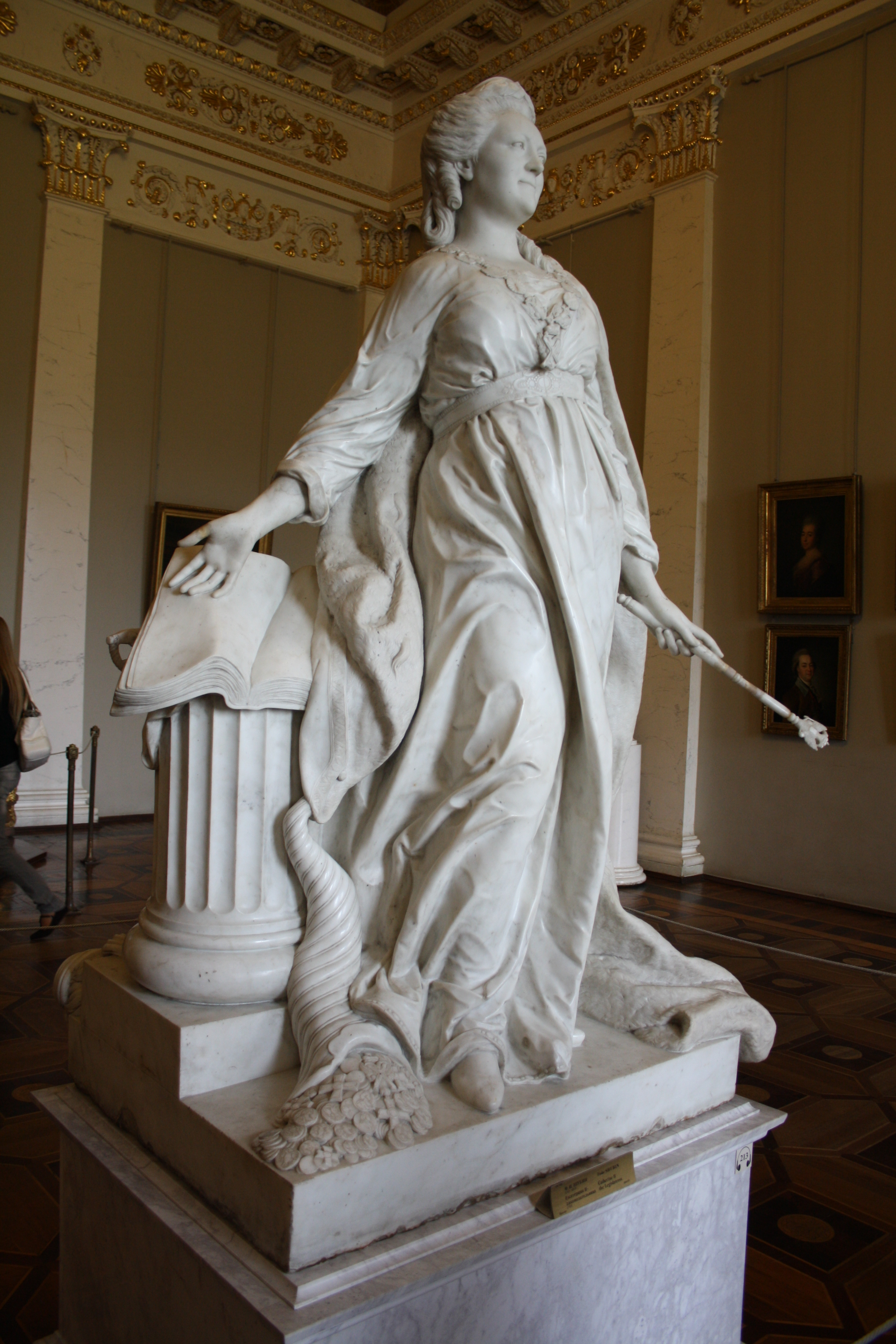
Marble statue of Catherine II (1789-1790)

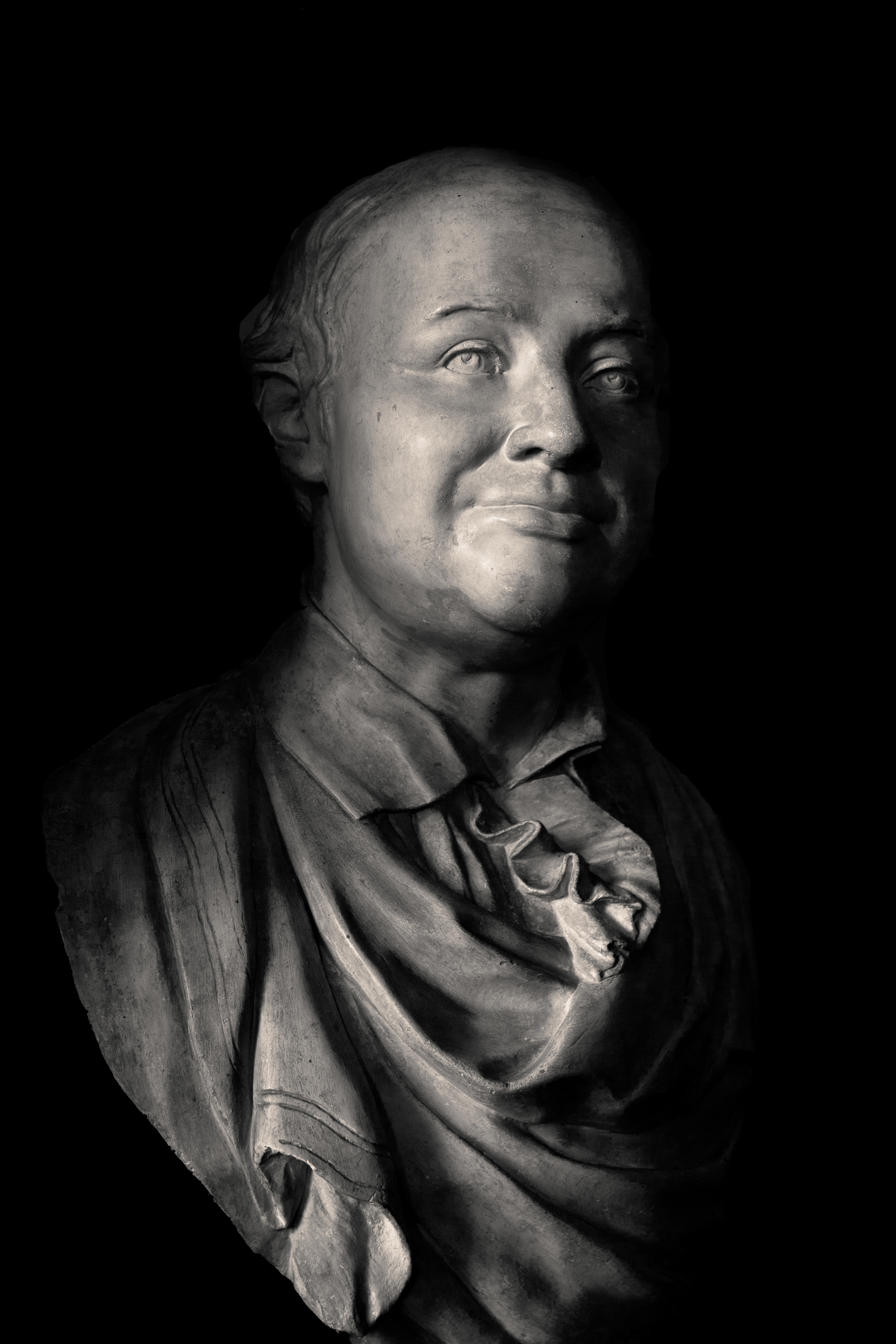
Portrait of M. Lomonosov, plaster, before 1793, Russian Museum. Saint-Petersburg

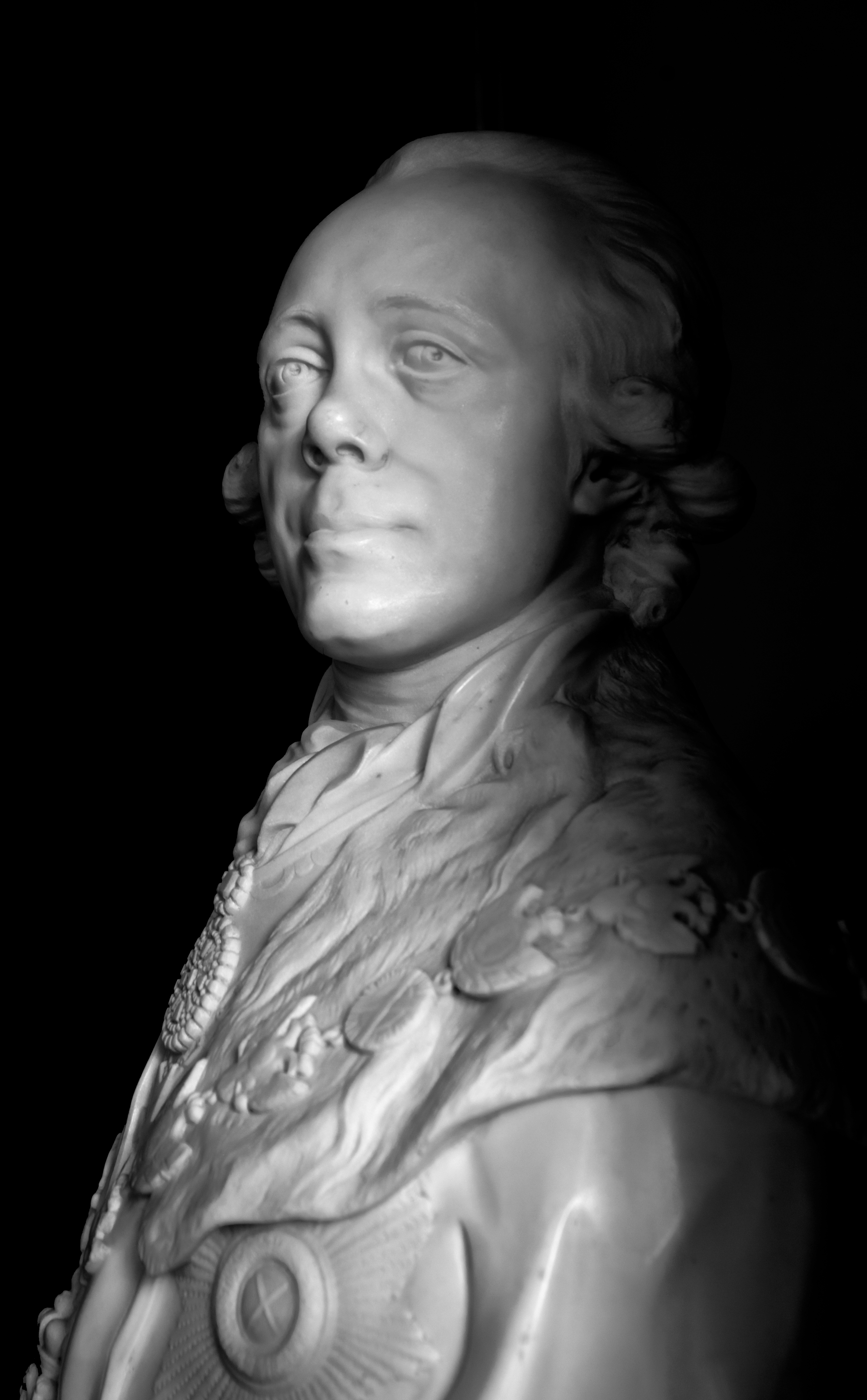
Portrait of Paul I, marble, 1800, Russian Museum. Saint-Petersburg

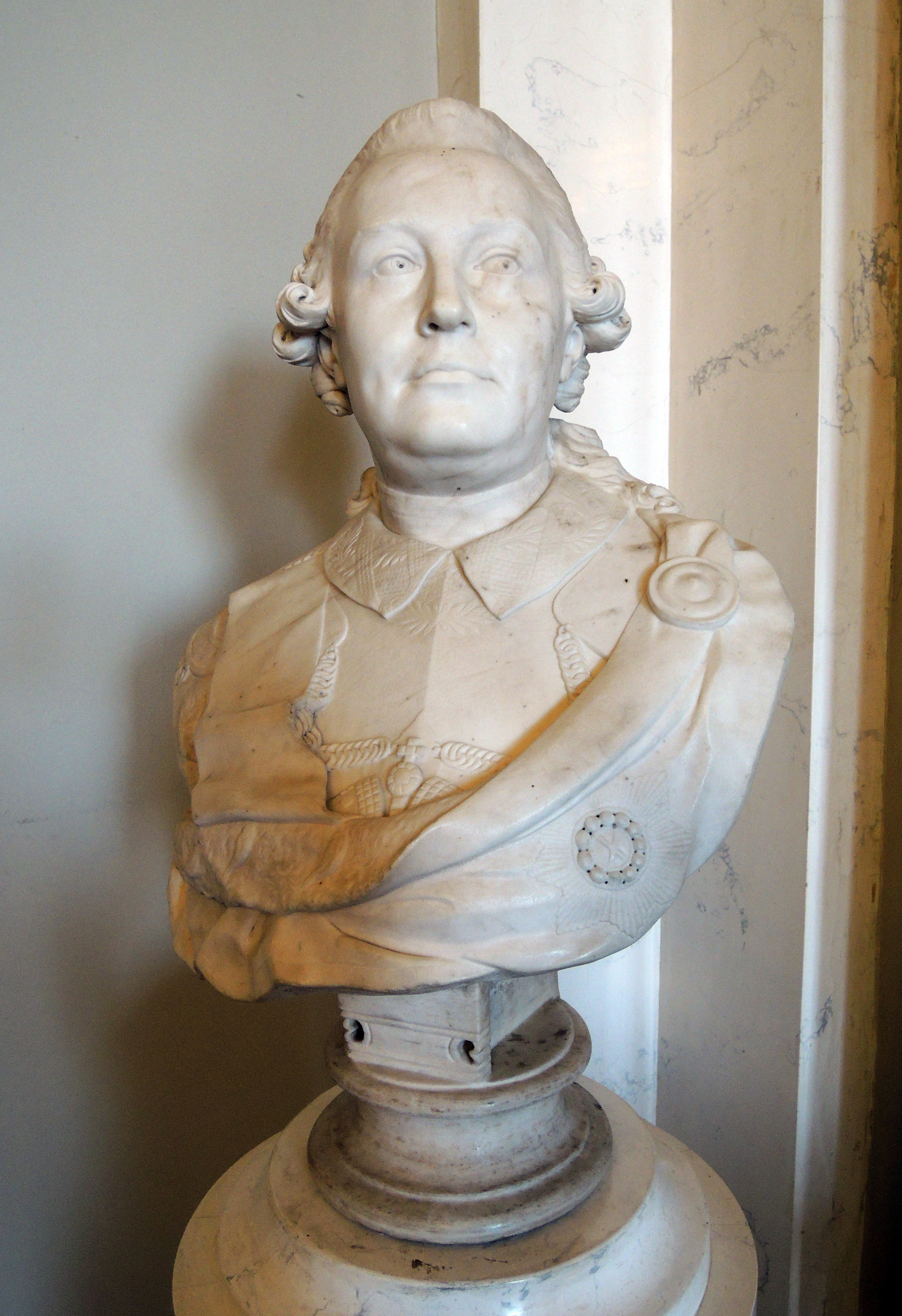
Count Grigory Orlov (1773)

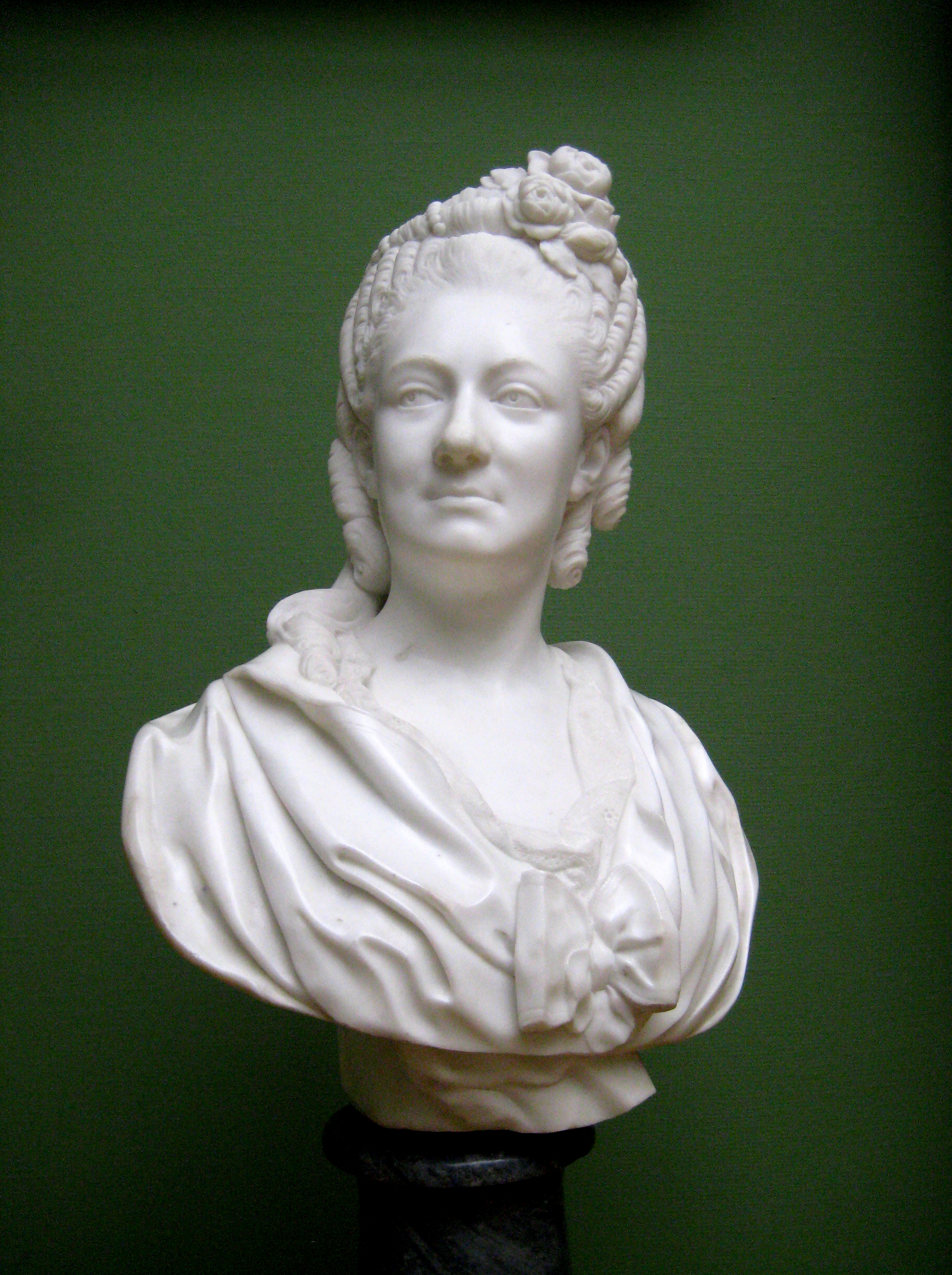
Countess Maria Panina (1775)

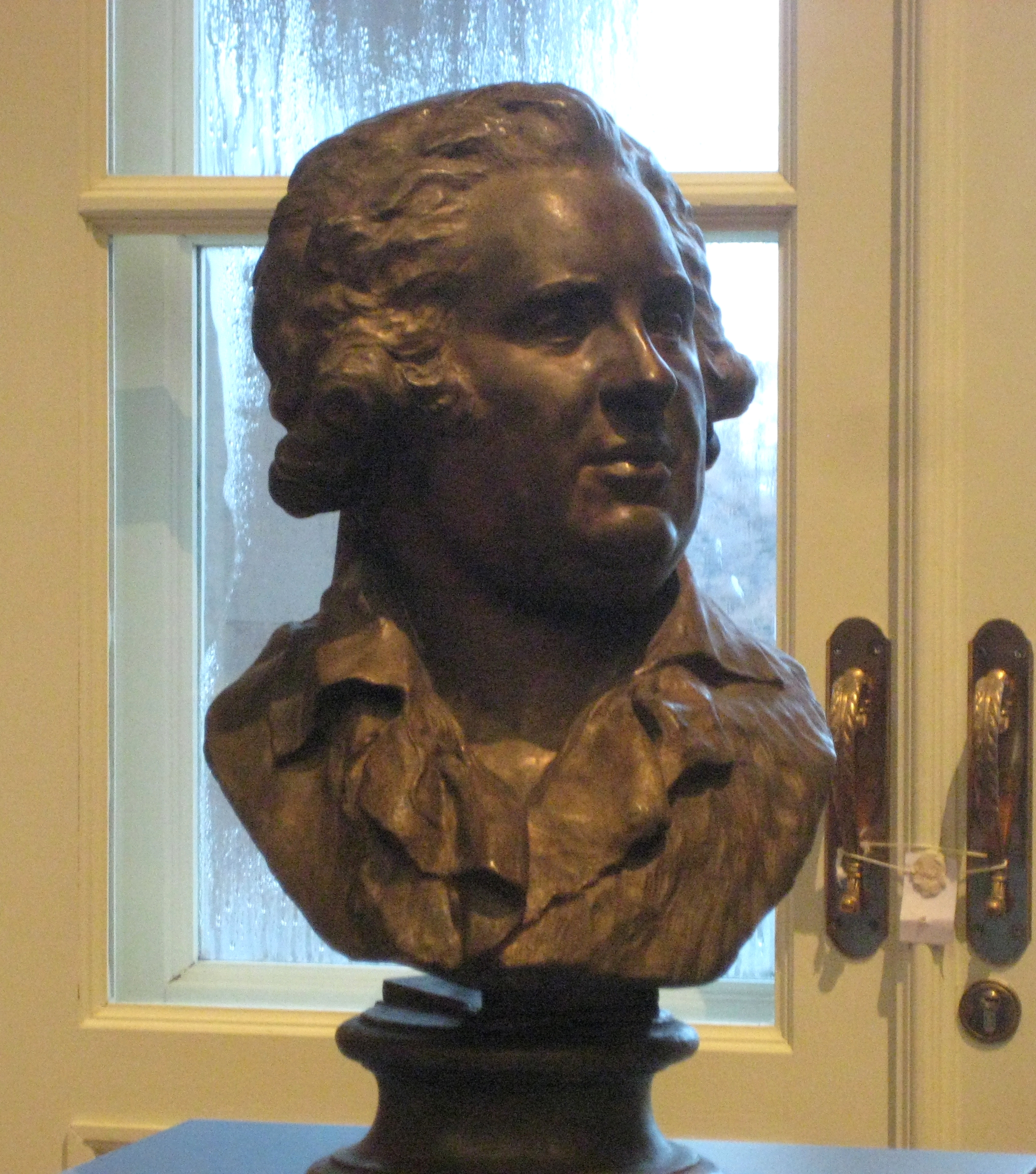
Count Alexander Bezborodko

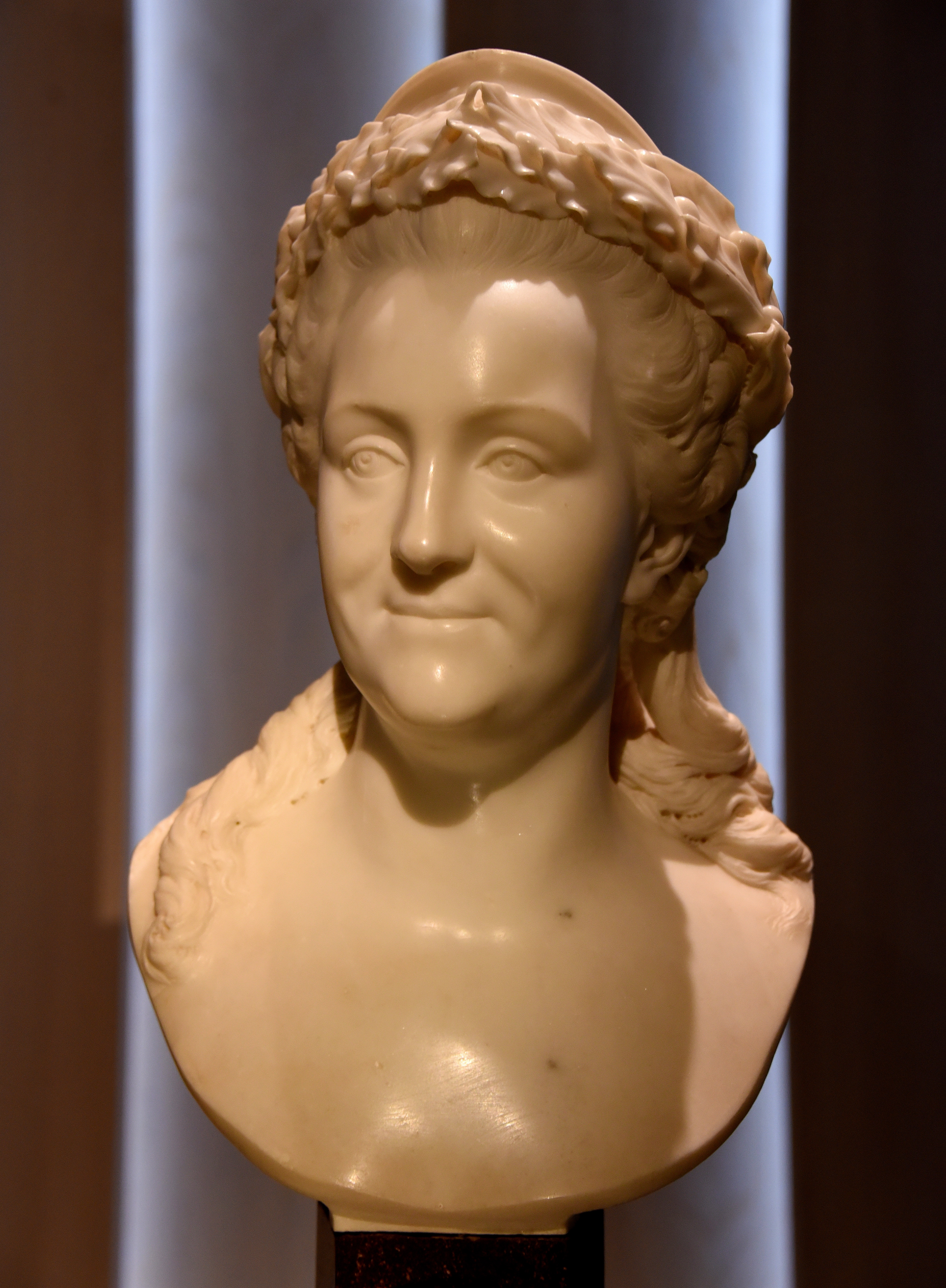
Marble bust of Catherine the Great (1771)
