= Kholmogory bone carving =

Russian traditional handcraft

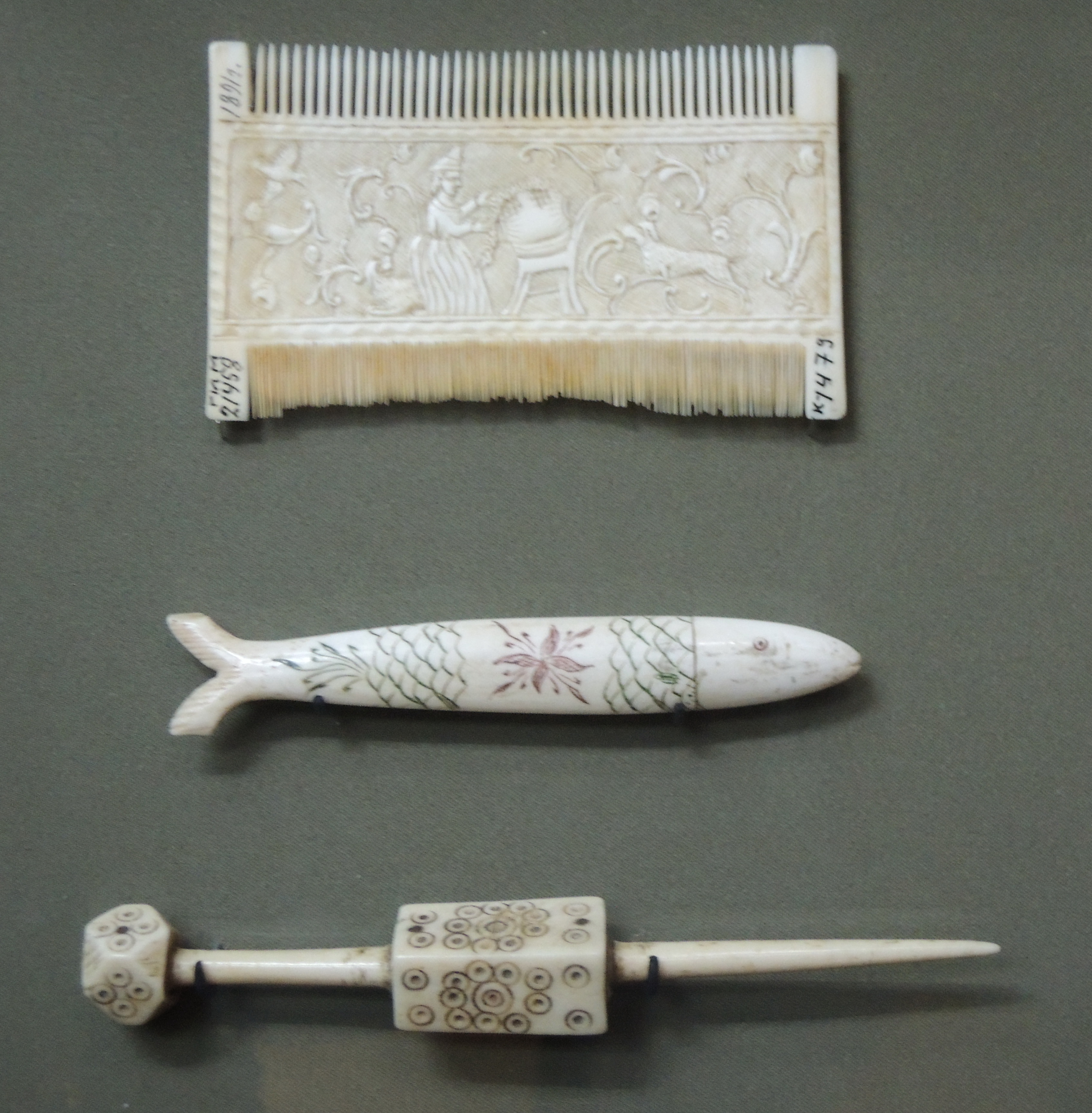
Items for fancy-work

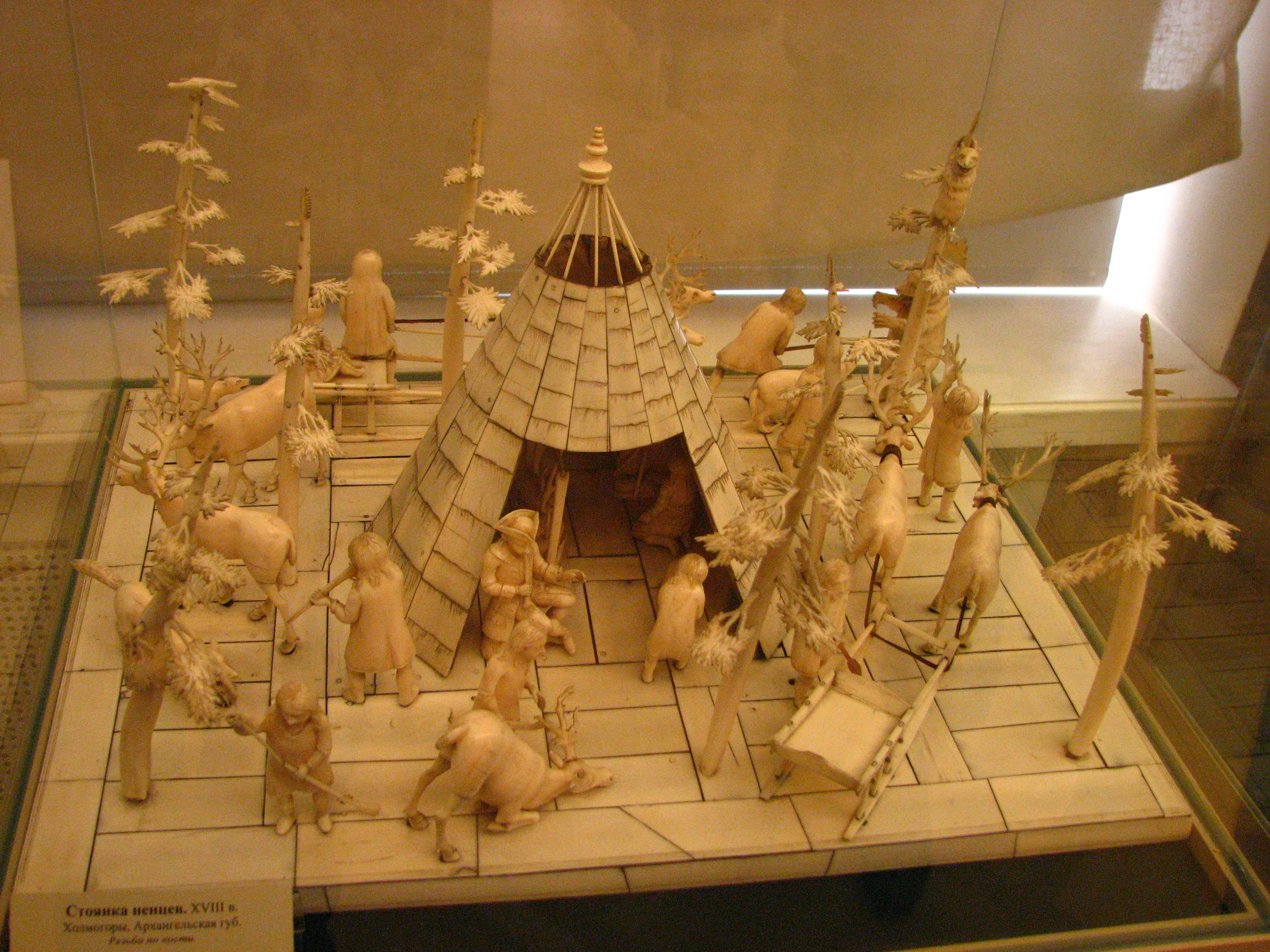
A walrus ivory model of the Nenets encampment (18th century)

Kholmogory bone carving (Russian: Холмогорская резная кость) is a traditional handicraft practiced in the villages of Kholmogorsky District, Arkhangelsk Oblast, in the north of Russia.

The craft of bone carving was developed in the town of Kholmogory in the 17th century. It has been first mentioned in connection with the fact that two Kholmogory carvers, brothers Yevdokim and Semyon Sheshenin, were invited to work in the Kremlin Armoury, which performed orders for the tsar’s court. The handicraft reached its peak in the 18th century under the reign of Peter the Great. Artisans were using walrus ivory, seal bones, and in rare cases even elephant and mammoth ivory. In the 18th century, carved boxes, bracelets, portrait frames and similar objects were very popular.

The famous 18th-century Russian sculptor, Fedot Shubin, started his career at Kholmogory as a walrus ivory carver. In the second half of the 18th century, the most notable carvers in Kholmogory were Osip Dudin and Nikolay Vereshchagin.

In the second half of the 19th century, the handicraft declined, and by the 1880s only several carvers were left. The local authorities made an attempt to save the handicraft, and in 1885 in the village of Lomonosovo, close to Kholmogory, a master class in bone carving opened. The class had to be closed in 1900 due to the lack of interest. The next attempt to revive the handicraft was made in 1934, when the Central Executive Committee of USSR adopted a special decree on measures to develop Kholmogory bone carving. In 1937, the carving objects got acclaim at the 1937 World Fair in Paris. Whereas in 1930s and 1950s the main purpose of the handicraft was to serve the Soviet propaganda, and the objects were therefore carved in the Stalin Empire style, from 1960s on the carvers rediscovered the techniques and motives of the 18th century carvers, and the modern Kholmogory bone carving became more individual.

Currently the carving is being performed at the Lomonosov Bone Carving Factory.
