= Lomonosovo, Republic of Bashkortostan =

Lomonosovo Ломоносово
- Village
- Location within Bashkortostan Location within Russia
- Coordinates: 54°26′N 55°39′E
- Country: Russia
- Region: Bashkortostan
- District: Chishminsky District
- Time zone: UTC+5:00

Lomonosovo (Russian: Ломоносово) is a rural locality (a village) in Chishminsky District, Bashkortostan, Russia. The population was 7 as of 2010. There is 1 street.

== Geography ==
Lomonosovo is located 34 km southeast of Chishmy, the district's administrative seat. Bilyazy is the nearest rural locality.
