= Nikolay Rubtsov =

Russian poet

- Николай Михайлович Рубцов
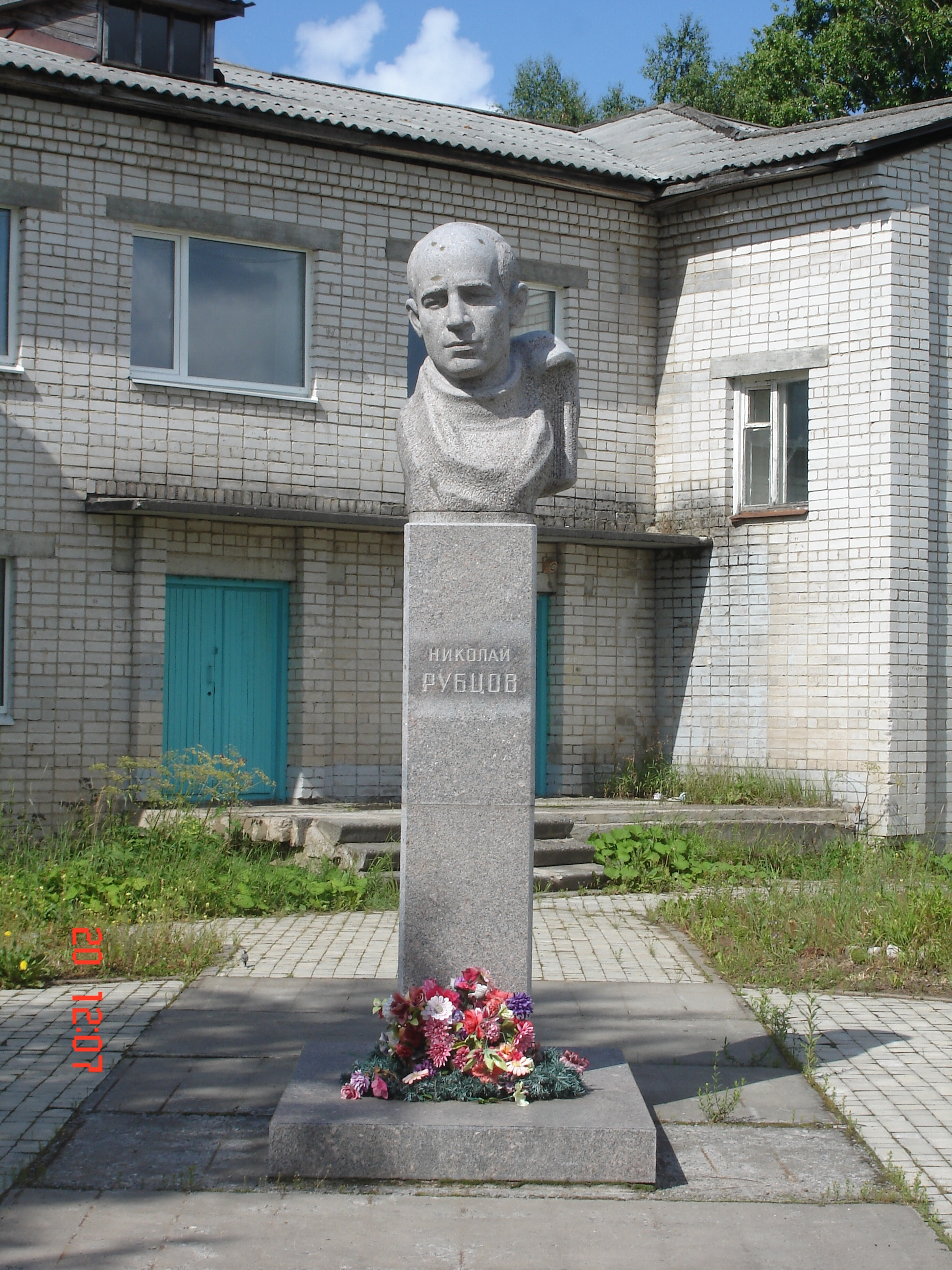
- Born: 3 January 1936; Yemetsk, RSFSR, Soviet Union
- Died: 19 January 1971 (aged 35); Vologda
- Citizenship: Soviet
- Education: Totma Forestry College
- Occupation: Poet

Nikolay Mikhaylovich Rubtsov (Russian: Николай Михайлович Рубцов; 3 January 1936, Yemetsk, Northern Krai – 19 January 1971, Vologda) was a Russian poet.

== Biography ==
Nikolay Rubtsov was born on January 3, 1936, in the village of Yemetsk, Yemetsky district of the Northern Territory (now Kholmogory district of the Arkhangelsk region).

In 1937 he moved with his large family to Nyandoma.

In 1939–1940, Rubtsov's father Mikhail Andrianovich worked as the head of the Nyandoma Gorpo.

In January 1941, Mikhail Rubtsov left Nyandoma for the Vologda City Party Committee. In Vologda, the Rubtsovs were caught up in the Great Patriotic War.

In the summer of 1942, Rubtsov's mother and younger sister died, their father was at the front, and the children were sent to boarding schools. That same summer, 6-year-old Nikolay wrote his first poem.

Nikolay and his brother first ended up in the Krasovsky orphanage, and from October 1943 until June 1950, Nikolay lived and studied in an orphanage in the village of Nikolskoye, Totemsky District, Vologda Oblast, where he graduated from seven classes of school (now the House is located in this building). Museum of N. M. Rubtsov). In the same village, his daughter Yelena was subsequently born in a de facto marriage with Henrietta Mikhailovna Menshikova.

In his autobiography, written upon entering the trawl fleet in 1952, Nikolay wrote that his father went to the front and died in 1941. But in fact, Mikhail Andrianovich Rubtsov (1899–1962) survived; after being wounded in 1944, he returned to Vologda and in the same year married again, lived in Vologda. Due to the loss of documents in the Krasovsky orphanage, he was unable to find Nikolay and met him only in 1955.

From 1950 to 1952, Rubtsov studied at the Totma Forestry College. From 1952 to 1953 he worked as a fireman in the Arkhangelsk trawl fleet of the Sevryba trust, from August 1953 to January 1955 he studied at the mine surveying department at the Mining and Chemical College of the Ministry of Chemical Industry in Kirovsk, Murmansk Oblast. In January 1955, he failed the winter session and was expelled from the technical school. Since March 1955, Rubtsov was a laborer at an experimental military training ground.

From October 1955 to October 1959, he served as a rangefinder on the Northern Fleet destroyer, Ostry.

Rubtsov was killed on the night of 19 January 1971, at the age of 35, in his apartment, the result of a domestic dispute with an aspiring poet Lyudmyla Derbina. The judicial investigation established that the death was violent, occurred as a result of suffocation – mechanical asphyxia from squeezing the neck with her hands.

Asteroid 4286 Rubtsov was named after him.
