= Lomonosovo, Arkhangelsk Oblast =

Lomonosovo Ломоносово
- Selo
- Location within Arkhangelsk Oblast Location within Russia
- Coordinates: 64°13′N 41°43′E
- Country: Russia
- Region: Arkhangelsk Oblast
- District: Kholmogorsky District

Population
  - Total: 163
- Time zone: UTC+3:00

Lomonosovo (Russian: Ломоносово) is a rural locality (a selo) in Kholmogorskoye Rural Settlement of Kholmogorsky District, Arkhangelsk Oblast, Russia. The population was 163 as of 2010.

The Russian scientist and writer Mikhail Lomonosov was born in the village (then known as Mishaninskaya and later renamed in his honor).

== Geography ==
Lomonosovo neighbors the rural locality of Kholmogory, located 3 km east.
