= Mikhail Lomonosov =

Russian polymath (1711–1765)

- Михаил Ломоносов
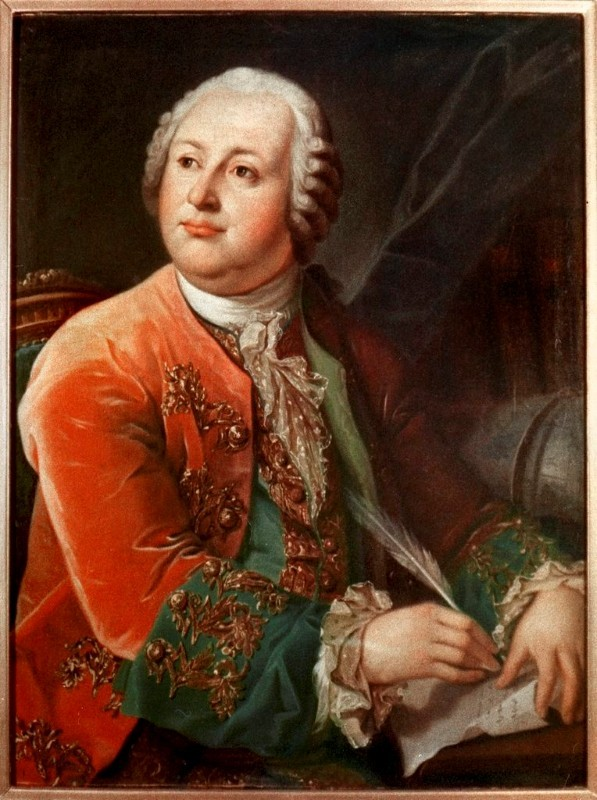
- Portrait by Georg Caspar Prenner, 1787
- Born: 19 November 1711; Mishaninskaya, Russia
- Died: 15 April 1765 (aged 53); Saint Petersburg, Russia
- Education: Slavic Greek Latin Academy; St. Petersburg Academy; University of Marburg
- Spouse: Elisabeth Christine Zilch
- Scientific career
- Fields: Natural science, Astronomy, chemistry, physics, physical chemistry, geology, geophysics, mineralogy, history, philology, optics
- Workplaces: St. Petersburg Academy
- Academic advisors: Christian Wolff

Mikhail Vasilyevich Lomonosov (Note: In this name that follows East Slavic naming customs, the patronymic is Vasilyevich and the family name is Lomonosov.) (Note: Russian: Михаил Васильевич Ломоносов, IPA: [mʲɪxɐˈil vɐˈsʲilʲjɪvʲɪtɕ ləmɐˈnosəf]) (/ˌlɒməˈnɒsɒf/; 19 November [O.S. 8 November] 1711 – 15 April [O.S. 4 April] 1765) was a Russian polymath, scientist and writer, who made important contributions to literature, education, and science. Among his discoveries were the atmosphere of Venus, the law of conservation of mass in chemical reactions, the theoretical prediction of Antarctica, and the idea of coaxial rotors. His spheres of science were natural science, chemistry, physics, mineralogy, history, art, philology, optical devices and others. One of the founders of modern geology, Lomonosov was also a poet and influenced the formation of the modern Russian literary language.

== Early life and family ==
Lomonosov was born in the village of Mishaninskaya, later renamed Lomonosovo in his honor, in Archangelgorod Governorate, on an island in Northern Dvina not far from Kholmogory, in the far north of Russia. His father, Vasily Dorofeyevich Lomonosov, was a prosperous peasant fisherman turned ship owner, who amassed a small fortune transporting goods from Arkhangelsk to Pustozyorsk, Solovki, Kola, and Lapland. Lomonosov's mother was Vasily's first wife, a deacon's daughter, Elena Ivanovna Sivkova.

He remained at Denisovka until he was ten, when his father decided that he was old enough to participate in his business ventures, and Lomonosov began accompanying Vasily on trading missions.

Lomonosov had been taught to read as a boy by his neighbor Ivan Shubny, and he spent every spare moment with his books. He continued his studies with the village deacon, S.N. Sabelnikov, but for many years the only books he had access to were religious texts. When he was fourteen, Lomonosov was given copies of Meletius Smotrytsky's Modern Church Slavonic (a grammar book) and Leonty Magnitsky's Arithmetic. Lomonosov was a Russian Orthodox Christian all his life, but had close encounters with Old Believers schism in early youth and later in life he became a deist.

In 1724, his father married for the third and final time. Lomonosov and his stepmother Irina had an acrimonious relationship. Unhappy at home and intent on obtaining a higher education, which Lomonosov could not receive in Mishaninskaya, he was determined to leave the village.

== Education ==
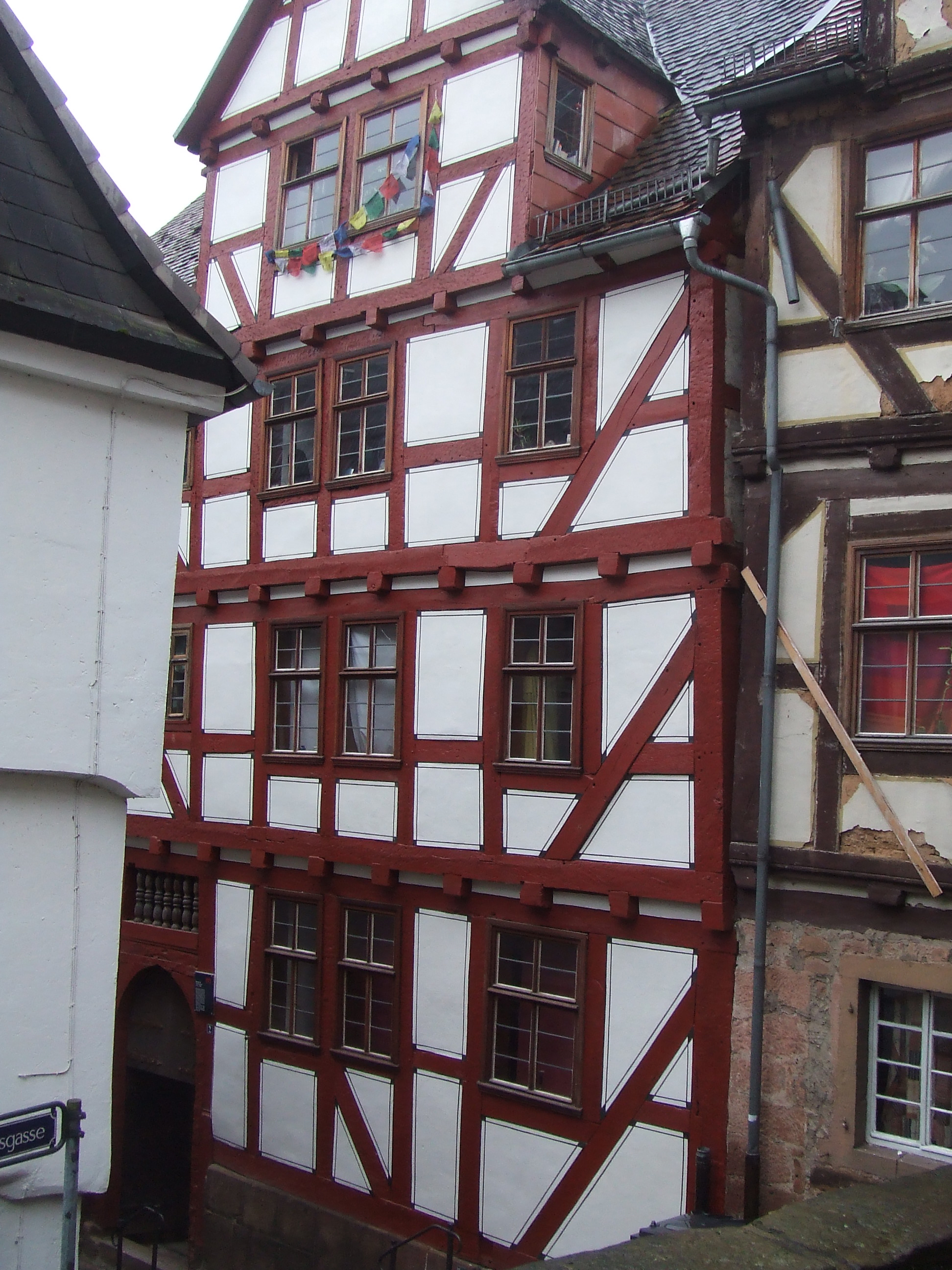
The Lomonosov house in Marburg, Germany

In 1730, determined to "study sciences," the 19-year-old Lomonosov walked all the way to Moscow. Shortly after arrival, he was admitted into the Slavic Greek Latin Academy by falsely claiming to be a son of a Kholmogory nobleman. In 1734 that initial falsehood, as well as another lie that he was the son of a priest, nearly got him expelled from the academy, but the investigation ended without severe consequences.

Lomonosov lived on three kopecks a day, eating only black bread and kvass, but he made rapid progress scholastically. It is believed that in 1735, after three years in Moscow he was sent to Kiev to study for short period at the Kiev Academy. He quickly became dissatisfied with the education he was receiving there, and returned to Moscow. In five years Lomonosov completed a twelve-year study course and in 1736, among 12 best graduates, was awarded a scholarship at the St. Petersburg Academy. He plunged into his studies and was rewarded with a four-year grant to study abroad, in Germany, first at the University of Marburg and then in Freiberg.

=== Education abroad ===
The University of Marburg was among Europe's most important universities in the mid-18th century due to the presence of the philosopher Christian Wolff, a prominent figure of the German Enlightenment. Lomonosov became one of Wolff's students while at Marburg from November 1736 to July 1739. Both philosophically and as a science administrator, this connection would be the most influential of Lomonosov's life. In 1739–1740 he studied mineralogy, mining, and metallurgy with Bergrat Henckel in his Freiberg laboratory; there, too, he intensified his studies of German literature.

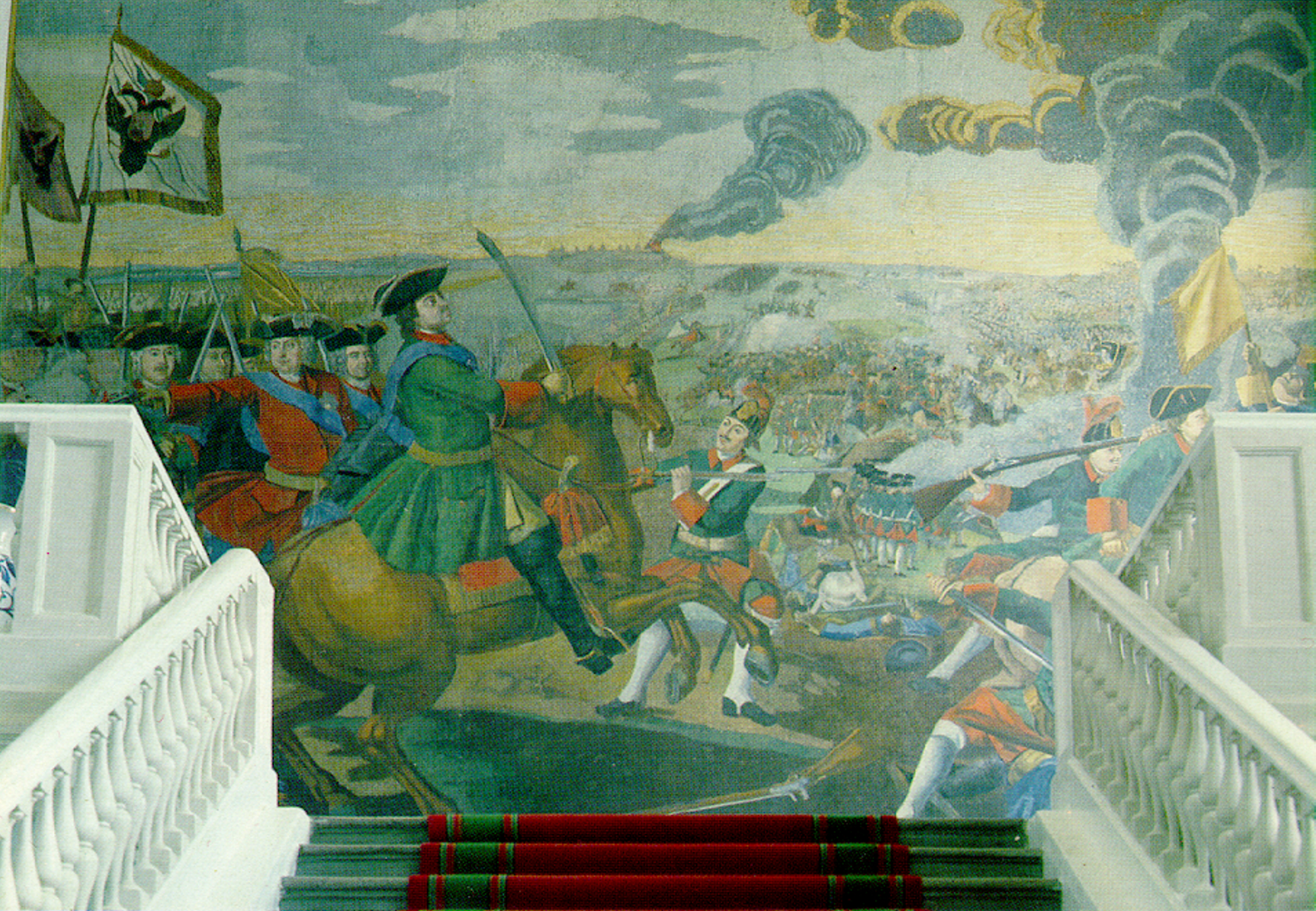
The most grandiose of Lomonosov's mosaics depicts the Battle of Poltava.

Lomonosov quickly mastered the German language, and in addition to philosophy, seriously studied chemistry, discovered the works of 17th century Irish theologian and natural philosopher Robert Boyle, and even began writing poetry. He also developed an interest in German literature. He is said to have especially admired Günther. His "Ode on the Taking of Khotin from the Turks," composed in 1739 – modelled after Günther's poem "Eugen ist fort. Ihr Musen, nach!", 1718, celebrating the taking of Belgrade from the Turks – attracted a great deal of attention in Saint Petersburg.

Contrary to his adoration for Wolff, Lomonosov had fierce disputes with Henckel over the training and education courses he and his two compatriot students were getting in Freiberg, as well as over very limited financial support which Henckel was instructed to provide to the Russians after numerous debts they had accumulated in Marburg. As the result, Lomonosov left Freiberg without permission and wandered for quite a while over Germany and Holland, unsuccessfully trying to obtain permission from Russian envoys to return to the St. Petersburg Academy.

During his residence in Marburg, Lomonosov boarded with Catharina Zilch, a brewer's widow. He fell in love with Catharina's daughter Elisabeth Christine Zilch. They were married in June 1740. Lomonosov found it extremely difficult to maintain his growing family on the scanty and irregular allowance granted him by the Russian Academy of Sciences. As his circumstances became desperate, he got permission to return to Saint Petersburg.

=== Return to Russia ===
Lomonosov returned to Russia in June 1741, after being abroad 4 years and 8 months. A year later he was named an Adjunct of the Russian Academy of Science in the physics department. In May 1743, Lomonosov was accused, arrested, and held under house arrest for eight months, after he supposedly insulted various people associated with the academy. He was released and pardoned in January 1744 after apologising to all involved.

Lomonosov was made a full member of the academy and named professor of chemistry in 1745, becoming the first Russian professor of chemistry at the academy. He established the academy's first chemistry laboratory. Eager to improve Russia's educational system, in 1755, Lomonosov joined his patron Count Ivan Shuvalov in founding Moscow University.

In 1760, he was elected a Foreign Member of the Royal Swedish Academy of Sciences. In 1764, he was elected Foreign Member of the Academy of Sciences of the Institute of Bologna. In 1764, Lomonosov was appointed to the position of the State Councillor which was of Rank V in the Russian Empire's Table of Ranks. He died on 15 April [O.S. 4 April] 1765 1765 in Saint Petersburg. He is widely and deservingly regarded as the "Father of Russian Science," though many of his scientific accomplishments were relatively unknown outside Russia until long after his death and gained proper appreciation only in late 19th and, especially, 20th centuries.

== Science and inventions ==
=== Physics ===
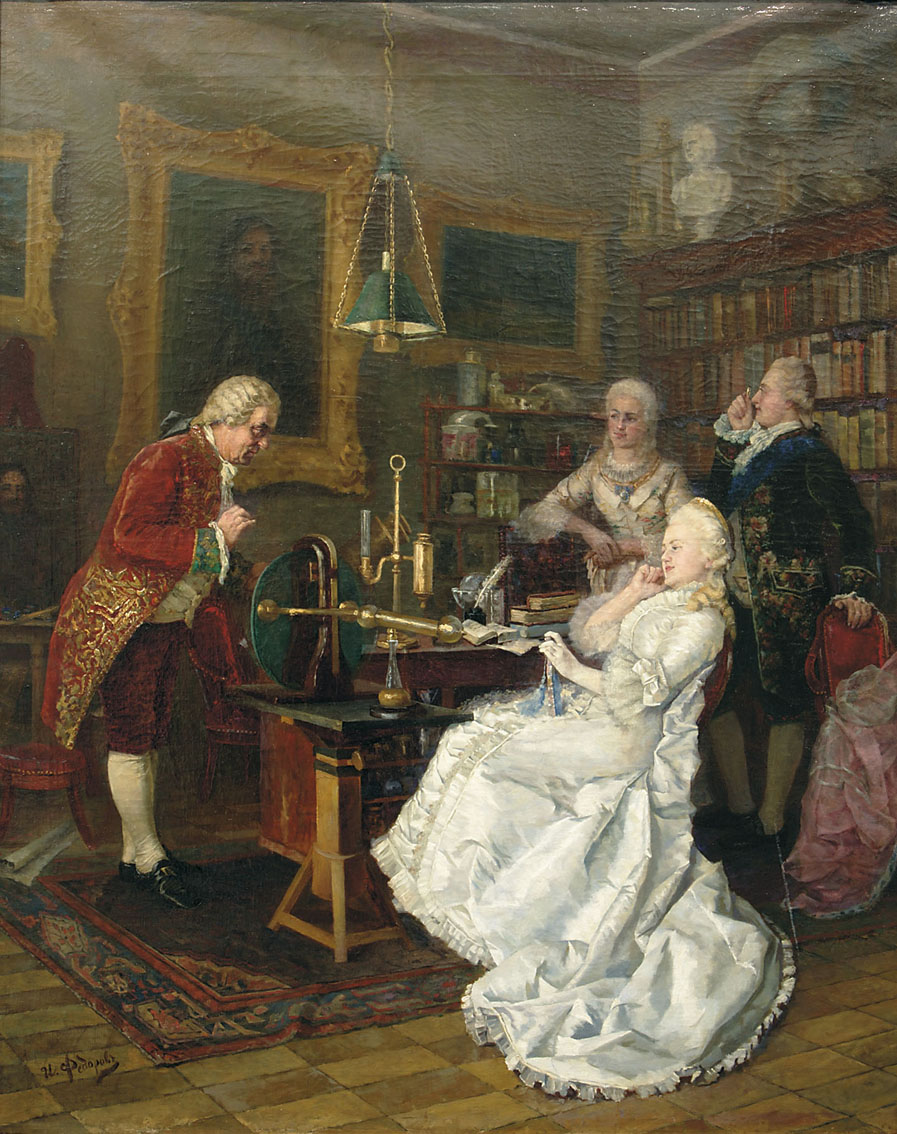
Catherine II of Russia visits Mikhail Lomonosov in 1764. 1884 painting by Ivan Feodorov.

In 1756, Lomonosov tried to replicate Robert Boyle's experiment of 1673. He concluded that the commonly accepted phlogiston theory was false. Anticipating the discoveries of Antoine Lavoisier, he wrote in his diary: "Today I made an experiment in hermetic glass vessels in order to determine whether the mass of metals increases from the action of pure heat. The experiments – of which I append the record in 13 pages – demonstrated that the famous Robert Boyle was deluded, for without access of air from outside the mass of the burnt metal remains the same."

That is the Law of Mass Conservation in chemical reaction, which is well-known today as "in a chemical reaction, the mass of reactants is equal to the mass of the products." Lomonosov, together with Lavoisier, is regarded as the one who discovered the law of mass conservation.

He stated that all matter is composed of corpuscles – molecules that are "collections" of elements – atoms. In his dissertation "Elements of Mathematical Chemistry" (1741, unfinished), the scientist gives the following definition: "An element is a part of a body that does not consist of any other smaller and different bodies ... corpuscle is a collection of elements forming one small mass." In a later study (1748), he uses the term "atom" instead of "element", and "particula" (particle) or "molecule" instead of "corpuscle."

He regarded heat as a form of motion, suggested the wave theory of light, contributed to the formulation of the kinetic theory of gases, and stated the idea of conservation of matter in the following words: "All changes in nature are such that inasmuch is taken from one object insomuch is added to another. So, if the amount of matter decreases in one place, it increases elsewhere. This universal law of nature embraces laws of motion as well, for an object moving others by its own force in fact imparts to another object the force it loses" (first articulated in a letter to Leonhard Euler dated 5 July 1748, rephrased and published in Lomonosov's dissertation "Reflexion on the solidity and fluidity of bodies," 1760).

=== Astronomy ===
Scheme of the Lomonosov-Effect during a transit of Venus

Lomonosov discovered the atmosphere of Venus during his observation of the transit of Venus of 1761 from a small observatory near his house in St Petersburg. He inferred the atmosphere from an arc around the planet at its ingress and egress, correctly attributing it to refraction of sunlight in Venus's atmosphere. The effect became known in the literature as "Lomonosov's arc" and has since been observed by many astronomers watching the Venus transits of the 18th, 19th, and 21st centuries. Doubts about the feasibility of such an observation with 18th-century telescopes, and about the correct interpretation of Lomonosov's report, were convincingly resolved by the 2012 transit of Venus experiment, which replicated the observation using several antique refractors and confirmed Lomonosov's account: his instrument proved fully adequate to detect the atmospheric arc under the observing methods and conditions he described. Later transits — notably 1874, 1882, 2004, and 2012, together with 18th-century observations by several others, including Rittenhouse in June 1769, — have further clarified the character of the atmospheric arc phenomenon that bears Lomonosov's name.

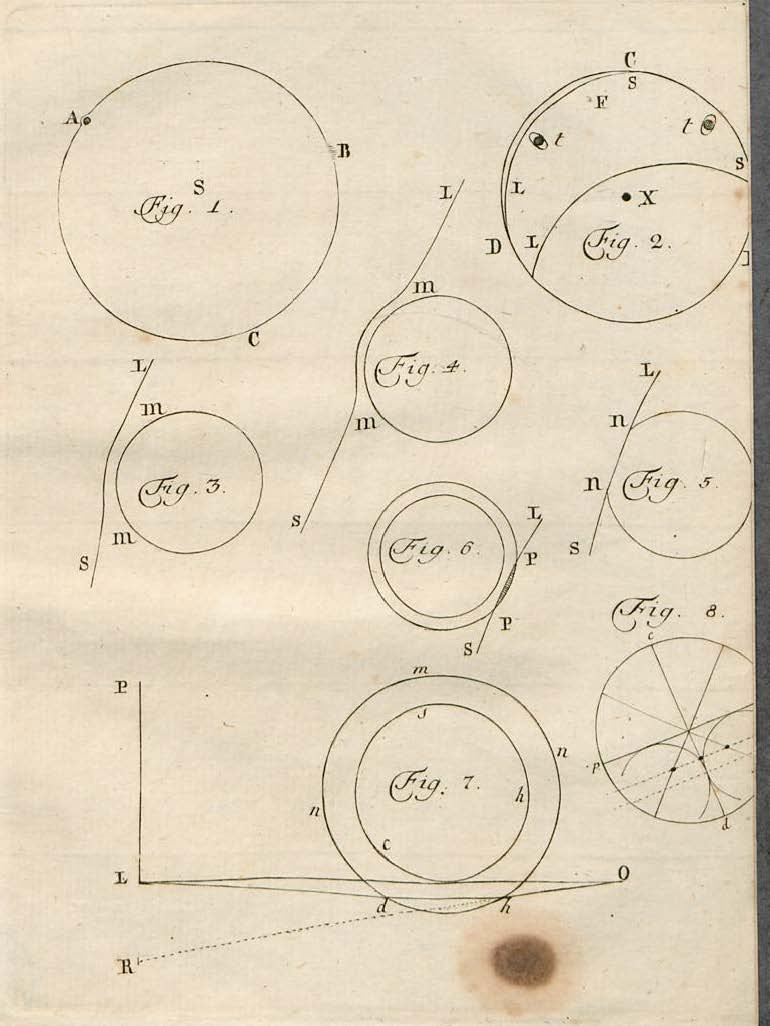
Diagrams from Mikhail Lomonosov's "The Appearance of Venus on the Sun, Observed at the St. Petersburg Imperial Academy of Sciences on 26 May 1761"

In 1762, Lomonosov presented an improved design of a reflecting telescope to the Russian Academy of Sciences forum. His telescope had its primary mirror adjusted at an angle of one to three degrees to the telescope's axis. This made the image focus at the side of the telescope tube, where the observer could view the image with an eyepiece without blocking the image. This invention was not published until 1827, so this type of telescope has become associated with a similar design by William Herschel, the Herschelian telescope.

=== Chemistry and geology ===
In 1759, with his collaborator, academician Joseph Adam Braun, Lomonosov was the first person to record the freezing of mercury and to carry out initial experiments with it. Believing that nature is subject to regular and continuous evolution, he demonstrated the organic origin of soil, peat, coal, petroleum and amber. In 1745, he published a catalogue of over 3,000 minerals, and in 1760, he explained the formation of icebergs.

In 1763, he published On The Strata of the Earth – his most significant geological work. This work puts him before James Hutton, who has been traditionally regarded as the founder of modern geology. Lomonosov based his conceptions on the unity of the Earth's processes in time, and necessity to explain the planet's past from present.

Lomonosov also contributed in the field of petroleum science. He was already conducting distillation experiments on crude oil way before similar experiments were conducted in the West by chemists such as Benjamin Silliman, Jr. His works include his findings that oil has a biogenic origin and that the petroleum migrated from source rocks to reservoir rocks.

=== Geography ===
Lomonosov's observation of iceberg formation led into his pioneering work in geography. Lomonosov got close to the theory of continental drift, theoretically predicted the existence of Antarctica (he argued that icebergs of the Southern Ocean could be formed only on a dry land covered with ice), and invented sea tools which made writing and calculating directions and distances easier. In 1764, he organized an expedition (led by Admiral Vasili Chichagov) to find the Northeast Passage between the Atlantic and Pacific oceans by sailing along the northern coast of Siberia.

=== Engineering ===
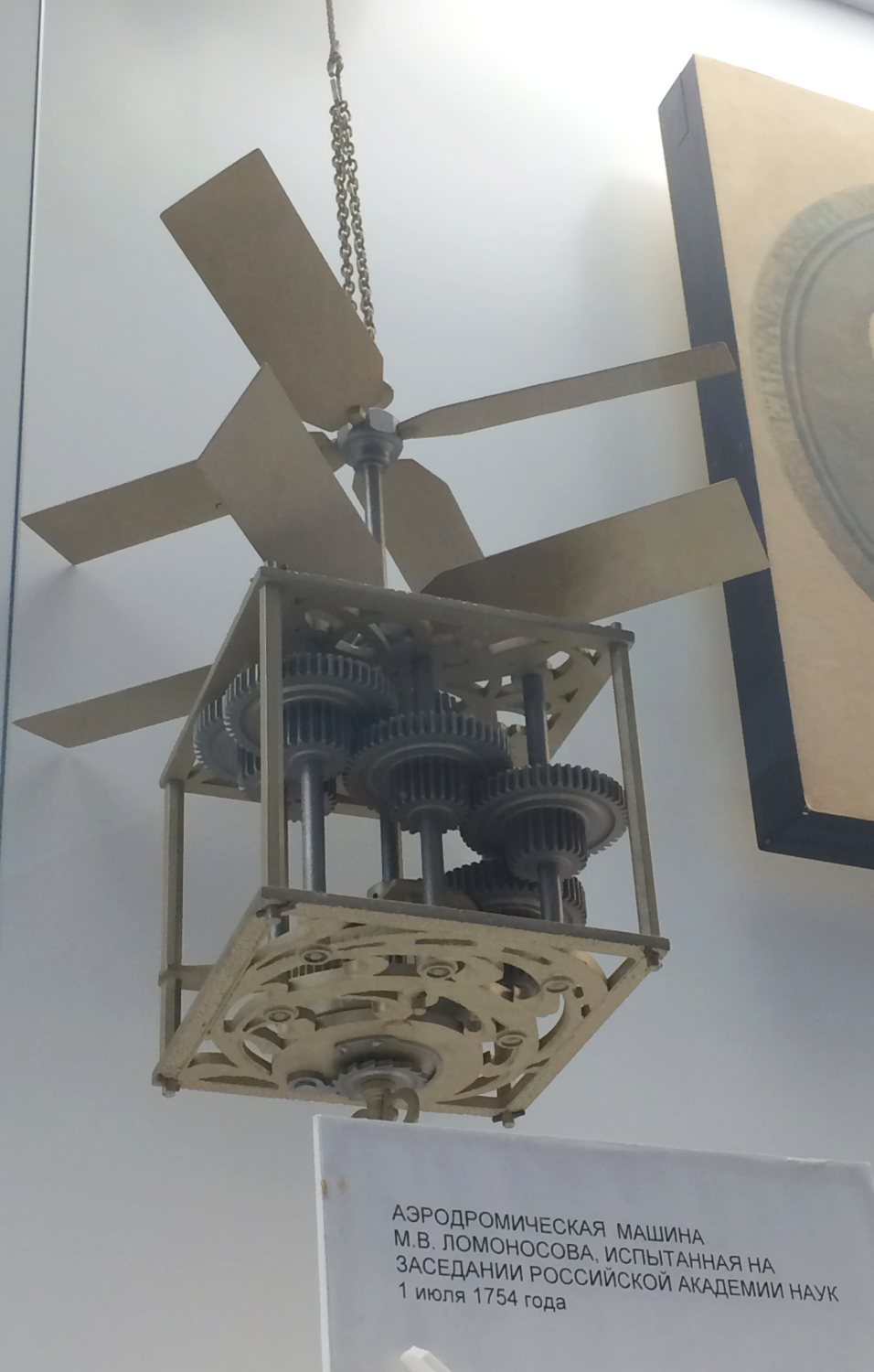
A first ever spring-driven coaxial rotor

The idea of a coaxial rotor originated from Mikhail Lomonosov. In July 1754, he developed a model of a small helicopter with a coaxial rotor and demonstrated it to the Russian Academy of Sciences.

=== Mosaic ===
Lomonosov was proud to restore the ancient art of mosaics. In 1754, in his letter to Leonhard Euler, he wrote that his three years of experiments on the effects of chemistry of minerals on their colour led to his deep involvement in the mosaic art. In 1763, he set up a glass factory that produced the first stained glass mosaics outside of Italy. There were forty mosaics attributed to Lomonosov, with only twenty-four surviving to the present day. Among the best is the portrait of Peter the Great and the Battle of Poltava, measuring 4.8 by 6.4 metres (16 ft × 21 ft).

=== Grammarian, poet, historian ===
Besides his scientific activities, Lomonosov also paid considerable attention to literature. Together with his contemporaries Alexander Sumarokov and Vasily Trediakovsky, Lomonosov sought the creation of a system of Russian linguistic conventions, syntax and prosody which would allow the advancement of a native literary tradition on the basis of Western European genres. He laid out his literary theories in his work "Epistle on the Rules of Russian Versification" (1739). Lomonosov is considered the founder of accentual-syllabic (or syllabo-tonic) verse in Russian poetry, although statistical analysis suggests the adoption of this system was already in progress when Lomonosov publicized his theories. His "Ode on the Taking of Khotin" has been called the first "aesthetically indisputable example" of accentual-syllabic verse in the history of Russian literature. The iambic tetrameter and hexameter verse and the ten-line odic stanza which he developed had a lasting role in Russian poetry. His advocacy of the iamb won out over Trediakovsky's arguments for the trochee as the basic metrical foot.

Lomonosov wrote solemn occasional, spiritual, as natural-philosophical odes, as well as an Anacreontic ode. According to A. Kahn, "the turgidity of the Lomonosovian ode derives from a propensity to create semantic clusters, usually through etymologic play or tropes, such as zeugma." His "Evening Meditation on God's Grandeur" and "Morning Meditation on God's Grandeur" are the first Russian poems on the theme of sublime admiration of nature. He applied an idiosyncratic theory to his later poems – tender subjects needed words containing the front vowel sounds E, I, Y and U, whereas things that may cause fear (like "anger", "envy", "pain" and "sorrow") needed words with back vowel sounds O, U and Y. That was a version of what is now called sound symbolism. He also wrote two verse tragedies, Tamira i Selim and Demofont.

Lomonosov wrote an important Russian grammar in 1755 (published in 1757), in which he distinguished Old Church Slavonic and colloquial Russian forms. His work on rhetoric "Kratkoye rukovodstvo k krasnorechiyu" (Brief guide to eloquence, 1748) is the first such work in Russian and expounds a theory of literature on the basis of Russian literary models. His treatise "Predisloviye o polze knig tserkovnykh v rossiyskom yazyke" (Introduction to the usefulness of church books in the Russian language, 1757) is the first Russian work on stylistics. Lomonosov adopted classical views on the existence of three distinct styles—high, middle, and low—and applied them to the Russian literary language. It also addresses the problems of the combination of Church Slavonic and Russian forms and the categorization of literary genres. In 1760, Lomonosov published a history of Russia. In addition, he attempted to write a grand Aeneid-inspired epic about Peter the Great, but he died before he could finish it.

== Legacy ==
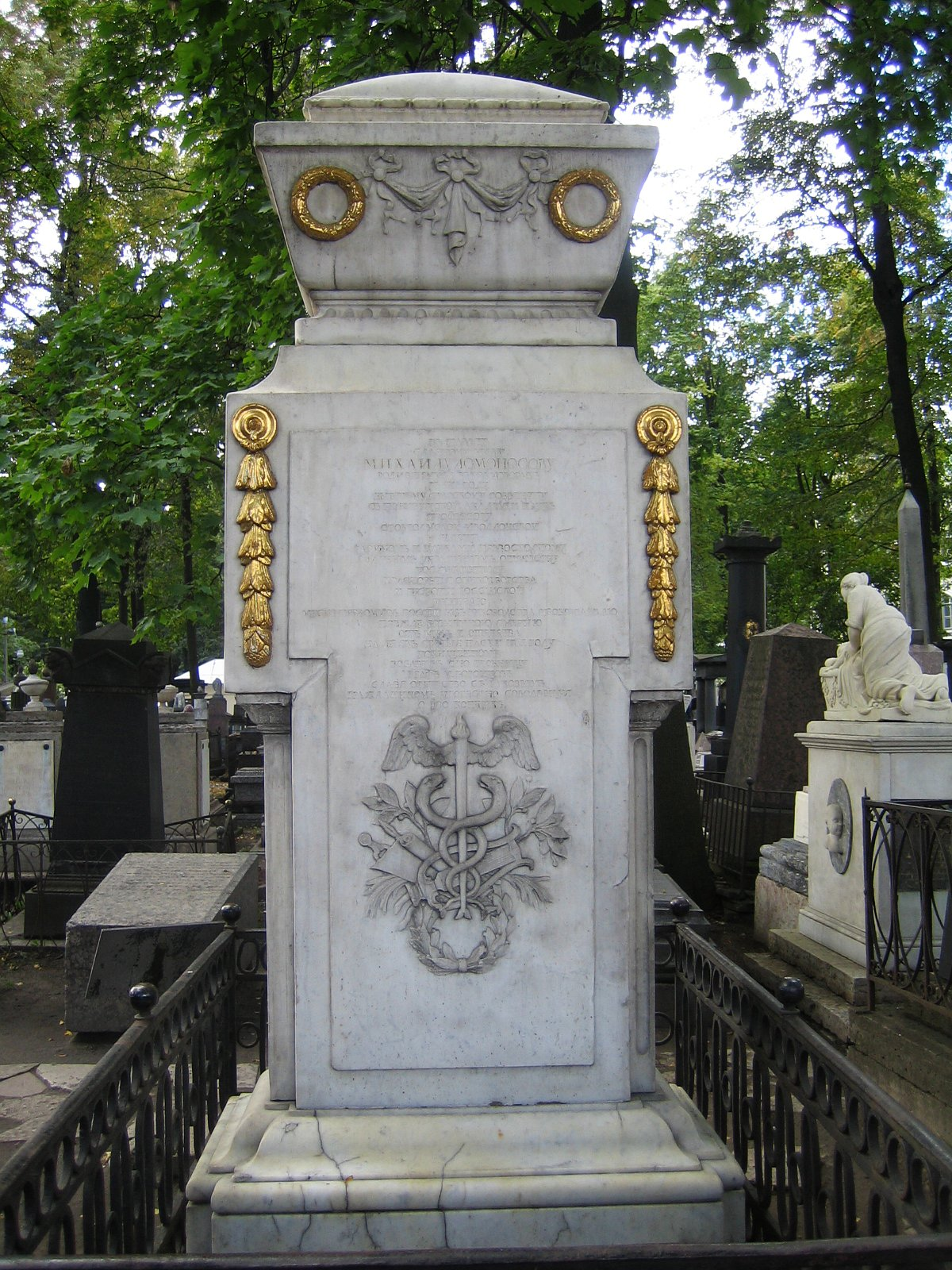
The grave of Lomonosov in Lazarevskoe Cemetery, Alexander Nevsky Lavra, Saint Petersburg

His granddaughter Sophia Konstantinova (1769–1844) married Russian military hero and statesman General Nikolay Raevsky. His great-granddaughter was Princess Maria (Raevskaya) Volkonskaya, the wife of the Decembrist Prince Sergei Volkonsky.

The city of Lomonosov, Russia (formerly Oranienbaum), and a lunar crater bear his name, as do a crater on Mars and the asteroid 1379 Lomonosowa. A Russian satellite launched in 2016 was named Mikhailo Lomonosov after him. The Imperial Porcelain Factory, Saint Petersburg was renamed after him from 1925 to 2005. In 1948, the underwater Lomonosov Ridge in the Arctic Ocean was named in his honor.

Lomonosov Bridge in Saint Petersburg was named after the polymath. Originally called Tchernyshov Bridge (Chernyshev Bridge) in honour of Count Grigory Tchernyshov (Chernyshev) one of Peter the Great's most prominent generals, whose estates were located nearby, the bridge was erected in 1785–1987, and replaced a wooden bridge which had previously stood at the site. It was one of seven moveable stone bridges of similar design crossing the Fontanka River, built simultaneously with the river's granite embankments. Only Lomonosov Bridge and Staro-Kalinkin Bridge have survived more or less intact.

Moscow's Domodedovo airport is officially named after Lomonosov.

The Lomonosov Gold Medal was established in 1959 and is awarded annually by the Russian Academy of Sciences to a Russian and a foreign scientist.

Lomonosovskaya Station on the Nevsko-Vasileostrovskaya Line of the Saint Petersburg Metro is named after him. It was opened in 1970.

The street "Lomonosova iela" in the Maskavas Forštate district of Riga is named in honor of Lomonosov. During the Soviet era, a main street in Tallinn, Estonia, was named in his honor as "M. Lomonossovi", but from 1991, the year when Estonia restored its independence, the street was renamed Gonsiori after Jakob Johann Gonsior, a 19th-century alderman and lawyer.

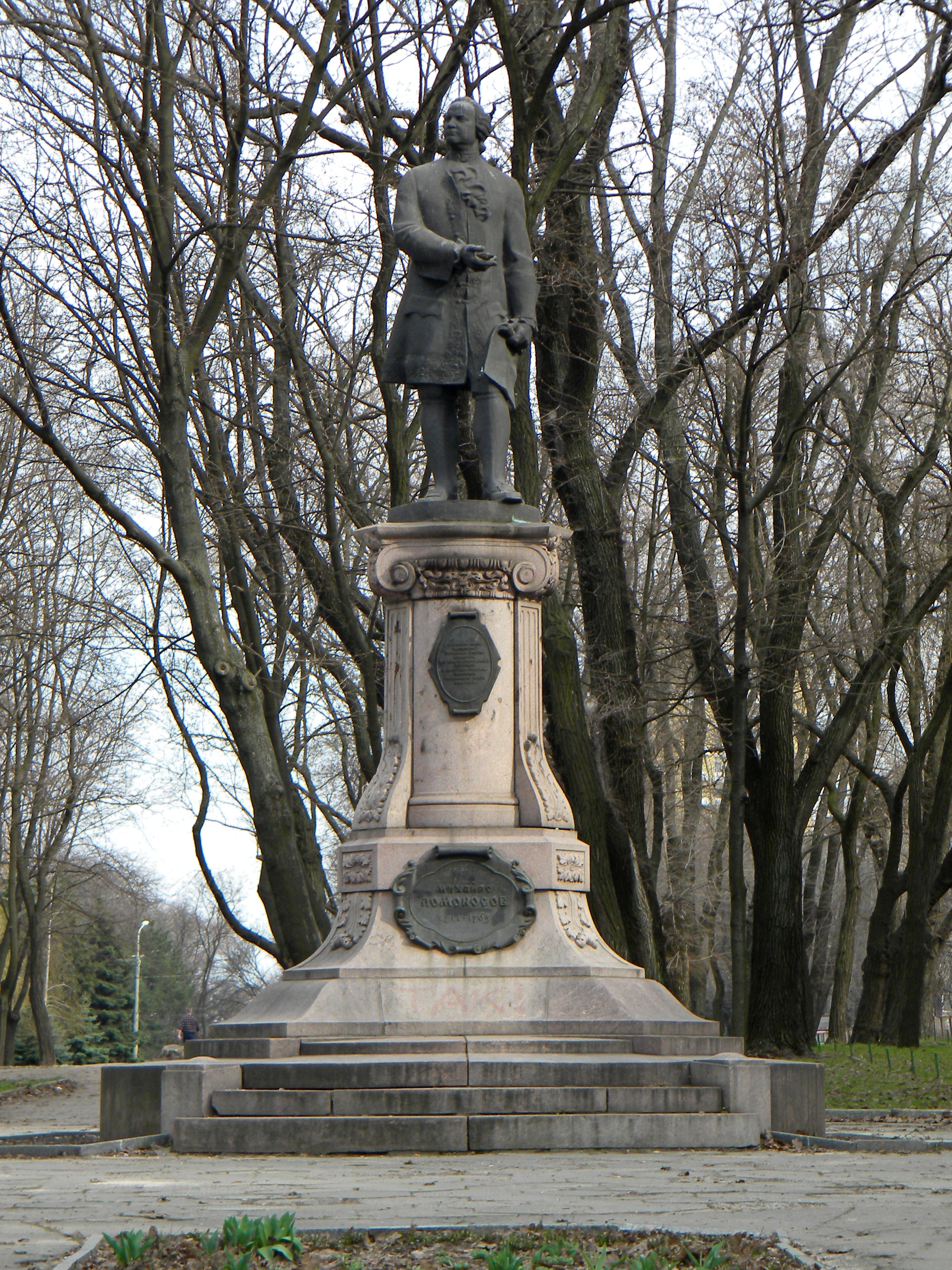
Lomonosov statue in Dnipro, Ukraine in 2010, removed in January 2023

In Dnipro, Ukraine, a statue of Lomonosov replaced a statue of Catherine the Great in 1919. It stood until 6 January 2023, when it was removed by the city of Dnipro because of Russia's full-scale invasion into Ukraine.

On 19 November 2011, Google celebrated his 300th birthday with a Google Doodle.

A great number of different stamps was issued in honor of Lomonosov throughout the years: Mikhail Lomonosov and the Academy of Sciences building in Leningrad stamp of 1925, stamps depicting Lomonosov issued in 1949, in 1956 and in 1961, a 275th Birth Anniversary of M.V. Lomonosov stamp of 1986, a History of Russia (Ekaterina II) stamp depicting Lomonosov and his study room talking to the queen that was issued in 2004, three 300th Anniversary of the Birth of M.V. Lomonosov stamps were issued in 2011.

The Akademik Lomonosov, the first of a series of Russian floating nuclear power stations, is named after him. It started operation on 19 December 2019.

Moscow State University, founded by him in 1755, was renamed M. V. Lomonosov Moscow State University in 1940, while celebrating its 185th anniversary. There are also Moscow Institute of Mechanics and Electrical Engineering M.V. Lomonosov (Lomonosov Institute), Lomonosov Institute of Geochemistry, Mineralogy and Petrography, USSR Academy of Sciences in Moscow, Lomonosov Northern (Arctic) Federal University, Odessa Technological Institute of Food Industry n.a. M.V. Lomonosov, Moscow State University of Fine Chemical Technologies n.a. M.V. Lomonosov, and several other schools in Russia and Kazakhstan.

On 19 November 1986, on the 275th anniversary of the birth of M.V. Lomonosov, the USSR State Bank issued a 1 ruble commemorative coin from a copper-nickel alloy.

On 6 December 2022, the City Council of the Ukrainian city Dnipro decided to remove from the city all monuments to figures of Russian culture and history, in particular it was mentioned that the monuments to Lomonosov, Alexander Pushkin and Maxim Gorky would be removed from the public space of the city.

== Works ==
English translations

- Lomonosov, Mikhail (1767). A Chronological Abridgement of the Russian History. Translated by J.G.A.F. for T. Snelling. [London, Printed for T. Snelling].
- Lomonosov, Mikhail (1966). Panegyric to the Sovereign Emperor, Peter the Great. Translated by Ronald Hingley in Marc Raeff, ed. Russian Intellectual History: An Anthology. Prometheus Books. ISBN 978-0391009059.
- Lomonosov, Mikhail (1970). Mikhail Vasil'evich Lomonosov on the Corpuscular Theory. Translated by Henry M. Leicester. Harvard University Press. ISBN 978-0674574205.
- Lomonosov, Mikhail (2012). The Appearance of Venus on the Sun, Observed at the St.Petersburg Imperial Academy of Sciences on May 26, 1761. Translated by Vladimir Shiltsev in "Lomonosov's Discovery of Venus Atmosphere in 1761: English Translation of Original Publication with Commentaries". arXiv:1206.3489.
- Lomonosov, Mikhail (2012). On the Strata of the Earth. Translation and commentary by S.M. Rowland and S. Korolev. The Geological Society of America, Special Paper 485. ISBN 978-0-8137-2485-0.
- Lomonosov, Mikhail (2017). Oratio De Meteoris Vi Electrica Ortis – Discourse on Atmospheric Phenomena Originating from Electrical Force (1753). Translation and commentary by Vladimir Shiltsev. arXiv:1709.08847.
- Lomonosov, Mikhail (2018). Meditations on Solidity and Fluidity of Bodies (1760). Translation and commentary by Vladimir Shiltsev. arXiv:1801.00909.

German translations

- Lomonossow, Michail (1961). Michail Wassiljewitsch Lomonossow. Ausgewählte Schriften in zwei Bänden. Berlin-Akademie Verlag.
- Lomonosov, Michail (2015). Erste Grundlagen Der Metallurgie Oder Des Huttenwesens (1763). Herausgegeben und kommentiert von Friedrich Naumann. Walter de Gruyter. ISBN 978-3110424072.
- Lomonosov, Michail (2017). Naumann, Friedrich (ed.). Schriften zur Geologie und zum Berg- und Hüttenwesen (1742–1765). Herausgegeben und kommentiert von Friedrich Naumann. Walter de Gruyter. doi:10.1515/9783110424065. ISBN 978-3-11-042406-5. Archived from the original on 30 January 2018.

== See also ==
- Christian Wolff (philosopher)
- Dmitry Ivanovich Vinogradov
- Franz Aepinus
- Gerhard Friedrich Müller
- Ivan Kulibin
- Jean-Baptiste Chappe d'Auteroche
- Johann Daniel Schumacher
- Joseph-Nicolas Delisle
- Northern (Arctic) Federal University
- Stepan Krasheninnikov
- Stepan Rumovsky
- Vasily Trediakovsky
