= Kholmogorsky District =

Kholmogorsky District Холмогорский район (Russian)
- District
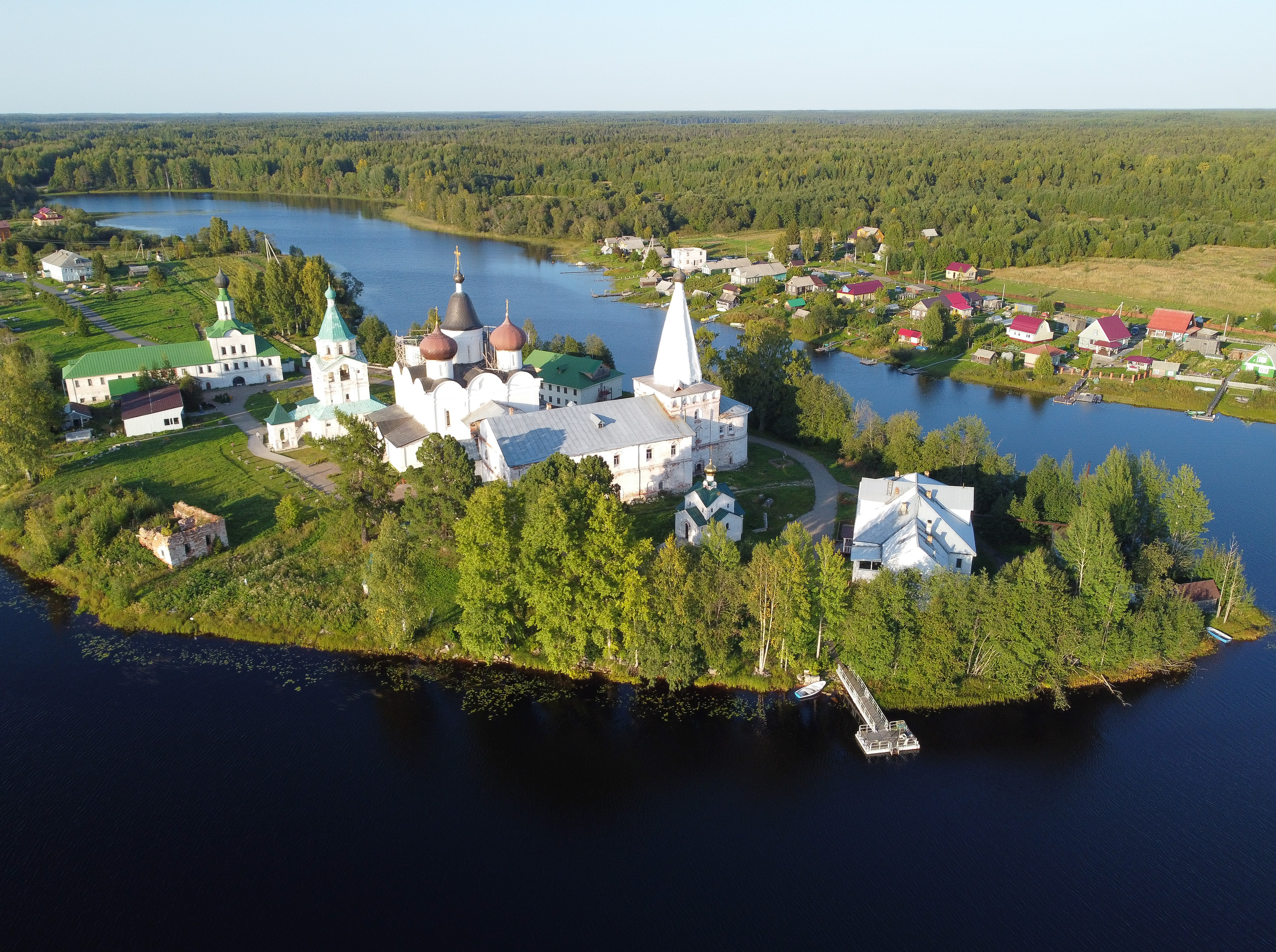
- Siya Monastery of St. Antonius, Kholmogorsky District

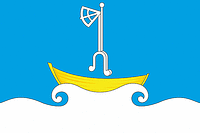
- Flag Coat of arms
- Location of Kholmogorsky District in Arkhangelsk Oblast
- Coordinates: 64°13′N 41°39′E
- Country: Russia
- Federal subject: Arkhangelsk Oblast
- Established: July 15, 1929
- Administrative center: Kholmogory

Area
  - Total: 16,827 km^{2} (6,497 sq mi)

Population (2010 Census)
  - Total: 25,061
  - Density: 1.4893/km^{2} (3.8574/sq mi)
  - Urban: 0%
  - Rural: 100%

Administrative structure
  - Administrative divisions: 18 Selsoviets
  - Inhabited localities: 423 rural localities

Municipal structure
  - Municipally incorporated as: Kholmogorsky Municipal District
  - Municipal divisions: 0 urban settlements, 17 rural settlements
- Time zone: UTC+3 (MSK)
- OKTMO ID: 11656000
- Website: http://www.holmogori.ru

Kholmogorsky District (Russian: Холмого́рский райо́н) is an administrative district (raion), one of the twenty-one in Arkhangelsk Oblast, Russia. Municipally, it is incorporated as Kholmogorsky Municipal District. It is located in the center of the oblast and borders with Pinezhsky District in the east, Vinogradovsky District in the southeast, the territory of the town of oblast significance of Mirny in the south, Plesetsky District in the southwest, and with Primorsky District in the northwest. The area of the district is 16,827 square kilometers (6,497 sq mi). Its administrative center is the rural locality (a selo) of Kholmogory. District's population: 25,061 (2010 census); 30,797 (2002 census); 35,891 (1989 Soviet census). The population of Kholmogory accounts for 16.6% of the district's total population.

== Geography ==
The district is elongated from south to north and is crossed by the Northern Dvina River which divides it into two roughly equal parts. Almost the whole of the district belongs to the basins of the Northern Dvina River and its major tributaries. The main Northern Dvina tributaries within the district are the Yemtsa (left), the Pukshenga (right), and the Pinega (right). A minor area in the north of the district lies in the basin of the Kyolda River, a left tributary of the Kuloy. There are many glacial lakes, especially on the right bank of the Northern Dvina.

A major part of the district is covered by coniferous forests (taiga).

Siysky Zakaznik, a nature reserve located within the district limits, is designated as a protected natural area at the federal level.

== History ==
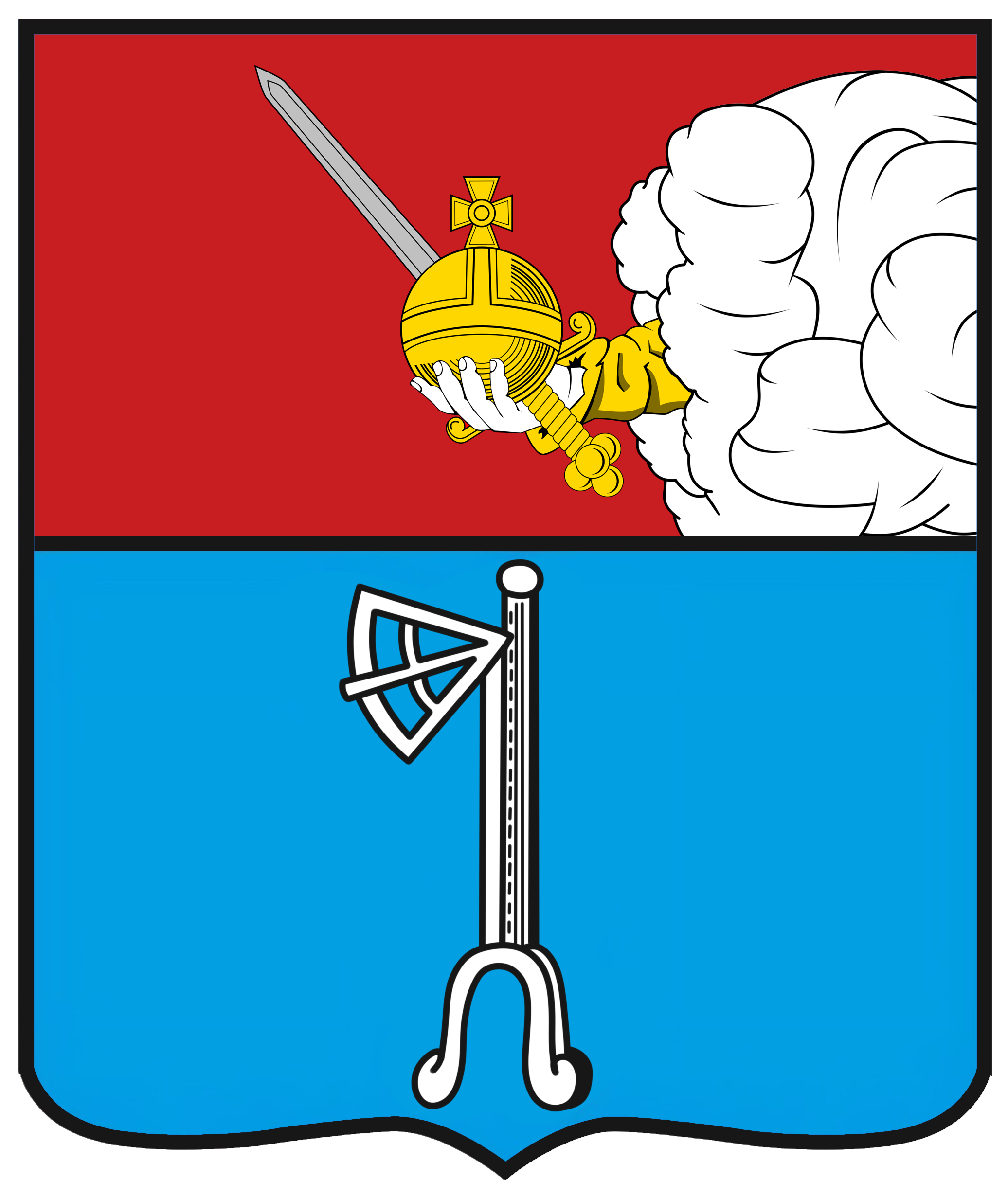
Coat of arms of Kholmogory from 1780

The area was populated by speakers of Uralic languages and then colonized by the Novgorod Republic. After the fall of Novgorod, the area became a part of the Grand Duchy of Moscow.

Kholmogory (then Kolmogory) was known since the 14th century and quickly established itself as one of the most important trading settlements in the North of Russia. After Arkhangelsk was founded in 1584, Kholmogory eventually declined. Since 1707, it was a posad subordinated to Arkhangelsk. Still, between 1682 and 1762, Kholmogory was the seat of the Kholmogory and Vaga Eparchy (from 1732 known as Kholmogory and Archangelogorod Eparchy) which had jurisdiction basically over all Northern Russia including the Solovetsky Monastery.

In the course of the administrative reform carried out in 1708 by Peter the Great, the area was included into Archangelgorod Governorate. In 1780, the governorate was abolished and transformed into Vologda Viceroyalty, with the creation of Kholmogorsky Uyezd. In 1796, Kholmogorsky Uyezd was transferred to Arkhangelsk Governorate.

In 1922, Kholmogorsky Uyezd was renamed Yemetsky Uyezd, and the uyezd's administrative center was moved to Yemetsk. On May 15, 1925, Yemetsky Uyezd was abolished and merged into Arkhangelsky Uyezd. In 1929, several governorates were merged into Northern Krai. On July 15, 1929, the uyezds were abolished and Kholmogorsky and Yemetsky Districts were established on the territory which had previously been a part of Kholmogorsky and Arkhangelsky Uyezds. These districts became a part of Arkhangelsk Okrug of Northern Krai.

In the following years, the first-level administrative division of Russia kept changing. In 1930, the okrug was abolished, and the district was subordinated to the central administration of Northern Krai. In 1936, the krai itself was transformed into Northern Oblast. In 1937, Northern Oblast was split into Arkhangelsk Oblast and Vologda Oblast. Kholmogorsky District remained in Arkhangelsk Oblast ever since, but Yemetsky District was abolished and merged into Kholmogorsky District in 1959.

== Divisions ==
=== Administrative divisions ===
Administratively, the district is divided into eighteen selsoviets. One locality which previously had urban-type settlement status, Lukovetsky, was downgraded to rural locality in 2005. The following selsoviets have been established (the administrative centers are given in parentheses):

- Belogorsky (Belogorsky)
- Dvinskoy (Dvinskoy)
- Kekhotsky (Grigorovskaya)
- Khavrogorsky (Pogost)
- Kholmogorsky (Kholmogory)
- Koydokursky (Khomyakovskaya)
- Kopachevsky (Kopachevo)
- Leunovsky (Kuzomen)
- Lomonosovsky (Lomonosovo)
- Lukovetsky (Lukovetsky)
- Matigorsky (Kharlovo)
- Rakulsky (Chasovenskaya)
- Seletsky (Pogost)
- Svetlozyorsky (Svetly)
- Ust-Pinezhsky (Ust-Pinega)
- Ukhtoostrovsky (Andrianovskaya)
- Yemetsky (Yemetsk)
- Zachatyevsky (Zabolotye)

=== Municipal divisions ===
Municipally, the district is divided into seventeen rural settlements (the administrative centers are given in parentheses):

- Belogorskoye Rural Settlement (Belogorsky)
- Dvinskoye Rural Settlement (Dvinskoy)
- Kekhotskoye Rural Settlement (Markovskaya)
- Khavrogorskoye Rural Settlement (Pogost)
- Kholmogorskoye Rural Settlement (Kholmogory)
- Koydokurskoye Rural Settlement (Khomyakovskaya)
- Kopachevskoye Rural Settlement (Kopachevo)
- Leunovskoye Rural Settlement (Kuzomen)
- Lukovetskoye Rural Settlement (Lukovetsky)
- Matigorskoye Rural Settlement (Kharlovo)
- Rakulskoye Rural Settlement (Brin-Navolok)
- Seletskoye Rural Settlement (Pogost)
- Svetlozyorskoye Rural Settlement (Svetly)
- Ust-Pinezhskoye Rural Settlement (Ust-Pinega)
- Ukhtoostrovskoye Rural Settlement (Gorka-Kuznechevskaya)
- Yemetskoye Rural Settlement (Yemetsk)
- Zachatyevskoye Rural Settlement (Zabolotye)

== Economy ==
=== Industry ===
Timber industry is the main industry of the district. Food industry is also present.

=== Agriculture ===
In 2010, there were eleven large-scale farms and four small private farms in the district. These produced meat (beef and pork), milk, cereals, and potatoes.

In the past, the area around Kholmogory was famous for a special cattle breed, Kholmogory cattle, which was bred in Kholmogory and Arkhangelsk countryside. This breed, mostly black and white, was particularly stable against the cold climate of Northern Russia and eventually spread well beyond this region. Incidentally, the Kholmogory geese breed originates from Central Russia.

=== Transportation ===
A railway line connecting Arkhangelsk and Karpogory passes through the northern part of the district. This line is expected to become a part of the Belkomur project—a railway line connecting Arkhangelsk via the Komi Republic with Perm Krai and the Ural Mountains. The stretch between Arkhangelsk and Karpogory was built in the 1970s. Kholmogorskaya railway station on the railroad between Moscow and Arkhangelsk is located in Plesetsky District.

The Northern Dvina and the Pinega Rivers are navigable, although there is no regular passenger navigation.

One of the principal highways in Russia, M8 connecting Moscow and Arkhangelsk, crosses the district from south to north, on the left bank of the Northern Dvina. An important road on the right bank connects Arkhangelsk with the valley of the Pinega and eventually of the Mezen. The road within the limits of the district is not paved.

== Culture and recreation ==
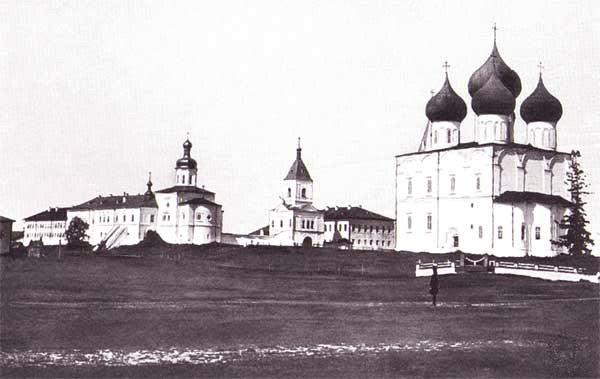
Cathedral Square in Kholmogory, 19th century

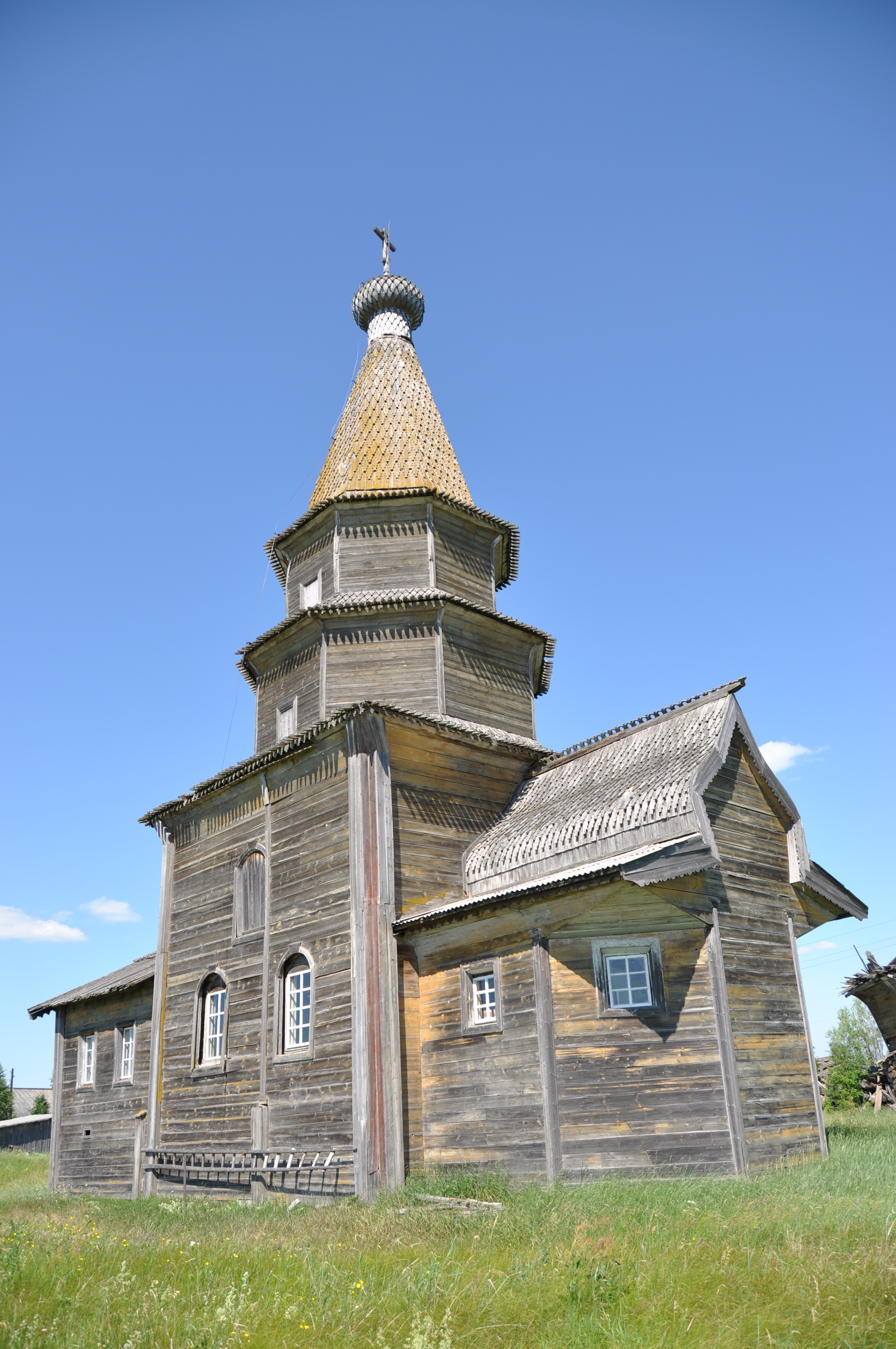
The St. Peter and St. Paul church in Ratonavolok (1732)

The district contains forty objects classified as cultural and historical heritage by Russian Federal law, and additionally four objects classified as cultural and historical heritage of local importance. Most of these are churches built prior to 1917. These include the ensemble of the Antonievo-Siysky Monastery of the 17th century (the oldest survived building of the monastery, the Trinity Cathedral, was built in 1589–1606), the Transfiguration Cathedral in Kholmogory (1685–1691), and the wooden St. Peter and St. Paul church in the village of Ratonavolok (1722).

There are three state museums in the district: the Kholmogorsky District Museum in Kholmogory, the Mikhail Lomonosov Memorial Museum in the selo of Lomonosovo, located in the historical building of a school constructed in 1892 on the same place where the house of Lomonosov previously stood, and the Nikolay Rubtsov Yemetsky Local Museum in Yemetsk. There is a local museum in the selo of Rakula.

In Kholmogory, the craft of Kholmogory bone carving was developed in the 17th century. Bone carvings from Kholmogory were notable for excellent craftsmanship and perfected technique. The best carving masters from Kholmogory were invited to work in the Kremlin Armory, which performed orders for the Tsar's court. The handicraft reached its peak under the reign of Peter the Great. Currently, the carving is being performed at the Lomonosov Bone Carving Factory. Famous Russian sculptor Fedot Shubin started his career in Kholmogory as a walrus ivory carver.

== Notable people ==
- Mikhail Lomonosov, a Russian polymath, generally considered to be the creator of the basis of the modern literary Russian language, was born in 1711 in the village of Denisovka (later renamed Lomonosovo in his honor) close to Kholmogory.

Other notable people born within modern district limits include:

- Fedot Shubin (1740, close to Kholmogory), sculptor.
- Nikolay Rubtsov (1936, Yemetsk), poet.

All of them left the area relatively early to pursue their careers elsewhere.
