= Kholmogory, Arkhangelsk Oblast =

Selo and administrative center of Kholmogorsky District, Arkhangelsk Oblast, Russia

Coordinates: 64°13′36″N 41°39′06″E

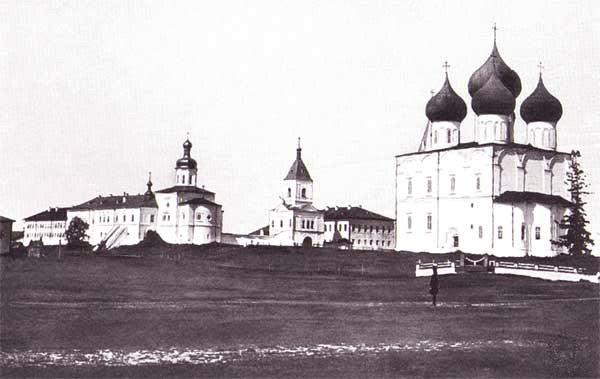
Cathedral Square in Kholmogory, 19th century

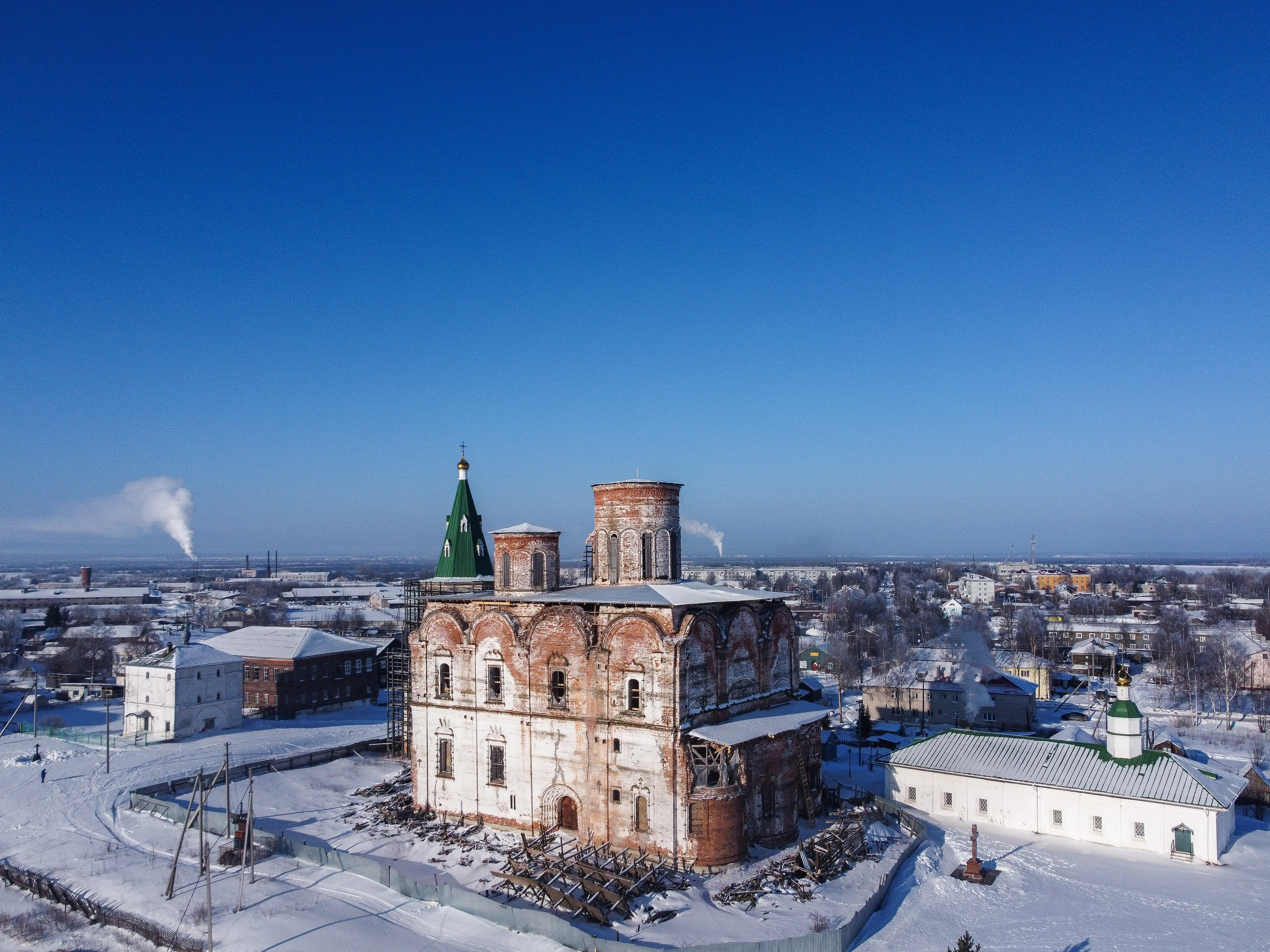
The ruined Kholmogory Cathedral in 2023

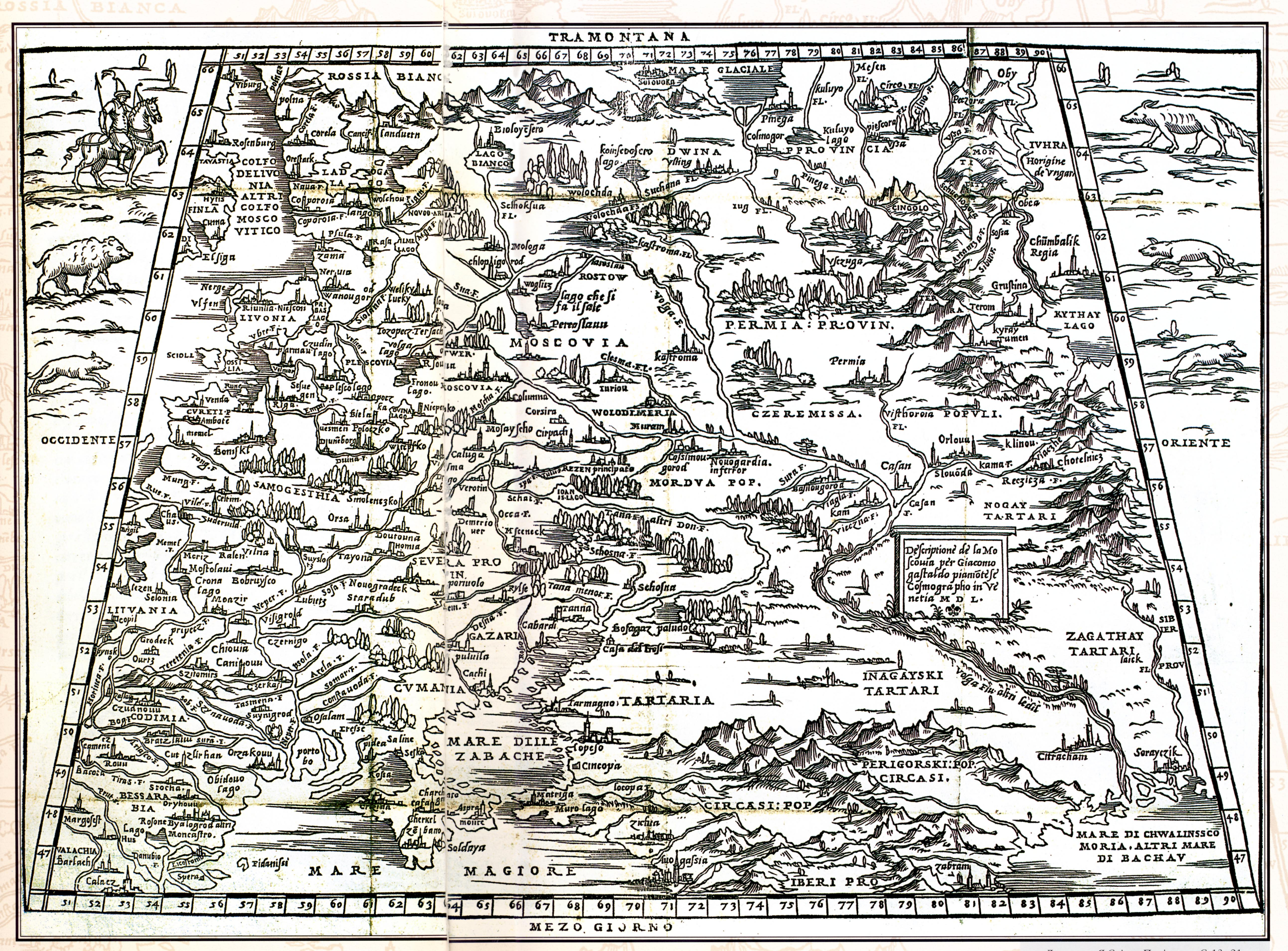
"Colmogor", near "Mare Glaciale", shown on Giacomo Gastaldi's 1550 map of Moscovia

Coat of arms of Kholmogory

Kholmogory (Russian: Холмого́ры) is a historic rural locality (a selo) and the administrative center of Kholmogorsky District of Arkhangelsk Oblast, Russia. It lies on the left bank of the Northern Dvina, along the Kholmogory Highway, 75 kilometers (47 mi) southeast of Arkhangelsk and 90 kilometers (56 mi) north of the Antonievo-Siysky Monastery. The name is derived from the Finnish Kalmomäki for "corpse hill" ("cemetery"). Population: 4,150 (2010 census); 4,592 (2002 census); 5,205 (1989 Soviet census).

The Kholmogory area was at first in historical times inhabited by the Finno-Ugrians "Zavolochskaya Chud", (i.e. "the Chud [who live] beyond the portage"), known also as Yems in old Novgorod chronicles, and Karelians. The first Slavonic population to enter Kalmamäki were Pomors from Vologda area after 1220. As early as the 14th century, the village (the name of which was then spelled Kolmogory) was an important trading post of the Novgorod Republic in the Far North of Russia. Its commercial importance further increased in 1554 when the English Muscovy Company made it a center of its operations in furs. The Polish-Lithuanian irregular forces known as Lisowczycy besieged the wooden fort during the Time of Troubles (1613), but had to retreat in failure.

== Exile and prison camps ==
During the 17th and 18th centuries, the settlement was also a place of exile, notably for ex-regent Anna Leopoldovna and her children including Ivan VI. The use of the location for political prisoners was revived by Mikhail Kedrov, after he was appointed Cheka plenipotentiary for the region. He turned the Kholmogory prison camp into a death camp where mass executions of former officers of the White Army and others he deemed to be political opponents of the Bolshevik regime. The death toll was so large and Kedrov's behaviour so cruel that he was relieved of his duties and put in psychiatric care.

== Cathedral ==
In 1682, the six-pillared Kholmogory cathedral was consecrated; the biggest in the region. It was disfigured by the Communists in the 1930s. Many ancient wooden shrines and mills, however, still survive in the neighborhood. One of the nearby villages is the birthplace of the Russian polymath Mikhail Lomonosov. Local artisans—such as Fedot Shubin—have been famed for their craft of carving the tusks of mammoths and walruses.

In Kholmogory, a craft of Kholmogory bone carving was developed in the 17th century. The bone carvings from Kholmogory were notable for excellent craftsmanship and perfected technique. The best carving masters from Kholmogory were invited to work in the Kremlin Armoury, which performed orders for the tsar's court. The handicraft reached its peak under the reign of Peter the Great. Currently the carving is being performed at the Lomonosov Bone Carving Factory.
