= Ekaterina (TV series) =

Russian television series

- Екатерина
- Genre: History; Serial drama
- Created by: Anton Zlatopolsky
- Written by: Arif Aliev; Andrey Ivanov (series 3); Ivan Zaruvaev (series 3); Yusup Razykov (series 4); Elena Lisasina (series 4); Valeria Zadereeva (series 4)
- Directed by: Alexander Baranov (series 1); Ramil Sabitov (series 1); Dmitry Iosifov (series 2—3); Dmitry Petrun (series 4)
- Starring: Marina Alexandrova; Julia Aug; Aleksandr Yatsenko; Pavel Tabakov; Vladimir Menshov; Konstantin Lavronenko; Alexander Lazarev Jr. Nikolay Kozak; Rinal Mukhametov; Sergey Marin; Artyom Alekseev; Igor Sklyar; Vladimir Yaglych; Sergey Koltakov; Mikhail Gorevoy; Stanislav Strelkov; Alina Tomnikov; Artur Ivanov; Angelina Strechina
- Composers: Nikolay Rostov; Pyotr Frolov-Bagreev (series 4)
- Country of origin: Russia
- Original language: Russian
- No. of seasons: 4
- No. of episodes: 56

Production
- Executive producers: Lilia Chekster; Alexandra Shakhnazarova (series 1); Syuzanna Muazen (series 2—3)
- Producers: Alexander Akopov; Natalia Shneiderova; Tatyana Belichenko (series 1); Alexey Kozin (series 1—2); Ekaterina Efanova (series 1—2); Alexey Kublitsky (series 1—2); Leonid Blavatnik (series 2); Anton Zlatopolsky (series 2—4); Dmitry Golubnichy (series 2—3); Nikolay Rostov (series 3); Anastasia Koretskaya (series 3); Suzanne Moisin (series 4); Igor Marin (series 4)
- Production locations: Saint Petersburg; Moscow; Crimea; Veliky Novgorod; Prague
- Cinematography: Maxim Shinkorenko
- Running time: 32–60 minutes
- Production companies: Production Value (season 1); Amedia (seas. 1–2); COSMOS Studio (seasons 2–4)

Original release
- Network: Russia
- Release: 24 November 2014 – 29 October 2023

Ekaterina is a 2014 Russia-1 historical television series starring Marina Aleksandrova as the eventual Russian empress Catherine the Great. The first season tells the story of princess Sophie Friederike Auguste, and her rise to power to become Empress of Russia, following a coup d'état and the assassination of her husband, Peter III. The second season portrays the challenges she faces at home and abroad during the early years of her rule, as she tries to revitalise Russia to become one of the great powers of Europe, and becomes titled "the Great".

The first season premiered on 24 November 2014 on Russia-1, and was released on Amazon in 2017 under the title Ekaterina: The Rise of Catherine the Great. The second season premiered on Russia-1 on 27 February 2017, and was released on Amazon in 2018. The third season premiered on 21 October 2019. The series premiered its fourth and final season on 5 October 2023.

== Plot summary ==
=== Season 1: Catherine (2014) ===
Motto – «I will reign… otherwise I will perish…»

1744. In Saint Petersburg, Empress Elizabeth is childless, and she appoints her nephew Peter Fedorovich as the heir to the Russian throne. But he had been born in Prussia and could hardly speak Russian.

Elizabeth decides to marry him to a princess, intending to take any future son and educate him to become the future emperor. Elizabeth chooses a wife for her nephew, German Princess Sophie Friederike Auguste von Anhalt-Zerbst-Dornburg. Sophia Frederike hopes to find happiness in the distant and foreign land, but she is faced with the intrigues and plots of the Russian Imperial court, the indifference of her husband, and the plans of the Empress. The girl takes the name Catherine Alexeevna (Yekaterina) and works to save herself and her children from danger, as the emperor Peter III desires to send her away from the palace.

In July 1762, barely six months after becoming emperor, Peter commits the political error of retiring with his Holstein-born courtiers and relatives to Oranienbaum, leaving his wife in Saint Petersburg. On 8 and 9 July the Leib Guard revolts, deposes Peter from power, and proclaims Catherine as the new monarch. The bloodless coup d'état succeeds and Catherine becomes the new empress, and thus the Golden Age of the Russian Empire begins.

=== Season 2: The Rise of Catherine (2017) ===
Motto – «She ascended the throne to become Great!»

1768. Catherine has ruled Russia for six years. A dangerous prospect of war with Turkey is looming. At the same time, Catherine is looking for a way to legally marry her longtime favorite Grigory Orlov and legitimize their common son Alexey, to make him heir to the throne in case Pavel Petrovich (the son of Catherine II and Peter III) remains childless.

However, Orlov's cheeky and unpredictable behavior, as well as his problems with male health, make the empress abandon her thought of marriage and send her son Alexey abroad. Having thrown Pavel Petrovich into the arms of her maid of honor, Sofia Stepanovna, the Empress makes sure that Pavel Petrovich can have children. Having got rid of Orlov, Catherine falls in love with the guard Grigory Potemkin and finds in Europe a bride for Pavel Petrovich, Wilhelmina Louisa of Hesse-Darmstadt.

1774. The Russo-Turkish War ends with a victory for Russia, which establishes its protectorate over the Crimean Khanate and gets access to the Black and Azov Seas.

1776. Pavel Petrovich marries for the second time to the Duchess Sophie Dorothea of Württemberg, while Catherine marries Potemkin, who in her honor establishes the city of Yekaterinoslav in the south of the empire.

1780. Catherine releases the Braunschweig family, children of the Duke Anton Ulrich – the great-grandchildren of Peter the Great's brother, from prison. They sail to Denmark.

1782. Catherine opens a statue of Peter the Great in Saint Petersburg and sends Pavel Petrovich with his wife and children on a trip to Europe.

=== Season 3: Impostors (2019) ===
Motto – «Russia is waiting… I won't let anyone stop me!»

Note: This season takes place between the 11th and 12th episode of the second season, from 1774 to 1776.

1774. The rule of the great and mighty Ekaterina is threatened. The Russo-Turkish War continues, draining the Empire's treasury. Numerous pretenders appear with claims to the throne. The Peasants' War is in full swing – a war led by Yemelyan Pugachev, who passed himself off as Peter III. Meanwhile, another pretender, Princess Tarakanova tries to pass herself off as a daughter of Empress Elizabeth and tries to claim the Russian throne. There is danger brewing inside the palace, too: the noblemen want to pass the throne on to her oldest son, Paul. Ekaterina's personal life is troubled. She has lost hope of having a child with Prince Potemkin. She has new love interests, new favorites. But the biggest and most important love of the Empress is Russia itself. Ekaterina has to make decisions that determine the fate of her throne and her empire.

=== Prequel: Elizabeth (2022) ===
The prequel tells the story of the Empress Elizabeth, daughter of Peter I, who was all but 16 years old, when her father died and left her to govern her immense empire. For Elizabeth, her throne became a living hell: against her will the young girl was pulled into court intrigues, where she is opposed by notable members of the court such as Andrei Ivanovich Osterman, Aleksandre Danielovich Meshikov, and even her own mother Catherine the First.

=== Season 4: Favorites (2023) ===
1779. Everyone already calls Empress Catherine II the Great at the instigation of her closest associate, the influential Princess Dashkova. His Serene Highness Prince Potemkin, the former favorite and married husband of Catherine, remains a faithful comrade-in-arms and, in fact, the second person in the state. The personal life of the Empress, as before, is full of passions and love affairs. However, despite everything, Catherine does not forget about important state affairs. Among them is a manifesto on succession to the throne. The Empress decides to transfer the throne to her grandson Alexander, bypassing the legal heir - her son Pavel. However, the Tsarevich is not going to give up his rights and will fight to the end. A new struggle for power begins.

== Cast ==
=== Catherine the Great ===
Ekaterina Alexeyevna / Sophie Friedericke Auguste, Princess of Anhalt-Zerbst-Dornburg
- Ekaterina character
- Portrayed by: Marina Alexandrova
- First appearance: Episode 1.01
- Last appearance: Episode 4.16
In-universe information
- Father: Christian August, Prince of Anhalt-Zerbst
- Mother: Johanna of Holstein-Gottorp
- Brothers: William Christian Frederick; Frederick Augustus, Prince of Anhalt-Zerbst
- Sisters: Auguste Christine Charlotte; Elizabeth Ulrike
- Husband: Peter III (m. 1745; died 1762) Grigory Potemkin (m. 1775)
- Sons: Pavel I Petrovich; Alexey Bobrinsky
- Daughters: Anna Petrovna
- Stepdaughters: Elizaveta Temkina
- Grandsons: Semyon Veliky; Alexander I
- Grandfathers: John Louis I of Anhalt-Dornburg; Christian August of Holstein-Gottorp, Prince of Eutin
- Grandmothers: Princess Christine Eleonore of Zeutsch; Albertina of Baden-Durlach
- Uncles: Adolf Frederick, King of Sweden; Frederick August I of Oldenburg; John Louis II of Anhalt-Zerbst
- First cousins: Gustav III of Sweden; Charles XIII of Sweden; Frederick Adolf of Östergötland; Sophia of Quedlinburg; Wilhelm of Oldenburg; Hedvig of Holstein-Gottorp

=== Main ===
- Marina Alexandrova as Princess Sophie of Anhalt-Zerbst / Her Highness Ekaterina Alekseyevna / Empress Catherine the Great
- Julia Aug as Empress Elizaveta Petrovna [series 1; 2–3 — flashbacks only]
- Aleksandr Yatsenko as His Highness Pyotr Fyodorovich / Emperor Peter III [series 1; 2–3 — flashbacks only]
- Pavel Tabakov as His Highness Pavel Petrovich [series 2–4]
- Vladimir Menshov as Count / Graf Alexey Bestuzhev-Ryumin [series 1]
- Konstantin Lavronenko as Count / Graf Johann Lestocq [series 1]
- Alexander Lazarev Jr. as Count / Graf Alexey Razumovsky [series 1]
- Nikolay Kozak as Count / Graf Alexander Shuvalov [series 1]
- Rinal Mukhametov as Count Sergey Saltykov [series 1; 2 – flashbacks only]
- Sergey Strelnikov as captain Grigory Orlov [series 1]
  - Sergey Marin as Count / Graf Grigory Orlov [series 2–3]
- Mikhail Gavrilov as Alexey Orlov [series 1]
  - Artyom Alekseev as Count / Graf Alexey Orlov [series 2–3]
- Kirill Rubtsov [series 1] / Igor Sklyar [series 2–3] as Ivan Betskoy
- Vladimir Yaglych as Grigory Potemkin [series 2–4]
- Sergey Koltakov as chancellor Nikita Panin [series 2–3]
- Mikhail Gorevoy as privy councillor Stepan Sheshkovsky [series 2–4]
- Stanislav Strelkov as cabinet secretary Adam Olsufyev [series 2–3]
- Alina Tomnikov as Princess Wilhelmina of Hesse-Darmstadt / Her Higness Natalya Alexeyevna [series 2–3]
- Artur Ivanov as Yemelyan Pugachev [series 3]
- Angelina Strechina as Princess Tarakanova [series 3]

=== Recurring cast ===
==== Season 1 ====
- Isabelle Schosing as Joanna Elisabeth of Holstein-Gottorp, mother of Catherine the Great
- Vitaly Kravchenko as Generalfeldmarschall Stepan Apraksin
- Elena Shamova as Gemma, a servant
- Ivan Dobronravov as Pimen, a servant / medicus
- Svetlana Korchagina as Matryona, a servant
- Alexey Vorobyov as Count Stanisław August Poniatowski [series 1]
  - Marcin Stec as King Stanisław August Poniatowski [series 2]:
    - Jacub Snochowski as Krzysztof Piecki, a valet of Stanisław Poniatowski [series 2]
- Maxim Kerin as Brockdorff, a valet of Peter III
- Hartmouth Krug [series 1] / Stass Klassen [series 2] as King Frederick II:
  - Yury Maslak as General Hans Joachim von Zieten
- Vitas Eisenach as Axel von Mardefeld, a Prussian ambassador
- Patrick Rouille Rollin as Marquis de La Chétardie, a French ambassador
- Pavel Vorozhtsov as Mikhail Lomonosov
- Polina Lazareva as Countess Yekaterina Vorontsova-Dashkova, a favorite of Peter III
- Valentina Talyzina as nursemaid of ex-emperor Ivan Antonovich
- Alexander Baluev as voice-off

==== Season 2 ====
- Lyubava Greshnova as lady-in-waiting Sophia Razumovskaya [series 2–3]
- Rodion Galyuchenko as Count Petr Razumovsky [series 2–3]
- Alexander Bulatov as Alexey Grigoryevich, son of Catherine the Great and Grigory Orlov [series 2; 3 (guest)]
- Anton Denisenko as Semyon Poroshin, a teacher of Pavel Petrovich [series 2; 3 — flashbacks only]
- Marina Mitrofanova as lady-in-waiting Anna Sheremeteva [series 2; 3 — flashbacks only]
- Igor Balalayev as Alexander Suvorov [series 2–3]
- George Devdariani as medicus George Rogerson (inspired by John Samuel Rogerson and Thomas Dimsdale)
- Alexander Tkachev as Count Andrey Razumovsky, a lover of Natalya Alexeyevna [series 2–3]
- Leonid Kulagin as archbishop Gavriil
- Alexandra Ursulyak as Darya Saltykova / Saltychikha
- Tatyana Lyalina as Princess Sophie Dorothea of Württemberg / Her Highness Maria Fyodorovna, 2nd wife of Pavel Petrovich [series 2; 4]
- Sergey Yushkevich as ambassador Count / Graf Alexey Obreskov
- Andrey Zaykov [series 2] / Alexander Nazarov [series 3] as Count / Graf Ivan Yelagin
- Alexander Smirnov as Grigory Teplov
- Andrey Gusev as Lev Naryshkin
- Alexander Oleshko as painter Fyodor Rokotov
- Vladimir Yumatov as Count / Graf Petr Sheremetev
- Sergey Larin as Nikolay Saltykov
- Andrey Rudensky as Duke Anthony Ulrich of Brunswick:
  - Anastasia Tsibizova as Catherine Antonovna of Brunswick
  - Kristina Boreyko as Elizabeth Antonovna of Brunswick
  - Alexey Khodokevich as Alexey Antonovich of Brunswick
  - Maxim Kudryavtsev as Peter Antonovich of Brunswick
- Alexey Usoltsev as Ivan Kulibin
- Samvel Muzhikyan as Sultan Mustafa III
- Sayat Abadzhyan as Ottoman ambassador Ćaner
- Ivan Agapov as medicus Pinkus
- Oleg Zima [series 2] / Igor Golovin [series 3] as Count / Graf Kirill Razumovsky
- Alena Olkina as Princess Amalie of Hesse-Darmstadt
- Elizaveta Arzamasova as Princess Louise of Hesse-Darmstadt
- Alexander Vorobyov as Vasily Shkurin, an educator of Alexey Grigoryevich
- Ola Keiro as Luka, a valet of Pavel Petrovich [series 2–3]
- Maxim Vazhov as Vlas, a servant of Nikita Panin [series 2–3]

==== Season 3 ====
- Danila Dunayev as poet Gavrila Derzhavin
- Diana Milyutina as Yekaterina Nelidova, a lady-in-waiting of Natalya Alexeyevna
- Igor Garbuzov as Lefebvre
- Artyom Kretov as Kazimierz Ogiński
- Daniil Slutsky as Michał Ogiński
- Olga Makeyeva as Maria Carolina of Austria
- Sergey Tessler as Ferdinand I of the Two Sicilies
- Kuzma Saprykin as playwright Denis Fonvizin
- Semyon Lopatin as Ivan Bludov
- Sergey Barkovsky as Count / Graf Petr Panin
- Sergey Goroshko as Anatole Gartenberg
- Monica Gossmann as Gertrude
- Vasilisa Izmaylova as Viola Yelagina
- Dmitry Giryov as Chumak
- Vladimir Antonik as voice-off

==== Season 4 ====
- Hugh McEnany as George III of Great Britain

== Episodes ==
=== Series overview ===
Series	Title	Episodes	Originally released	
Series	Title	Episodes	First released	Last released
1	Catherine	12	24 November 2014	27 November 2014
2	The Rise of Catherine	12	27 February 2017	7 March 2017
3	Impostors	16	21 October 2019	31 October 2019
4	Favorites	16	5 October 2023	29 October 2023

=== Season 1: Catherine (2014) ===
No. overall	No. in series	Title	Directed by	Written by	Original release date	Russia viewers (millions)
1	1	"Episode One"	Alexander Baranov	Arif Aliev	24 November 2014	N/A
2	2	"Episode Two"	Ramil Sabitov	Arif Aliev	24 November 2014	N/A
3	3	"Episode Three"	Alexander Baranov	Arif Aliev	24 November 2014	N/A
4	4	"Episode Four"	Ramil Sabitov	Arif Aliev	25 November 2014	N/A
5	5	"Episode Five"	Alexander Baranov	Arif Aliev	25 November 2014	N/A
6	6	"Episode Six"	Ramil Sabitov	Arif Aliev	25 November 2014	N/A
7	7	"Episode Seven"	Alexander Baranov	Arif Aliev	26 November 2014	N/A
8	8	"Episode Eight"	Ramil Sabitov	Arif Aliev	26 November 2014	N/A
9	9	"Episode Nine"	Alexander Baranov	Arif Aliev	26 November 2014	N/A
10	10	"Episode Ten"	Ramil Sabitov	Arif Aliev	27 November 2014	N/A
11	11	"Episode Eleven"	Alexander Baranov	Arif Aliev	27 November 2014	N/A
12	12	"Episode Twelve"	Ramil Sabitov	Arif Aliev	27 November 2014	N/A

=== Season 2: The Rise of Catherine (2017) ===
No. overall	No. in series	Title	Directed by	Written by	Original release date	Russia viewers (millions)
13	1	"Episode One"	Dmitry Iosifov	Arif Aliev	27 February 2017	6.7 / 18.1%
14	2	"Episode Two"	Dmitry Iosifov	Arif Aliev	27 February 2017	N/A
15	3	"Episode Three"	Dmitry Iosifov	Arif Aliev	28 February 2017	N/A
16	4	"Episode Four"	Dmitry Iosifov	Arif Aliev	28 February 2017	N/A
17	5	"Episode Five"	Dmitry Iosifov	Arif Aliev	1 March 2017	N/A
18	6	"Episode Six"	Dmitry Iosifov	Arif Aliev	1 March 2017	N/A
19	7	"Episode Seven"	Dmitry Iosifov	Arif Aliev	2 March 2017	N/A
20	8	"Episode Eight"	Dmitry Iosifov	Arif Aliev	2 March 2017	N/A
21	9	"Episode Nine"	Dmitry Iosifov	Arif Aliev	6 March 2017	N/A
22	10	"Episode Ten"	Dmitry Iosifov	Arif Aliev	6 March 2017	N/A
23	11	"Episode Eleven"	Dmitry Iosifov	Arif Aliev	7 March 2017	N/A
24	12	"Episode Twelve"	Dmitry Iosifov	Arif Aliev	7 March 2017	6.4 / 19.9%

=== Season 3: Impostors (2019) ===
No. overall	No. in series	Title	Directed by	Written by	Original release date	Russia viewers (millions)
25	1	"Episode One"	Dmitry Iosifov	Arif Aliev	21 October 2019	4.4 / 13.8%
26	2	"Episode Two"	Dmitry Iosifov	Arif Aliev & Andrey Ivanov	21 October 2019	N/A
27	3	"Episode Three"	Dmitry Iosifov	Arif Aliev	22 October 2019	N/A
28	4	"Episode Four"	Dmitry Iosifov	Arif Aliev & Ivan Zaruvaev	22 October 2019	N/A
29	5	"Episode Five"	Dmitry Iosifov	Arif Aliev	23 October 2019	N/A
30	6	"Episode Six"	Dmitry Iosifov	Arif Aliev & Andrey Ivanov	23 October 2019	N/A
31	7	"Episode Seven"	Dmitry Iosifov	Arif Aliev	24 October 2019	N/A
32	8	"Episode Eight"	Dmitry Iosifov	Arif Aliev & Ivan Zaruvaev	24 October 2019	N/A
33	9	"Episode Nine"	Dmitry Iosifov	Arif Aliev	28 October 2019	N/A
34	10	"Episode Ten"	Dmitry Iosifov	Arif Aliev & Andrey Ivanov	28 October 2019	N/A
35	11	"Episode Eleven"	Dmitry Iosifov	Arif Aliev	29 October 2019	4.1 / 13.1%
36	12	"Episode Twelve"	Dmitry Iosifov	Arif Aliev & Ivan Zaruvaev	29 October 2019	N/A
37	13	"Episode Thirteen"	Dmitry Iosifov	Arif Aliev	30 October 2019	N/A
38	14	"Episode Fourteen"	Dmitry Iosifov	Arif Aliev & Andrey Ivanov	30 October 2019	N/A
39	15	"Episode Fifteen"	Dmitry Iosifov	Arif Aliev	31 October 2019	N/A
40	16	"Episode Sixteen"	Dmitry Iosifov	Arif Aliev & Ivan Zaruvaev	31 October 2019	N/A

=== Season 4: Favorites (2023) ===
No. overall	No. in series	Title	Directed by	Written by	Original release date	Russia viewers (millions)
41	1	"Episode One"	Unknown	Unknown	5 October 2023	N/A
42	2	"Episode Two"	Unknown	Unknown	5 October 2023	N/A
43	3	"Episode Three"	Unknown	Unknown	5 October 2023	N/A
44	4	"Episode Four"	Unknown	Unknown	5 October 2023	N/A
45	5	"Episode Five"	Unknown	Unknown	12 October 2023	N/A
46	6	"Episode Six"	Unknown	Unknown	12 October 2023	N/A
47	7	"Episode Seven"	Unknown	Unknown	12 October 2023	N/A
48	8	"Episode Eight"	Unknown	Unknown	12 October 2023	N/A
49	9	"Episode Nine"	Unknown	Unknown	19 October 2023	N/A
50	10	"Episode Ten"	Unknown	Unknown	19 October 2023	N/A
51	11	"Episode Eleven"	Unknown	Unknown	19 October 2023	N/A
52	12	"Episode Twelve"	Unknown	Unknown	19 October 2023	N/A
53	13	"Episode Thirteen"	Unknown	Unknown	26 October 2023	N/A
54	14	"Episode Fourteen"	Unknown	Unknown	27 October 2023	N/A
55	15	"Episode Fifteen"	Unknown	Unknown	28 October 2023	N/A
56	16	"Episode Sixteen"	Unknown	Unknown	29 October 2023	N/A

== Reception ==
The series has received praise for its acting and costume design, and the first season won Russia's Golden Eagle award for "best television series". A review at Eclectic Pop described it as "a vivid and beautifully crafted series replete with lavish costumes and a stirring musical score". Writing for BroadwayWorld, Robert Kahn described the series as "gloriously filmed" and added: "The story of Catherine's rise to power rivals any contemporary soap opera, as an intricate web of politics, adultery and betrayal unfolds within the Russian court in spectacular fashion."

During the broadcast, the series held the top spot for film and television series ratings in Russia, and became one of the most popular TV series in the Russian Federation.

== Release ==
Season one, with English subtitles and reformatted into ten episodes, was released by Amazon Prime in June 2017. This drama also aired in Pakistan on LTN Family, dubbed in Urdu. The drama also aired in Korea. Season 1 began airing on STB (Sangsaeng Television Broadcasting) on June 21, 2019, and was also broadcast on the cable channel WeLike. It is available to stream on Watcha and Wavve. Season 4 aired in June 2025.

== See also ==
- Catherine the Great, Channel One Russia's version
- Catherine the Great, HBO's miniseries version
