= 1741 in Russia =

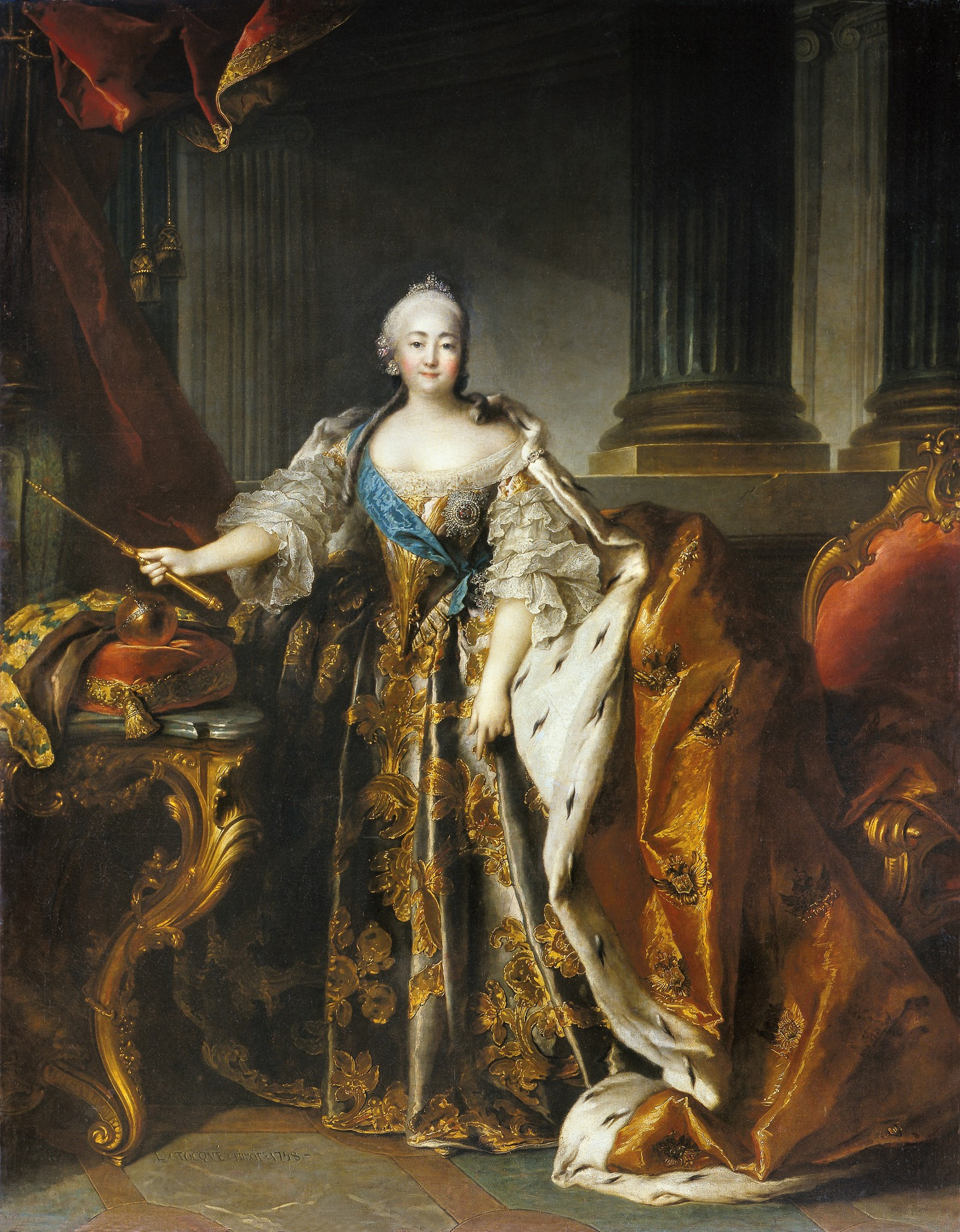
Carle Vanloo, Portrait of Empress Elizabeth Petrovna (1760), who seized the throne in 1741

Events from the year 1741 in Russia were dominated by a dramatic change in leadership, as Elizabeth Petrovna deposed the infant Emperor Ivan VI and his regent, Anna Leopoldovna, in a bloodless palace coup, and by the outbreak of the Russo-Swedish War (1741–1743).

== Incumbents ==
- Monarch – Ivan VI (until 6 December 1741)
- Regent – Grand Duchess Anna Leopoldovna (until 6 December 1741)
- Monarch – Elizabeth Petrovna (from 6 December 1741)

== Events ==
- Late July – France-backed Sweden declares war on Russia, initiating the Russo-Swedish War (1741–1743), aiming to recover territories lost in the Great Northern War.
- 8 August – Sweden formally declares war on Russia following the murder of Swedish diplomatic courier Malcolm Sinclair.
- 23 August – At the Battle of Villmanstrand, Russian forces under Field Marshal Peter von Lacy defeat the Swedish army at present-day Lappeenranta, Finland.
- 6 December (N.S.) / 25 November (O.S.) – Elizabeth Petrovna stages a bloodless coup with the Preobrazhensky Regiment, deposes Ivan VI and Anna Leopoldovna, and is proclaimed Empress of Russia.
- 12 December – The deposed regent Anna Leopoldovna, her husband Anthony Ulrich, and their children are imprisoned, initially at Riga and later at Dünamünde fortress.

== Births ==
- Pyotr Melissino (c. 1726–1797), Greek-born Russian General of the Artillery.
- Catherine Antonovna of Brunswick (15 July 1741–1807), daughter of Anthony Ulrich and Anna Leopoldovna.

== Deaths ==
- 8 December – Vitus Bering, Danish-born explorer; died on Bering Island after his ship was wrecked. Modern research suggests he died of heart failure rather than scurvy.
