= Catherine the Great (miniseries) =

Miniseries about Empress Catherine II of Russia

- Promotional poster
- Genre: Drama
- Written by: Nigel Williams
- Directed by: Philip Martin
- Starring: Helen Mirren; Jason Clarke; Rory Kinnear; Gina McKee; Kevin R. McNally; Richard Roxburgh; Joseph Quinn; Clive Russell; Paul Kaye; Paul Ritter
- Composer: Rupert Gregson-Williams
- Countries of origin: United Kingdom; United States
- Original language: English
- No. of episodes: 4

Production
- Executive producers: David M. Thompson; Charlie Pattinson; Philip Martin; Nigel Williams; Helen Mirren
- Producer: Jules Hussey
- Production locations: Lithuania; Latvia; Russia
- Cinematography: Stuart Howell
- Editors: Stuart Gazzard; Selina MacArthur
- Running time: 60 minutes
- Production companies: New Pictures; Origin Pictures; Sky Studios

Original release
- Network: Sky Atlantic (UK); HBO (US)
- Release: October 3, 2019

Catherine the Great is a British-American television miniseries written by Nigel Williams and directed by Philip Martin for Sky Atlantic and HBO Miniseries. It stars Helen Mirren as the titular Catherine the Great.

The series premiered in its entirety on 3 October 2019 on Sky Atlantic in the United Kingdom. It debuted on 21 October 2019 on HBO in the United States. The show was also distributed worldwide by Sky Vision.

== Plot ==
The miniseries depicts Empress Catherine II of Russia's reign, from 1764, two years after taking power, until her death in 1796.

== Cast and characters ==
=== Starring ===
- Helen Mirren as Catherine the Great, the Empress of Russia
- Jason Clarke as Grigory Potemkin, a military commander and Catherine's lover
- Rory Kinnear as Nikita Ivanovich Panin, Catherine's foreign minister
- Gina McKee as Countess Praskovya Bruce, a lifelong friend and confidante of Catherine's
- Kevin R. McNally as Alexei Orlov, a Russian statesman and later Catherine's Minister of War
- Richard Roxburgh as Grigory Orlov, a former lover of Catherine's who orchestrated the coup d'état that allowed her to gain power
- Joseph Quinn as Paul Petrovich, Tsarevich of Russia, Catherine's son
- Clive Russell as the Fool
- Paul Kaye as Yemelyan Pugachev, a Yaik Cossack who instigates a popular revolt against Catherine
- Paul Ritter as Alexander Suvorov

=== Recurring ===
- Thomas Doherty as Pyotr Zavadovsky, Catherine's (private) secretary and lover
- Iain Mitchell as Archbishop Arsenius, metropolitan of Rostov and Yaroslavl
- Georgina Beedle as Natalia Alexeievna, Paul's first wife
- John Hodgkinson as Pyotr Rumyantsev
- Phil Dunster as Andrey Razumovsky, Natalia's lover
- James Northcote as Alexander Bezborodko, Catherine's secretary and assistant
- Antonia Clarke as Maria Fedorovna, Paul's second wife
- Adam El Hagar as Valerian Zubov, Catherine's aide-de-camp and Platon Zubov's brother

=== Guest ===
- Lucas Englander as Vasily Mirovich, a Lieutenant of the Smolensk Regiment
- Simon Thorp as Captain Danilo Vlasev, a guard at Shlisselburg Fortress
- Ellis Howard as Ivan VI of Russia, the deposed Emperor of Russia incarcerated at Shlisselburg Fortress
- Sam Palladio as Alexander Vasilchikov, one of Catherine's lovers
- Andrew Rothney as Alexander Dmitriev-Mamonov, one of Catherine's lovers
- Aina Norgilaite as Elena
- Andrew Bone as Charles-Joseph de Ligne, a Field Marshal and a diplomat in service of the Archduchy of Austria
- Raphael Acloque as Platon Zubov, one of Catherine's lovers
- Felix Jamieson as Alexander, Catherine's grandson and future Emperor

== Filming locations ==
The majority of filming took place in Lithuania, due to scenery of the country and favourable film tax incentives - Vilnius, Pažaislis monastery and Trakai Island Castle. A large part of filming, in particular the episodes happening in the throne room, many corridor episodes, the cross-dressing ball at the end of Episode 1, and the scenes that take place on the stairs outside the palace, were filmed in Rundāle Palace in Latvia. Other scenes were filmed in St Petersburg, Peterhof Palace, and Catherine Palace in Tsarskoye Selo Russia.

== Episodes ==
No.	Title	Directed by	Written by	Original release date	U.K./U.S. viewers (millions)
1	"Episode 1"	Phillip Martin	Nigel Williams	3 October 2019	0.345/0.332
Catherine the Great visits Ivan VI of Russia in the Shlisselburg prison. Catherine won't marry the military officer Grigory Orlov. She is suspicious of Mirovich.
2	"Episode 2"	Phillip Martin	Nigel Williams	3 October 2019	0.345/0.232
Rumyantsev and Potemkin are spearheading the Russo-Turkish War (1768–1774). Natalia of the House of Hesse-Darmstadt becomes Catherine's daughter-in-law. However, Natalia publicly has amorous relations with Razumovsky. Catherine manages the Preobrazhensky Guards. Potemkin puts down Pugachev's Rebellion.
3	"Episode 3"	Phillip Martin	Nigel Williams	3 October 2019	0.345/0.311
Potemkin blows a fuse that Catherine has a romantic relationship with Peter Zavadovsky. Catherine has forged an alliance with Frederick II of Prussia to facilitate the takeover of Crimean Khanate from the Ottoman Empire. Afterwards, Potemkin takes Catherine to see his Black Sea Fleet around Sevastopol, Crimea. Potemkin aspires to push farther into Byzantium, the capital of the Ottoman Empire and, previously, the Eastern Roman Empire.
4	"Episode 4"	Phillip Martin	Nigel Williams	3 October 2019	0.345/0.237
Russia declares war on the Ottoman Empire (Russo-Turkish War (1787–1792)) after Turkish officials imprison the Russian Ambassador in Constantinople. Potemkin gets angry when Catherine decides to recall Alexei Orlov back to court to help strategize for the war. The Russians proceed to take Ochakov. Paul accuses his mother of "poisoning" his son Alexander against him.

== Release ==
The four-part miniseries premiered in its entirety on Sky Atlantic, On Demand and Now TV in the United Kingdom on 3 October 2019. It debuted in its entirety on HBO Go and HBO Now in the United States on 21 October 2019, while HBO broadcast one part per week until 11 November 2019. Catherine the Great premiered on Fox Showcase in Australia on 3 November 2019.

== Reception ==
On review aggregator Rotten Tomatoes, the film holds an approval rating of 68% based on 40 reviews, with an average rating of 6.9/10. The website's critics consensus reads, "Though its sumptuous setting and design often outshines its storytelling, Catherine the Great remains a seductive, if scattershot, period drama thanks to the great Helen Mirren". On Metacritic, the series has a weighted average score of 61 out of 100, based on 18 critics, indicating "generally favorable reviews".

The Guardian, while praising Helen Mirren's performance, found the work, overall, lacked the necessary "magic touch".

Variety wrote: "Stepping back from the series' four episodes reveals a disappointing lack of ambition in portraying such a titanic force's final days".

Mike Hale of The New York Times criticized the film for having "a lot of yelling and passionate making up", and called it "a little distant and slightly embarrassing", comparing it to "a couple you don't know arguing in a parking lot".

Brian Lowry of CNN wrote "The peccadilloes of royalty never go out of fashion, but Catherine -- with her tumultuous decades-long reign -- brings more intrigue to the party than most".

Vanity Fair's Sonia Saraiya said that "Catherine the Great reframes her desire as part of her glory - and revels in that glory, without asking too many awkward questions".

According to David Fear of the Rolling Stone, "You can feel that [directors] are relying on the mighty Dame Helen to do most of the dramatic heavy lifting here. You can also sense when, despite her best efforts, that particular plan of action still falls short".

== Accolades ==
Year	Award	Category	Nominee(s)	Result	Ref.
2020	British Academy Television Awards	Best Make Up & Hair Design	Kirstin Chalmers	Nominated	
2020	British Academy Television Awards	Best Titles & Graphic Identity	Elastic	Nominated	
2020	Golden Globe Awards	Best Actress – Limited Series or Television Film	Helen Mirren	Nominated	
2020	Primetime Emmy Awards	Outstanding Sound Editing for a Limited Series, Movie or Special	Jim Goddard, Craig Butters, Duncan Price, Matthew Mewett, Andrew Glen, Anna Wright and Catherine Thomas (for "Episode 4")	Nominated	
2020	Satellite Awards	Best Actress in a Miniseries or TV Film	Helen Mirren	Nominated	

== Bibliography ==
- Mangan, Lucy (3 October 2019). "Catherine the Great review – Mirren's labour of love needs magic touch". The Guardian.
