= Antonovna =

Antonovna is a Russian patronymic from the given name Anton. Notable people identified by this patronymic include:

- Catherine Antonovna of Brunswick (1741–1807), Russian nobility
- Elizabeth Antonovna of Brunswick (1743–1782), Russian nobility
