= Julia von Mengden =

Livonian noblewoman of German descent, lady in waiting and favourite

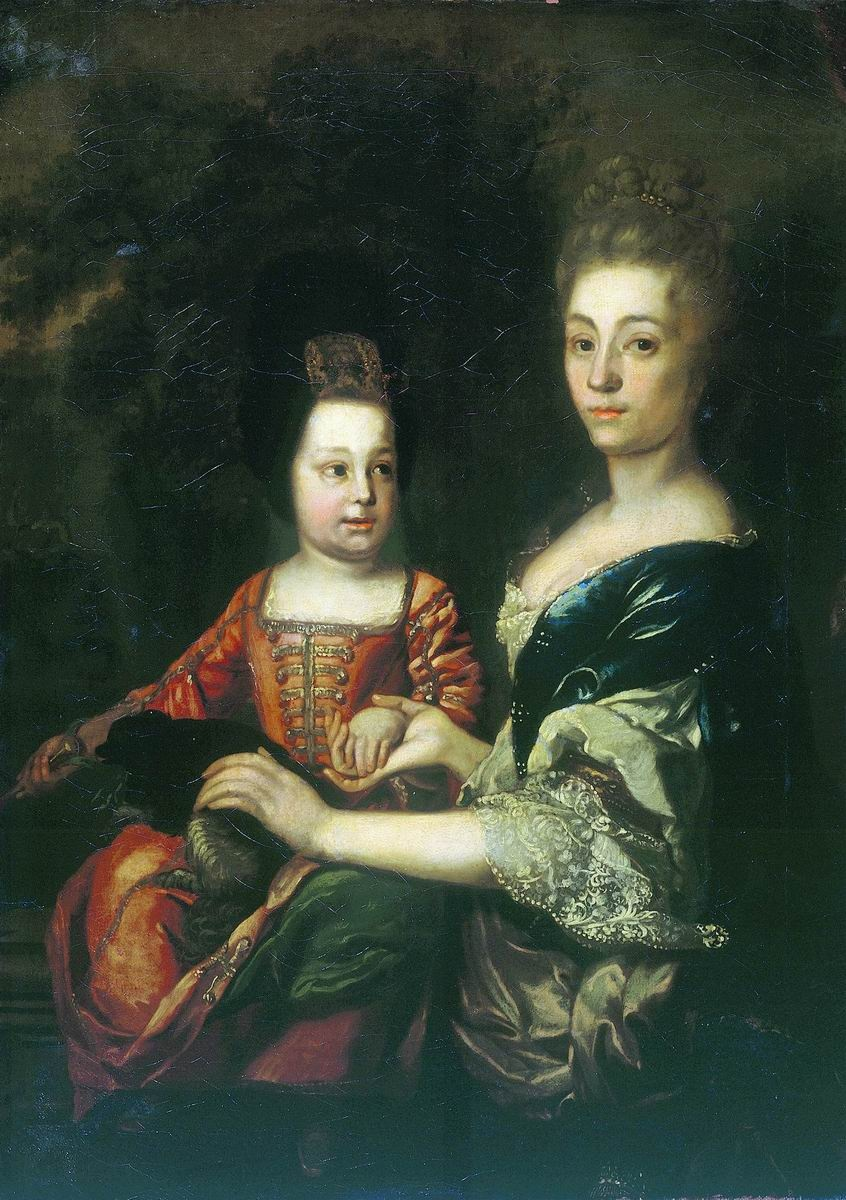
Portrait by an unknown painter, late 18th century

Baroness Augusta Juliane "Julia" von Mengden (1719–1786) was a Livonian noblewoman of German descent, lady in waiting, favourite, an intimate friend and a confidante of the Russian regent Grand Duchess Anna Leopoldovna.

== Biography ==
Baroness Augusta Juliane was the daughter of the Livonian Baron Magnus Gustav von Mengden (1663–1726) and his third wife, Dorothea Sophie von Rosen (1690–1773). She participated in the coup that placed Grand Duchess Anna Leopoldovna in power 1740 and was named the official nurse of Ivan VI of Russia. She followed Anna Leopoldovna to her prison in Riga in 1741, but was then separated from her and imprisoned in Ranenburg. She was released by Catherine the Great in 1762.

== Sources ==
- "Менгден, Юлиана Магнусовна" . Brockhaus and Efron Encyclopedic Dictionary (in Russian). 1906.
