= Catherine of Brunswick-Wolfenbüttel =

Catherine of Brunswick-Wolfenbüttel may refer to:

- Catherine of Brunswick-Wolfenbüttel, Duchess of Saxe-Lauenburg (1488–1563), daughter of Henry IV, Duke of Brunswick-Lüneburg, wife of Magnus I, Duke of Saxe-Lauenburg
- Catherine of Brunswick-Wolfenbüttel, Margravine of Brandenburg-Küstrin (1518–1574), daughter of Henry V, Duke of Brunswick-Lüneburg, wife of Margrave John of Brandenburg-Küstrin

== See also ==
- Catherine of Brunswick (disambiguation)
