= Anthony Ulrich =

Anthony Ulrich may refer to:

- Anthony Ulrich, Duke of Brunswick (1633–1714)
- Duke Anthony Ulrich of Brunswick (1714–1776)
