= Catherine of Brunswick =

Catherine of Brunswick may refer to:

- Catherine of Anhalt-Bernburg (1330–1390), daughter of Bernhard III, Prince of Anhalt-Bernburg; wife and duchess of Magnus II, Duke of Brunswick-Lüneburg and later Albert of Saxe-Wittenberg, Duke of Lüneburg
- Catherine Elisabeth of Brunswick-Lüneburg (1385–after 1423), daughter of Magnus II, Duke of Brunswick-Lüneburg, wife of Gerhard VI, Count of Holstein
- Catherine of Brunswick (d. 1439), daughter of Frederick I, Duke of Brunswick-Lüneburg, wife of Henry XIX (XXIV) of Schwarzburg-Blankenburg
- Catherine of Brunswick-Lüneburg (1395–1442), daughter of Henry the Mild, Duke of Brunswick-Lüneburg, wife of Frederick I, Elector of Saxony
- Catherine of Pomerania, Duchess of Brunswick-Lüneburg (1465–1526), daughter of Eric II, Duke of Pomerania-Wolgast; wife and duchess of Henry IV, Duke of Brunswick-Lüneburg
- Catherine of Brunswick-Wolfenbüttel, Duchess of Saxe-Lauenburg (1488–1563), daughter of Henry IV, Duke of Brunswick-Lüneburg, wife of Magnus I, Duke of Saxe-Lauenburg
- Catherine of Brunswick-Wolfenbüttel, Margravine of Brandenburg-Küstrin (1518–1574), daughter of Henry V, Duke of Brunswick-Lüneburg, wife of John, Margrave of Brandenburg-Küstrin
- Catherine Antonovna of Brunswick (1741–1807), daughter of Duke Anthony Ulrich of Brunswick, imprisoned by Empress Elizabeth of Russia along with her family for her entire life.
