= Elizabeth Antonovna of Brunswick =

Russian noble

Elizabeth Antonovna
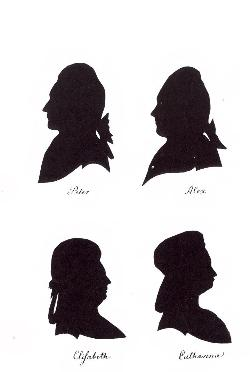
- Silhouettes of Elizabeth and her siblings at Horsens
- Born: 16 November 1743
- Died: 20 October 1782 (aged 38); Horsens
Names
- Elizabeth Antonovna
- House: House of Mecklenburg-Brunswick-Romanov
- Father: Duke Anthony Ulrich of Brunswick
- Mother: Grand Duchess Anna Leopoldovna of Russia

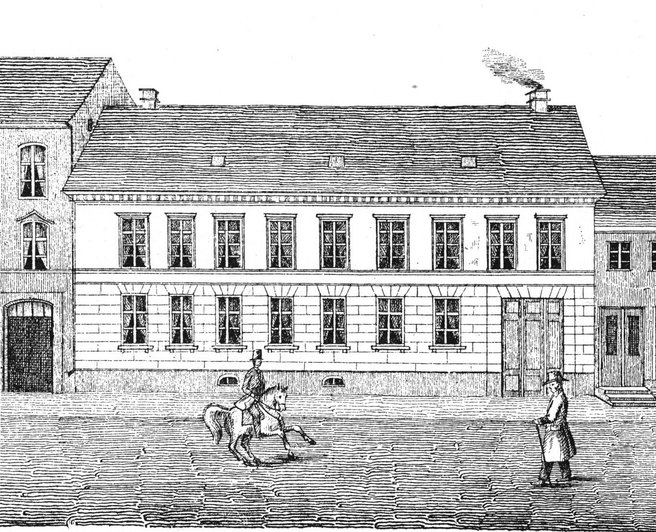
Russian Palace of Horsens

Elizabeth Antonovna of Brunswick-Lüneburg (1743–1782) was the daughter of Duke Anthony Ulrich of Brunswick and Grand Duchess Anna Leopoldovna of Russia. Born after the deposition of her brother Ivan VI, she was kept imprisoned by Empress Elizabeth of Russia along with her family at Kholmogory, and in 1780, she and two brothers and a sister were placed under house arrest for the rest of their lives in Horsens.

== Early life ==
The siblings were kept prisoner because their right to the Russian throne, according to the succession of Empress Anna, made them potential political threats to the Empress Elizabeth, Emperor Peter III, and eventually Empress Catherine the Great. In contrast to that of their elder brother, the deposed Ivan VI, who was placed in solitary confinement, the younger siblings were kept together with their father after the death of their mother in 1746.

In Kholmogory, the family occupied the Bishop's house within the fortress compound, where they were allowed a small garden and some animals. They were kept under watch by guards and kept a small retinue of servants: as their father retained sexual relations with the female servants, their staff eventually consisted of their half siblings.

By an Imperial decree of 1750, the siblings were banned from learning to read and write.

== Reign of Catherine the Great ==
In 1766, their father was offered his freedom by Empress Catherine the Great, but he refused to leave without his children, and therefore remained with them until his death in 1774, by then blind.

In 1780, Empress Catherine was arranging for their release and transfer to the custody of their paternal aunt, the Danish queen dowager Juliana Maria of Brunswick-Wolfenbüttel in Denmark. Before their release, they were brought to Arkhangelsk to be interviewed and inspected by Governor Aleksei Melgunov. Melgunov provided personal descriptions of each sibling in his report.

He reported that all the four siblings were physically weak and suffered from poor health; Peter was lopsided and bow-legged and seemed consumptive; Aleksei was physically stronger but suffered from seizures; Catherine was thin and deaf and suffered from seizures, could lipread but had poor control over her voice. As for Elizabeth, she was described as plump, energetic, talkative and reliable, and also as the dominant personality and as the spokesperson of the family. While being physically weak, however, all four siblings were described as intelligent, likable and humane people, who had learned to read and write on their own despite the prohibition of the Imperial decree. They had reportedly a friendly relationship to each other, spending their days tending to the garden and their hens and ducks, riding, chasing each other on the frozen lake at winter, and playing chess and cards.

Kovrov city council member Nikolay Frolov wrote that Elizabeth likely had a son with a guard sergeant named Ivan Trifonov. Natan Eidelman writes that they at least were lovers.

During the inspection of Melgonov, Elizabeth, described as the head of the family, communicated the siblings' life and wishes. She stated that when young, before their father had grown blind, they had all wished to be free, and hoped for the day when they would be released. They had asked for permission to ride a sleigh through the streets, but never received a reply to any demand made. As for herself personally, she had wished to be educated about the manners of the grand world and participate in high society. Now, however, they had lived all their lives as prisoners and had grown to be content with their lives. They had only three wishes: first, that they wished to be allowed to visit a meadow, as they had heard that it contained flowers not to be found in their garden; second, that the wives of the officers should be allowed to visit them to provide company; and finally, they wished to learn how to be put on and wear the complicated upper-class garments they were provided with, such as the corsets, because neither they nor their servants knew how they should be put on or worn. If these three wishes were granted, she stated, they would all four be content to continue to live as before.

== Later life ==
Before their release, the siblings were provided with new wardrobes and household gifts from the Empress, so that Russia would make a good impression in Denmark. When told that they would be transferred to Denmark, they asked that they be housed in a remote place with few people there. While leaving Russia on ship on the 27 June 1780, the siblings reportedly started to cry upon seeing the fortress in Arkhangelsk, believing that they had been tricked and would be separated and each placed in solitary confinement.

On 30 August 1780, the siblings arrived in Denmark. Because of bureaucratic reasons, however, they were forced to separate from their servants (and half siblings) upon their arrival. In Denmark, their aunt, Queen Dowager Juliana Maria, reportedly never visited them even once. They lived under house arrest in Horsens in Jutland under the guardianship of Juliana Maria and at the expense of Empress Catherine. Although they were prisoners, they lived in relative comfort and retained a small "court" of between 40 and 50 people, all Danish except for their Russian Orthodox priest. The siblings, being unused to their new degree of freedom in a new environment and surrounded by people whose language they could not understand, were reportedly unhappy in Denmark.
