= Alexei Antonovich of Brunswick =

Russian royal (1746–1787)

Alexei Antonovich
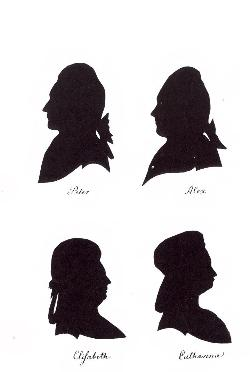
- Silhouettes of Alexei and his siblings at Horsens
- Born: 27 February 1746; Kholmogory
- Died: 21 October 1787 (aged 41); Horsens
- Alexei Antonovich
- House: House of Mecklenburg-Brunswick-Romanov
- Father: Duke Anthony Ulrich of Brunswick
- Mother: Grand Duchess Anna Leopoldovna of Russia

Alexei Antonovich of Brunswick-Lüneburg (27 February 1746 – 12 (23) October 1787), was the third son of Duke Anthony Ulrich of Brunswick and Grand Duchess Anna Leopoldovna of Russia, and younger brother of Ivan VI.

The siblings were kept prisoner because their right to the Russian throne, according to the succession of Empress Anna, made them potential political threats to the Empress Elizabeth, Emperor Peter III, and eventually Empress Catherine the Great. In contrast to that of their elder brother, the deposed Ivan VI, who was placed in solitary confinement, the younger siblings were kept together with their father after the death of their mother in 1746. In Kholmogory, the family occupied the Bishop's house within the fortress compound, where they were allowed small garden and some animals. They were kept under watch by guards and kept a small retinue of servants: as their father retained sexual relations with the female servants, their staff eventually consisted of their half siblings. By an Imperial decree of 1750, the siblings were banned from learning to read and write.

In 1766, their father was offered his freedom by Empress Catherine the Great, but he refused to leave without his children, and therefore remained with them until his death in 1774, by then blind. In 1780, Empress Catherine was arranging for their release and transfer to the custody of their paternal aunt, the Danish queen dowager Juliana Maria of Brunswick-Wolfenbüttel in Denmark. Before their release, they were brought to Archangelsk to be interviewed and inspected by Governor Aleksei Melgunov. Melgunov provided personal descriptions of each sibling in his report. He reported that all the four siblings were physically weak and suffered from poor health; Peter was lopsided and bow-legged and seemed consumptive; Aleksei was physically stronger but suffered from seizures; Catherine was thin and deaf and suffered from seizures, could lipread but had poor control over her voice. As for Elizabeth, she was described as plump, energetic, talkative and reliable, and also as the dominant personality and as the spokesperson of the family. While being physically weak, however, all four siblings were described as intelligent, likable and humane people, who had learned to read and write on their own despite the prohibition of the Imperial decree. They reportedly had a friendly relationship with each other, spending their days tending to the garden and their hens and ducks, riding, chasing each other on the frozen lake at winter, and playing chess and cards.

Before their release, the siblings were provided with new wardrobes and household gifts from the Empress, so that Russia would make a good impression in Denmark. When told that they would be transferred to Denmark, they asked that they be housed in a remote place with few people there. While leaving Russia by ship on the 27 June 1780, the siblings reportedly started to cry upon seeing the fortress in Arhangelsk, believing that they had been tricked and would be separated and each placed in solitary confinement. On 30 August 1780, the siblings arrived in Denmark. Because of bureaucratic reasons, however, they were forced to separate from their servants (and half siblings) upon their arrival. In Denmark, their aunt, Queen Dowager Juliana Maria of Brunswick-Wolfenbüttel, reportedly never visited them even once. They lived under house arrest in Horsens in Jutland under the guardianship of Juliana Maria and at the expense of Empress Catherine. Although they were prisoners, they lived in relative comfort and retained a small "court" of between 40 and 50 people, all Danish except their Russian Orthodox priest. The siblings, being unused to their new degree of freedom in a new environment and surrounded by people whose language they could not understand, were reportedly unhappy in Denmark.
