= Vasily Mirovich =

Little Russian lieutenant and failed liberator of Ivan VI

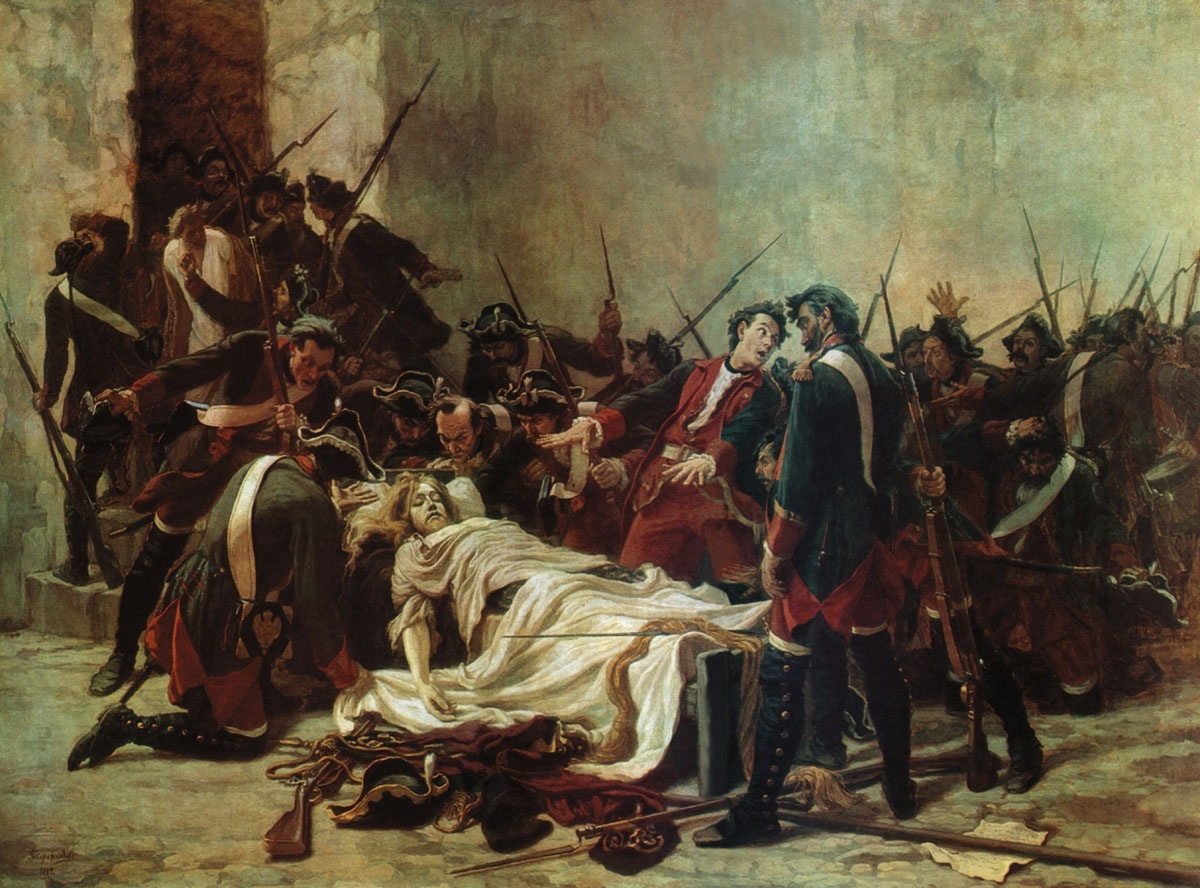
- Mirovich Standing over the Corpse of Ivan VI by Ivan Tvorozhnikov, 1884
- Born: Vasily Yakovlevich Mirovich; Unknown date, c. 1740; Tobolsk, Siberia Governorate
- Died: 15 September 1764 (aged 24); Saint Petersburg, Russian Empire
- Military career
- Branch: Imperial Russian Army
- Rank: Second lieutenant
- Unit: 25th Smolensk Infantry Regiment
- Wars: Seven Years' War

Vasily Yakovlevich Mirovich (Russian: Васи́лий Я́ковлевич Миро́вич; c. 1740 – 15 September 1764) was a Little Russian (Ukrainian) lieutenant in the Imperial Russian Army's 25th Smolensk Infantry Regiment best known for his attempted but ultimately unsuccessful rescue of Ivan VI of Russia at Shlisselburg Fortress during the reign of Catherine the Great. Ivan VI had been Emperor of Russia for less than a year as an infant in 1740–1741, until he and his family were deposed and imprisoned by Elizabeth of Russia. The attempted rescue ended with Ivan VI's murder by his two permanent prison guards, who were under strict and secret orders by the empress and her successors to kill their prisoner in such an event.

== Early life ==
Vasily Mirovich was born around 1740. Not much is known about his life until his attempted rescue of Ivan VI of Russia, except the fact that he was of aristocratic Ukrainian origin. His family's estates had been confiscated in 1709 by Peter the Great because his grandfather had sided with Ivan Mazepa against the tsar during the Swedish invasion of Russia. Mirovich grew up in poverty as a result of this, and was deprived of most of his family heritage, he petitioned the senate in hopes of recovering his family's lands twice and was refused both times. He approached Kirill Razumovski, Hetman of the Zaporizhian Host, but was told that his claims were hopeless. Razumovski said to Mirovich: "Make your own career, young man. Seize fortune by the forelock as others have done." Mirovich would remember these words for the rest of his life.

== Attempted rescue of Ivan VI ==
Mirovich was later assigned as a lieutenant to Shlisselburg Fortress, the fortress in which Ivan VI of Russia was jailed. Mirovich soon began to realize the identity of the prisoner whose name was withheld from the prison staff, and he determined himself to be his rescuer. Mirovich's original intentions for doing so were to bring about his own fame for rescuing the true tsar, so that he could enjoy a better life. However, he also became religiously motivated, placing upon himself the Christian duty of removing one whom he considered to be a usurper in favor of the rightful tsar. He did not realize that there was a secret order in place to kill Ivan VI if his rescue should be at hand.

He found an accomplice by the name of Appolon Ushakov in early May 1764. Their plan consisted of having Ushakov come in to the fortress by boat with a fake decree from the Empress ordering the liberation of Ivan VI. They would then arrest the prison commandant and transport Ivan VI to Saint Petersburg by way of the Neva. There, they would announce Ivan VI to the troops. The coup did not go according to plan when Ushakov was suddenly assigned to accompany a convoy to Smolensk. Ushakov, by a real or feigned illness, however, took leave of the convoy and turned towards the capital. He did not make it back, however, and drowned on his way.

Mirovich, after looking unsuccessfully for new accomplices, decided to complete the coup alone. He wrote a manifesto declaring Ivan's right to the throne, and on 5 July, at around 02:00, he called the men under his command to arms and began his attempt to free Ivan VI. After Mirovich seized the main gates, the commandant was called out to see what was happening, and was clubbed unconscious by Mirovich. Gunfire was exchanged between Mirovich's men and Ivan's guards, which ended in a ceasefire agreed to by the guards. However, when Mirovich reached Ivan's casemate, he found that he had already been slain by the guards in charge of executing the Empress' secret order. Upon this, Mirovich surrendered.

== Execution ==
An investigation took place lasting many weeks, during which Mirovich refused to name accomplices. Though enraged, Catherine deferred the judgment to the majority vote of the court, and chose not to push for violent punishment and even denied a court member's suggestion of torture. Mirovich was decapitated on 15 September, and many other involved soldiers were sentenced to beatings and exile.
