= Anna Leopoldovna =

Regent of Russia

Grand Duchess Anna Leopoldovna
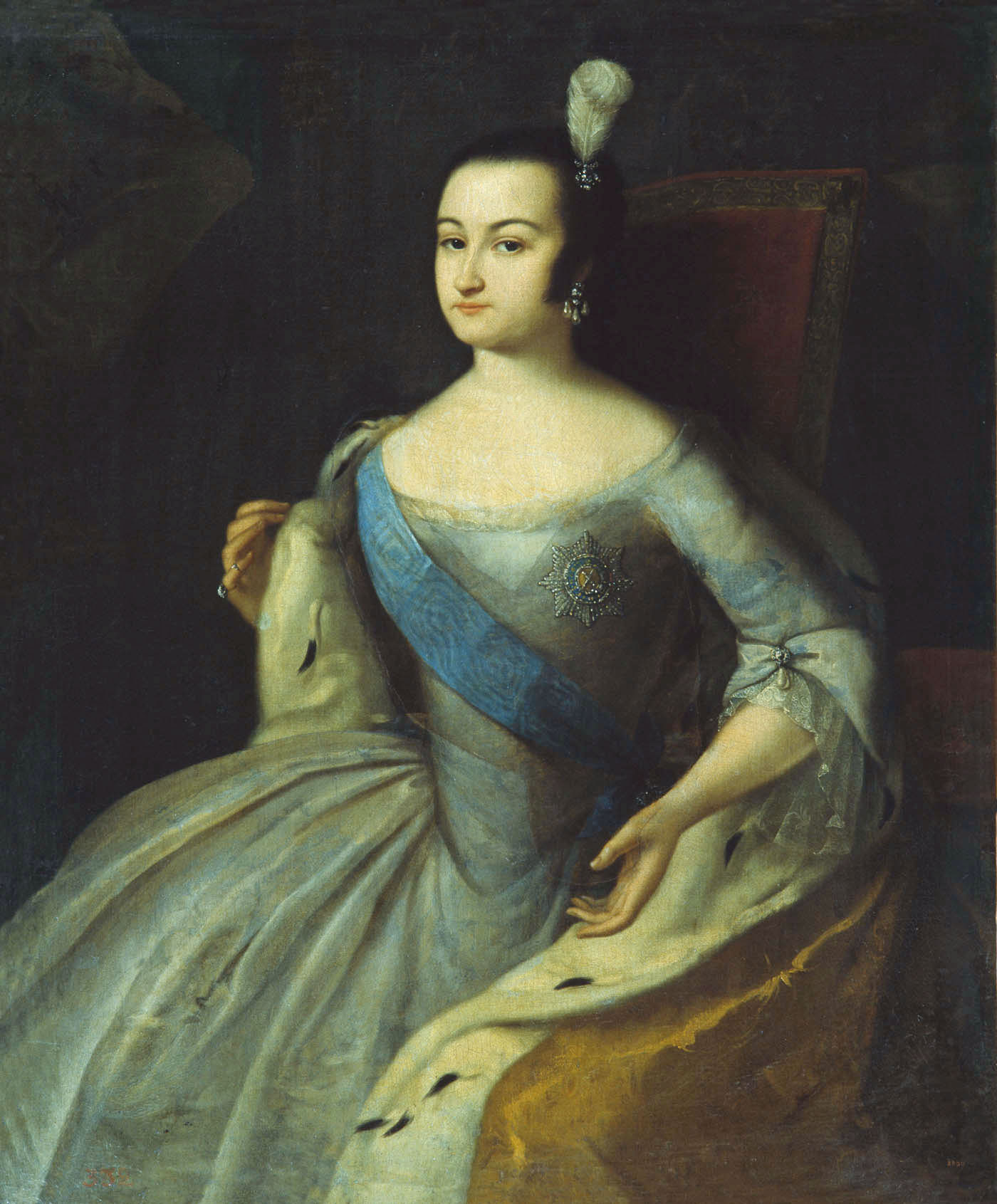
- Portrait c. 1740

Regent of Russia Grand Duchess
- Regency: 20 November 1740 – 6 December 1741
- Monarch: Ivan VI
- Predecessor: Ernst Johann von Biron
- Born: 18 December 1718; Rostock, Mecklenburg-Schwerin, Holy Roman Empire
- Died: 19 March 1746 (aged 27); Kholmogory, Archangelgorod Governorate, Russian Empire
- Burial: Annunciation Church, Alexander Nevsky Monastery
- Spouse: Duke Anthony Ulrich of Brunswick (m. 1739)
- Issue: Ivan VI of Russia; Catherine Antonovna; Elizabeth Antonovna; Peter Antonovich; Alexei Antonovich
Names
- Elisabeth Katharina Christine later Anna Leopoldovna
- House: House of Mecklenburg-Brunswick-Romanov
- Father: Charles Leopold, Duke of Mecklenburg
- Mother: Catherine Ivanovna of Russia
- Religion: Russian Orthodox prev. Lutheran

Anna Leopoldovna (Russian: А́нна Леопо́льдовна; 18 December 1718 – 19 March 1746), born Elisabeth Katharina Christine von Mecklenburg-Schwerin and also known as Anna Carlovna (А́нна Ка́рловна), was regent of Russia for just over a year (1740–1741) during the minority of her infant son Emperor Ivan VI.

== Biography ==
=== Early life ===
Anna Leopoldovna was born Elisabeth Katharina Christine, the daughter of Karl Leopold, Duke of Mecklenburg-Schwerin, by his wife, Catherine, the eldest daughter of Tsar Ivan V of Russia. Catherine's father, Ivan V, was the elder brother and co-ruler of Russia with Peter the Great, but because he was mentally challenged and unfit to rule, all power was in the hands of Peter the Great, who was like a father to Catherine and looked out for her interest as long as he was alive.

Elisabeth's mother, Catherine, was the third wife of Duke Karl Leopold, who had divorced his first two wives after very short marriages (less than two years each). Catherine was the only wife ever to bear him a living child, and Elisabeth was the only child. In 1721, when Elisabeth was three years old, her mother became pregnant a second time, but the child was stillborn. By then, the marriage between her parents was in trouble, and in 1722, Catherine returned to the court of her uncle Peter the Great. She took her daughter with her, and Elisabeth, therefore, grew up in Russia with little or no contact with her father.

In 1730, Tsar Peter II, who was the last surviving male member of the Romanov dynasty, died unwed, and his dynasty died with him. The Russian privy council debated about whom to invite to the throne, and Elisabeth's mother, Catherine, was one of the candidates who was considered. However, she was passed over for several reasons, and the throne was offered to her younger sister, Anna Ivanovna, who became known to history as Empress Anna of Russia. Anna was a childless widow, and Elisabeth was Catherine's only child. Elisabeth's position at court was, therefore, an important one.

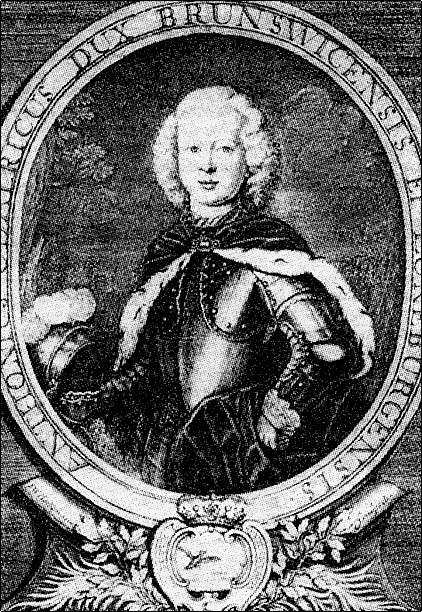
Anthony Ulrich

In 1733, Elisabeth converted to the Russian Orthodox Church and was given the name Anna Leopoldovna, which was a compliment to her aunt, Empress Anna, and also to her father, Karl Leopold, Duke of Mecklenburg-Schwerin. Her conversion to the Orthodox faith made her acceptable as heiress to the throne, but she was never actually declared heiress by her aunt. In 1739, Anna Leopoldovna, as she was now known, was given in marriage to Anthony Ulrich (1714–1774), the second son of Ferdinand Albert, Duke of Brunswick-Wolfenbüttel. Ulrich had lived in Russia since 1733 so that he and his bride could get to know each other better. He was able to do so because he was a younger son, and it was improbable that he would be called upon to shoulder the responsibility of ruling his father's principality. Both circumstances clearly indicate that Empress Anna intended her niece to inherit her throne, and was laying the ground for that by selecting a husband of suitable birth and situation and by observing him at close quarters for several years before the marriage was celebrated.

On 5 October 1740, Empress Anna adopted their newborn son, Ivan, and proclaimed him heir to the Russian throne. On 28 October, just a few weeks after the proclamation, the empress died after she had left directions regarding the succession and appointing her favourite Ernest Biron, Duke of Courland, as regent.

Biron, however, had made himself an object of detestation to the Russian people. After Biron threatened to exile Anna and her spouse to Germany, she had little difficulty working with Field Marshal Burkhard Christoph von Münnich to overthrow him. The coup succeeded, and she assumed the regency on 8 November (O.S.) and took the title of Grand Duchess. Field Marshal Münnich personally arrested Biron in his apartment, where the formerly-tyrannical Biron ingloriously begged for his life on his knees.

=== Regency ===
Anna knew little of the character of the people with whom she had to deal, knew even less of the conventions and politics of Russian government and speedily quarrelled with her principal supporters.

According to the Dictionary of Russian History, she ordered an investigation of the garment industry when new uniforms received by the military were found to be of inferior quality. When the investigation revealed inhumane conditions, she issued decrees mandating a minimum wage and maximum working hours in that industry, as well as the establishment of medical facilities at every garment factory. She also presided over a brilliant victory by Russian forces at the Battle of Villmanstrand in Finland after Sweden had declared war against her government.

She had an influential favourite, Julia von Mengden. Anna's love life took up much time, as she was involved simultaneously in what were described as "passionate" affairs with Saxon Ambassador Count Moritz zu Lynar and her lady-in-waiting, Mengden. Anna's husband did his best to ignore the affairs. After becoming regent, Anton was marginalised by being forced to sleep in another palace, and Anna took Lynar, Mengden or both to bed with her. At times, the grand duke would appear to complain about being "cuckolded", but he was always sent away.

At one point, Anna proposed to have Lynar marry Mengden to unite the two people who were closest to her in the world together. The regent's relationship with Mengden caused much disgust in Russia, but the French historian Henri Troyat wrote that amongst the many libertines of St. Petersburg, Anna's "sexual eclecticism" in having both a man and a woman as her lovers was seen as a sign of Anna's openmindedness.

More damagingly, many in the Russian elite believed that at the age of 22, Anna was too young and immature to be the regent of Russia and that her preoccupation with her relationships with Lynar and Mengden at the expense of governing Russia were making her a danger to the state.

Troyat described Anna as an "indolent day-dreamer" who spent her mornings reading novels in bed, got up only in the afternoon, liked to wander around her apartment when she was barely dressed and had her hair undone and was principally interested in reading novels. Anna's preference for handing out government jobs to Baltic German aristocrats caused much resentment on the part of the ethnic Russian nobility, which, for neither the first nor the last time, complained that a disproportionate number of Baltic Germans held high office.

=== Later life ===
In December 1741, Elizabeth, the daughter of Peter the Great, excited the guards to revolt and had already become a favourite of them. The coup overcame the insignificant opposition and was supported by the ambassadors of France and Sweden because of the pro-Austrian and pro-British policies of Anna's government. The French ambassador in St. Petersburg, the marquis de La Chétardie, was deeply involved in planning Elizabeth's coup and bribed numerous officers of the Imperial Guard into supporting it.

The victorious regime first imprisoned the family in the fortress of Dünamünde, near Riga, and then exiled them to Kholmogory on the Northern Dvina River. Anna eventually died of puerperal fever on 19 March 1746, nine days after the birth of her son Alexei after more than four years in prison. Her family continued in prison for many years. A further 18 years were to pass before her son, Ivan VI, was murdered in Shlisselburg Fortress on 16 July 1764, and her husband, Anthony Ulrich, died in Kholmogory on 4 May 1774 after spending a further decade in prison. Her remaining four children (Ekaterina, Elizaveta, Peter and Alexei) were released from prison into the custody of their aunt, Danish Queen Dowager Juliana Maria of Brunswick-Wolfenbüttel, on 30 June 1780 and settled in Jutland, where they lived in comfort under house arrest in Horsens for the rest of their lives under the guardianship of Juliana and at the expense of Catherine the Great. The eldest of them had been only months old when she and her family had been placed in prison. The other three had been born in captivity. They were, therefore, not used to social life, and even after they had gained their freedom, they made little or no contact with people outside their own small "court" of some forty to fifty people, all of whom Danish except for the priest. None of them ever married or left progeny.

== Family ==
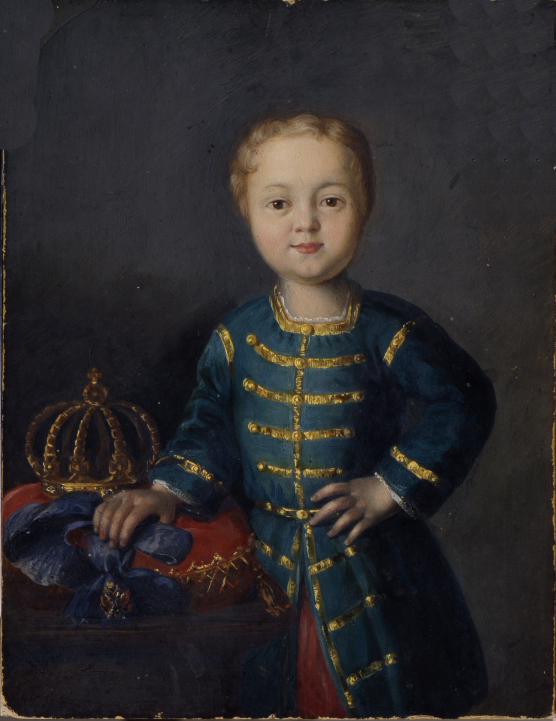
Ivan VI

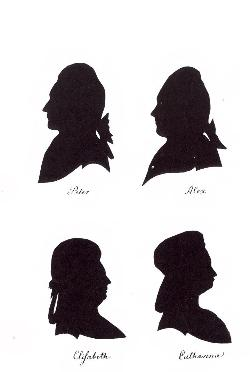
Silhouettes of her four younger children in Horsens-Peter, Alexei, Elizabeth and Catherine

Anna Leopoldovna had the following children:

- Ivan VI (1740–1764) (reigning Emperor 1740–1741)
- Catherine Antonovna of Brunswick (1741–1807) (released to house arrest in Horsens in Denmark in 1780)
- Elizabeth Antonovna of Brunswick (1743–1782) (released to house arrest in Horsens in Denmark in 1780)
- Peter Antonovich of Brunswick (1745–1798) (released to house arrest in Horsens in Denmark in 1780)
- Alexei Antonovich of Brunswick (1746–1787) (released to house arrest in Horsens in Denmark in 1780)
