= Ivan Tvorozhnikov =

Russian painter

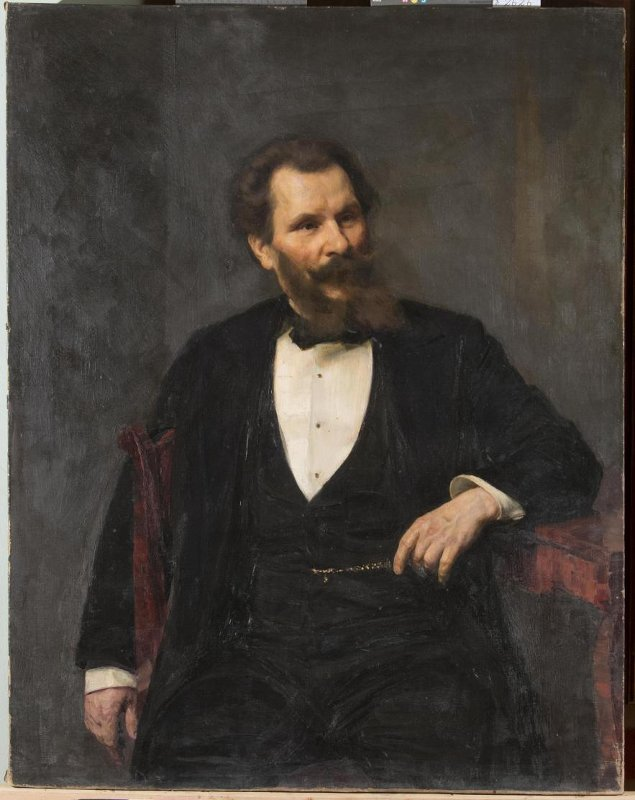
- Portrait by Vasily Savinsky, 1910; Russian Museum, St. Petersburg
- Born: October 10, 1848; Moscow Governorate, Russian Empire
- Died: 1919 (aged 70–71); Petrograd
- Education: Imperial Academy of Arts (1875)
- Known for: Genre painting
- Elected: Member Academy of Arts (1906)

Ivan Ivanovich Tvorozhnikov (Russian: Иван Иванович Творожников; October 10, 1848 – 1919) was a Russian painter in the Realist style, active in St. Petersburg from Tsar Alexander III's reign to the Civil War days, known for his genre pictures of peasants, close to the Peredvizhniki.

== Biography ==
Tvorozhnikov graduated from the Saint Petersburg Drawing School attached to the Society of Imperial Incentive. Finishing his studies there in 1868, he entered the Academy of Arts, where he continued his education up to 1875. Tvorozhnikov's major works are considered to be the paintings The salvation books vendor (1888), Grandmother and granddaughter, Mirovich by the corpse of Ioann Antonovich on July 5, 1764, By the church (1889) and God sent the mercy.

A son of peasants from Moscow Guberniya, Tvorozhnikov was born in Zhukovo village of the Tver uyezd. At 12 years old, he was sent to Saint Petersburg for wages. Later, Tvorozhnikov repeatedly visited the Tver Guberniya.

== Works ==
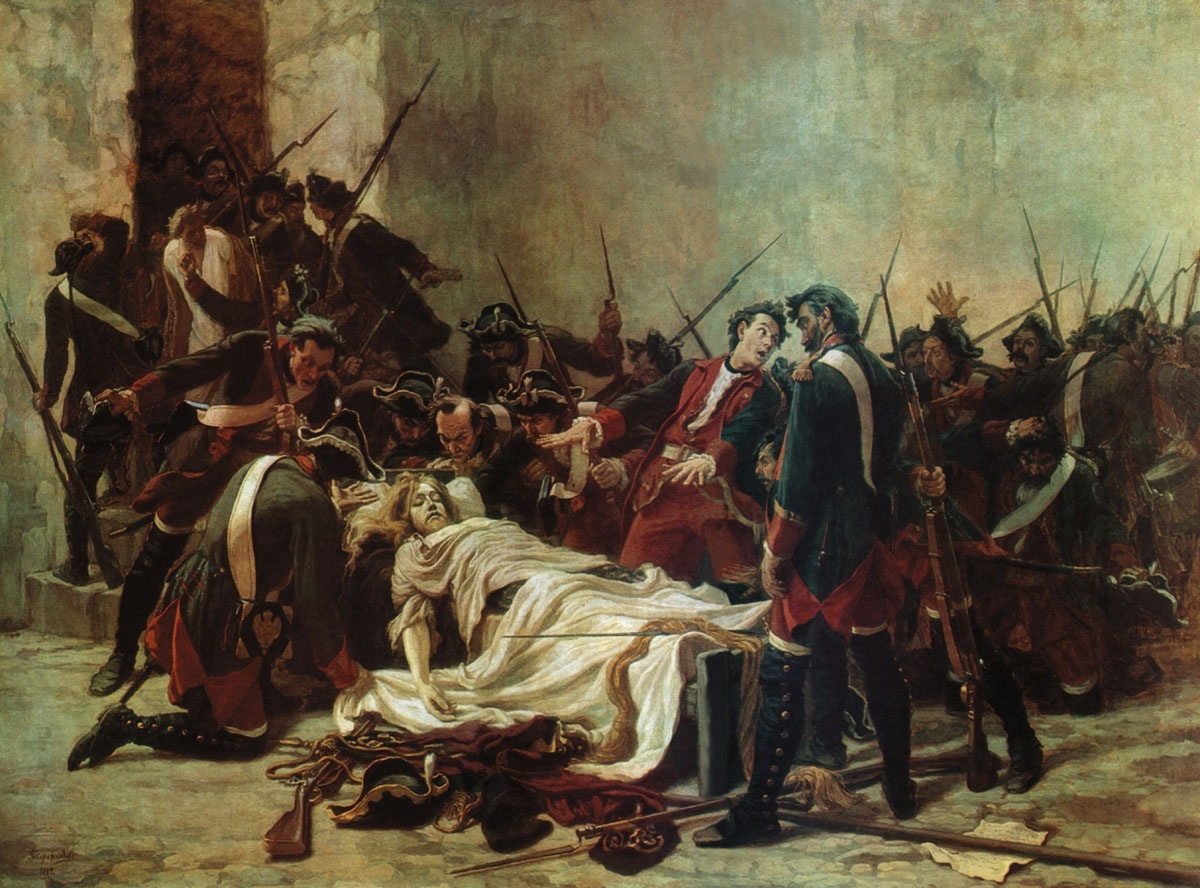
Mirovich by the corpse of Ioann Antonovich on July 5, 1764 (1884)

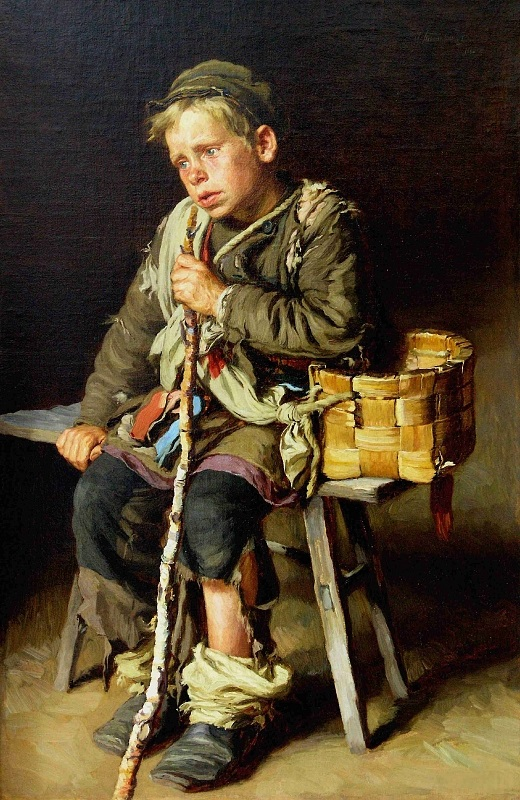
Boy beggar with a basket (1886)

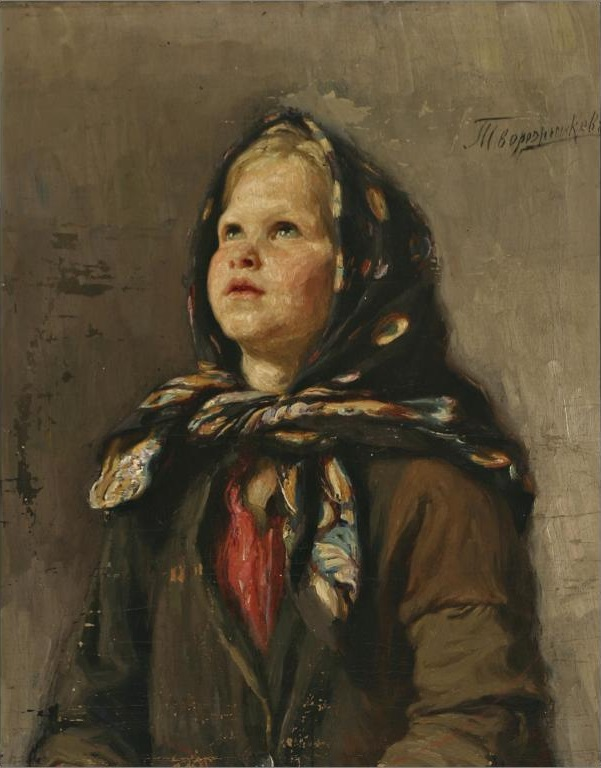
Girl with a scarf

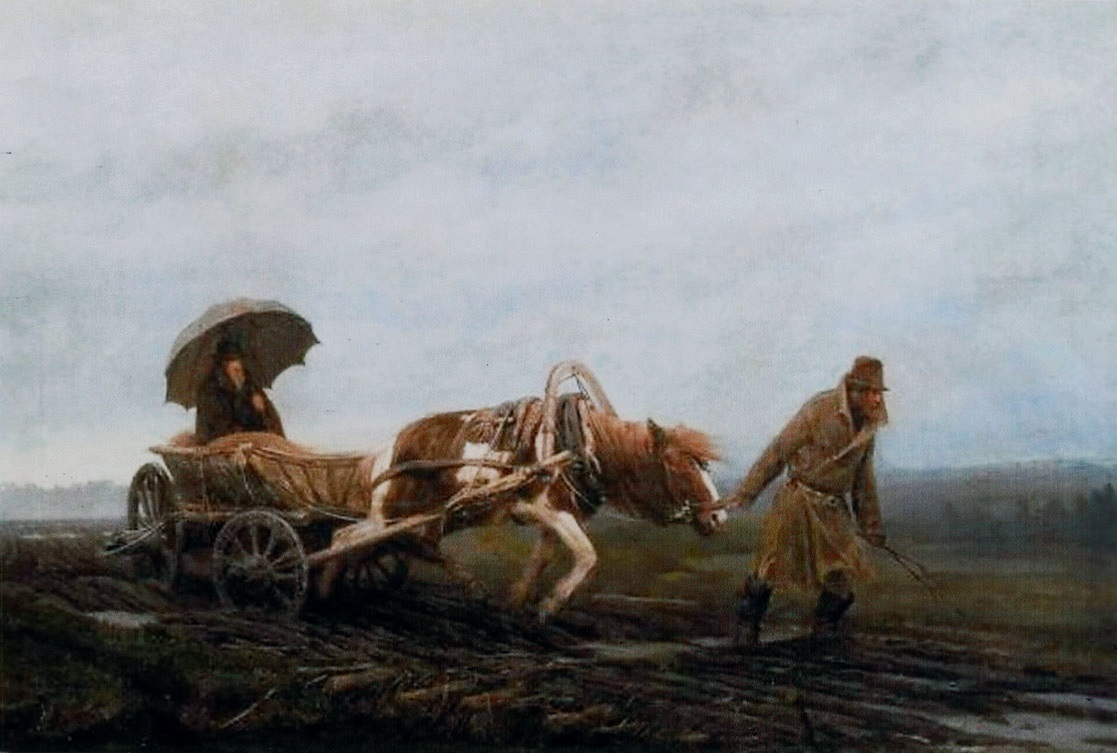
Zemsky doctor

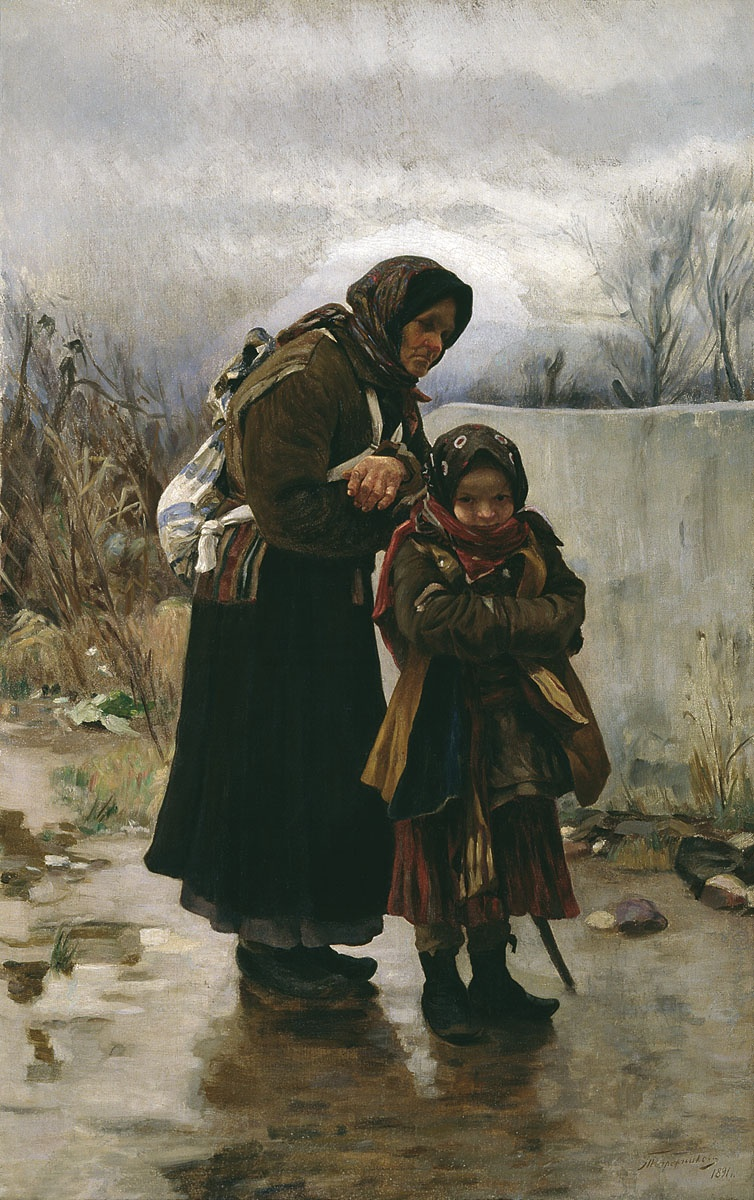
Grandmother and granddaughter (1891)
