= Brian Lowry =

English footballer

Personal information
- Full name: Brian Thomas Lowry
- Date of birth: 12 December 1936
- Place of birth: Manchester, England
- Position: Winger

Youth career
- Manchester United

Senior career*
Years	Team	Apps	(Gls)
1954–1956	Grimsby Town	12	(1)
1956–1957	Aldershot	0	(0)
- * Club domestic league appearances and goals

Brian Thomas Lowry (born 12 December 1936) is an English former professional footballer who played as a winger.
