= Duke Anthony Ulrich of Brunswick =

German prince and military officer

Anthony Ulrich
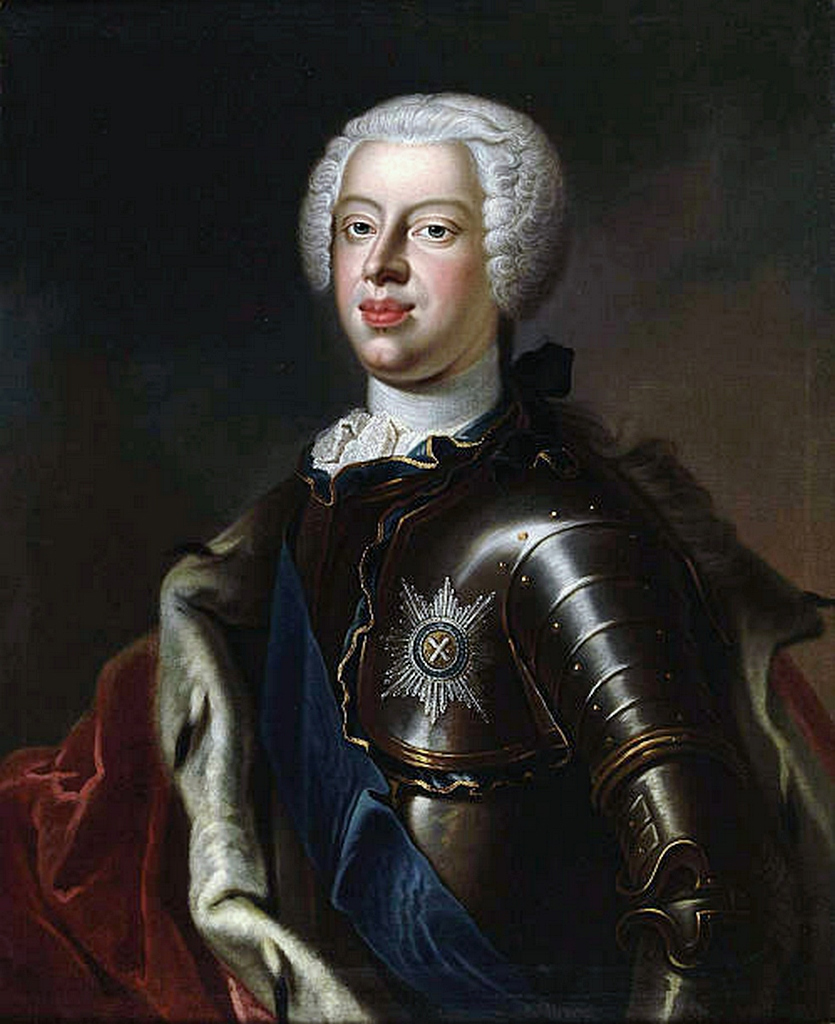
- Portrait by an unknown painter, 1740
- Born: 28 August 1714; Bevern, Principality of Brunswick-Wolfenbüttel, Holy Roman Empire
- Died: 4 May 1774 (aged 59) (O.S.); Kholmogory, Arkhangelogorod Governorate, Russian Empire
- Spouse: Grand Duchess Anna Leopoldovna of Russia (m. 1739; died 1746)
- Issue: Ivan VI of Russia; Catherine Antonovna; Elizabeth Antonovna; Peter Antonovich; Alexei Antonovich
- House: House of Mecklenburg-Brunswick-Romanov
- Father: Ferdinand Albert II, Duke of Brunswick-Lüneburg
- Mother: Princess Antoinette of Brunswick-Wolfenbüttel

Duke Anthony Ulrich of Brunswick-Lüneburg (28 August 1714 – 4 May 1774) was a German prince and military officer.

== Biography ==
Anthony Ulrich was the second son of Ferdinand Albert II, Duke of Brunswick-Lüneburg and Princess Antoinette of Brunswick-Wolfenbüttel. His mother's sister, Elizabeth, wife of Charles VI, Holy Roman Emperor, arranged for his marriage to HSH Duchess Elisabeth of Mecklenburg-Schwerin (known as "Anna Leopoldovna"), daughter of Charles Leopold, Duke of Mecklenburg-Schwerin, and granddaughter of Tsar Ivan V; and he was taken to Russia in 1733, so that he and Anna could get to know each other. The marriage took place in 1739. This marriage was intended to strengthen the relationships between the houses of Romanov and Habsburg. In 1740, their infant son, Ivan, became emperor as Ivan VI. Initially, Duke Ernst Biron of Kurland was regent, but when rumors surfaced that Biron planned on exiling Anthony and Anna to Germany, they staged a coup and Anna was named regent. Not long after, a coup in 1741 removed the family from power.

The new Empress, Elizabeth, had Anthony Ulrich, his wife, and their children imprisoned. They remained so for the rest of their lives. The years of imprisonment were hard, and the family was periodically denied many necessary things. Virtually all communication with the outside world, with the exception of a few servants, was banned. The governor of Arkhangelsk regularly visited them to inquire about their health.

In 1762, Elizabeth died, and the new Empress Catherine offered the Duke permission to leave Russia, with the condition he leave his children behind; but he declined. He lost his eyesight before he died. He was buried very discreetly, and the soldiers were forbidden to reveal the place of his burial, but his coffin was decorated with silver.

In 1780, the surviving children were released from prison into the custody of their aunt, the Danish queen dowager Juliana Maria of Brunswick-Wolfenbüttel. They were taken to Novodvinsk fortress the night of 27 June and left Russia on 30 June. They settled in Jutland, where they lived in under a comfortable house arrest in Horsens for the rest of their lives, under the guardianship of Juliana and at the expense of Catherine. Having lived as prisoners, they were not used to social life, and kept a small "court" of 40/50 people, all Danish except for the priest. The pension granted them by Catherine was paid until the last of them died in 1807.

== Family ==
Anthony Ulrich and Anna Leopoldovna had the following children:

- Ivan VI (1740–1764) (reigning Emperor 1740–1741)
- Catherine Antonovna of Brunswick (1741–1807) (released to house arrest in Horsens in Denmark in 1780)
- Elizabeth Antonovna of Brunswick (1743–1782) (released to house arrest in Horsens in Denmark in 1780)
- Peter Antonovich of Brunswick (1745–1798) (released to house arrest in Horsens in Denmark in 1780)
- Alexei Antonovich of Brunswick (1746–1787) (released to house arrest in Horsens in Denmark in 1780)

== Ancestry ==
Ancestors of Duke Anthony Ulrich of Brunswick

16. Henry III of Brunswick-Lüneburg
8. Augustus the Younger, Duke of Brunswick-Lüneburg (=24)
17. Ursula of Saxe-Lauenburg
4. Ferdinand Albert I, Duke of Brunswick-Lüneburg
18. John Albert II, Duke of Mecklenburg-Gustrow
9. Elisabeth Sophie of Mecklenburg-Gustrow (=25)
19. Elisabeth of Mecklenburg-Gadebusch
2. Ferdinand Albert II, Duke of Brunswick-Lüneburg
20. Maurice, Landgrave of Hesse-Kassel
10. Frederick, Landgrave of Hesse-Eschwege
21. Juliane of Nassau-Siegen
5. Christina Wilhelmina of Hesse-Eschwege
22. John Casimir, Count Palatine of Kleeburg
11. Countess Palatine Eleonora Catherine of Zweibrücken
23. Catherine of Sweden
1. Duke Anthony Ulrich of Brunswick
24. Augustus the Younger, Duke of Brunswick-Lüneburg (=8)
12. Anthony Ulrich, Duke of Brunswick-Wolfenbüttel
25. Elisabeth Sophia of Mecklenburg-Gustrow (=9)
6. Louis Rudolph, Duke of Brunswick-Lüneburg
26. Frederick, Duke of Schleswig-Holstein-Sønderburg-Norburg
13. Elisabeth Juliana Schleswig-Holstein-Sønderborg-Nordborg
27. Eleanor of Anhalt-Zerbst
3. Antoinette of Brunswick-Wolfenbüttel
28. Joachim Ernest of Oettingen-Oettingen
14. Albert Ernest I of Oettingen-Oettingen
29. Anna Dorothea of Hohenlohe-Neuenstein
7. Princess Christine Louise of Oettingen-Oettingen
30. Eberhard III, Duke of Württemberg
15. Christine Friederike of Württemberg
31. Anna Catherine of Salm-Kyrburg
