= Catherine Antonovna of Brunswick =

Russian noble

Catherine Antonovna
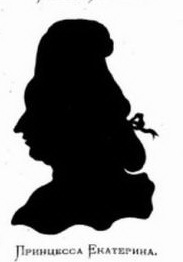
- Silhouette of Catherine during her stay at Horsens.
- Born: 15 July 1741; Saint Petersburg
- Died: 9 April 1807 (aged 65); Horsens
Names
- Catherine Antonovna
- House: House of Mecklenburg-Brunswick-Romanov
- Father: Duke Anthony Ulrich of Brunswick
- Mother: Grand Duchess Anna Leopoldovna of Russia

Catherine Antonovna of Brunswick-Lüneburg (Russian: Екатерина Антоновна Брауншвейгская, romanized: Yekaterina Antonovna Braunshveygskaya; 1741–1807) was the daughter of Duke Anthony Ulrich of Brunswick and Grand Duchess Anna Leopoldovna of Russia and sister of Ivan VI. She was imprisoned by Empress Elizabeth of Russia along with her family from 1742 to 1780 at Kholmogory, and in 1780, she and two brothers and a sister were placed under house arrest for the rest of their lives in Horsens. She was the last descendant of Ivan V of Russia.

She became deaf after being dropped during the chaos of Empress Elizabeth's coup, and like her siblings, was sickly and suffered from bouts of seizures for much of her life.

She and her three surviving siblings were released into the custody of their aunt, the Danish queen dowager Juliana Maria of Brunswick-Wolfenbüttel, on 30 June 1780, and settled in Jutland. There they lived under house arrest in Horsens for the rest of their lives under the guardianship of Juliana and at the expense of Catherine. Although they were prisoners, they lived in relative comfort and retained a small "court" of between 40 and 50 people, all Danish except for the priest.

By 1798, Catherine lived alone in Horsens, since all her siblings had died. In 1803, she wrote a letter to Alexander I of Russia: she told him how her Danish servants took advantage of her difficulty in hearing and talking, described how much she had missed the Russian prison in Kholmogory, where she and her siblings had been happy together, and asked him to be allowed to return. He never replied.
