= Ivan VI of Russia =

Emperor of Russia from 1740 to 1741

Ivan VI
- Tsar
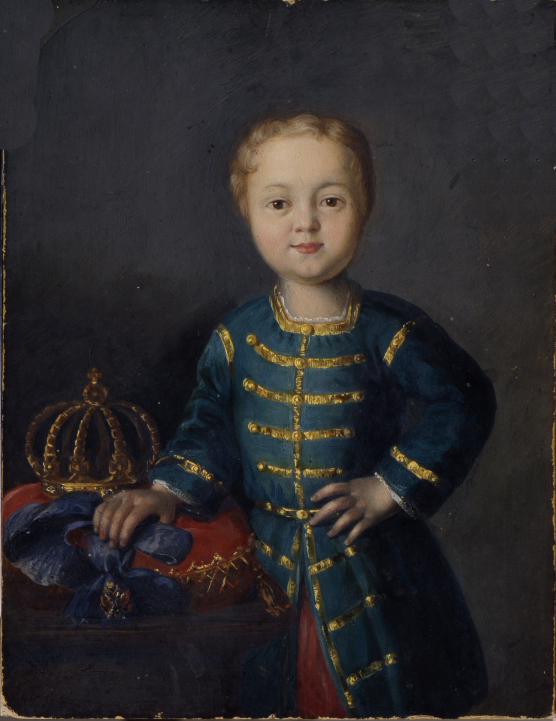
- Portrait, 1750

Emperor of Russia
- Reign: 28 October 1740 – 6 December 1741
- Predecessor: Anna
- Successor: Elizabeth
- Regent: Ernst Johann von Biron (1740); Anna Leopoldovna (1740–1741)
- Born: 23 August 1740; Saint Petersburg, Russia
- Died: 16 July 1764 (aged 23); Shlisselburg, Russia
- Burial: Kholmogory or Shlisselburg
- House: Mecklenburg-Brunswick-Romanov
- Father: Duke Anthony Ulrich of Brunswick
- Mother: Grand Duchess Anna Leopoldovna of Russia
- Religion: Russian Orthodox

Ivan VI Antonovich (Russian: Иван VI Антонович; 23 August [O.S. 12 August] 1740 – 16 July [O.S. 5 July] 1764), also known as Ioann Antonovich, (Note: Russian: Иоанн Антонович) was Emperor of Russia from October 1740 until he was overthrown by his cousin Elizabeth Petrovna in December 1741. He was only two months old when he was proclaimed emperor and his mother, Anna Leopoldovna, named regent, but the throne was seized in a coup after little more than a year. Ivan and his parents were imprisoned far from the capital, and lived out their lives in captivity.

After more than twenty years as a prisoner, Ivan was killed by his guards when some army officers (unknown to Ivan) attempted to free him. His surviving siblings, who had been born in prison, were then released into the custody of their aunt, the Danish queen dowager Juliana Maria of Brunswick-Wolfenbüttel. They settled in Horsens, where they lived out their lives in comfort under house arrest.

== Emperor of Russia ==
Ivan was born on 23 August 1740 at Saint Petersburg, the eldest child of Duke Anthony Ulrich of Brunswick-Lüneburg by his wife, Duchess Anna Leopoldovna of Mecklenburg-Schwerin, the only niece of the childless Empress Anna of Russia, and the only granddaughter of Tsar Ivan V. She had lived in Russia almost all her life, and her husband had also made his home in that country, in the expectation that they or their progeny would inherit the throne upon the death of the empress.

This expectation was fulfilled within two months of the birth of their first child. On 5 October 1740 the infant Ivan was adopted by his grandaunt (who was on her deathbed) and declared her heir apparent. The empress also declared that her longtime lover and advisor, Ernst Johann von Biron, duke of Courland, would serve as regent until Ivan came of age. Indeed, the desire to ensure that her lover would enjoy power and influence after her death was the primary reason that the dying empress chose to name as her heir the infant rather than his mother.

Empress Anna died soon thereafter on 28 October 1740. The following day the infant was proclaimed emperor as Ivan VI, Autocrat of All The Russias, and Biron became regent. However, the idea of Biron wielding power was not acceptable either to Ivan's parents or to most of the nobility. During his years as Anna's lover he had made many enemies, and was tremendously unpopular at court. Within three weeks Ivan's father had engineered Biron's fall. At midnight on 18/19 November 1740 Biron was seized in his bedroom by partisans of the royal couple and banished to Siberia (he was later permitted to reside at Yaroslavl). Ivan's mother, Anna Leopoldovna, was made regent, though the vice-chancellor, Andrei Osterman, effectively ran the government during her brief regency.

== Deposition and imprisonment ==
Ivan's reign, and his mother's regency, lasted thirteen months, for on 6 December 1741 a coup d'état placed Elizabeth of Russia on the throne, and Ivan and his family were imprisoned in the fortress of Dünamünde (13 December 1742) after a preliminary detention at Riga, from where the new Empress had at first intended to send the unhappy family home to Brunswick. In June 1744, following the Lopukhina Affair, the Empress transferred Ivan to Kholmogory on the White Sea where, isolated from his family and seeing no one other than his jailer, he remained for the next twelve years. When news of his confinement at Kholmogory circulated more widely, young Ivan was secretly transferred to the fortress of Shlisselburg (1756) where he was still more rigorously guarded, not even the commandant of the fortress knowing the true identity of "a certain prisoner". Throughout Elizabeth's reign her predecessor's name was subjected to a damnatio memoriae procedure; all coins, documents, and publications bearing Ivan's name and titles were systematically confiscated and destroyed, and are now an extraordinarily rare find.

Upon the accession of Peter III in 1762, Ivan's situation seemed about to improve, for the new emperor visited him and sympathised with his plight, but Peter was deposed just a few months later. New instructions were sent to Ivan's guardian to place manacles on his charge, and even to scourge him should he become unmanageable.

== Death ==
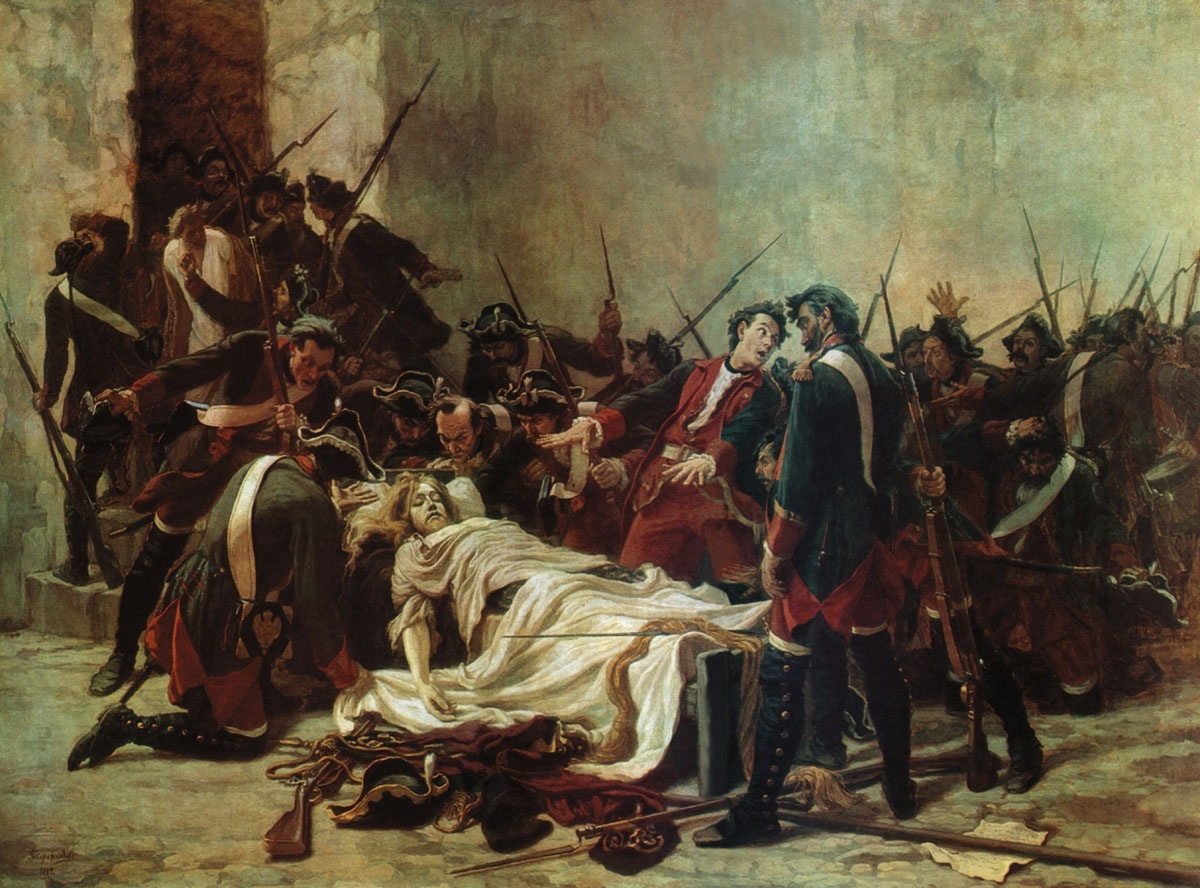
Mirovich Standing over the Corpse of Ivan VI (1884) by Ivan Tvorozhnikov

On the accession of Catherine II, in the summer of 1762, still more stringent orders were sent to the officer in charge of "the nameless one"; if any attempt were made from outside to release him, the prisoner was to be put to death. Under no circumstances was he to be delivered alive into anyone's hands, without an express written order in the Empress's handwriting. By this time twenty years of solitary confinement had disturbed Ivan's mental equilibrium, though he did not seem to have been actually insane. Nevertheless, despite the mystery surrounding him, he was well aware of his imperial origin and always called himself Gosudar (Sovereign). Instructions had been given not to educate him, but he had been taught his letters and could read his Bible. Since his presence at Shlisselburg could not remain concealed forever, its eventual discovery was the cause of his demise.

A sub-lieutenant of the garrison, Vasily Mirovich, learned of his identity and formed a plan for freeing and proclaiming him Emperor. At midnight on 5 July 1764, Mirovich won over some of the garrison, arrested the commandant, Berednikov, and demanded the release of Ivan. His jailers, on orders of their commander, an officer surnamed Chekin, immediately murdered Ivan in compliance with the secret instructions already in their possession. Mirovich and his supporters were arrested and executed shortly thereafter. Ivan was buried quietly in the fortress, and his death secured Catherine II's position on the throne until her own son came of age.

Ivan's siblings, who were born in prison, were released into the custody of their aunt, the Danish-Norwegian queen dowager, Juliana Maria of Brunswick-Wolfenbüttel, on 30 June 1780 and settled at Horsens in Jutland. There, they lived out under house arrest their lives under Juliana's guardianship and at Catherine's expense. Although they were prisoners, they lived in relative comfort and retained a small "court" of forty to fifty people, all Danes save the priest.

== See also ==
- Bibliography of Russian history (1613–1917)
- Man in the Iron Mask
- Tsars of Russia family tree

== Notes ==
Ivan VI of Russia House of Romanov Cadet branch of the House of Brunswick-Lüneburg Born: 23 August 1740 Died: 16 July 1764
Regnal titles
Preceded by Anna	Emperor of Russia; 28 October 1740 – 6 December 1741	Succeeded by Elizabeth
