= List of Russian royal mistresses and lovers =

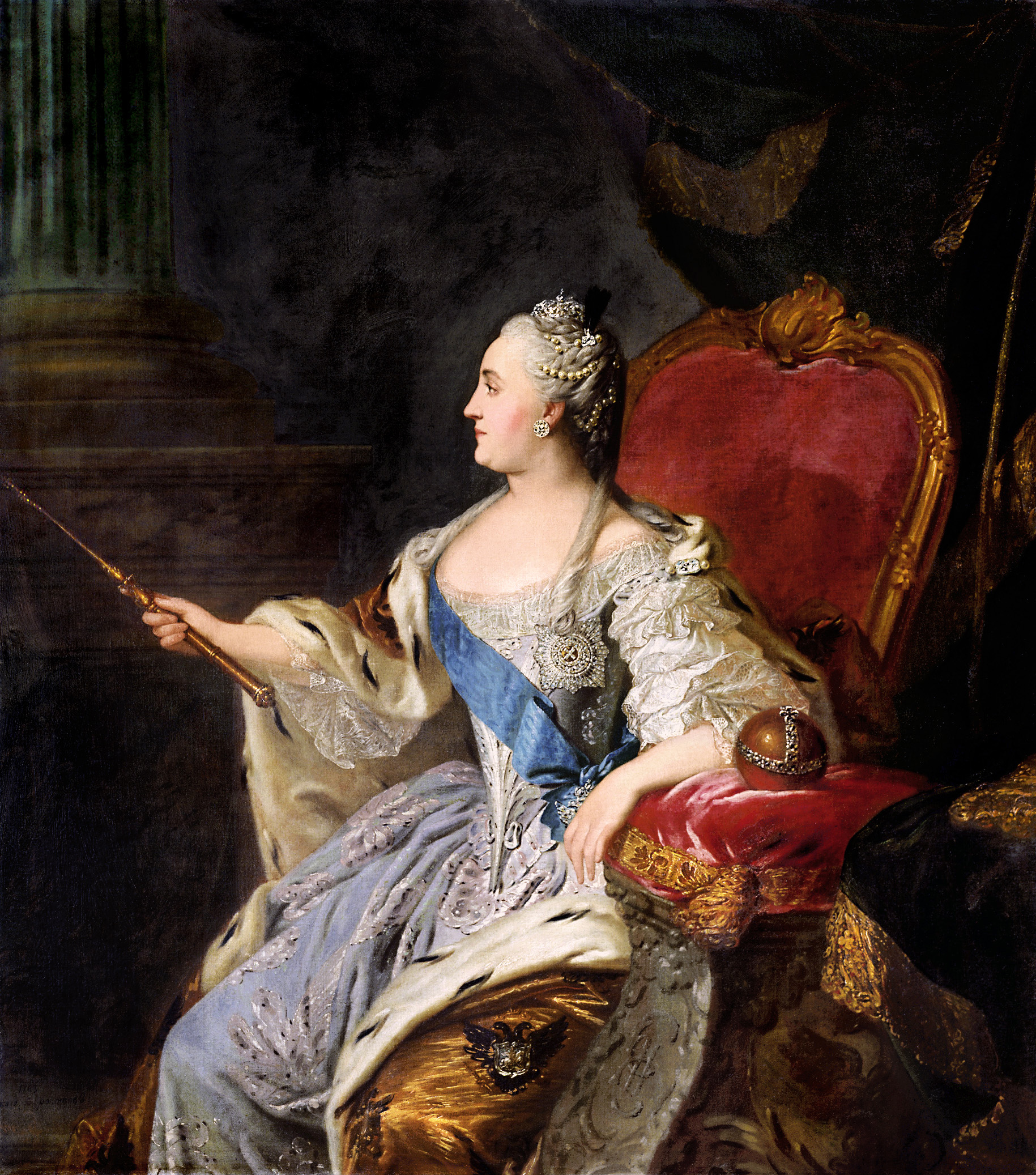
Catherine II

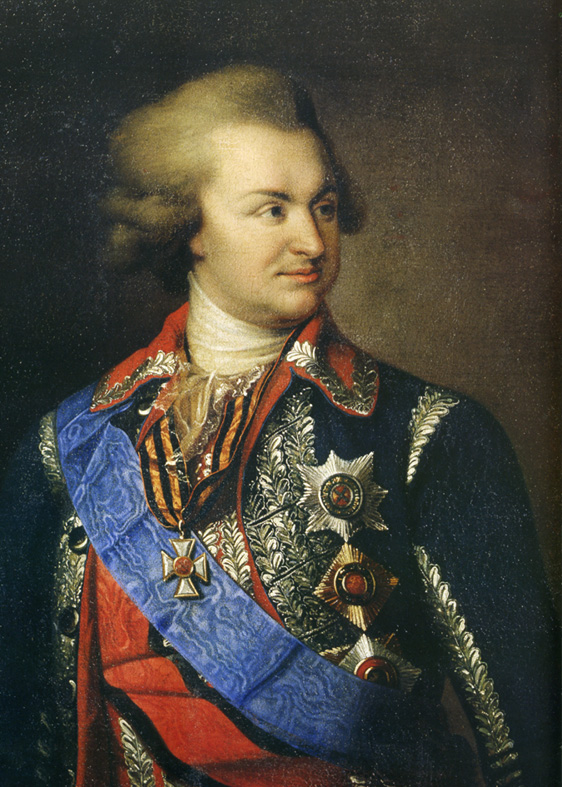
Potemkin

List of Russian royal mistresses and lovers includes mistresses, minions, favourites and simply lovers of the Russian emperors and reigning empresses before and after their coronations. Only two child-emperors did not have any lovers: Peter II and Ivan VI.

== 18th century ==
=== Peter I ===
- Anna Mons — official favourite
- Anisya Kirillovna Tolstaya
- Varvara Arsenyeva — possibly
- Maria Rumyantseva — possibly
- Mary Hamilton
- Letitia Cross
- Avdotya Chernysheva — possibly
- Elżbieta Sieniawska — possibly
- Maria Cantemir — official favourite

=== Catherine I ===
- Boris Sheremetev — before meeting with Peter I
- Alexander Danilovich Menshikov — before meeting with Peter I
- Willem Mons — before coronation
- Piotr Paweł Sapieha — possibly
- Reinhold Gustaw von Loewenwolde

=== Anna ===
- Pyotr Bestuzhev-Ryumin — before coronation
- Ernst Johann von Biron — official favourite

=== Anna Leopoldovna, Regent of Russia ===
- Moritz Karl zu Lynar
- Julia von Mengden

=== Elizabeth ===
- Alexander Buturlin — before coronation
- Semyon Kirillovich Naryshkin — before coronation
- Alexey Yakovlevich Shubin — before coronation
- Alexei Razumovsky— official favourite, possibly husband
- Pimen Lyalin
- Nikita Beketov
- Ivan Shuvalov — official favourite

=== Peter III ===
- Elizaveta Vorontsova

=== Catherine the Great ===
see also: ru:Список мужчин Екатерины II

- Sergei Saltykov (1726–1765) — in 1752—1754 (before coronation). Possibly the father of the future Emperor Paul I.
- Stanisław August Poniatowski — in 1756—1758 (before coronation). Possibly father of the Grand Duchess Anna Petrovna.
- Grigory Orlov — lover since 1759/1760, official favourite in 1762–1772. Father of her illegitimate son Aleksey Grigorievich Bobrinsky (see Bobrinsky family).
- Alexander Vasilchikov — official favourite in 1772–1774.
- Grigory Potemkin — official favourite since 1774 until death, but lover until 1776. Possibly husband and father of illegitimate Elizaveta Grigorievna Temkina.
- Pyotr Zavadovsky — official favorite in 1776—1777
- Semyon Zorich — official favourite in 1777—1778
- Ivan Rimsky-Korsakov — official favourite in 1778—1779
- Alexander Lanskoy — official favourite in 1780—1784
- Alexander Yermolov — official favourite in 1785—1786
- Alexander Dmitriev-Mamonov — official favourite in 1786—1789
- Platon Zubov — official favourite in 1789—1796

=== Paul I ===
- Sophia Razumovskaya — before coronation, had a son illegitimate Semyon Velikiy.
- Olga Zherebtsova — before coronation
- Yekaterina Nelidova — official favourite
- Anna Lopukhina — official favourite
- Madame Chevalier
- Mavra Isidorovna Yuryeva, mother of the illegitimate Marfa Pavlovna Musina-Yuryeva.

== 19th century ==
=== Alexander I ===
- Ekaterina Torsukova — before coronation
- Sofia Meshcherskaya — before coronation, possibly mother of the illegitimate Nikolai Lukash.
- Maria Naryshkina — official favourite, mother of many his illegitimate children, survived only Sofia Naryshkina.
- Varvara Turkestanova
- Marguerite Georges — possibly
- Marie-Thérèse Bourgoin

=== Nicholas I ===
- Anna-Maria Charlota de Rutenskiold - before coronation
- Varvara Yakovleva
- Varvara Nelidova— official favourite
- Ekaterina Petrovna Mussina-Pushkina — possibly, rumoured illegitimate daughter, Sofia Sergeyevna Trubetskaya

=== Alexander II ===
- Alexandra Albedinskaya
- Catherine Dolgorukova — official favourite, later wife. Mother of four illegitimate children (see Yuryevsky family).

=== Alexander III ===
- Maria Meshcherskaya — before coronation. First love, possibly not lover.

=== Nicholas II ===
- Geisha Mooroka O-Matsu (Моорока О-Мацу) — during voyage in Japan in 1891. Before coronation.
- Mathilde Kschessinska — before coronation.

== Sources ==
- Гельбиг Г. фон. Русские избранники. — М, 1999. = Georg Adolf Wilhelm Von Helbig. Russische Günstlinge. Tübingen, J.G. Cotta, 1809.
