= Tryphon =

Tryphon, Triphon, or Trypho may refer to:

== People ==
=== People of church ===
- Diodotus Tryphon (fl. 144–138 BC), Seleucid ruler
- Salvius Tryphon (fl. c. 100 BC), rebel slave
- Tryphon (grammarian) (c. 60 BC – 10 BC), Greek grammarian
- Tarfon (c. 100), Jewish rabbi
- Trypho (fl. 2nd century), Jewish philosopher in Dialogue with Trypho, possibly same as the rabbi
- Trypho (theologian) (fl. AD 240), Bible scholar
- Tryphon (Turkestanov) (1861–1934), hierarch of the Russian Orthodox Church
- Saint Tryphon (disambiguation), several saints

=== Other people ===
- Tryphon, a surname of Ptolemy Philopator (according to Pliny the Elder)
- Tryphon Kin-Kiey Mulumba (born 1949), Congolese politician
- Tryphon Samaras, Greek hairdresser and television personality
- Trifonas Nikolaidis (born 1944), Cypriot-Israeli singer

== Other ==
- Tryphon (play), a 1668 play by the Irish writer Roger Boyle
- Tryphon (wasp), a genus in the family Ichneumonidae
- Professor Calculus (French: Professeur Tryphon Tournesol), a fictional character in The Adventures of Tintin

== See also ==
- Trifon, Russian variant of the name
