= Trifon =

Trifon or Trifón (Russian: Трифон) is a given name derived from the Ancient Greek: Τρύφων, romanized: Tryphon, lit. 'one who lives in luxury'. An archaic transliteration from Greek is Trufon. It is used by Russians and other peoples of East Orthodox denomination. The word may also be used as a surname and several patronymic surnames, Trifonov, Trifonenko, Trifonyuk, Трифоновски, Trifonovski are derived from it.

In Finnic languages, a variant is Triihpo, which appeared as a result of an f → hp change. Another variant of the word is Ruippo, a surname which was used in Southern Karelia and Eastern Savo before World War II. Notable people with the name include:

== Given name ==
- Metropolitan Trifon (1861–1934), hierarch of the Russian Orthodox Church
- Trifon Datsinski (born 1953), Bulgarian equestrian
- Trifón Gómez (1889–1955), Spanish politician
- Trifon Ivanov (1965–2016), Bulgarian football player
- Trifon Korobeynikov (16th-century), Moscow merchant and traveller
- Trifon Shevaldin (1888–1954), Soviet military officer

== Surname ==
- Nicolas Trifon (1949–2023), Romanian-born academic, editor and linguist in France

== See also ==
- Trifon Zarezan, Bulgarian custom in honour of Saint Tryphon
- Tryphon (disambiguation), a number of people of the name
- Saint Tryphon (disambiguation), several saints
- Rabbi Tarfon or Tarphon, Hebrew: רבי טרפון (between 70 and 135 CE), member of the third generation of the Mishnah sages
- Saint-Triphon
