= Ekaterina Orlova =

Ekaterina Orlova may refer to:

- Ekaterina Orlova (volleyball)
- Ekaterina Orlova (courtier)
