= Trifonov =

Trifonov (Russian: Три́фонов), feminine: Trifonova, is a Bulgarian and Russian patronymic surname derived from the given name Trifon. Notable people with the surname include:

- Aleksandr Trifonov (biathlete) (born 1986), Kazakh biathlete
- Aleksandr Trifonov (canoeist), Russian sprint canoeist
- Andrey Trifonov (born 1965), Russian politician
- Daniil Trifonov (born 1991), Russian concert pianist and composer
- Edward Trifonov (born 1937), Russian-born Israeli molecular biophysicist
- Filip Trifonov (1947–2021), Bulgarian actor
- Iliyan Trifonov (born 1984), Bulgarian football player
- Iglika Trifonova (born 1957), Bulgarian film director
- Iglika Trifonova (photographer), Bulgarian photographer
- Ivan Trifonov (born 1948), Russian cyclist
- Krasen Trifonov (born 1983), Bulgarian football midfielder
- Nadezhda Trifonova (born 2008), Russian diver
- Oleg Trifonov (born 1981), Russian football player
- Petar Trifonov (footballer) (born 1984), Bulgarian football player
- Petar Trifonov (diver)
- Polina Trifonova, Bulgarian table tennis player
- Rumen Trifonov (born 1985), Bulgarian football player
- Rumena Trifonova (1944–2025), Bulgarian film and theatre actress
- Slavi Trifonov (born 1966), Bulgarian actor, singer and politician
- Tihomir Trifonov (born 1986), Bulgarian football player
- Valentin Trifonov (1888–1938), Russian revolutionary
- Yury Trifonov (1925–1981), Russian author
