= Turkestanishvili =

Coat of arms of the Turkestanov family, 1856.

The House of Turkestanishvili (Georgian: თურქესტანიშვილი) or Turkistanishvili (თურქისტანიშვილი), was a noble family with origin in the eastern Georgian region of Kartli who branched out in the 18th century in the Russian Empire, where, as part of the Russian nobility they came to be known as Turkistanov (Russian: Туркистанов) and then as Turkestanov (Туркестанов).

== History ==
The genealogical tradition, such as that enshrined in the work of Prince Ioane of Georgia of the early 19th century, ascribes to the Turkestanishvili family an origin from Turkestan, whence, according to a legend, they came to the Kingdom of Georgia in 1202, in the reign of Queen Tamar. The presence of the family on the Georgian soil, in the province of Somkhiti (Kvemo Kartli), is documented since the late 15th century. They were part of the untitled nobility (aznauri) under the authority of the kings of Kartli. Baadur Turkestanishvili, a diplomat, and Erasti Turkestanishvili, a man of letters, followed King Vakhtang VI in his exile in Russia. Thus, a Russian branch was established and elevated by Vakhtang VI to the dignity of prince (tavadi, knyaz), their new status also recognized and finally confirmed, in 1856, by the Russian government. Of this branch came Princess Varvara Turkestanova (1775–1819), a mistress of Tsar Alexander I of Russia, and Trifon (1861–1934), a revered hierarch of the Russian Orthodox Church. In 1857, a coat of arms submitted by the amateur historian Prince Nikolay Turkestanov was approved by the Russian Senate, but it was never officially registered by the Department of Heraldry.

The Turkestanishvili who remained in Georgia continued to be listed among the aznauri and were mentioned as such in the list of the Georgian noble families attached to the Russo–Georgian treaty of Georgievsk of 1783.
