= Marie-Thérèse Bourgoin =

French actress (1781–1833)

Marie-Thérèse-Etiennette Bourgoin
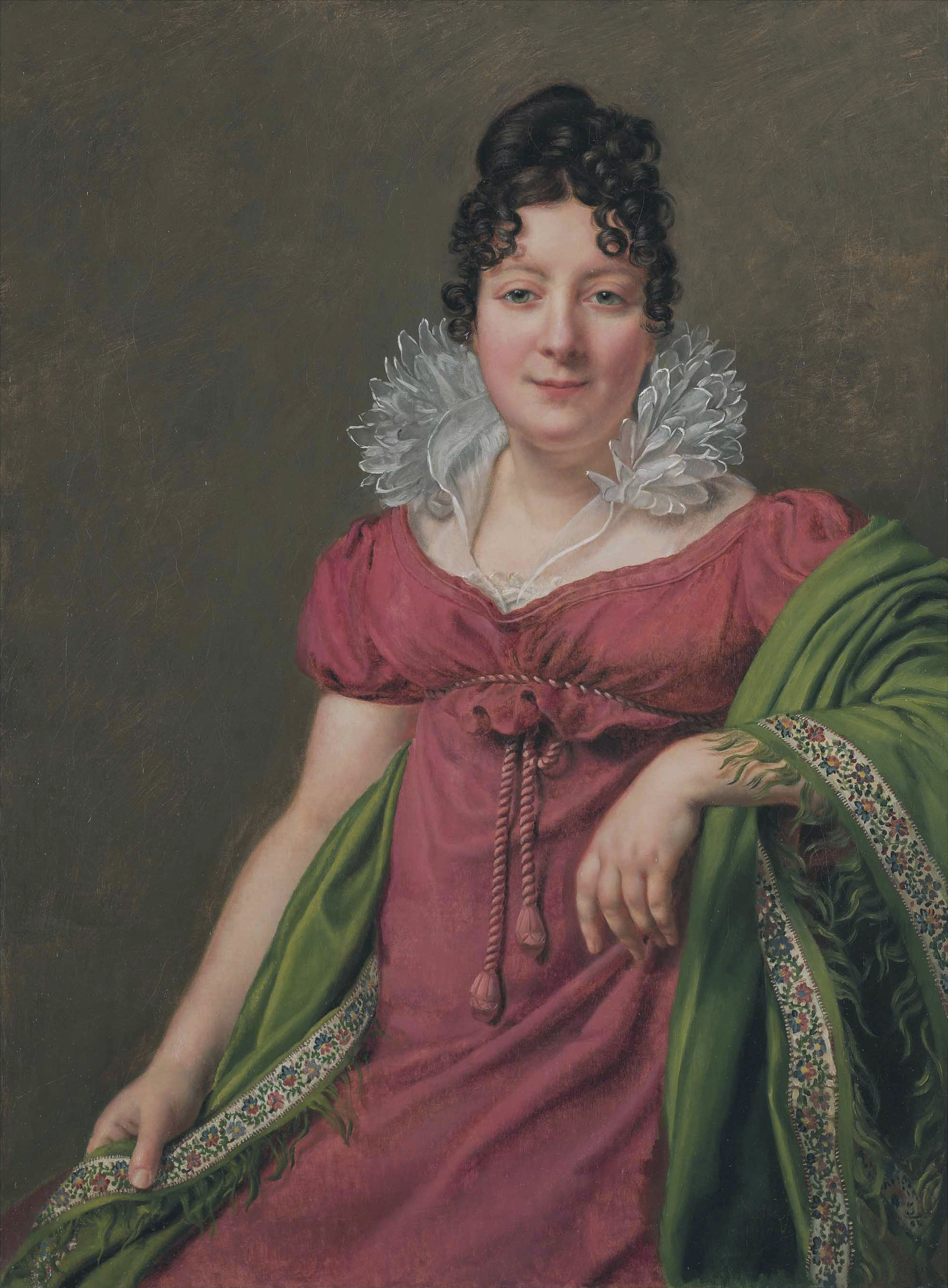
- Marie-Thérèse-Étiennette Bourgoin portrait by Henri-François Riesener
- Born: July 4, 1781; Paris, France
- Died: August 11, 1833 (aged 52); Paris, France
- Resting place: Père Lachaise Cemetery
- Occupation: Actress
- Years active: 1799–1829
- Known for: Performances at Comédie-Française, affair with Alexander I
- Notable work: Iphigénie, The Marriage of Figaro, Eugénie, Nanina, Zénobie
- Partner: Alexander I

Marie-Thérèse-Etiennette Bourgoin (1781–1833) was a French stage actress who performed at the Comédie-Française in Paris. She was known for her beauty and acting talent. Bourgoin had an affair with Russian Emperor Alexander I after being sent to entertain his delegation in Erfurt by Napoleon Bonaparte.

== Early life and career ==
Bourgoin was born on July 4, 1781, in Paris to a master shoemaker. She dreamed of the stage from early childhood, studying dance from age six and later acting. Her professional debut came at age 18 on September 13, 1799, at the Théâtre-Français in Paris.

Over the next three decades, Bourgoin performed over 50 roles at the Comédie-Française. She was inducted as the 213th member in 1802 and departed in 1829. Some of her most acclaimed roles were in productions of plays by Molière, Jean Racine, Pierre de Beaumarchais, and Voltaire. This included parts such as Iphigénie in Iphigénie, Cherubino in The Marriage of Figaro, Célimène in The Misanthrope, and the title role in Eugénie.

=== Affair with Alexander I ===
In 1808, Napoleon brought a troupe of actors including Bourgoin to Erfurt, Germany to entertain Alexander I and the Russian delegation to the Congress of Erfurt. Alexander was especially fond of Bourgoin's performances. At Napoleon's urging, she traveled back to the Russian Empire with Alexander.

Bourgoin made her St. Petersburg debut on July 26, 1809, starring in the comedy Nanina by Voltaire. She was a sensation with Russian audiences over the next two years. Bourgoin is believed to have become Alexander I's mistress during this period before returning to her acting career in Paris.

== Theatre ==
=== Career at the Comédie-Française ===
Year	Play	Role
1799	Fénelon by Gabriel-Marie Legouvé	Amélie
1799	Iphigénie by Jean Racine	Iphigénie
1801	Mélanie ou la Religieuse by Jean-François de La Harpe	Mélanie
1801	Mithridate by Jean Racine	Monime
1802	Isule et Orovèse by Népomucène Lemercier	Egésile
1802	The Guilty Mother by Beaumarchais	
1802	The Marriage of Figaro by Beaumarchais	
1802	Phèdre by Jean Racine	Aricie
1802	Tartuffe by Molière	Mariane
1803	Le Veuf amoureux by Jean-François Collin d'Harleville	Euphrosine
1803	The Three Sultans or Suleiman II by Charles-Simon Favart	Roxelane
1803	Melpomène et Thalie by René de Chazet	Mercure
1803	Siri-Brahé ou les Curieuses by Henry Joseph Thurind de Ryss	Julie Guldenstern
1803	Andromache by Jean Racine	Andromache
1803	Bajazet by Jean Racine	Atalide
1803	Britannicus by Jean Racine	Junie
1804	William the Conqueror by Alexandre Duval	
1804	Les Deux Figaro by Honoré-Antoine Richaud-Martelly	Inès
1804	La Leçon conjugale by Charles-Augustin Sewrin and René de Chazet	Suzanne
1805	Auguste et Théodore by Ernest de Manteufel	Théodore
1805	Les Plaideurs by Jean Racine	Isabelle
1805	Anaximander by François Andrieux	Phrosine
1805	Esther by Jean Racine	Zarès
1806	Athalie by Jean Racine	Zacharie
1806	Antiochus Epiphanes by Auguste Le Chevalier	Zobeide
1806	The Misanthrope by Molière	
1807	Pyrrhus ou les Aeacides by Louis-Grégoire Le Hoc	Iphise
1808	Plautus ou la Comédie latine by Népomucène Lemercier	Thalia
1808	The Family Assembly by François-Louis Riboutté	Rosine
1810	Eugénie by Beaumarchais	Eugénie
1810	Athalie by Jean Racine	Salomith
1811	A Tomorrow of Fortune or the Embarrassments of Happiness by Louis-Benoît Picard	Claire
1811	La Femme misanthrope ou le Spite d'amour by Alexandre Duval	Pauline
1812	Mascarille ou la Soeur supposée after Jean de Rotrou adapted by Charles Maurice	Angélique
1812	The Marriage of Figaro by Beaumarchais	
1812	La Lecture de Clarisse by François Roger	Flamette
1813	Tippo-Saëb by Étienne de Jouy	Aldéïr
1813	Ninus II by Charles Briffaut	Zorame
1813	The Supposed Niece by Eugène de Planard	Laure
1813	Tom Jones à Londres by Desforges	Sophie
1814	Fouquet by J. R. de Gain-Montagnac	Mademoiselle de Nollan
1814	The Barber of Seville by Beaumarchais	
1815	Les Deux voisines by Marc-Antoine-Madeleine Désaugiers and Michel-Joseph Gentil de Chavagnac	Julie
1816	Henri IV and Mayenne by Rancé and Thauélon de Lambert	Annette
1816	La Comédienne by François Andrieux	Henriette
1816	Alexandre et Apelle by Alexandre-Jean-Joseph de La Ville de Mirmont	Eudore
1816	Charlemagne by Népomucène Lemercier	Hugues
1816	La Pensée d'un bon roi by Jean-Baptiste Dubois	Victorine
1816	La Fête de Henri IV by Michel-Nicolas Balisson de Rougemont	Pauline
1816	L'Anniversaire ou Une journée by Philippe-Auguste de Rancé and Théaulon de Rambert	Gabrielle
1816	L'Artisan politique by Théodore-Henri Barrau	Rose
1817	Le Faux Bonhomme by Népomucène Lemercier	Ursule
1818	La Reconciliation par ruse by François-Louis Riboutté	Rose
1818	The Marriage of Figaro by Beaumarchais	
1818	Le Susceptible par honneur by Étienne Gosse	Alphonsine
1818	The Misanthrope by Molière	Célimène
1819	Hécube et Polyxène by Pierre-François-Xavier Bourguignon d'Herbigny	Polyxène
1819	The Marriage of Figaro by Beaumarchais	
1819	Le Frondeur by Jacques-Corentin Royou	Julie
1820	Le Flatterteur by Étienne Gosse	Rose
1821	Zénobie by Jacques-Corentin Royou	Thanis
1821	Le Faux bonhomme by Alexandre Duval	Sophie
1821	L'Heureux rencontre by Eugène de Planard	Émilie
1821	Faliero by Étienne Gosse	Angéline
1821	Les Plaideurs sans procès by Charles-Guillaume Étienne	Jenny
1822	Le Ménage de Molière by Justin Gensoul and J. A. N. Naudet	Henriette
1822	Clytemnestra by Alexandre Soumet	Electra
1823	La Route de Bordeaux by Marc-Antoine Désaugiers, Michel-Joseph Gentil de Chavagnac and Gersain	Émilie
1825	La Correspondance d'Alexandrine-Sophie de Bawr	Mademoiselle d'Ermance
1825	Bélisaire by Étienne de Jouy	Eudoxe
1825	Sigismond de Bourgogne by Jean-Pons-Guillaume Viennet	Sidonie
1826	L'Amitié des deux âges by Henri Monier de La Sizeranne	Amélie
1826	Rosemonde by François Paul Émile Boisnormand de Bonnechose	Rosemonde
1826	Marcel by Michel-Nicolas Balisson de Rougemont	Marie

== Later stage roles and death ==
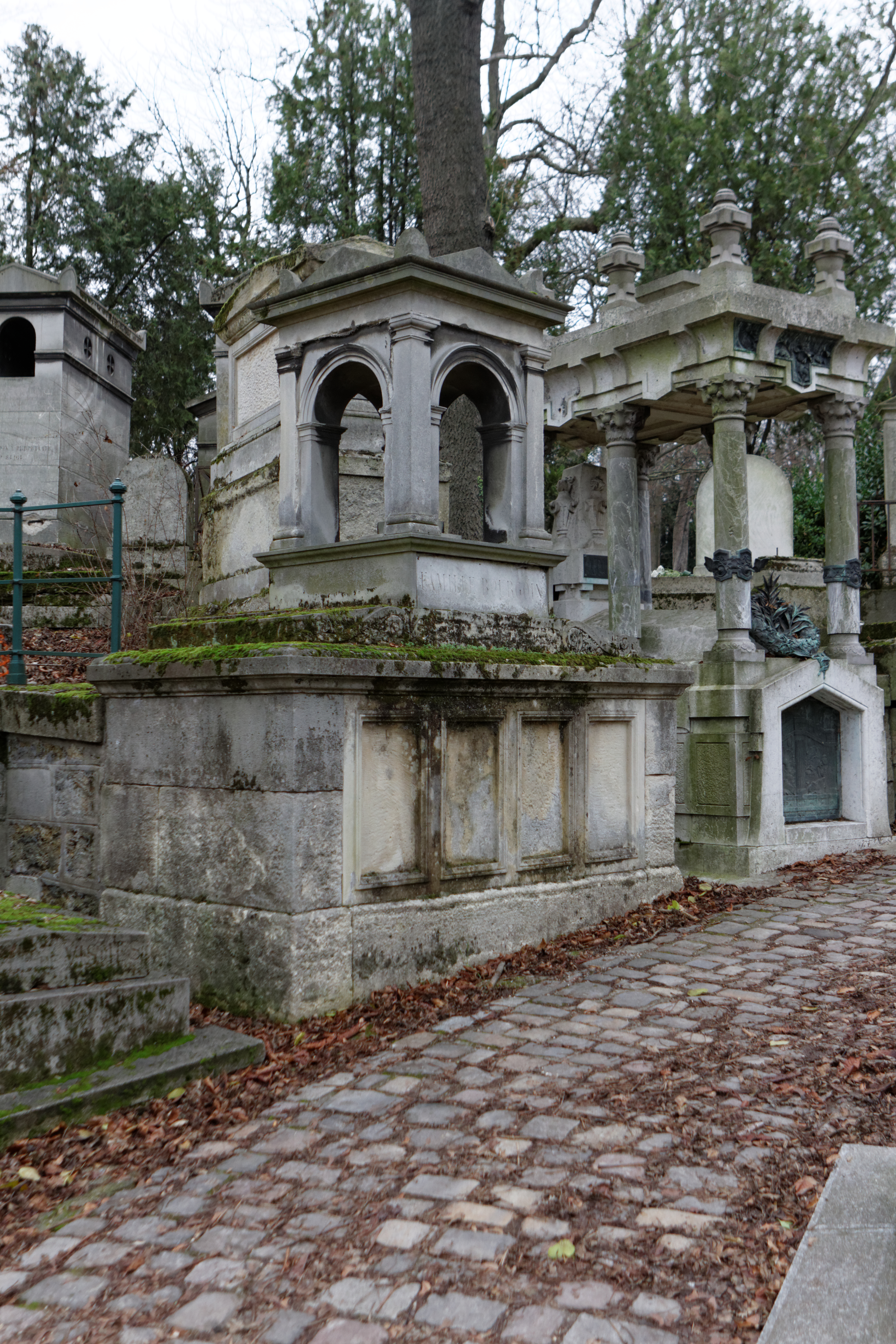
Grave in the Père-Lachaise cemetery.

Upon returning to the Comédie-Française, Bourgoin continued performing lead roles into the 1820s. Some of her last acclaimed parts were in The Marriage of Figaro (1819), Zénobie (1821), and Marcel (1826).

After a 34-year stage career, Bourgoin died in her native Paris on August 11, 1833, at age 52. She was buried at Père Lachaise Cemetery. Over three decades at the Comédie-Française, Bourgoin performed over 50 roles showcasing her talents as one of the leading actresses of her era.
