= Ekaterina Orlova (courtier) =

Russian courtier (1758–1781)

Her Serene Highness Ekaterina Nikolaevna Orlova
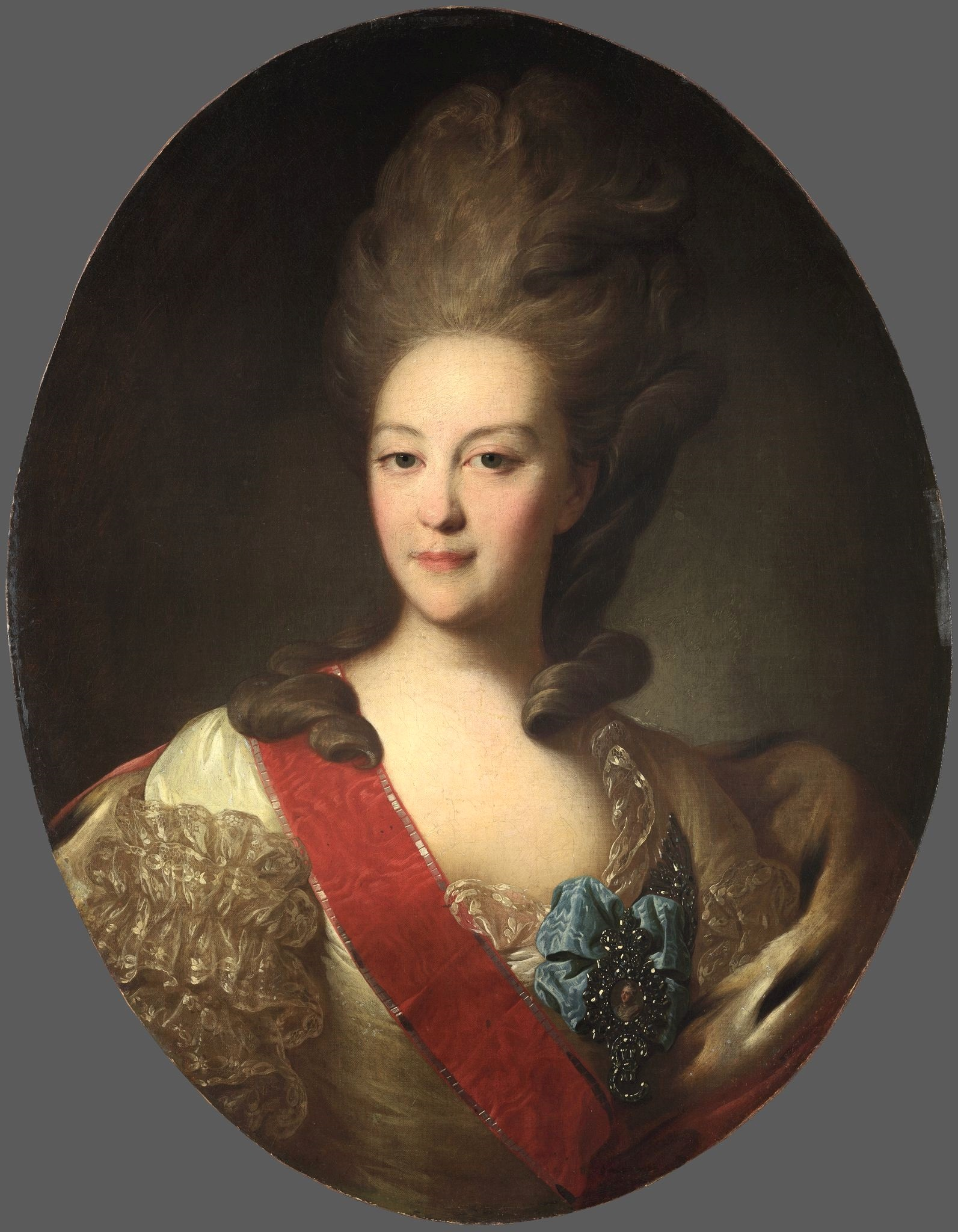
- Portrait by Fyodor Rokotov, 1779
- Born: Ekaterina Nikolaevna Zinovieva; 30 December 1758
- Died: 27 June 1781 (aged 22); Lausanne
- Buried: Annunciation Church of the Alexander Nevsky Lavra
- Noble family: Zinoviev
- Spouse: Grigory Orlov
- Father: Nikolai Ivanovich Zinoviev
- Mother: Evdokia Naumovna Senyavina

Princess Ekaterina Nikolaevna Orlova (born Zinovieva; 30 December 1758 – 27 June 1781) (Note: Old Style dates (19 December 1758 – 16 June 1781)) was a Russian courtier. She served as a lady-in-waiting to Empress Catherine the Great from 1773–1777, and in 1777 married her cousin Grigory Orlov, a favourite of Catherine II.

== Biography ==
Ekaterina was born to Major General Nikolai Ivanovich Zinoviev, who served as chief commandant of the Peter and Paul Fortress under Catherine II, and his wife Evdokia Naumovna (née Senyavina), daughter of Naum Senyavin, a vice admiral. She had five older brothers Andrei (1740s–?), Ivan (1740s–1810), Pytor (1740s–?), Alexander (c. 1749 – 1824), and Vasili (11 December 1755 – 19 January 1827). She spent her youth at the family estate in Konkovo.

Her father's sister Lukerya Ivanovna Orlova was the mother of prominent statesmen Grigory Orlov and Alexei Orlov.

=== Orlov's guardianship ===
In 1773, her father died and Ekaterina inherited the family estate in Konkovo at the age of 15. Grigory Orlov subsequently took care of her and the estate. The next year, following the rise of Potemkin, Orlov travelled abroad and engaged in revelry, during which time Catherine II wished to purchase the estate in an attempt to either support her former favourite, or to separate the couple, ensuring that Grigory would return to his Neskuchnoye estate nearby.

When Ekaterina came to court, she was distinguished by her appearance and sweet disposition, as noted by the empress in a playful note which promised "death from laughter", though she soon became a "victim to court morals". According to Mikhail Shcherbatov, Orlov had raped Ekaterina at the age of 13 and had made no attempts to keep it from the court.

She was not only infatuated with Grigory, but also with his son by the empress, Alexei Bobrinsky, who was only four years younger than her. The empress wrote to Potemkin:

Little Bobrinsky says that Katenka has more intelligence than all the other women and girls in the city. They wanted to know what he based his opinion on. He said that, in his opinion, this was proved only by the fact that she was less reddened and adorned with jewels than others. At the opera, he planned to break the bars in his box, because it prevented him from seeing Katenka and being seen by her; Finally, I don't know how, he managed to enlarge one of the cells of the grid, and then goodbye opera, he paid no more attention. Yesterday he defended himself like a lion from Prince Orlov, who wanted to take him for his passion: he answered him in the end with such intelligence that he silenced him, because he told him that Katenka "was not all his cousin".

In the summer of 1776, it was rumoured in secular circles that Ekaterina had fallen pregnant by Prince Orlov, and that he gave her 100 thousand rubles, and the same number of precious stones. In September of that year Orlov and Zinovieva travelled to France. In October, it was rumoured they would be married despite the Russian Orthodox Church prohibiting marriages between first cousins. The child that Ekaterina was allegedly carrying was thought to have been stillborn.

=== Marriage ===
The following year, Grigory and Ekaterina were married in the Church of the Ascension of Christ in the Koporsky district of Saint Petersburg. He was 43, she was 18. In February 1777 at court they were considered to already have been married, although the ceremony took place on 5 June. The court was indignant at such a marriage, and Swedish King Gustav III is thought to have intercepted on behalf of Ekaterina. This matter was discussed in the Senate, which determined the couple should be separated and both be sent to monasteries.

The synod brought an official complaint to the Empress, however the background of the case was not a moral and religious one, but political: Orlov had fallen from favour and was engaged in conflict with Catherine II at the time, due to the empress not allowing Ekaterina to travel with her to Tsarskoye Selo; Grigory argued with the empress, and when she did not change her mind, Orlov is said to have uttered the words "Damn you completely". Despite this and the public opinion of the marriage, and the Synod, the Empress appealed the decision of the Senate, made Princess Orlova a Fraulein, and gave her a portrait of herself, among other gifts. On 22 September 1777, she was awarded the Order of Saint Catherine. This caused a great sensation within the court.

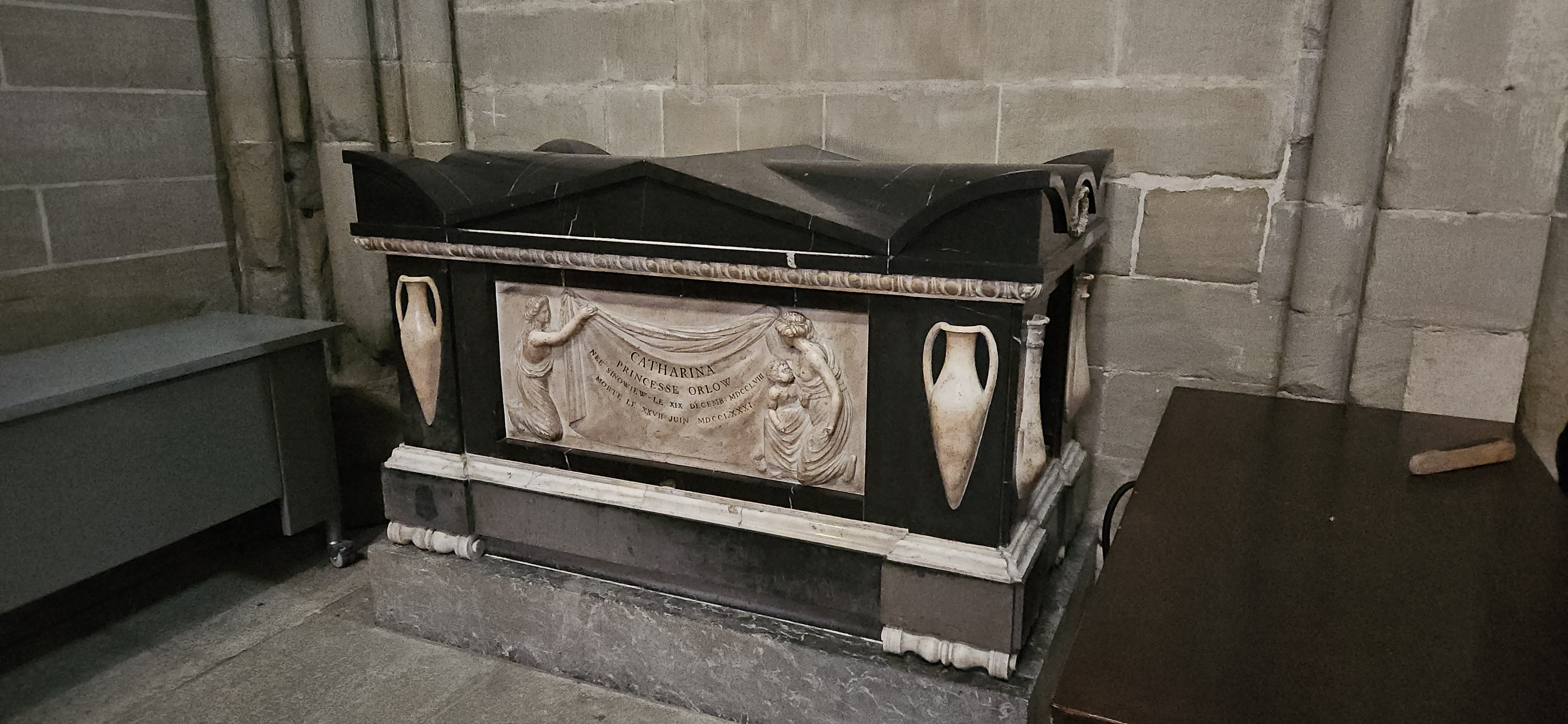
Princess Ekaterina Orlova cenotaph in Lausanne Cathedral/Switzerland.

The couple honeymooned in Switzerland, then returned to St. Petersburg for two years. When Ekaterina fell ill they returned to Switzerland where, at the age of 22, she died of tuberculosis. She was buried in Lausanne Cathedral, before her body was transported to Russia and buried on the grounds of the Alexander Nevsky Monastery in the Annunciation Church. Ekaterina's death had a severe effect on her widower, who appears to have suffered from a serious mental illness, thought to be a form of dementia, losing his speech and mind. He soon died on 13 April 1783 at his Neskuchnoye estate. Her death also affected her brother Vasili, who abruptly changed his life, retreating from society before traveling abroad and joining a masonic lodge. Nikolay Karamzin, a friend of Vasili's, visited Switzerland in the September of 1789 and had a tombstone placed for her, writing:

This minute I came from the cathedral church. There, a monument to Princess Orlova was built of black marble, who, in her blooming youth, died her days in Lausanne, in the arms of a tender, inconsolable husband. They say that she was beautiful – beautiful and sensitive!
