= Rabbi Tarfon =

Late 1st/early 2nd century Jewish rabbi and sage

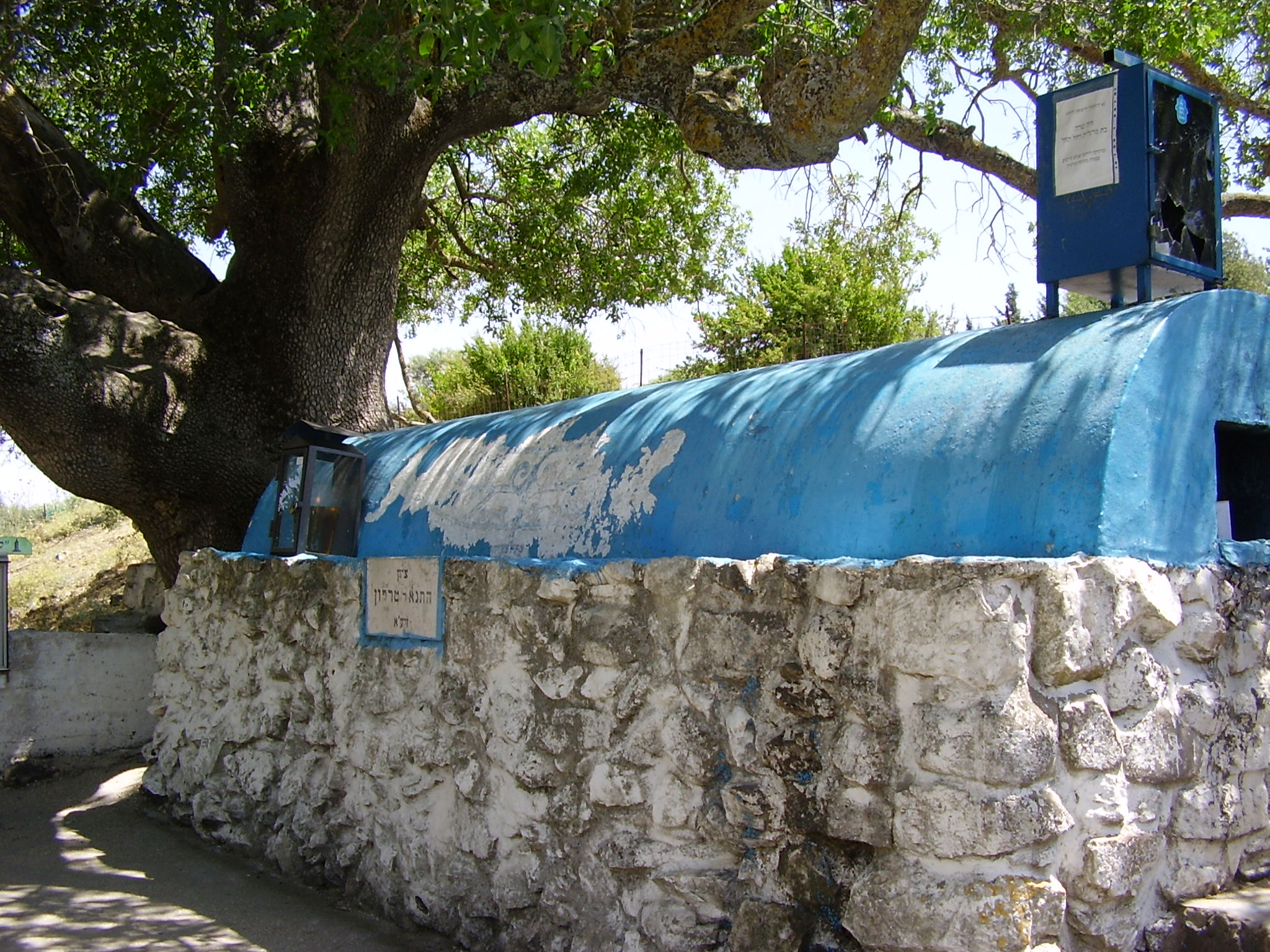
Rabbi Tarfon's grave in Kadita, Upper Galilee

Rabbi Tarfon or Tarphon (Hebrew: רבי טרפון, from the Greek Τρύφων Tryphon literally "one who lives in luxury" Trifon), a Kohen, was a member of the third generation of the Mishnah sages, who lived in the period between the destruction of the Second Temple (70 CE) and the fall of Betar (135 CE).

== Biography ==
Rabbi Tarfon was a resident of Yavneh, but Jewish sources show that he also lived and taught in Lod. He was of priestly lineage, and he once went with his uncle on his mother's side to participate in the priestly prayer in the Temple in Jerusalem. As a priest, he would demand the terumah even after the Temple had fallen, but his generosity made him return the money given to him as a priest in the pidyon haben ceremony. Once, in a time of famine, he took 300 wives so that they might, as wives of a priest, exercise the right of sharing in the tithes. Once, when from his window he saw a bridal procession evidently of the poorer classes, he requested his mother and sister to anoint the bride that the groom might find more joy in her. His devotion to his mother was such that he used to place his hands beneath her feet when she was obliged to cross the courtyard barefoot.

Although wealthy, he possessed extraordinary modesty; in one instance he deeply regretted having mentioned his name in a time of peril, since he feared that in using his position as teacher to escape from danger he had seemingly violated the rule against utilizing knowledge of the Torah for practical ends.

When Eliezer ben Hyrcanus was sick, and a deputation was sent to him, Tarfon acted as the spokesman, addressing him as follows: "Master, you are worth more to Israel than the sun, for that gives light only on earth, while you shed your rays both in this world and in the world to come". Similarly, he led a number of scholars in a visit to R. Ishmael ben Elisha, upon the death of Ishmael's sons; and when Jose the Galilean, Tarfon, Eleazar ben Azariah, and Rabbi Akiva assembled to decide on the disputed sayings of Eliezer ben Hyrcanus, Tarfon was the first speaker. He was one of those whose names occurred in the deposition of Gamaliel II, and it is expressly stated that he was addressed as "brother" by the other scholars.

On festivals and holy days, he was accustomed to delight his wife and children by preparing for them the finest fruits and dainties. When he wished to express approval of anyone, he would say, "'A knob and a flower': you have spoken as beautifully as the adornments of the candlestick in the Temple"; but when it was necessary to upbraid another, he would say, "'My son shall not go down with you'". When he perceived that his two nephews, whom he was instructing personally, were becoming careless, he interrupted his lecture and regained their attention by saying, "Then again Abraham took a wife, and her name was Johanna" whereupon his pupils interrupted him by exclaiming, "No, Keturah!" His students included R. Judah, Simeon Shezuri, and Judah ben Isaiah ha-Bosem.

He is mentioned in the traditional Haggadah of Passover in the company of other sages: "It happened that Rabbi Eliezer, Rabbi Yehoshua, Rabbi Elazar ben Azariah, Rabbi Akiva, and Rabbi Tarfon were reclining (at a seder) in Bnei Barak (in Israel) and were telling of the exodus from Egypt the entire night..."

Opinions differ regarding his death. According to Eichah Rabbah he became one of the Ten Martyrs, but others believe that he fled the country upon the outbreak of the Bar Kochba revolt and died elsewhere. According to a tradition from the Arizal, his grave is located in Kadita under a giant pistachio tree. However, a burial cave was recently discovered on Mount Meron and restored by the "Ohalei Tzaddikim" organization, which claims Tarfon was buried there. Elsewhere, an ossuary from a burial cave in Jerusalem has been discovered that is marked in Aramaic, "Elisheba wife of Tarfon."

== Teachings ==
=== Halacha ===
He was an adherent of the school of Shammai. However, only rarely is he recorded as following its teachings, and he always inclined toward leniency in the interpretation of those halakhot of Shammai which had not actually been put into practice; often he decided in direct opposition to the followers of Shammai when they imposed restrictions of excessive severity. In his view, "objective views are always the determinative criterion in reaching legal decisions. He consistently decides to the advantage of the priest, and also encourages the performance of rituals in which the priest occupies the central role."

He was also the author of independent halakhot, one being on the wording of the blessing after drinking water, and another on a blessing recited at the Passover Seder. The majority of his rulings, however, deal with subjects discussed in the orders Nashim, Ḳodashim, Tohorot, and Nezikin. In those found in Tohorot his tendency is always toward severity, while in Neziḳin are found his sayings on lost objects and usufruct, the payment of debts, the money due a woman when she receives a bill of divorce, and damage caused by cattle. If he had belonged to the Sanhedrin, the death-penalty would have been effectively abolished. He engaged in halakhic disputes with Rabbi Akiva (however, the two agreed with regard to a tosefta), with Shimon bar Yochai, and R. Eleazar ben Azaryah. Other sayings of R. Tarfon have been preserved which were accepted without controversy. He is mentioned briefly with regard to Bruriah.

=== Aggadah ===
He was accustomed to open his aggadic discourses with a halakhic question.

In the discussion as to the relative importance of theory and practice, Tarfon decided in favor of the latter.

In his upper chamber at Jabneh, it was decided that benevolence should be practiced according to Psalms 106:3.

He held that God did not allow His glory to overshadow Israel until the people had fulfilled a task.

=== Quotes ===
- The day is short, and the labor is plenty; the laborers are slothful, while the reward is great, and the master of the house is pressing.
- You are not obliged to complete the work, but neither are you free to desist from it; if you have learned much Torah, great shall be your reward, for He who hires you will surely repay you for your toil; yet the requital of the pious is in the future.
- No man dies except through idleness.

=== Attitude towards Christianity ===
R. Tarfon, as quoted in the Tosefta and Talmud, swore that he would burn scrolls (either gilyonim or Torah scrolls) that came into his possession which were written by a heretical scribe, even if the name of God occurred in them. This is the strictest opinion given in the passage; Rabbi Yose said to cut out and bury the names of God while burning the rest of the scroll, while the initial anonymous opinion says such texts may not be saved from a fire on Shabbat (in general, no books other than a valid Torah scroll may be saved from a fire on Shabbat) while saying nothing about burning in general. Scholars debate whether the word minim ("heretics") here refers to heretical Jews in general, or to a particular group of them, for example Jewish gnostics or Jewish Christians.

There is debate as to whether Justin Martyr's dialogue with Trypho should be taken as purporting to represent a dialog with Tarfon. The dialog itself has been held to be principally a literary device, and its claim to witness to a rabbinic perspective can be seen in that light.
