= Mistress (lover) =

Female who is in an extra-marital sexual relationship

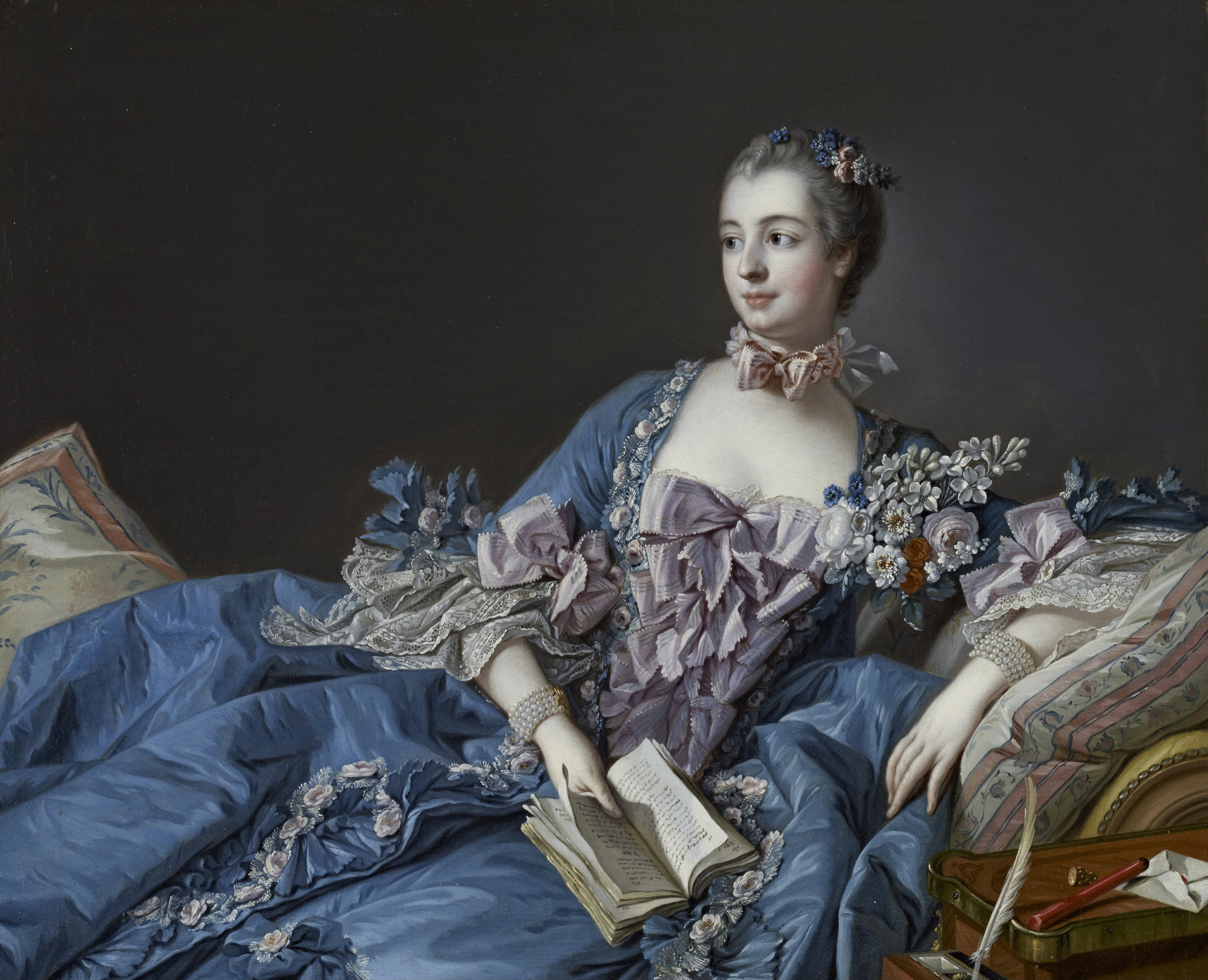
Madame de Pompadour, a mistress of Louis XV, c. 1756

A mistress or kept woman is a woman who is in a relatively long-term sexual and romantic relationship with a man who is married to a different person.

In the courts of Europe, particularly Versailles and Whitehall in the 17th and 18th centuries, royal mistresses often wielded great power and influence. A king might have numerous mistresses but have a single "favourite mistress" or "official mistress" (in French, maîtresse-en-titre), as with Louis XV and Madame de Pompadour. Other well-known royal mistresses include Agnès Sorel, Diane de Poitiers, Barbara Villiers, Nell Gwyn, and Madame de Montespan.

Defenders of the practice of mistresses referred to the practice in the ancient Near East of keeping a concubine; they frequently quoted verses from the Old Testament to show that mistress-keeping was an ancient practice that was, if not acceptable, at least understandable. With the Romantics of the early 19th century, some came to view the role as a sign of independence and defiance of middle-class morality, for example Mary Ann Evans, better known as George Eliot.

== Description ==
A mistress is usually in a long-term good relationship with a man who is married to someone else and is often referred to as "the other woman". Generally, the relationship is stable and at least semi-permanent, but the couple do not live together openly. The relationship is often, but not always, secret. There is often also the implication that the mistress is sometimes "kept" – i.e., her lover is paying all or some of her living expenses.

Historically the term "mistress" denoted a "kept woman", who was maintained in a comfortable, or even lavish, lifestyle by a wealthy man so that she would be available for his sexual pleasure. Such a woman could move between the roles of a mistress and a courtesan depending on her situation and environment, whereas the word "lover" was used when the illicit female partner was married to another man.

In modern contexts, the word "mistress" is used primarily to refer to the female lover, married or unmarried, of a married man, without the kept woman aspects. In the case of an unmarried man, "mistress" is not usually used. Instead, when the woman is unmarried, it is common to speak of a "girlfriend" or a "partner", and when the woman is married, she is called their "lover".

The term "mistress" was originally used as the feminine counterpart of "mister". In referring to those of higher social status, it meant the woman married to the owner, or renter, of the house, and was a term of deferential respect.

== History ==
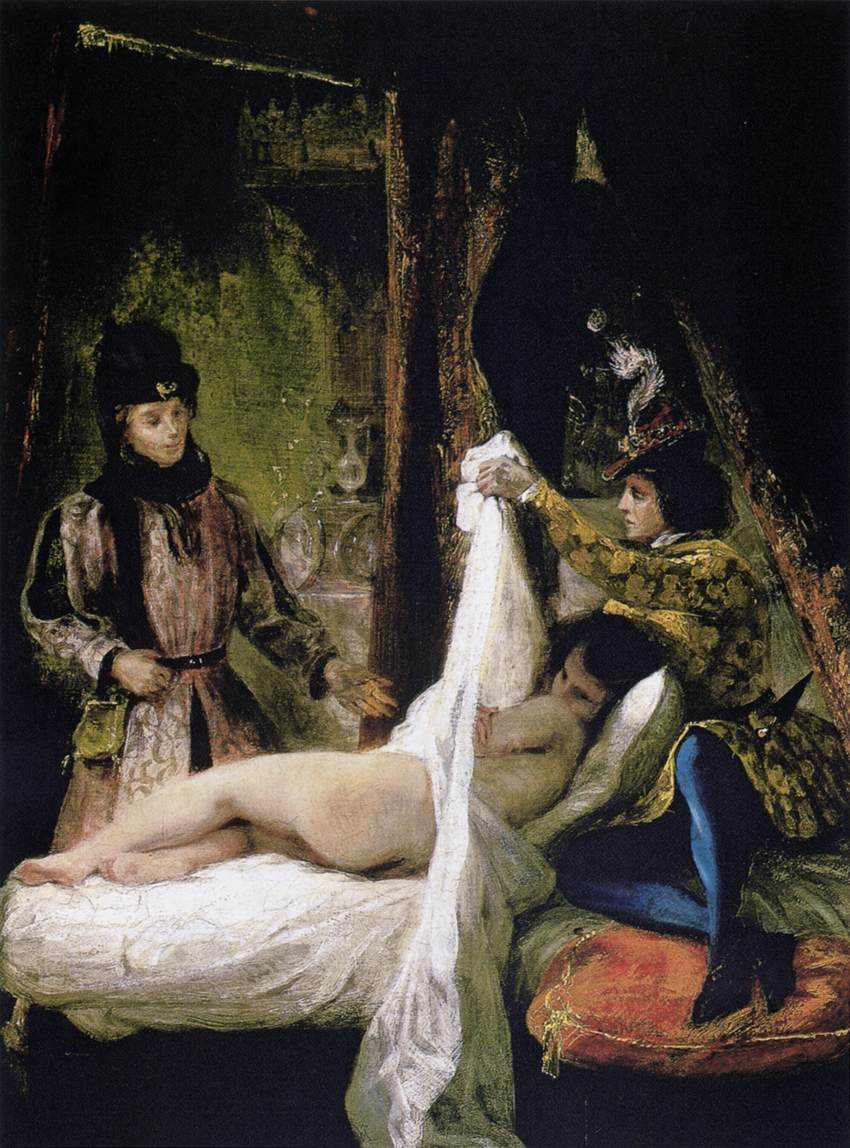
Eugène Delacroix's c. 1825 painting Louis d'Orléans Showing His Mistress

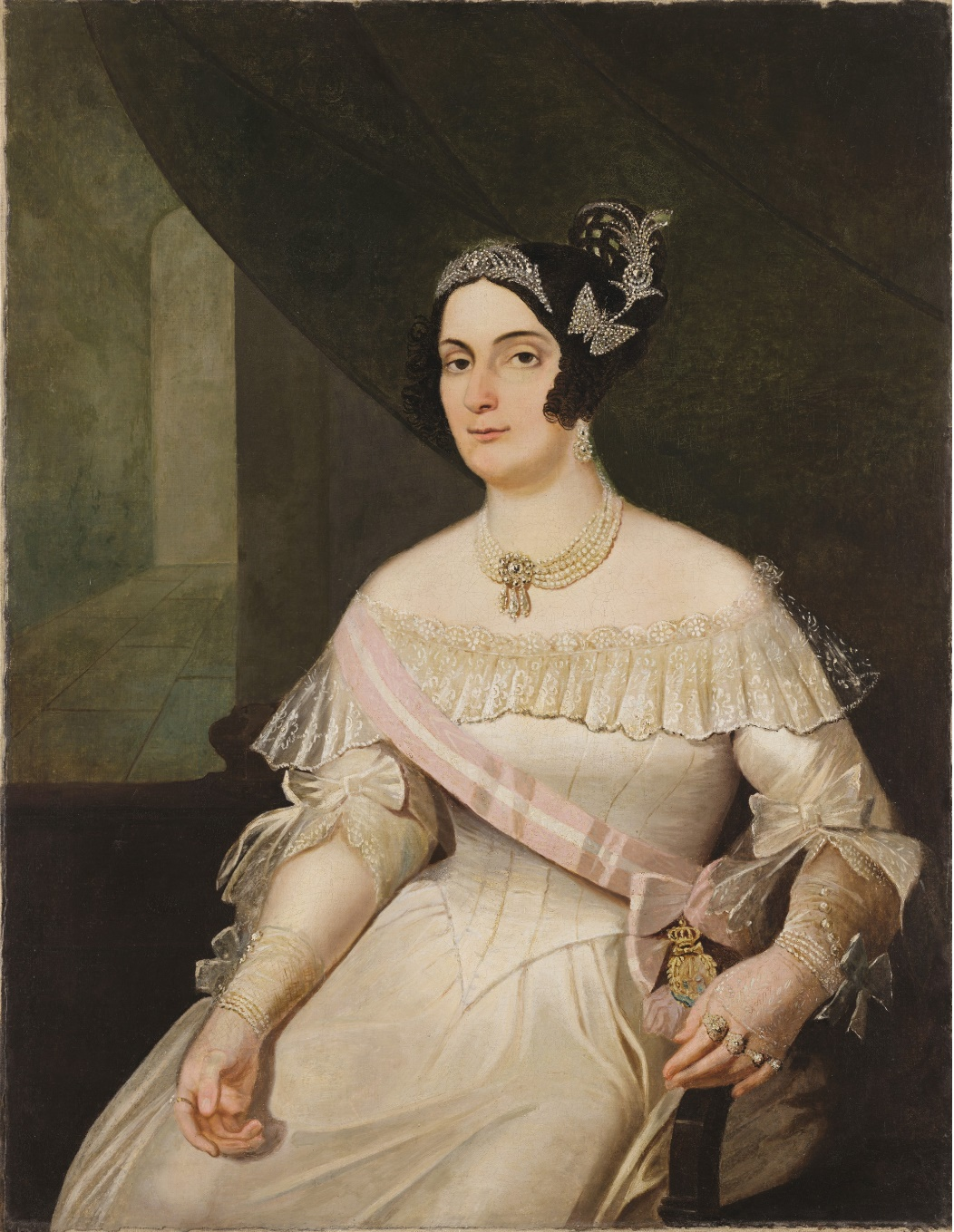
Domitila de Castro, long-term mistress of Emperor Pedro I of Brazil

The historically best known and most-researched mistresses are the royal mistresses of European monarchs, for example, Agnès Sorel, Diane de Poitiers, Barbara Villiers, Nell Gwyn, Madame de Montespan, and Madame de Pompadour. The keeping of a mistress in Europe was not confined to royalty and nobility, but permeated down through the social ranks, essentially to any man who could afford to do so. Any man who could afford a mistress could have one (or more), regardless of social position. A wealthy merchant or a young noble might have had a kept woman. Being a mistress was typically an occupation for a younger woman who, if she were fortunate, might go on to marry her lover or another man of rank.

The ballad "The Three Ravens" (published in 1611, but possibly older) extolls the loyal mistress of a slain knight, who buries her dead lover and then dies of the exertion, as she was in an advanced stage of pregnancy. The ballad-maker assigned this role to the knight's mistress ("leman" was the term common at the time) rather than to his wife.

In the courts of Europe, particularly Versailles and Whitehall in the 17th and 18th centuries, a mistress often wielded great power and influence. A king might have numerous mistresses but have a single "favourite mistress" or "official mistress" (in French, maîtresse-en-titre), as with Louis XV and Madame de Pompadour. The mistresses of both Louis XV (especially Madame de Pompadour) and Charles II were often considered to exert great influence over their lovers, the relationships being open secrets. Other than wealthy merchants and kings, Alexander VI is but one example of a Pope who kept mistresses. While the extremely wealthy might keep a mistress for life (as George II of Great Britain did with "Mrs Howard", even after they were no longer romantically linked), such was not the case for most kept women.

In 1736, when George II was newly ascendant, Henry Fielding (in Pasquin) has his Lord Place say, "[...] but, miss, every one now keeps and is kept; there are no such things as marriages now-a-days, unless merely Smithfield contracts, and that for the support of families; but then the husband and wife both take into keeping within a fortnight".

Occasionally the mistress is in a superior position both financially and socially to her lover. As a widow, Catherine the Great was known to have been involved with several successive men during her reign; but, like many powerful women of her era, in spite of being a widow free to marry, she chose not to share her power with a husband, preferring to maintain absolute power alone.

In literature, D. H. Lawrence's 1928 novel Lady Chatterley's Lover portrays a situation where a woman becomes the mistress of her husband's gamekeeper. Until recently, a woman's taking a socially inferior lover was considered much more shocking than the reverse situation.

=== 20th century ===
As divorce became more socially acceptable, it was easier for men to divorce their wives and marry the women who, in earlier years, might have been their mistresses. The practice of having a mistress continued among some married men, especially the wealthy. Occasionally, men married their mistresses. Sacha Guitry declared, "When you marry your mistress, you create a job vacancy".

== In literature ==
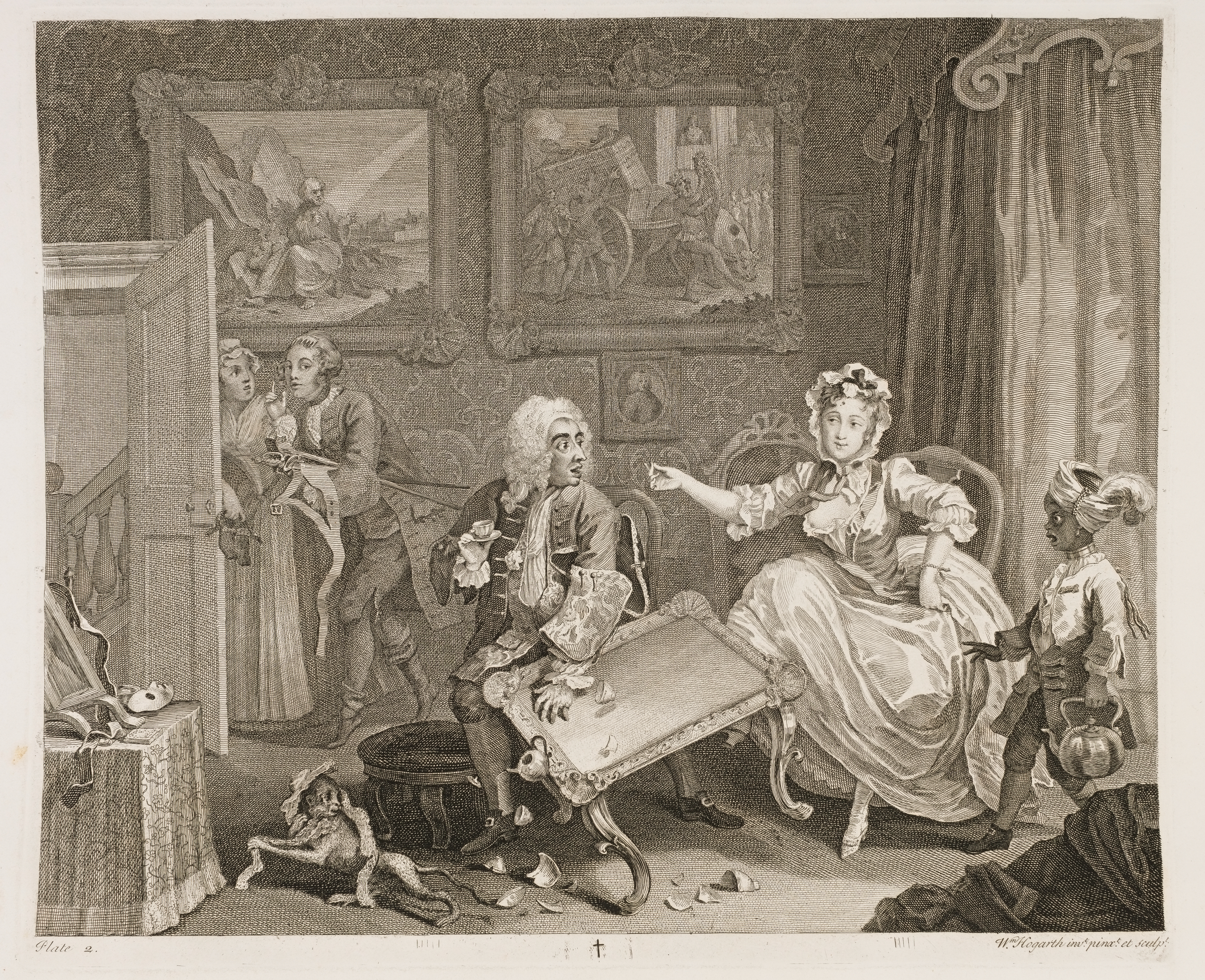
William Hogarth's A Harlot's Progress, plate 2, from 1731 showing Moll Hackabout as a mistress

In both John Cleland's 1748 novel Fanny Hill and Daniel Defoe's 1722 Moll Flanders, as well as in countless novels of feminine peril, the distinction between a "kept woman" and a prostitute is all-important.

Defenders of the practice of mistresses referred to the practice in the ancient Near East of keeping a concubine; they frequently quoted verses from the Old Testament to show that mistress-keeping was an ancient practice that was, if not acceptable, at least understandable. John Dryden, in Annus Mirabilis (poem), suggested that the king's keeping of mistresses and production of bastards was a result of his abundance of generosity and spirit. In its more sinister form, the theme of being "kept" is never far from the surface in novels about women as victims in the 18th century in England, whether in the novels of Eliza Haywood or Samuel Richardson (whose heroines in Pamela and Clarissa are both put in a position of being threatened with sexual degradation and being reduced to the status of a kept object).

With the Romantics of the early 19th century, the subject of "keeping" becomes more problematic, in that a non-marital sexual union can occasionally be celebrated as a woman's free choice and a noble alternative. Mary Ann Evans (better known as George Eliot) defiantly lived "in sin" with a married man, partially as a sign of her independence of middle-class morality. Her independence required that she not be "kept".

== See also ==
- Sugar baby
- Alienation of affections
- Cicisbeo
- Concubinage
- English royal mistress
- French royal mistresses
- Russian royal mistresses
- Polygyny threshold model
