= Alexander Vasilchikov =

Russian aristocrat

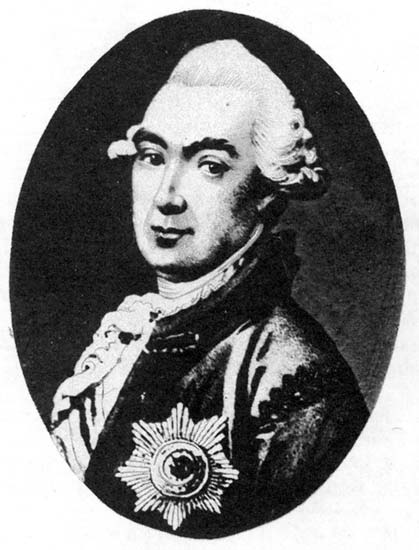
Portrait of Vasilchikov

Alexander Semyonovich Vasilchikov (Russian: Александр Семёнович Васильчиков, tr. Aleksandr Semënovič Vasil'čikov; 1746–1813) was a Russian aristocrat who became the lover of Catherine the Great from 1772 to 1774.

Vasilchikov was an ensign in the Chevalier Guard Regiment when he was noted by Catherine and was appointed gentleman of the bedchamber on 1 August 1772. When Catherine's then-lover Grigory Grigoryevich Orlov left court, Catherine was informed about his adultery, and 12 August, Vasilchikov was made general aide-de-camp and lover of Catherine. Vasilchikov was expected to be available to attend on her at all times, and was not allowed to leave the palace without permission.

The relationship was short-lived. Catherine found Vasilchikov's gentleness cloying, saying "His tenderness made me weep." When Vasilchikov was away on a journey, sent by the empress, Grigory Potemkin replaced him as her lover. She wrote to her friend Friedrich Melchior, Baron von Grimm about Vasilchikov's dismissal: "Why do you reproach me because I dismiss a well-meaning but extremely boring bourgeois in favour of one of the greatest, the most comical and amusing, characters of this iron century?"

Vasilchikov later complained that he felt like a hired gigolo: "I was nothing more to her than a kind of male cocotte and I was treated as such. If I made a request for myself or anyone else, she did not reply, but the next day I found a bank-note for several thousand rubles in my pocket. She never condescended to discuss with me any matters that lay close to my heart."

Catherine characteristically rewarded her former lover richly. Vasilchikov was given a pension of twenty thousand rubles and valuable properties. He lived the rest of his life in Moscow. He never married. He built a notable collection of Western European paintings and sculptures, including a "Self Portrait" by Velasquez and works by Philips Wouwerman and Andries Botha.
