= Varvara Turkestanova =

Russian noblewoman

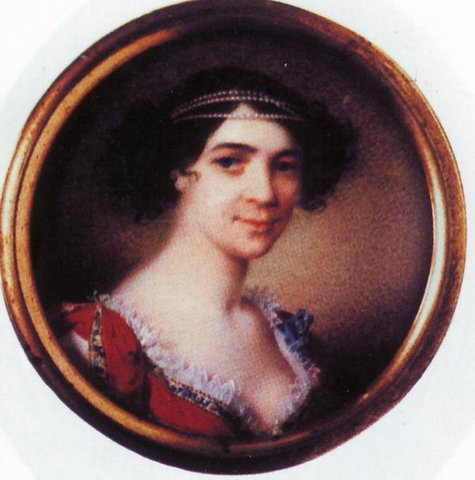
Varvara Turkestanova. Painting by Rossi, 1810s.

Princess Varvara Ilynichna Turkestanova (Russian: Варвара Ильинична Туркестанова; 26 December 1775 – 20 May 1819) was a Russian noblewoman of Georgian origin, known for her affair with Tsar Alexander I of Russia and her correspondence with the French émigré Ferdinand Christin, which describes the Russian court life of the 1810s. She took her own life shortly after giving birth to a daughter, whose father was either Tsar Alexander or her other lover, Prince Vladimir Golitsyn. Her surname is also transliterated in Western European languages as Tourkestanoff, Tourkestanov, or Tourkestanow.

== Life ==
Varvara Turkestanova, a third-generation émigré of Georgian noble descent, was part of the Turkestanishvili family, established in Russia in 1724. She was born in Moscow. Orphaned early in life, she was reared by her relative, General Vasily Arsenyev. Due to her charm and ingenuity, she gained popularity in the Muscovite high society. She later became a lady-in-waiting of the empress Maria Feodorovna, consort of Paul I and mother of Alexander I. She became close to the tsar Alexander I in the mid-1810s, during the temporary absence of his long-time favorite, Princess Maria Naryshkina, abroad. By 1818, Varvara had also been in relationship with Prince Vladimir Golitsyn, a son of Varvara Golitsyna and a man 18 years her junior.

In 1819, Varvara gave birth to a daughter, Maria, rumored to have been born of Tsar Alexander or Prince Golitsyn. Since Princess Turkestanova was unmarried, the news caused a scandal at court. In despair, Varvara ingested a fatal poison and died in St. Petersburg, tended by the empress Maria Feodorovna. The death was officially pronounced as related to cholera. She was buried at the Alexander Nevsky Lavra. Her daughter, Maria (also known as Mimi; 1819–1843), was reared by Prince Golitsyn and eventually married Ivan Nelidov, brother of Varvara Nelidova, mistress of Nicholas I of Russia.

Varvara Turkestanova's French-language correspondence with her friend, the Swiss–French émigré and diplomat in Russian service, Ferdinand Christin, from 1813 to 1816, details the Russian court life of the early 19th century and was published in Russkiy arkhiv (Русский архив) in 1882.
