= Grigory Orlov =

Russian noble (1734–1783)

His Serene Highness Grigory Orlov Prince
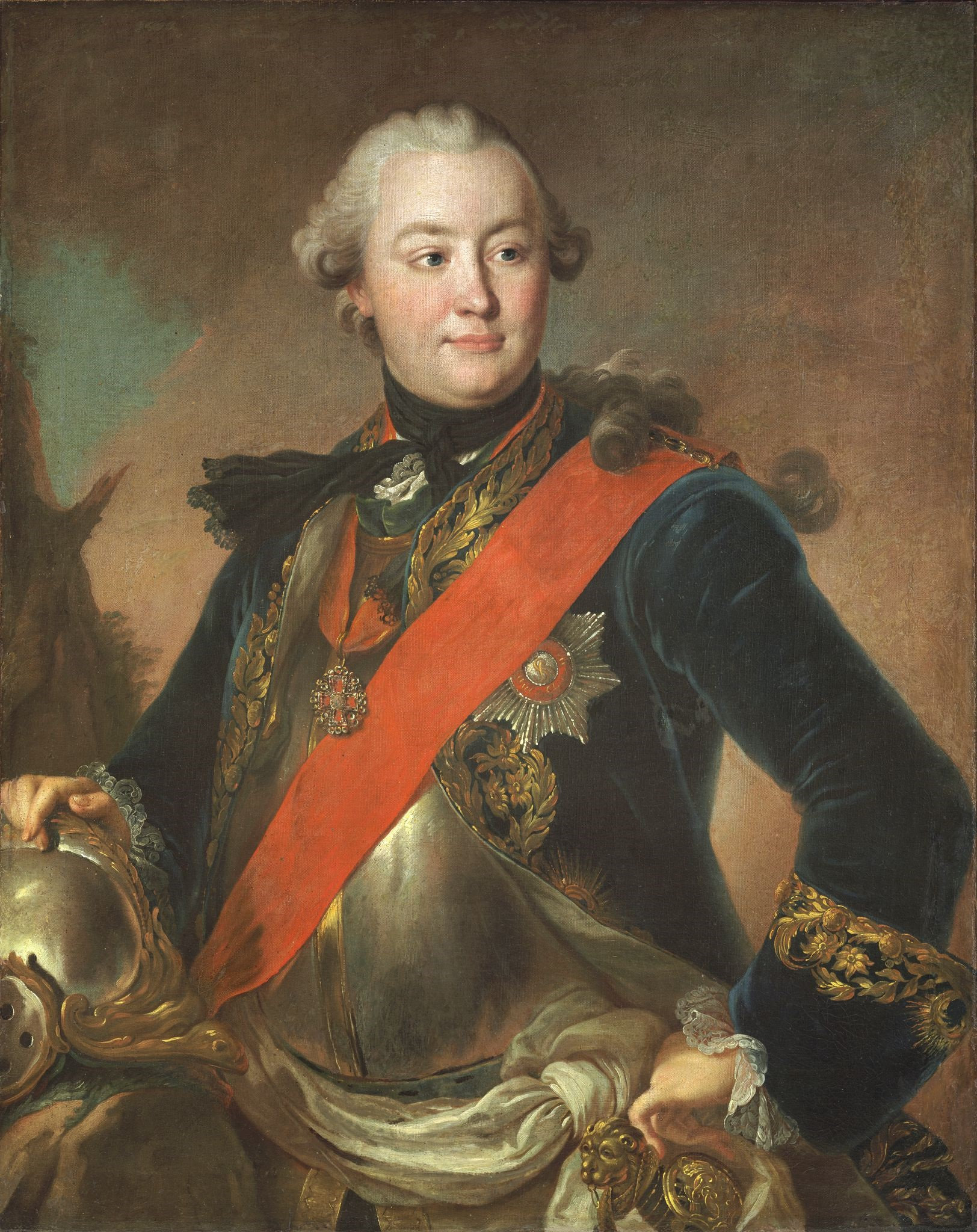
- Count Grigory Orlov, by Fyodor Rokotov

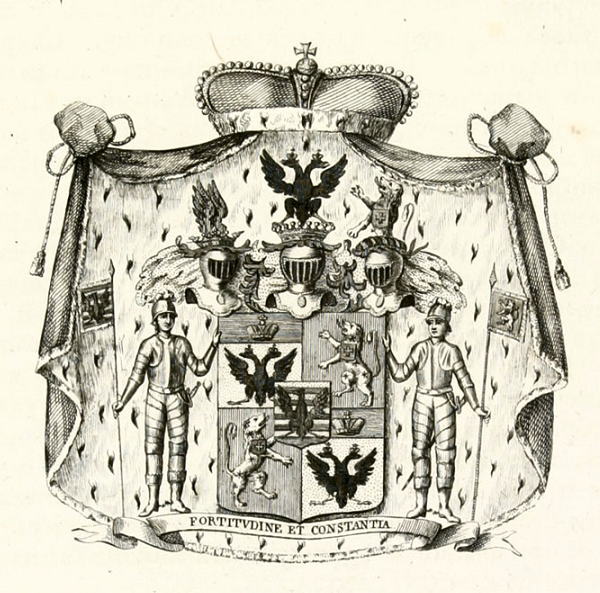
- Coat of arms
- Tenure: 1761 – 1772
- Full name: Grigory Grigoryevich Orlov
- Other titles: Count
- Known for: Overthrowing Peter III
- Born: October 17, 1734; Bezhetsky Uyezd, Tver Governorate, Russian Empire
- Died: April 24, 1783 (aged 48); Moscow, Moscow Governorate, Russian Empire
- Buried: Yuriev Monastery
- Residence: List of residences: – Estates in Kazan and Moscow governorates – Ropsha manor (since 1764) – Gatchina manor with villages (since 1765) – Lode Castle (since 1771)
- Noble family: Orlov
- Issue: Alexei Grigorievich Bobrinsky

Personal details
- Spouse: Ekaterina Nikolaevna Zinovieva
- Parents: Grigory Ivanovich Orlov (father); Lukerya Ivanovna Zinovieva (mother)
- Occupation: Statesman; Military leader; Patron
- Awards: Order of St. Alexander Nevsky (1762); Order of St. Andrew (1763); Order of St. Vladimir 1st class (1782)

Military service
- Allegiance: Russian Empire
- Branch/service: • Imperial Army
- Years of service: 1749 – 1783
- Rank: General-in-chief
- Commands: Izmailovsky Life Guards Regiment; Preobrazhensky Life Guards Regiment; Semyonovsky Life Guards Regiment; Life Guard Horse Regiment; Chevalier Guard Regiment
- Battles/wars: Seven Years' War; Battle of Zorndorf (WIA)

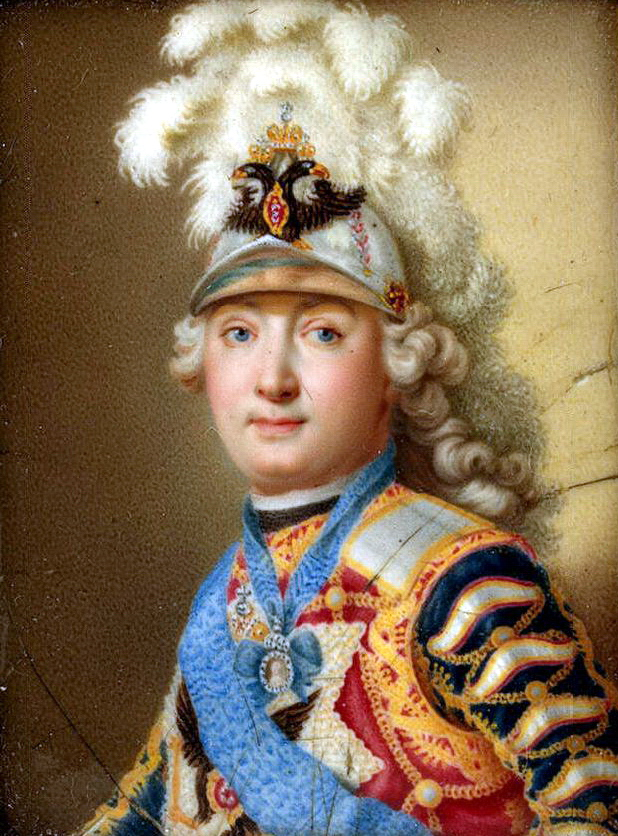
А. I. Chorny (Chernov). Portrait of Count G. G. Orlov. Hermitage Museum

Prince Grigory Grigoryevich Orlov (Russian: Григорий Григорьевич Орлов; 17 October 1734 – 24 April 1783 (Note: The dates are according to the New Style. In the Old Style it would be 6 October to 13 April of the same years.)) was a Russian general and patron of arts who was Prince of the Holy Roman Empire (1772) and a favourite of Empress Catherine the Great. He was a leader of the 1762 coup which overthrew Catherine's husband Peter III and installed Catherine as reigning empress. For some years he was virtually co-ruler with her, but his repeated infidelities and the enmity of Catherine's other advisers led to his fall from power.

He patronised M. V. Lomonosov, D. I. Fonvisin, V. I. Bazhenov and gave them financial support. Honorary member of the Imperial Academy of Arts (since 1765). He collected paintings (including Rembrandt, P. P. Rubens, Titian), sculpture, Chinese, Japanese and Russian porcelain, hunting weapons, etc. (Orlov's collection has been preserved almost completely; it is now in the State Museum-Reserve "Gatchina" of the eponymous city). A large landowner, Orlov commissioned the construction of the Great Gatchina Palace.

== Overthrow of Peter ==
Orlov was the son of Gregory Orlov, governor of Great Novgorod. He had a younger brother Alexei Grigoryevich Orlov who would equally gain military and political prominence in Russia. Grigory Orlov was educated in the corps of cadets at Saint Petersburg, began his military career in the Seven Years' War, and was wounded at Zorndorf. In the late 1750s, according to Andrey Bolotov, he was initiated into the Freemasons. While serving in the capital as an artillery officer in the summer of 1761, he caught the fancy of the then Grand Duchess Catherine Alekseyevna, became her favourite (until 1772), and was the leader of the conspiracy which resulted in the dethronement and death of her husband, Emperor Peter III (1762). He drew and involved Izmailovsky, Preobrazhensky, and Semyonovsky regimental officers into this conspiracy.

After the event, Empress Catherine raised him to the rank of count and made him adjutant-general, director-general of engineers, and general-in-chief. They had an illegitimate son, Aleksey who was named after the village of Bobriki, and from whom descends the line of the Count Bobrinsky. Orlov's influence became paramount after the discovery of the Khitrovo plot (led by Fyodor Alekseevich Khitrovo) to murder the whole Orlov family. At one time, the Empress thought of marrying her favorite, but the plan was frustrated by her influential advisor Nikita Panin.

== Years of power ==
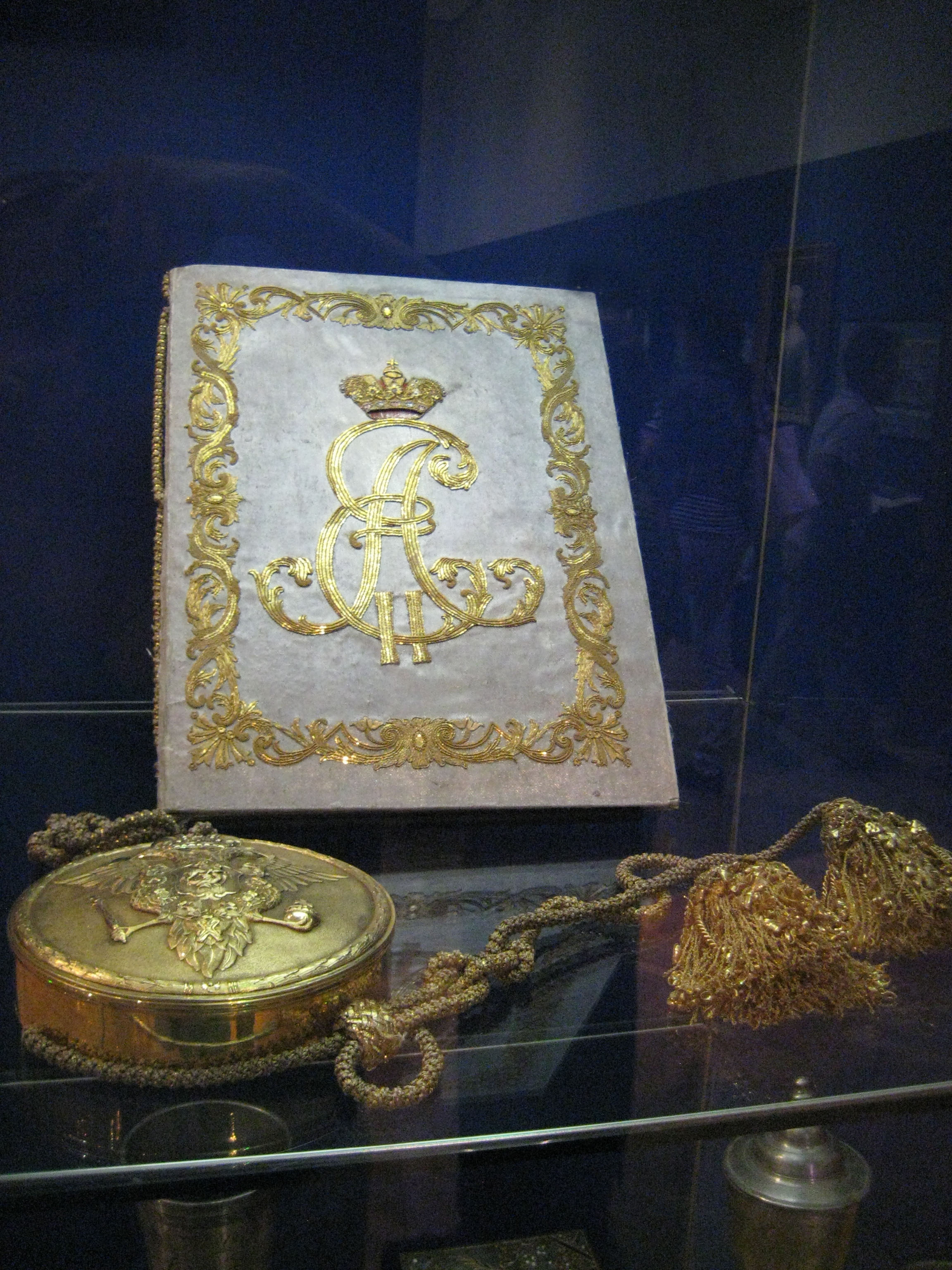
Orlov's charter granting him the status of Count

Orlov had a quick wit, a fairly accurate appreciation of current events, and was a useful and sympathetic counselor during the earlier portion of Catherine's reign. He entered with enthusiasm, from both patriotic and economic motives, into the question of the improvement of the condition of the serfs and their partial emancipation. He also led the investigation of Lieutenant Vasily Mirovich, who tried to free the former Russian Emperor Ivan VI Antonovich from the Shlisselburg Fortress (1764). Commander with the rank of Lieutenant Colonel of the Life Guard Horse Regiment (1764–83), chief of the Chevalier Guard Regiment – the Empress's personal guard (1765–83). As the president of the Free Economic Society, he was also their most prominent advocate in the great commission of 1767, though he aimed primarily at pleasing the empress, who affected great liberality in her earlier years. He promoted smallpox inoculation and was one of the first in Russia to inoculate against smallpox together with Empress Catherine II in 1768.

He was one of the earliest propagandists of the Slavophile idea of the emancipation of the Christians from Ottoman rule. During the Russo-Turkish War of 1768–74, he convinced Catherine to send the Navy at the Mediterranean, and was involved in the formation and dispatch of artillery teams to the front. In 1771, he was sent as first Russian plenipotentiary to the peace congress of Focşani, but he failed in his mission, owing partly to the obstinacy of the Ottomans, and partly (according to Panin) to his own outrageous insolence. In 1771 in Moscow he stopped the spread of the plague epidemic, which caused a "Plague Riot" in the city, stopped looting, opened hospitals and orphanages.

== Fall ==
Meanwhile, Orlov's enemies, led by Panin, were attempting to break up the relationship between Orlov and Catherine. They informed the empress that Orlov had seduced his 13-year-old relative. A handsome young officer, Alexander Vasilchikov, was installed as her new lover.

To rekindle Catherine's affection, Grigory presented to her one of the greatest diamonds of the world, known ever since as the Orlov Diamond. By the time he returned — without permission — to his Marble Palace at Saint Petersburg, Orlov found himself superseded in the empress's favor by the younger Grigory Potemkin. When Potemkin, in 1774, superseded Vasilchikov as the empress's lover, Orlov became of no account at court and went abroad for some years. He returned to Russia a few months prior to his death in Moscow in 1783.

== Later years and death ==
In 1777, at the age of 43, he married his 18-year-old relative, Catherine Zinovyeva, variously described by sources as either a niece or a cousin, but left no children by that marriage. Catherine died of tuberculosis in 1781, at the age of 22, in Lausanne, Switzerland. Her tomb, from which her body was removed in 1910, still remains in Cathedrale Notre-Dame in Lausanne.

For some time before his death, he had a serious mental illness, probably a form of dementia, which progressed towards complete mental collapse. After his death, the Empress Catherine wrote, "Although I have long been prepared for this sad event, it has nevertheless shaken me to the depths of my being. People may console me, I may even repeat to myself all those things which it is customary to say on such occasions—my only answer is strangled tears. I suffer intolerably."

== In popular culture ==
From 2020 to 2023, Gwilym Lee and Sacha Dhawan starred as two separate fictionalised versions of Grigory Orlov in the alternate historical and satirical comedy-drama Hulu/Disney+ television series The Great: An Occasionally True Story/An Almost Entirely Untrue Story, with Lee portraying Grigory "Grigor" Dymov (a composite character with Grigory Potemkin), the childhood best friend of Peter who grows close with his widow Catherine after both witness him accidentally drown in the third season, growing estranged from his wife Georgina and lover Marial in favor of caring for Catherine and her and Peter's son Paul, and Dhawan portraying Count Orlo, an advisor of Catherine's with whom she initially plans a coup against Peter in the first two seasons, before Catherine and Peter reconcile and Catherine unknowingly kills Orlo in the third-season premiere, shooting him while hunting in the forest with Peter.
