= Tryphon Turkestanov =

Revered hierarch of the Russian Orthodox Church

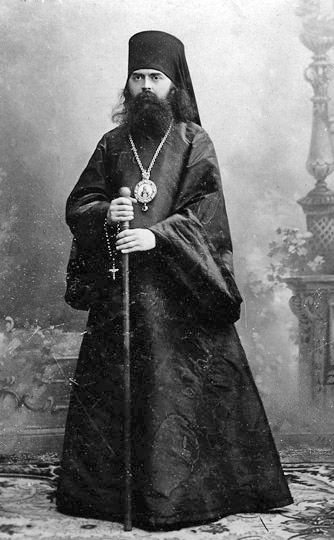
Tryphon Turkestanov

Metropolitan Tryphon (Russian: Митрополит Трифон; born Prince Boris Petrovich Turkestanov (Борис Петрович Туркестанов) November 29, 1861, Moscow — June 14, 1934) is a revered hierarch of the Russian Orthodox Church. In 1901 he became the Bishop of Dmitrov and a vicar of the Moscow Eparchy. On February 26, 1915, Trifon was awarded the Panagia on the Ribbon of Saint George and the Order of St. Alexander Nevsky for the divine service on the fronts of World War I. After Metropolitan Sergius proclaimed the declaration of loyalty of the Church to the Soviet state on August 19, 1927, Trifon accepted the praying "to authorities", which has been added to the great ektenia.

Turkestanov was a scion of the Georgian noble family Turkestanishvili. He first attended the Polivanov Classical Gymnasium, then entered the Moscow University. In 1887, Turkestanov became a lay brother in the Optina Monastery. In 1889 he became a monk and acquired the name Trifon, after the saint martyr. Two years later Trifon entered the Moscow Theological Seminary. In June 1916 he became the superior of the New Jerusalem Monastery. In 1923 Trifon was elevated to archbishop. Shortly before his death Trifon became blind. He was buried in the Vvedenskoye Cemetery in Moscow.
