= Saint Tryphon =

Saint Tryphon, Triphon or Trifon may refer to:

== Saints ==
- Tryphon of Campsada, 3rd-century saint
- Tryphon of Constantinople, Patriarch of Constantinople (928–931)
- Tryphon of Pechenga, 16th-century saint
- Tryphon of Vyatka, 16th-century Russian saint

== Places ==
- Saint-Triphon, Switzerland
- Kotor Cathedral, a.k.a. Saint Tryphon’s Cathedral, Montenegro
- San Trifone in Posterula, a now-demolished church in Rome dedicated to Saint Tryphon
