= Peter the Great =

Tsar of Russia from 1682 to 1725

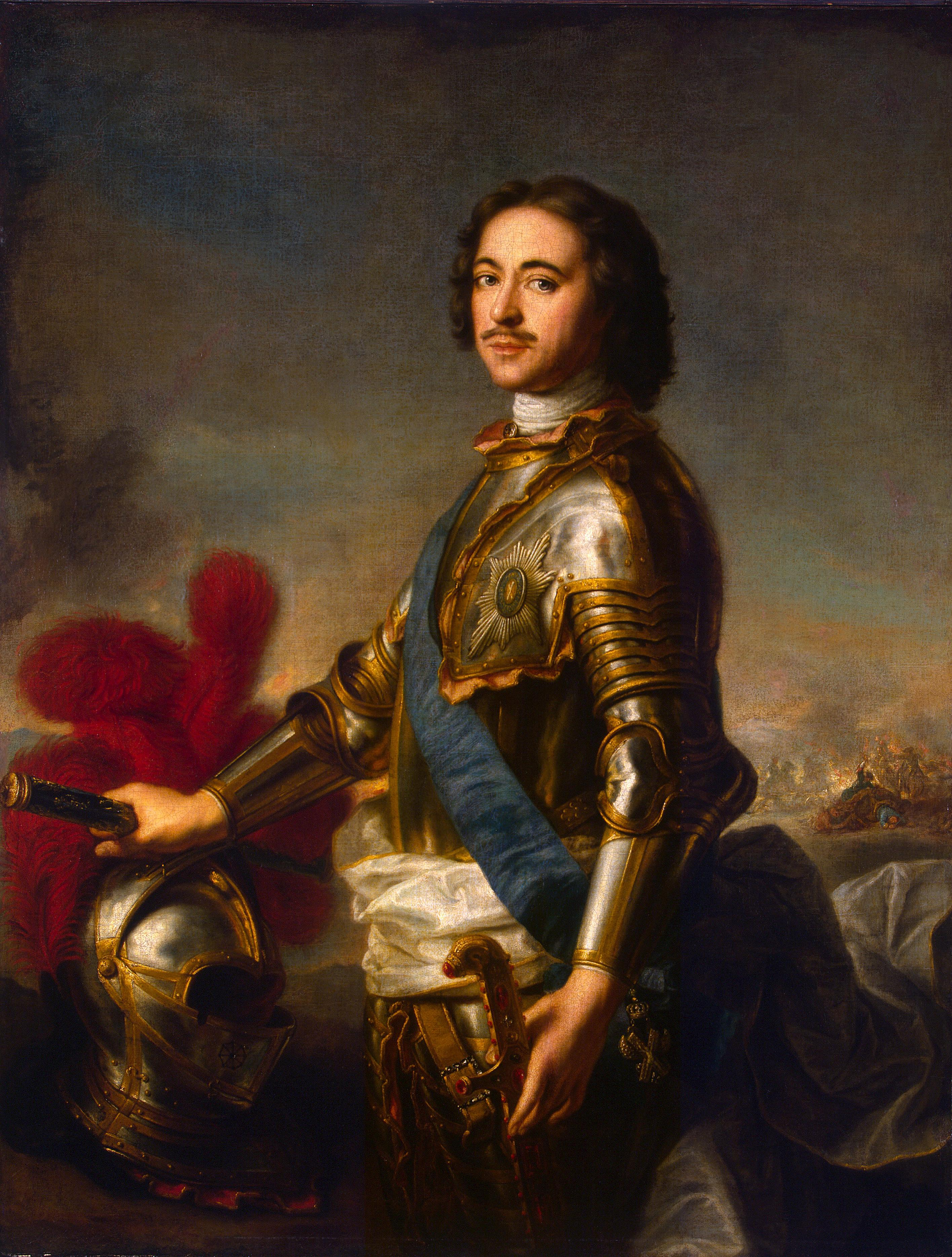
- Portrait by Jean-Marc Nattier, 1717

Emperor of Russia
- Reign: 2 November 1721 – 8 February 1725
- Predecessor: Himself as Tsar
- Successor: Catherine I

Tsar of all Russia
- Reign: 7 May 1682 – 2 November 1721
- Coronation: 25 June 1682
- Predecessor: Feodor III
- Successor: Himself as Emperor
- Co-monarch: Ivan V (1682–1696)
- Regent: Sophia Alekseyevna (1682–1689)
- Born: 9 June 1672; Moscow, Tsardom of Russia
- Died: 8 February 1725 (aged 52); Saint Petersburg, Russian Empire
- Burial: Peter and Paul Cathedral
- Spouses: Eudoxia Lopukhina (m. 1689; ann. 1698) Catherine Alekseyevna (m. 1707)
- Issue Detail: Alexei Petrovich, Tsarevich of Russia; Anna, Duchess of Holstein-Gottorp; Elizabeth, Empress of Russia; Peter Petrovich, Tsarevich of Russia; Grand Duchess Natalia Petrovna
Names
- Peter Alekseyevich Romanov
- House: Romanov
- Father: Alexis of Russia
- Mother: Natalya Naryshkina
- Military career
- Style: text-align:center;
- Allegiance: Tsardom of Russia; Russian Empire
- Branch: Army of Peter the Great; Imperial Russian Army
- Conflicts: Conflicts: Great Turkish War; Russo-Turkish War; Azov campaigns; Great Northern War; Ingrian campaign; Siege of Nöteborg; Siege of Nyenschantz; Siege of Dorpat; Siege of Narva; Siege of Mitau; Siege of Viborg (1706); Battle of Grodno; Battle of Malatitze; Battle of Lesnaya; Battle of Poltava; Siege of Viborg (1710); Capitulation of Estonia and Livonia; Pruth River Campaign; Battle of Helsinki; Battle of Gangut; Persian Campaign of Peter the Great; Battle of the Inchkhe River; Battle of Derbent; Capture of Rasht; Siege of Baku

Peter I (Note: Russian: Пётр І, romanized: Pyotr I) (9 June 1672 – 8 February 1725), known by the epithet the Great, (Note: Russian: Пётр Великий, romanized: Pyotr Velikiy) was the tsar of all Russia from 1682 to 1721, and the first emperor of Russia from 1721 until his death in 1725. He reigned jointly with his brother, Ivan V, from 1682 until Ivan's death in 1696.

Much of Peter's reign was consumed by lengthy wars against the Ottoman and Swedish empires. His Azov campaigns were followed by the foundation of the Russian Navy; after his victory in the Great Northern War, Russia annexed a significant portion of the eastern Baltic coastline and was officially raised from a tsardom to an empire. Peter led a cultural revolution that replaced some of the traditionalist and medieval social and political systems with ones that were modern, scientific, Westernized, and based on the radical Enlightenment.

In December 1699, he introduced the Julian calendar, and in 1703, he introduced the first Russian newspaper, Sankt-Peterburgskie Vedomosti, and ordered the civil script, a reform of Russian orthography largely designed by himself. On the shores of the Neva River, he founded Saint Petersburg, a city famously dubbed by Francesco Algarotti as the "window to the West". In 1712, Peter relocated the capital from Moscow to St. Petersburg, a status it retained until 1918. Peter had a great interest in plants, animals and minerals, in malformed creatures or exceptions to the law of nature for his cabinet of curiosities. He encouraged research of deformities, all along trying to debunk the superstitious fear of monsters. He promoted industrialization in the Russian Empire and higher education. The Russian Academy of Sciences and Saint Petersburg State University were founded in 1724, and invited Christian Wolff and Willem 's Gravesande.

Peter is primarily credited with the modernization of the country, quickly transforming it into a major European power. His administrative reforms, creating a Governing Senate in 1711, the Collegium in 1717 and the Table of Ranks in 1722, had a lasting impact on Russia, and many institutions of the Russian government trace their origins to his reign.

== Early life ==
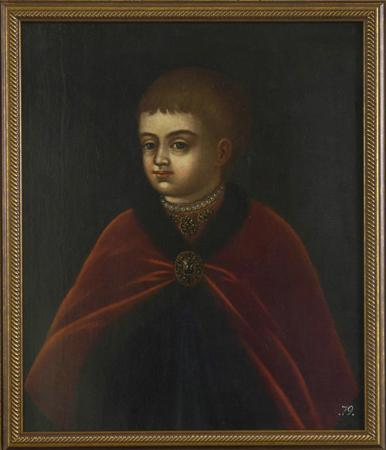
Peter as a child

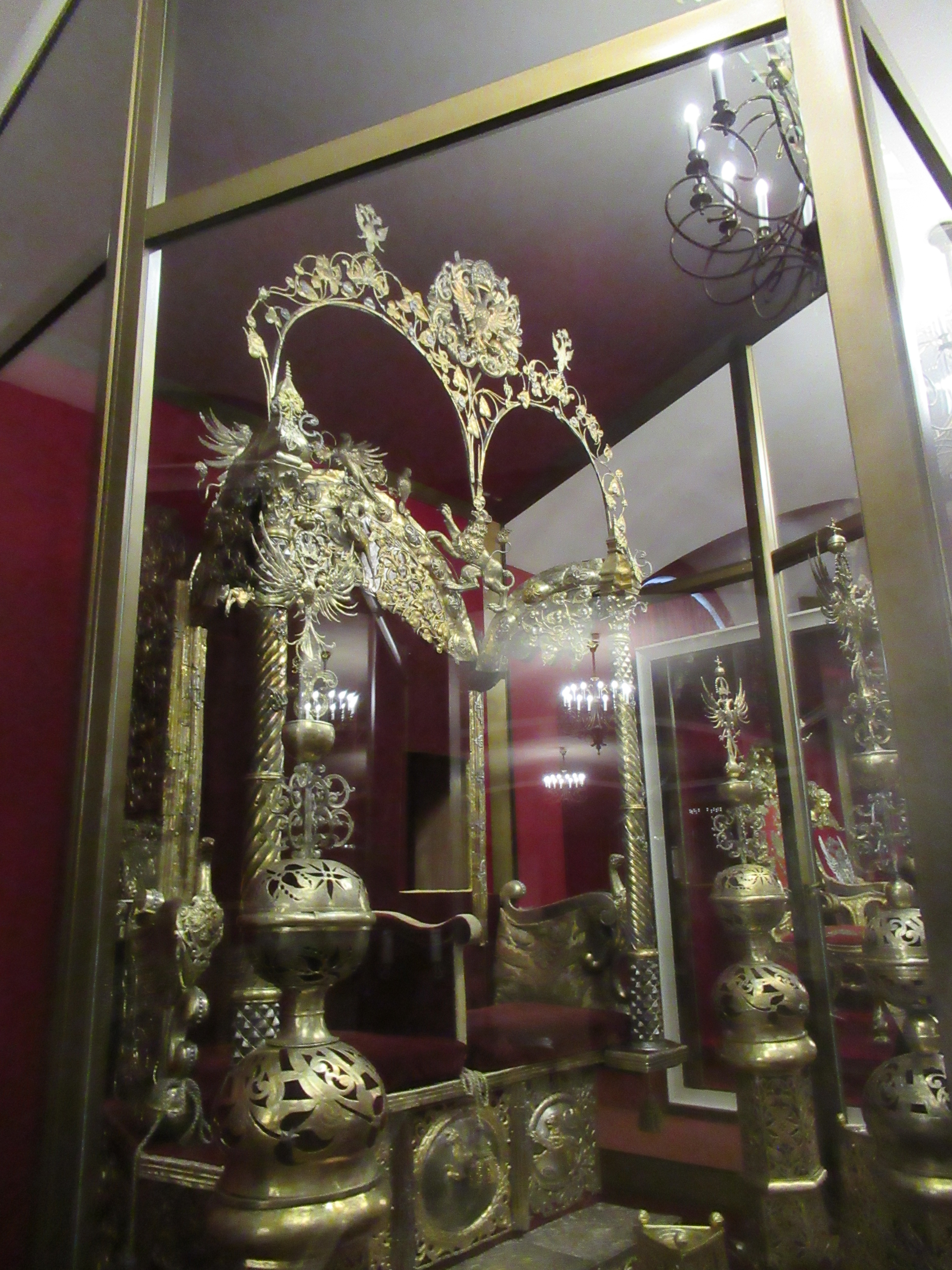
Double throne in Kremlin Armoury. A large hole was cut in the back of the dual-seated throne used by Ivan and Peter. Sophia would sit behind the throne and listen as Peter conversed with nobles, while feeding him information and giving him responses to questions and problems.

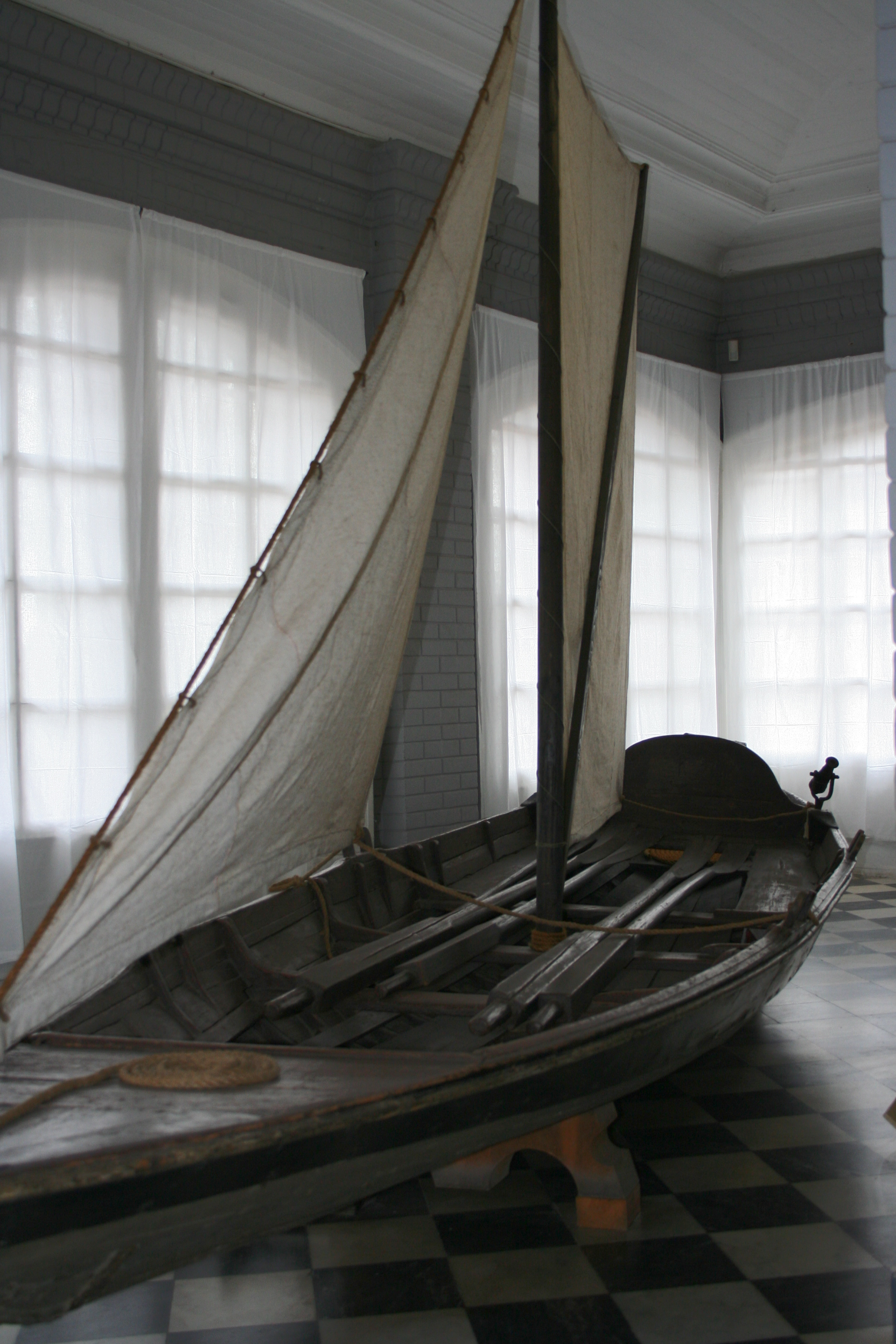
Peter's ship, rigged with a sail and a mast with the help of Dutch carpenters

Peter grew up at Izmaylovo Estate and was educated at the Amusement Palace from an early age by several tutors commissioned by his father Tsar Alexei Mikailovich, most notably Nikita Zotov, Patrick Gordon, and Paul Menesius. When his father died in 1676, he left the sovereignty to Peter's elder half-brother, the crippled Feodor III. Throughout this period, the government was largely run by Artamon Matveyev, an enlightened friend of Alexis, who was the political head of the Naryshkin family of Peter's mother Natalya Naryshkina and one of Peter's greatest childhood benefactors.

This position changed when Feodor died in 1682. As Feodor did not leave any children, a dispute arose between the Miloslavsky family (Maria Miloslavskaya was the first wife of Alexis I) and Naryshkin family (Natalya Naryshkina was his second wife) over who should inherit the throne. He jointly ruled with his elder half-brother, Ivan V, until 1696. Ivan was next in line but was weakminded and blind. Consequently, the Boyar Duma (a council of Russian nobles) chose the 10-year-old Peter to become tsar, with his mother as regent. A hole was cut in the back of the throne, so that she, literally behind the scenes, could whisper to the two boys.

The "Moscow Grand Discharge" started in 1677 and was completed in 1688; it affected noble families with high ranks in the administration; the ministries were also reduced in number. This provoked fierce reactions. Sophia, one of Alexis' daughters from his first marriage, led a rebellion of the streltsy (Russia's elite military corps) in April–May 1682. In the subsequent conflict, some of Peter's relatives and friends were murdered, including Artamon Matveyev, and Peter witnessed some of these acts of political violence.

The streltsy made it possible for Sophia, the Miloslavskys (the clan of Ivan), and their allies to insist that Peter and Ivan be proclaimed joint tsars, with Ivan being acclaimed as the senior. Sophia then acted as regent during the minority of the sovereigns and exercised all power. For seven years, she ruled as an autocrat.

From 1682 to 1689, Peter and his mother were banished to Preobrazhenskoye. At the age of 16, he discovered an English boat on the estate, had it restored and learned to sail. He received a sextant, but did not know how to use it. Peter was fascinated by sundials. Therefore, he began a search for a foreign expert in the German Quarter. Peter befriended Andrew Vinius, a bibliophile, who taught him Dutch and two Dutch carpenters, Frans Timmerman and Karsten Brandt. Peter studied arithmetic, geometry, and military sciences (fortification). He was not interested in a musical education but liked fireworks and drumming.

Peter was not particularly concerned that others ruled in his name; Boris Golitsyn and Fyodor Apraksin played an important role. He engaged in such pastimes as shipbuilding in Pereslavl-Zalessky and sailing at Lake Pleshcheyevo, as well as mock battles with his toy army. Peter's mother sought to force him to adopt a more conventional approach and arranged his marriage to Eudoxia Lopukhina in 1689. The marriage was a failure, and 10 years later, Peter forced his wife to become a nun and thus freed himself from the union.

By the summer of 1689, Peter, planned to take power from his half-sister Sophia, whose position had been weakened by two unsuccessful Crimean campaigns against the Crimean Khanate in an attempt to stop devastating Crimean Tatar raids into Russia's southern lands. When she learned of his designs, Sophia conspired with some leaders of the Streltsy, who continually aroused disorder and dissent. Peter, warned by others from the Streltsy, escaped in the middle of the night to the impenetrable monastery of Troitse-Sergiyeva Lavra; there he slowly gathered adherents who perceived he would win the power struggle. Sophia was eventually overthrown, with Peter I and Ivan V continuing to act as co-tsars. Peter forced Sophia to enter a convent, where she gave up her name and her position as a member of the royal family.

Meanwhile, he was a frequent guest in the German quarter, where he met Anna and Willem Mons. In 1692 he sent Eberhard Isbrand Ides as envoy to the Kangxi Emperor of China. In 1693 he sailed to Solovetsky Monastery and accepted divine providence after surviving a storm. Still, Peter could not acquire actual control over Russian affairs. Power was instead exercised by his mother. It was only when Natalya died in 1694 that Peter, then aged 22, became an independent sovereign. Formally, Ivan V was a co-ruler with Peter, though being ineffective. Peter became the sole ruler when Ivan died in 1696 without male offspring.

Peter grew to be extremely tall, especially for the time period, reportedly standing 6 ft 8 in (2.03 m). He was seen as a "second Goliath" or Samson. Saint-Simon described him in 1717 as "tall, well-formed and slim... with a look both bewildered and fierce". Peter had noticeable facial tics, and he may have suffered from neck spasm.

== Ideology of Peter's reign ==
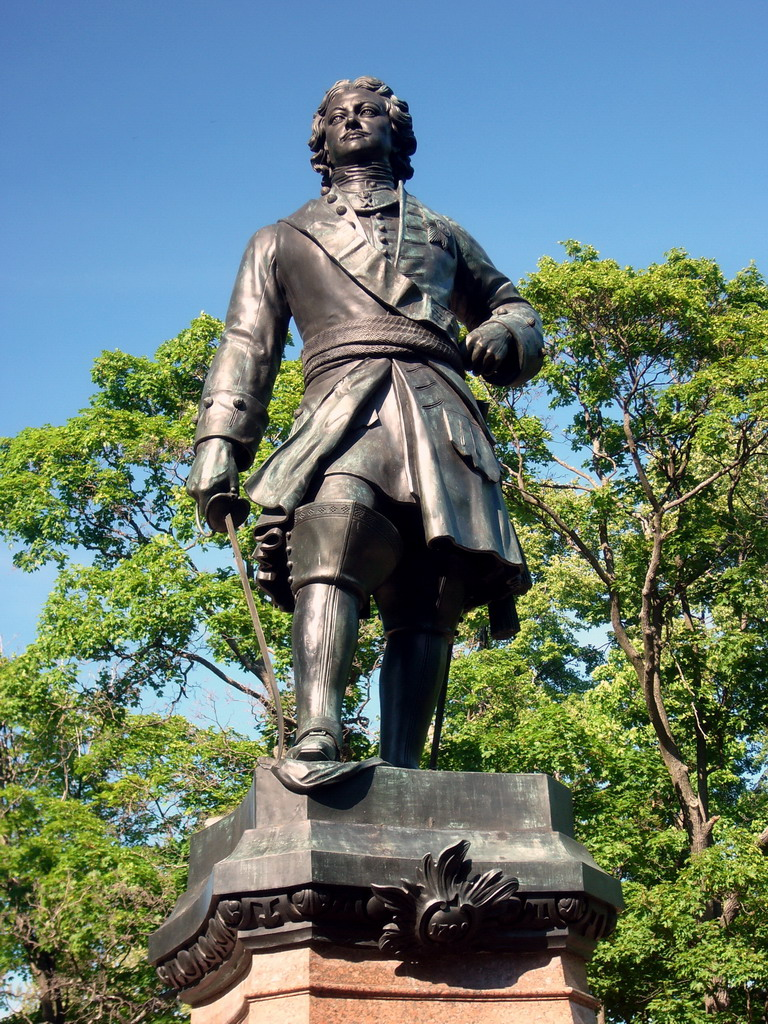
Monument to Peter the Great in Kronstadt

As a young man, Peter I adopted the Protestant model of existence in a pragmatic world of competition and personal success, which largely shaped the philosophy of his reformism. He perceived the Russian people as rude, unintelligent, stubborn in their sluggishness, a child, a lazy student. He highly appreciated the state's role in the life of society, saw it as an ideal instrument for achieving high goals, saw it as a universal institution for transforming people, with the help of violence and fear, into educated, conscious, law-abiding and useful to the whole society subjects. Peter had a keen interest in The Education of a Christian Prince which offers advice to rulers on how to govern justly and wisely.

He introduced into the concept of the autocrat's power the notion of the monarch's duties. He considered it necessary to take care of his subjects, to protect them from enemies, to work for their benefit. Above all, he put the interests of Russia. He saw his mission in turning it into a power similar to Western countries, and subordinated his own life and the lives of his subjects to the realization of this idea. Gradually, Peter penetrated the idea that the task should be solved with the help of reforms, which will be carried out at the autocrat's will, who creates good and punishes evil. He considered the morality of a statesman separately from the morality of a private person and believed that the sovereign in the name of state interests can go to murder, violence, forgery and deceit.

He went through the naval service, starting from the lowest ranks: bombardier (1695), captain (1696), colonel (1706), schout-bij-nacht (1709), vice-admiral (1714), admiral (1721). By hard daily work (according to the figurative expression of Peter the Great himself, he was simultaneously "forced to hold a sword and a quill in one right hand") and courageous behavior he demonstrated to his subjects his personal positive example, showed how to act, fully devoting himself to the fulfillment of duty and service to the fatherland.

== Reign ==
Europe in 1721 (in German)

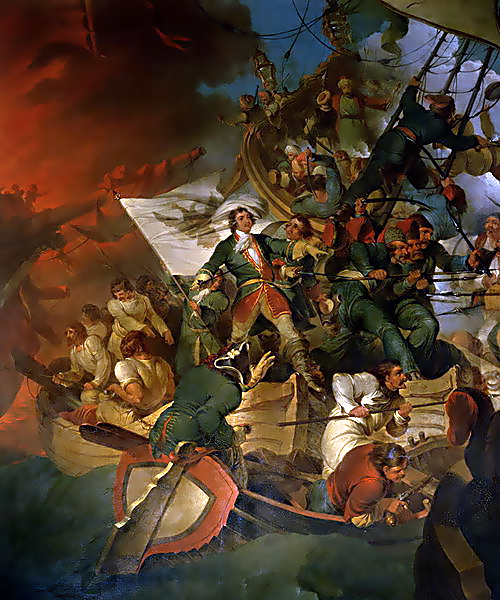
Capture of Azov, 1696, by Robert Ker Porter

Peter reigned for around 43 years. He implemented sweeping reforms aimed at modernizing Russia. Heavily influenced by his advisors, like Jacob Bruce, Peter reorganized the Russian army along modern lines and dreamed of making Russia a maritime power. He faced much opposition to these policies at home but brutally suppressed rebellions against his authority, including by the Streltsy, Bashkirs, Astrakhan, and the greatest civil uprising of his reign, the Bulavin Rebellion.

In his process to westernize Russia, he wanted members of his family to marry other European royalty. In the past, his ancestors had been snubbed at the idea; however, it was proving fruitful. He negotiated with Frederick William, Duke of Courland to marry his niece, Anna Ivanovna. He used the wedding in order to launch his new capital, St Petersburg, where he had already ordered building projects of westernized palaces and buildings. Peter hired Italian and German architects to design it. He attracted Domenico Trezzini, Carlo Bartolomeo Rastrelli, Jean-Baptiste Alexandre Le Blond and Andreas Schlüter.

To improve his nation's position on the seas, Peter sought more maritime outlets. His only outlet at the time was the White Sea at Arkhangelsk. The Baltic Sea was at the time controlled by Sweden in the north, while the Black Sea and the Caspian Sea were controlled by the Ottoman Empire and Safavid Empire respectively in the south. The country's need for metal was exacerbated by the outbreak of wars for access to the Black and Baltic Seas.

Peter attempted to acquire control of the Black Sea, which would require expelling the Tatars from the surrounding areas. As part of an agreement with Poland that ceded Kiev to Russia, Peter was forced to wage war against the Crimean Khan and against the Khan's overlord, the Ottoman Sultan. Peter's primary objective became the capture of the Ottoman fortress of Azov, near the Don River. In the summer of 1695 Peter organized the Azov campaigns to take the fortress, but his attempts ended in failure.

Peter returned to Moscow in November 1695 and began building a large navy in Voronezh. He launched about thirty ships against the Ottomans in 1696, capturing Azov in July of that year. He appointed Alexander Gordon, who later would publish a biography on Peter. Peter used to hold all his important meetings and numerous celebrations in Le Fort's palace.

=== Grand Embassy ===
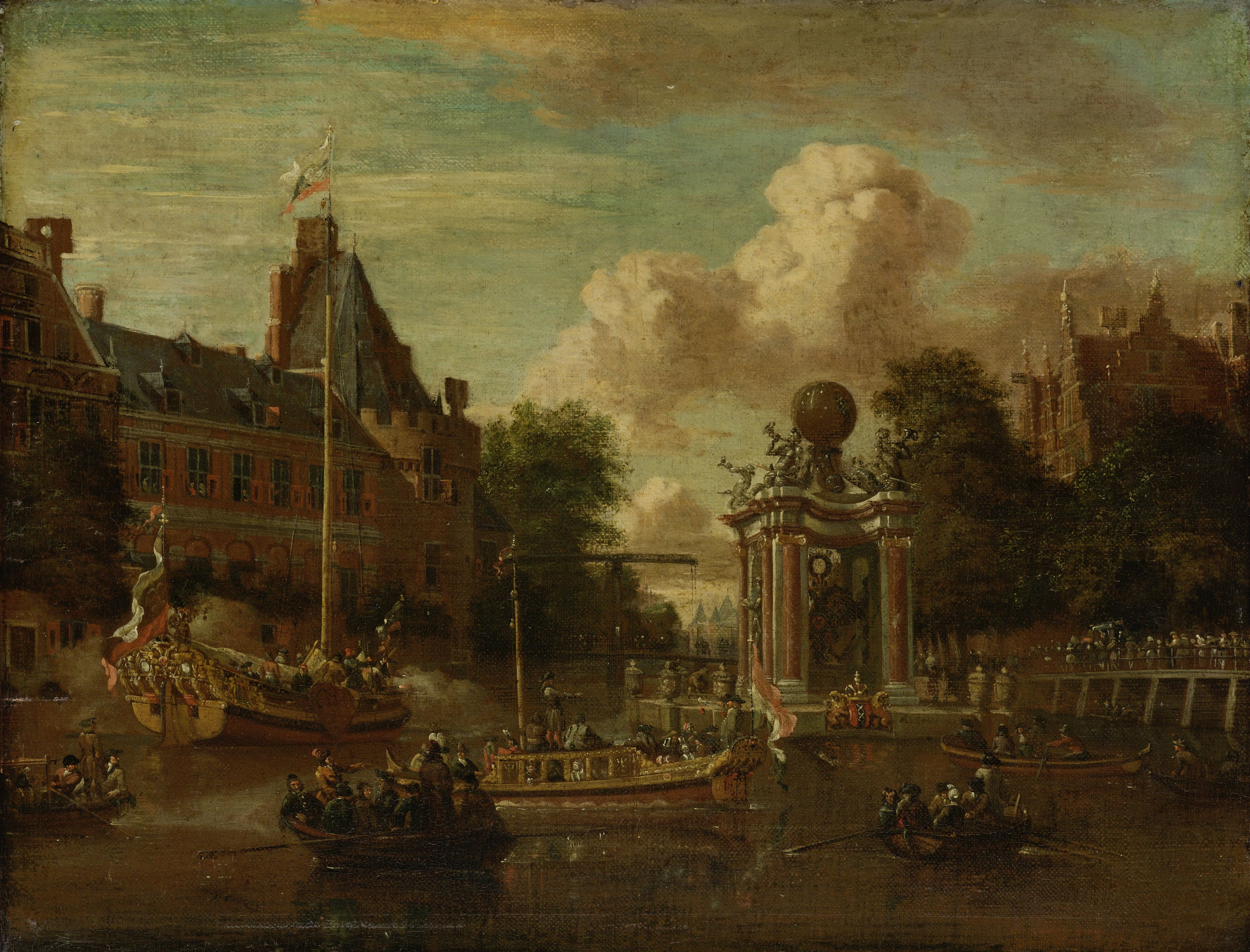
Abraham Storck: Spectacle on the Amstel river, August 1697

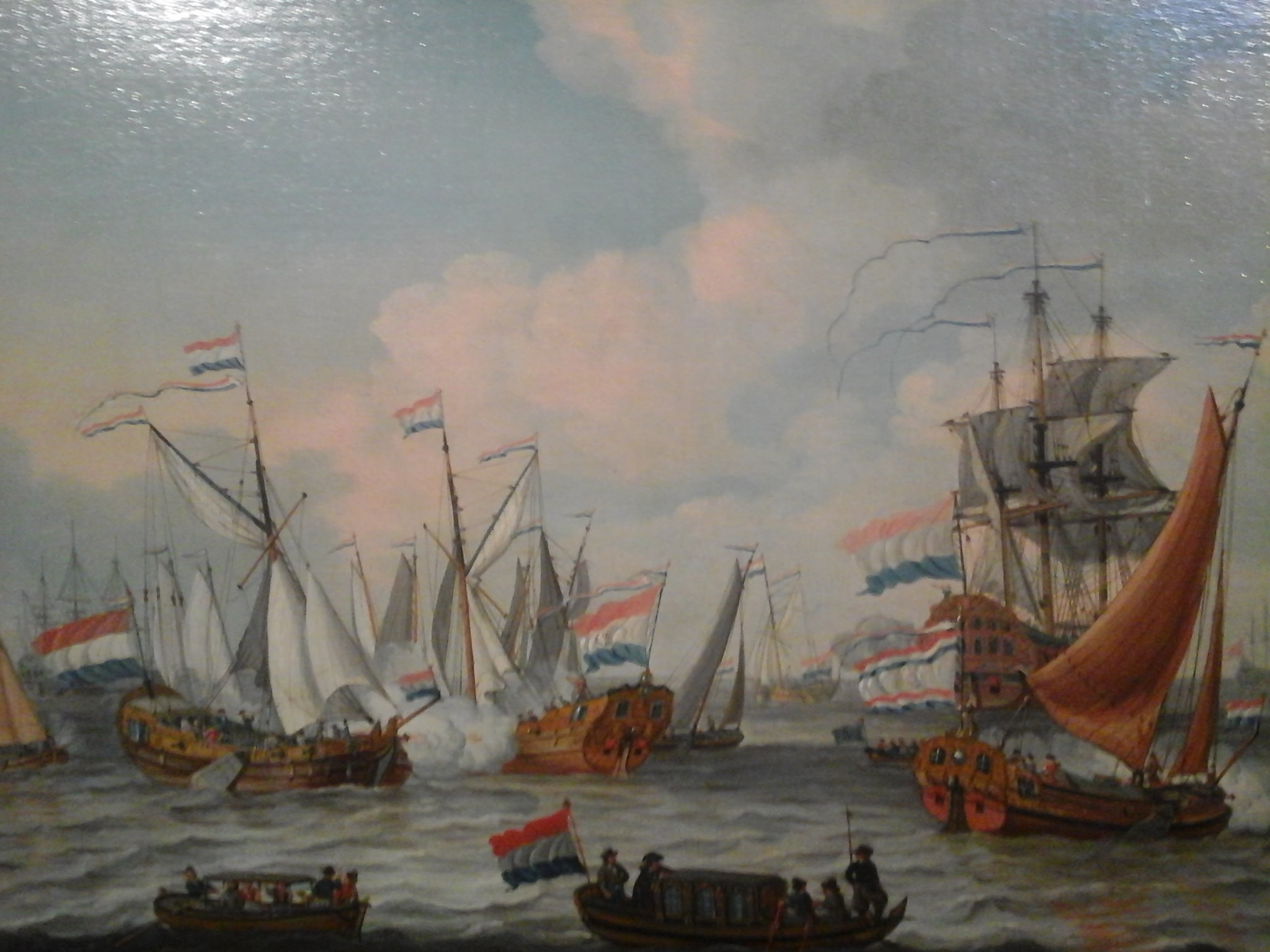
Fleet Manoeuvres Performed on the IJ on 1 September 1697 during Peter's Visit to Amsterdam, painting by Adam Silo (Hermitage)

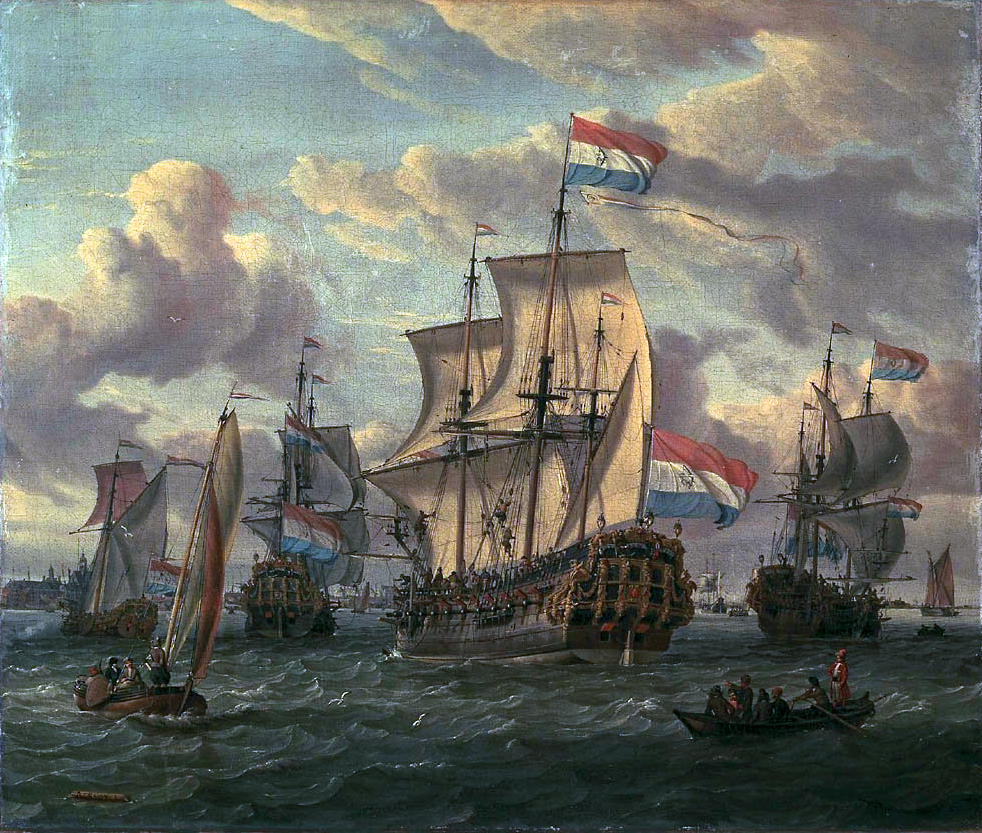
The frigate Pieter and Paul on the IJ while Peter stands on the small ship on the right. Painting by A. Storck. This ship sank on his second voyage.

Peter knew that Russia could not face the Ottoman Empire alone. In March 1697, he traveled "incognito" to Western Europe on an 18-month journey with a large Russian delegation—the so-called "Grand Embassy". Peter was the first tsar to leave Russia for more than 100 years. He used a fake name, allowing him to escape social and diplomatic events, but since he was far taller than most others, he could not fool anyone. One goal was to seek the aid of European monarchs, but Peter's hopes were dashed. France was a traditional ally of the Ottoman Sultan, and Austria was eager to maintain peace in the east while conducting its own wars in the west. Peter, furthermore, had chosen an inopportune moment: the Europeans at the time were more concerned about the War of the Spanish Succession over who would succeed the childless King Charles II of Spain than about fighting the Ottoman Sultan. Peter failed to expand the anti-Ottoman alliance.

In Riga, the local Swedish commander Erik Dahlbergh decided to pretend that he did not recognize Peter and did not allow him to inspect the fortifications. (Three years later, Peter would cite the inhospitable reception as one of the reasons for starting the Great Northern War). He met Frederick Casimir Kettler, the Duke of Courland. In Königsberg, the tsar was apprenticed for two months to an artillery engineer. (Decrees were issued on the construction of the first Ural blast furnace plants.) In July he met Sophia of Hanover at Coppenbrügge castle. She described him: "The tsar is a tall, handsome man, with an attractive face. He has a lively mind is very witty. Only, someone so well endowed by nature could be a little better mannered." Peter rented a ship in Emmerich am Rhein and sailed to Zaandam, where he arrived on 18 August 1697.

==== Amsterdam ====
Peter studied saw-mills, manufacturing and shipbuilding in Zaandam but left after a week. He sailed to Amsterdam after he was recognized and attacked. The log-cabin he rented became the Czar Peter House. He sailed to Texel to see a fleet. Through the mediation of Nicolaas Witsen, an expert on Russia, the tsar was given the opportunity to gain practical experience in shipyard, belonging to the Dutch East India Company, for a period of four months, under the supervision of Gerrit Claesz Pool. The diligent and capable tsar assisted in the construction of an East Indiaman Peter and Paul specially laid down for him. Peter felt that the ship's carpenters in Holland worked too much by eye and lacked accurate construction drawings. During his stay the tsar engaged many skilled workers such as builders of locks, fortresses, shipwrights, and seamen—including Cornelis Cruys, a vice-admiral who became, under Franz Lefort, the tsar's advisor in maritime affairs; engineer Menno van Coehoorn refused. Peter put his knowledge of shipbuilding to use in helping build Russia's navy.

Peter and Witsen visited Frederik Ruysch who had all the specimens exposed in five rooms. He taught Peter how to catch butterflies and how to preserve them. They also had a common interest in lizards. Together they went to see patients. He arrived in Utrecht on a barge and met stadtholder William III in a tavern. When he visited the States-General of the Netherlands he left the hall and the astonished attendees with his wig pulled over his head, according to Massie. He visited Jan van der Heyden, the inventor of a fire hose. He collected paintings by Adam Silo with ships and seascapes. In October 1697, the Tsar visited Delft and received an "eal viewer" from the microscopist Antoni van Leeuwenhoek. After the Peace of Ryswick he was invited by King of England to visit him. The Dutch regents considered the Tsar too inquisitive, and this affected their willingness to help the Russians.

==== Deptford ====
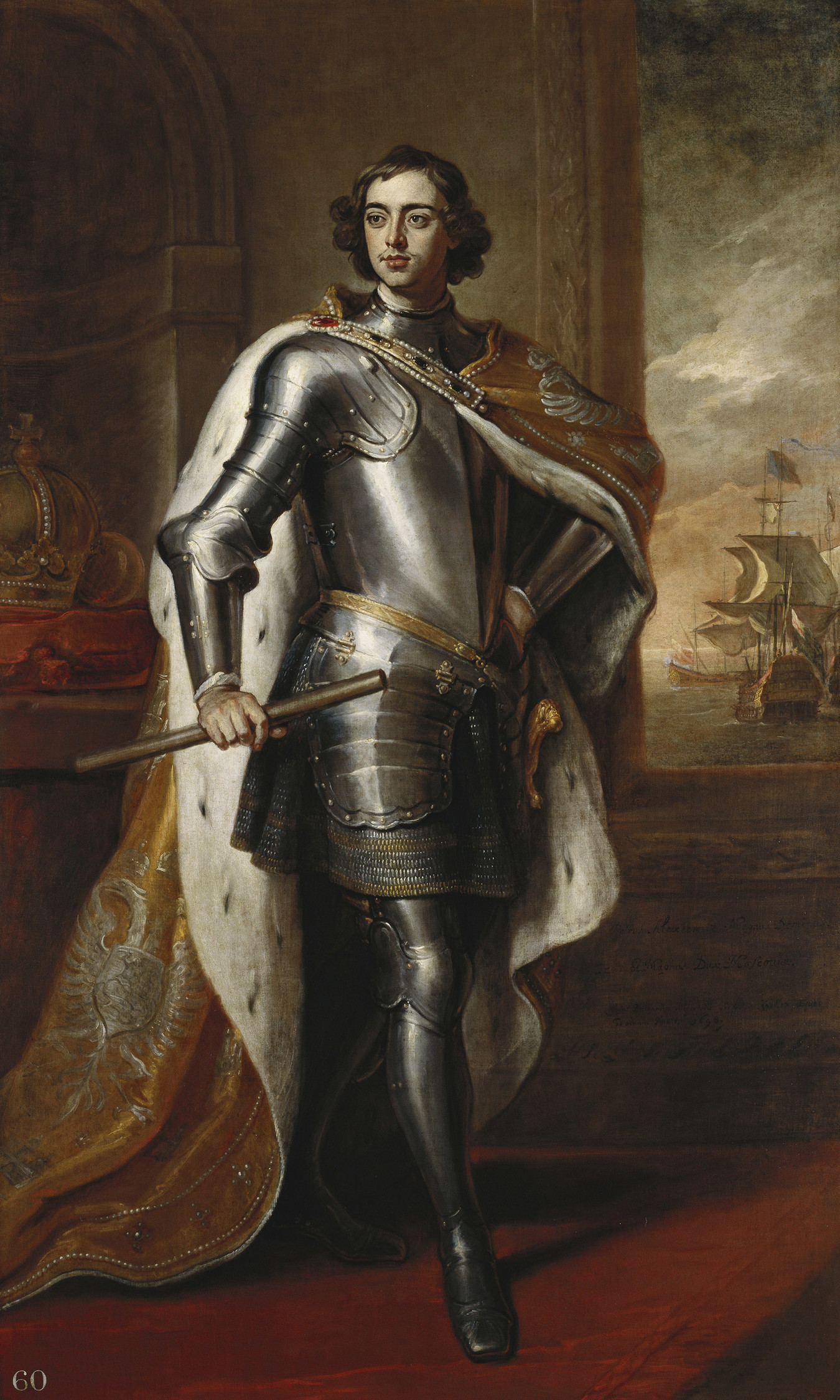
Portrait of Peter I by Godfrey Kneller, 1698. This portrait was Peter's gift to the King of England.

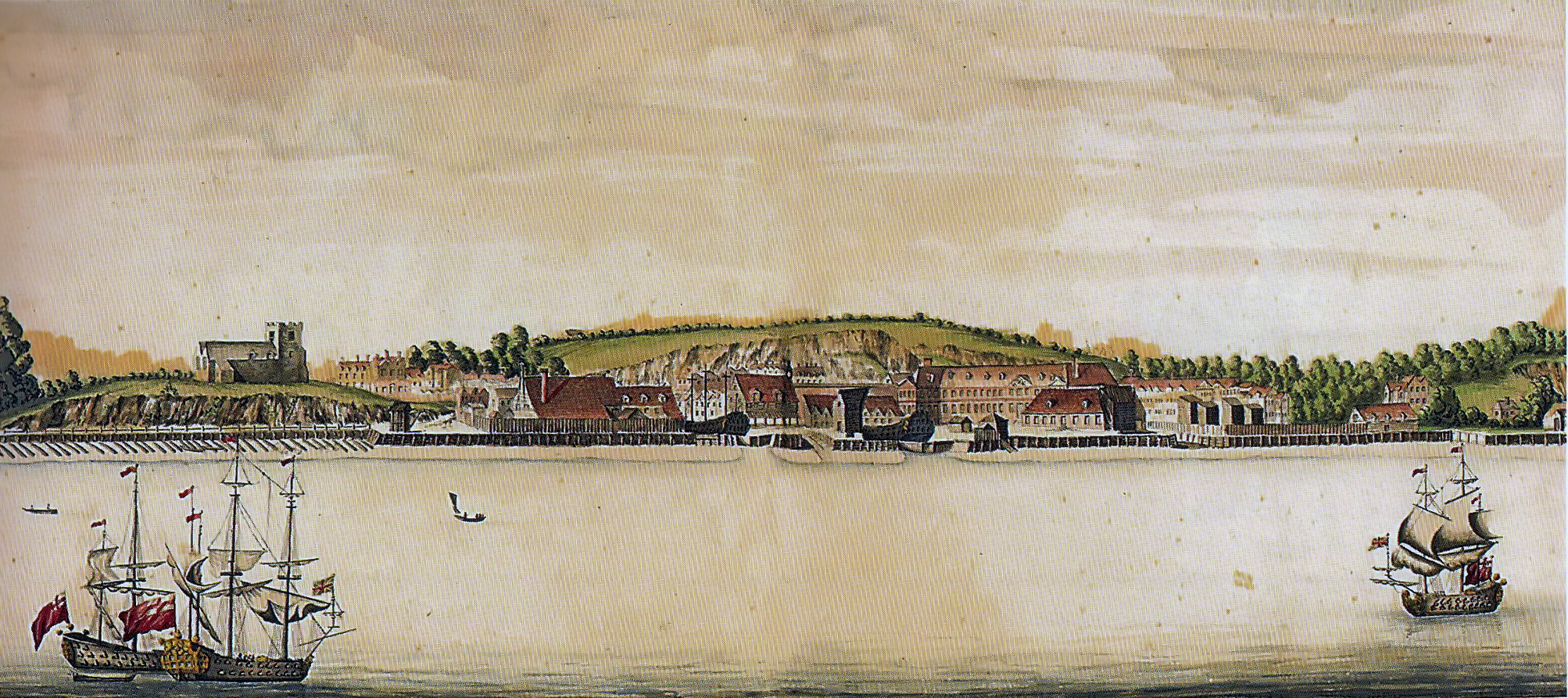
Woolwich Dockyard in 1698: the recently erected Great Storehouse (centre-right) dominates the built environment of the dockyard.

On 11 January 1698 (O.S.), Peter arrived at Victoria Embankment with four chamberlains, three interpreters (Peter Shafirov, LeFort), two clock makers, a cook, a priest, six trumpeters, 70 soldiers from the Preobrazhensky regiment, four dwarfs and a monkey which he purchased in Amsterdam; Jacob Bruce accompanied him. Peter stayed at 21 Norfolk Street, Strand, and met with Bishop of Salisbury Gilbert Burnet and Thomas Osborne and posed for Sir Godfrey Kneller. He watched the proceedings within the Parliament from a rooftop window. At some time, he had an affair with actress Letitia Cross. He visited the Royal Mint four times; it is not clear whether he ever met Isaac Newton, the mint's warden, who introduced milling on the coinage. Peter was impressed by the Great Recoinage of 1696, according to Massie.

At some time he visited Spithead, Plymouth, with captain John Perry to watch a mock battle. In February he attended a Fleet Review in Deptford, and inspected the Woolwich Dockyard and Royal Arsenal with Anthony Deane. For three months he stayed at Sayes Court as the guest of John Evelyn, a member of the Royal Society. He was trained on a telescope at the Greenwich Observatory by John Flamsteed. Peter communicated with Thomas Story and William Penn about their position that believers should not join the military. King William III presented a schooner with a whole crew to Peter I in exchange for the monopoly right of English merchants to trade tobacco in Russia (see Charles Whitworth). At the end of April 1698 he left after being shown how to make watches, and carpeting coffins. Back in Holland he visited Harderwijk and Cleves.

The Embassy next went to Leipzig, Dresden, where he met with Queen Christiane Eberhardine of Poland-Lithuania. Three times he visited the Kunstsammlung, then Königstein Fortress, Prague, and Vienna, where he paid a visit to Leopold I. At Rava-Ruska, he crossed the border and Peter spoke with Augustus II the Strong. Peter's visit was cut short, when he was informed of the second Streltsy uprising in June. The rebellion was easily crushed by General Gordon before Peter returned home early September. Peter nevertheless acted ruthlessly towards the mutineers; 4,600 rebels were sent to prison. Around 1,182 were tortured and executed, and Peter ordered that their bodies be publicly exhibited as a warning to future conspirators. The Streltsy were disbanded, and Peter's half-sister Sophia, who they sought to put on the throne, was kept in strictest seclusion at Novodevichy Convent.

Peter's visits to the West impressed upon him the notion that European customs were in several respects superior to Russian traditions. He commanded all of his courtiers and officials to wear European clothing (no caftans) and cut off their long beards, causing Boyars and Old Believers, who were very fond of their beards, great upset. Boyars who sought to retain their beards were required to pay an annual beard tax of one hundred rubles. In the same year, Peter also sought to end arranged marriages, which were the norm among the Russian nobility, because he thought such a practice was barbaric and led to domestic violence, since the partners usually resented each other.

=== Reforms ===
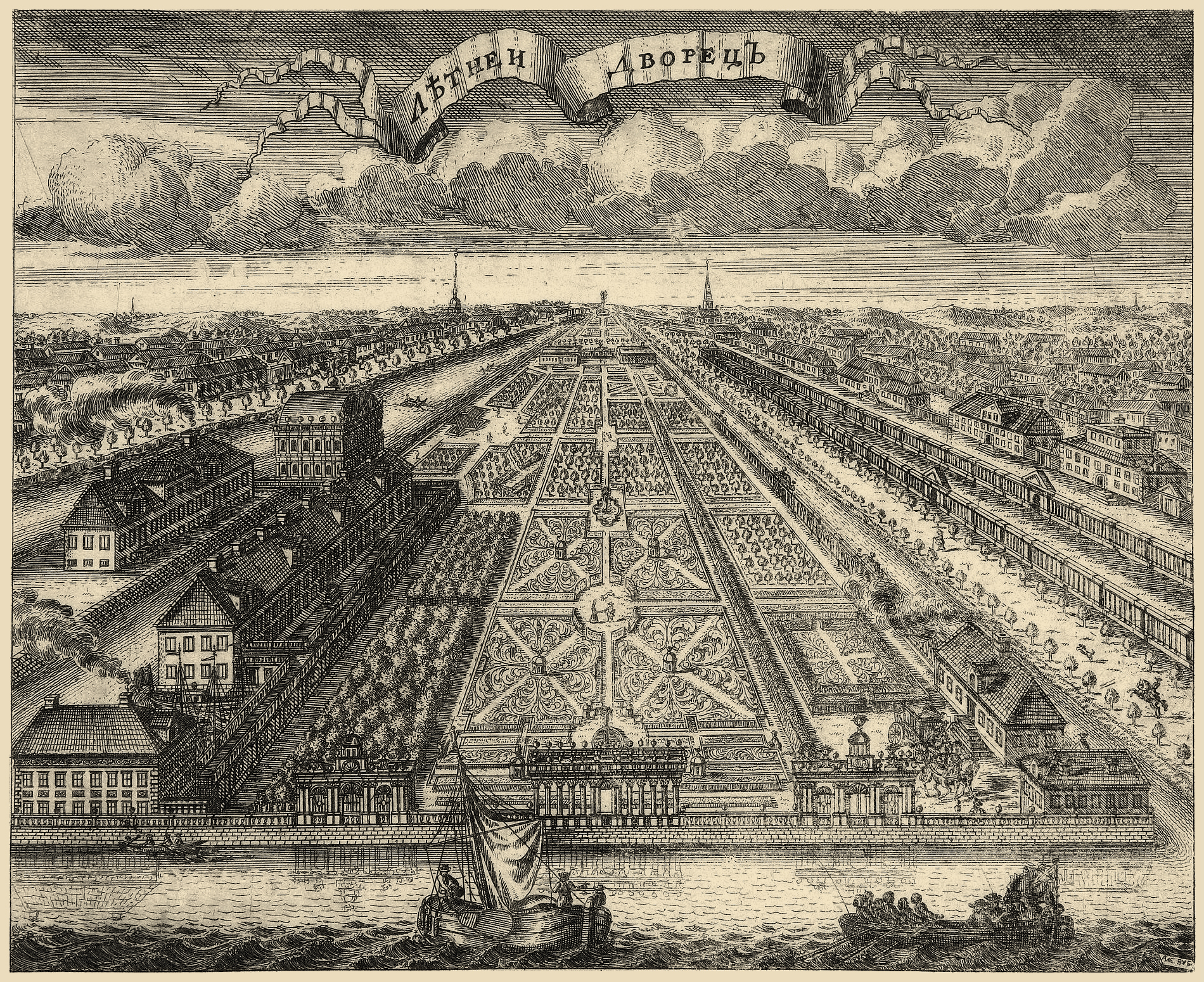
Vista through the Summer Garden towards the Summer Palace, 1716

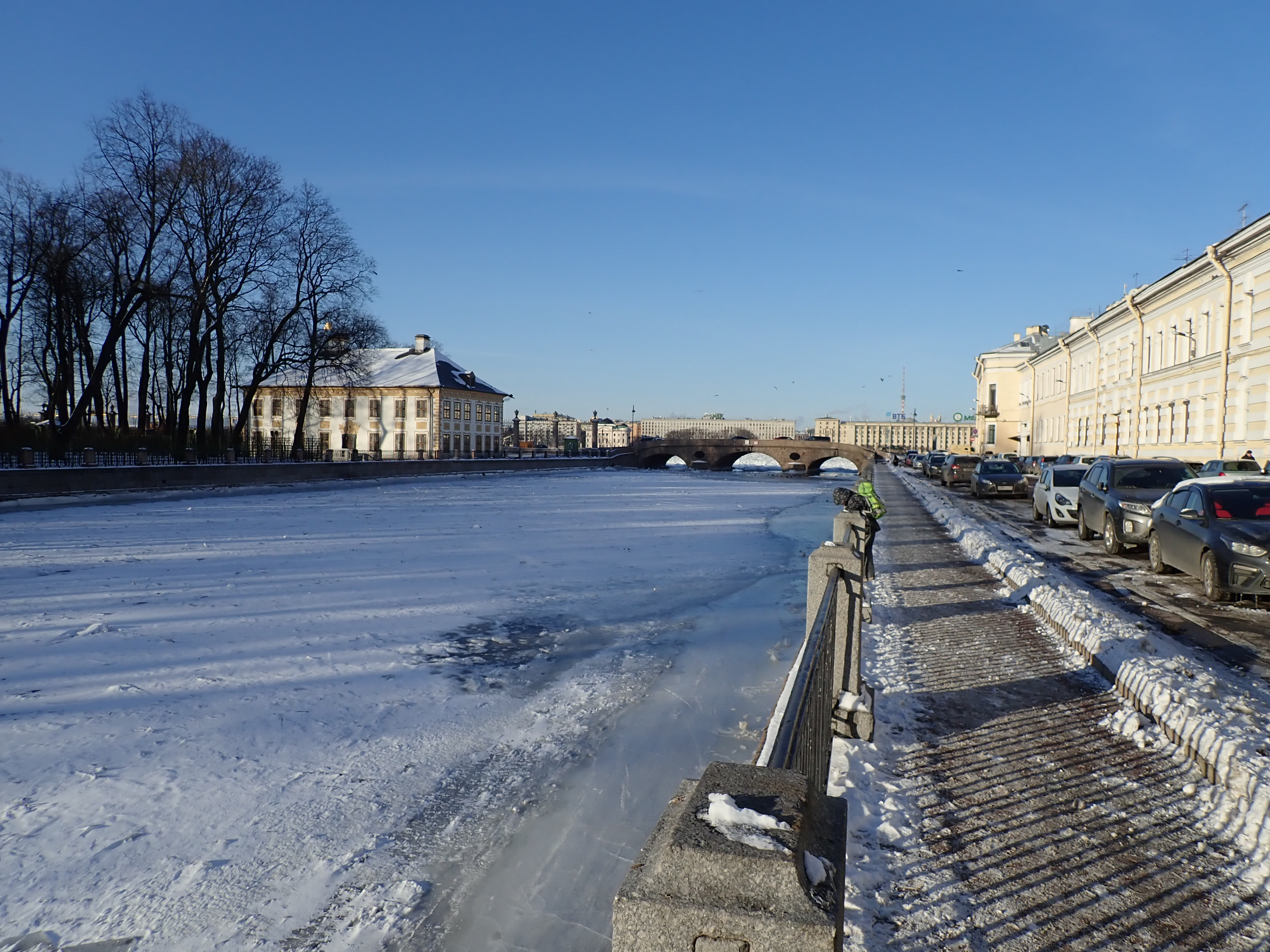
Embankment of the Fontanka River, Laundry Bridge, Summer Palace of Peter I

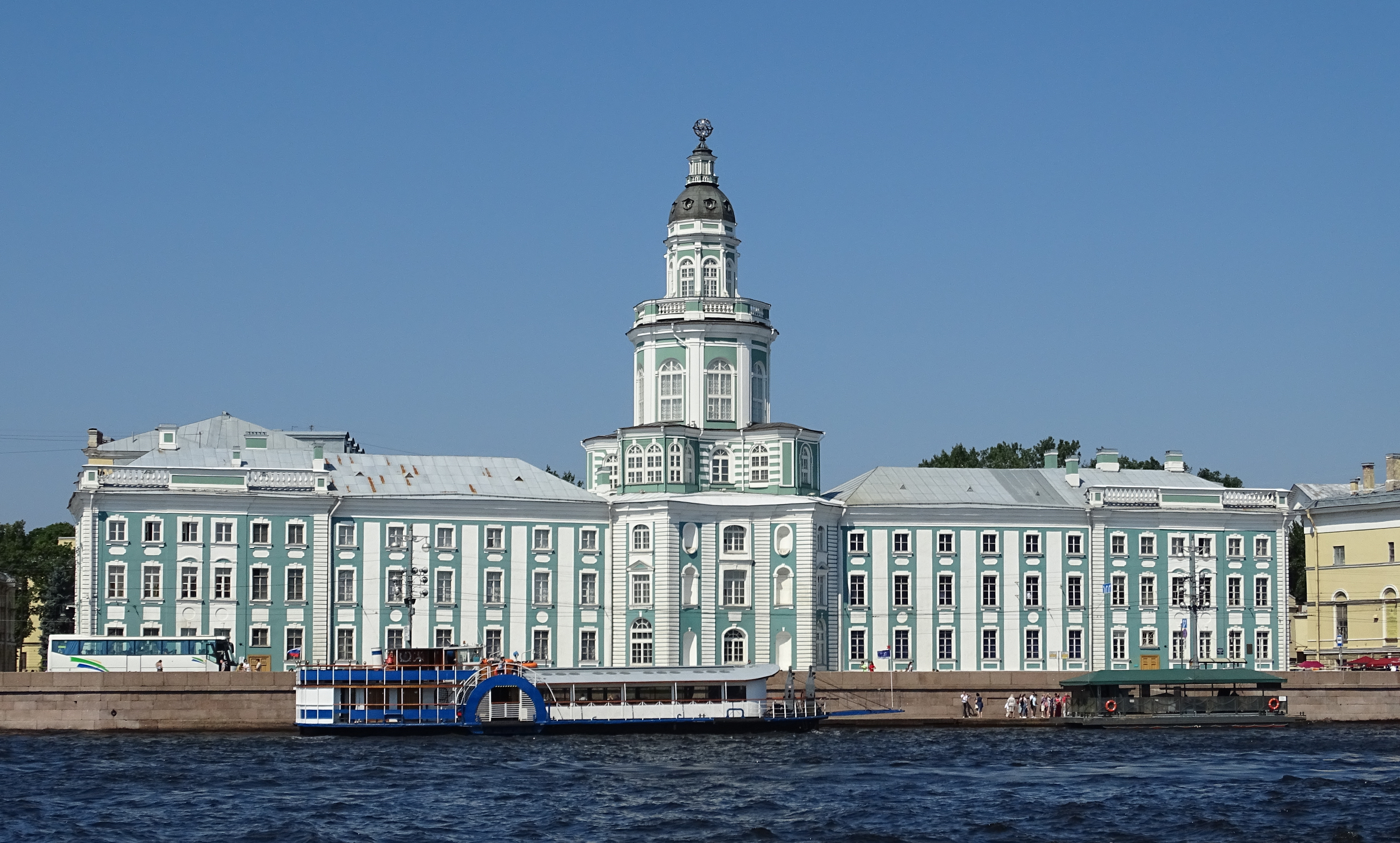
View of the Kunstkamera across the Neva

In 1698, Peter sent a delegation to Malta, under boyar Boris Sheremetev, to observe the training and abilities of the Knights of Malta and their fleet. Sheremetev investigated the possibility of future joint ventures with the Knights, including action against the Turks and the possibility of a future Russian naval base. On 12 September 1698, Peter officially founded the first Russian Navy base, Taganrog on the Sea of Azov.

In 1699, Peter changed the date of the celebration of the new year from 1 September to 1 January. Traditionally, the years were reckoned from the purported creation of the World, but after Peter's reforms, they were to be counted from the birth of Christ. Thus, in the year 7207 of the old Russian calendar, Peter proclaimed that the Julian Calendar was in effect and the year was 1700. On the death of Lefort in 1699, Menshikov succeeded him as Peter's prime favourite and confidant. Yakov Fyodorovich Dolgorukov also provided critical advice and support to the Tsar throughout his attempts at modernizing Russia.

In 1700, Peter I prevented the election of a new patriarch and deprived the Russian Church of the opportunity to regain a single spiritual leader. Reducing the number of monasteries, he converted all monasteries with less than 30 monks into schools or churches. He encouraged the development of private entrepreneurship, but under strict state control. He initiated the construction of canals by John Perry and implemented a monetary reform, using the decimal principle as the basis of the monetary system (1698–1704).

Peter attracted many foreign specialists and opened an educational institution for surgery, led by Nicolaas Bidloo. In 1701, the Moscow School of Mathematics and Navigation was founded, led by Jacob Bruce; for fifteen years, naval officers, surveyors, engineers, and gunners were educated there.

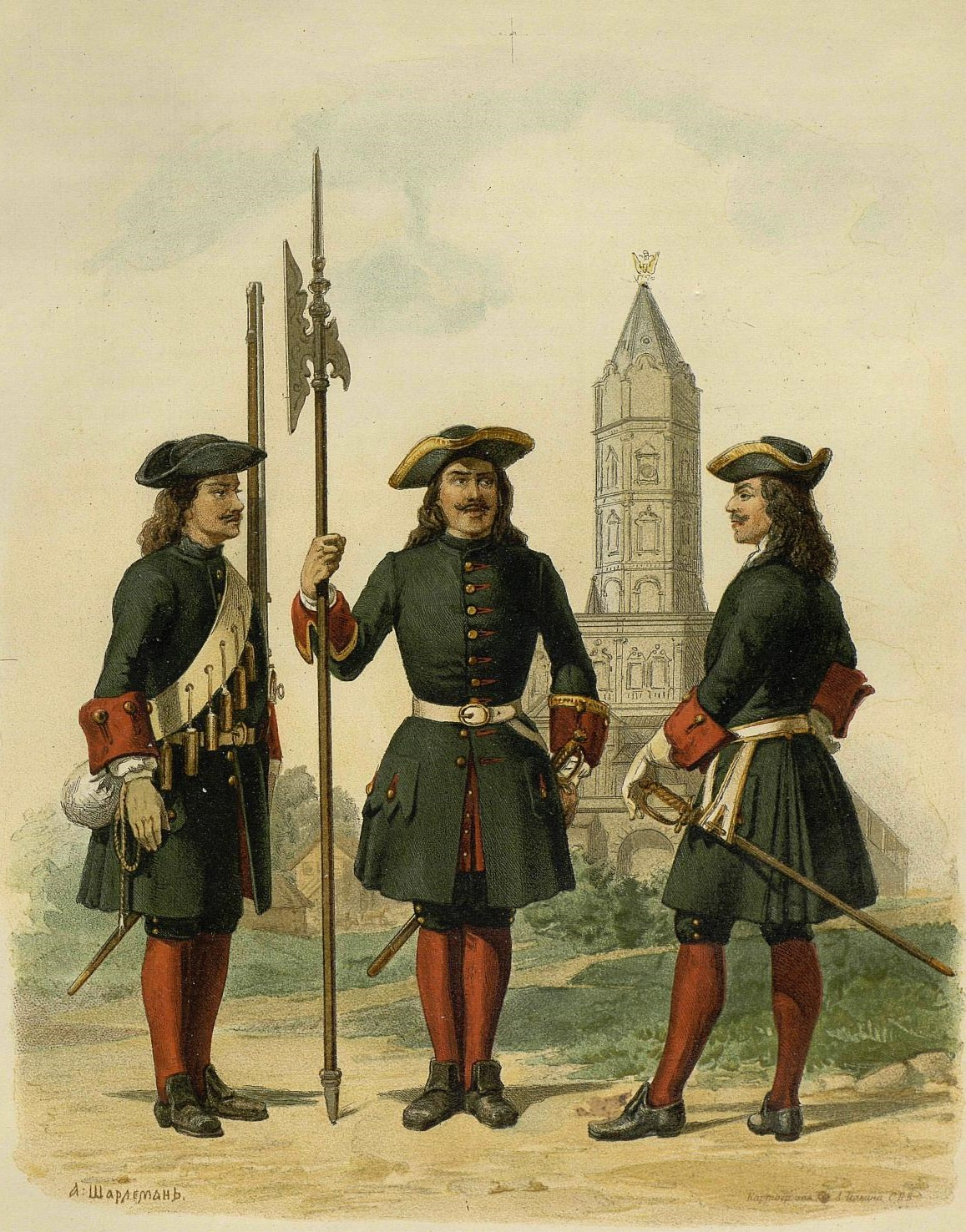
Preobrazhensky Regiment with the Sukharev tower

In 1700, Jan Thesingh (-1701) received a monopoly on printing and importing books, maps and prints into Russia for fifteen years. In 1701 he appointed Fedor Polikarpov-Orlov as head of the Moscow Print Yard. In 1707, Tsar Peter I bought a fully equipped printing house in Holland, including staff. Peter replaced the Cyrillic numerals with Arabic numerals (1705–1710) and the Cyrillic font with a civil script (1708–1710).

In 1708, Gottfried Wilhelm Leibniz became an advisor and offered to write new laws for the country. In December Russia was divided into eight governorates (guberniya). Matwei Petrowitsch Gagarin was the first governor of Siberia. Peter was visited by Cornelis de Bruijn, who spent six years in Russia and made drawings of the Kremlin. In 1711, Peter visited elector August II of Poland in Dresden, Carlsbad and Torgau where his son Aleksei married. In 1713 he visited Hamburg, sieged Tönningen with his allies. He then traveled to Hanover and was a guest of Duke Anton Ulrich of Brunswick-Wolfenbüttel in Salzdahlum. From Danzig he sailed to Riga, Helsingfors and Turku.

In 1711, Peter established by decree a new state body known as the Governing Senate. Normally, the Boyar duma would have exercised power during his absence. Peter, however, mistrusted the boyars; he instead abolished the Duma and created a Senate of ten members. The Senate was founded as the highest state institution to supervise all judicial, financial and administrative affairs. Originally established only for the time of the monarch's absence, the Senate became a permanent body after his return. A special high official, the Ober-Procurator, served as the link between the ruler and the senate and acted, in Peter own words, as "the sovereign's eye". Without his signature no Senate decision could go into effect; the Senate became one of the most important institutions of Imperial Russia.

In 1701, 1705 and 1712, Peter I issued decrees establishing an Engineering School in Sukharev Tower, which was supposed to recruit up to 100 students, but had only 23. Therefore, he issued another decree in 1714 calling for compulsory education, which dictated that all Russian 10- to 15-year-old children of the nobility, government clerks, and lesser-ranked officials must learn basic arithmetic, trigonometry and geometry, and should be tested on the subjects at the end of their studies.

Areskine, an iatrochemist, became head of the court apothecary; Johann Daniel Schumacher was appointed secretary and librarian of the Kunstkamera. The country's first scientific library was opened in his palace in the Summer Garden. Peter ordered the development of Aptekarsky Island, headquarters for the Medical Clerical Office and the Main Pharmacy. Gottlieb Schober was commissioned to examine hot springs and discovered rich deposits of sulfur; Peter immediately set up a factory for the development in the Samara Oblast. In 1721 the shipyard Petrozavod and Petrodvorets Watch Factory was established. Some 3,500 new words—German, French, Dutch, English, Italian, Swedish in origin—entered Russian in Peter's period, roughly one-fourth of them shipping and naval terms.

As part of his reforms, Peter started an industrialization effort that was slow but eventually successful. Russian manufacturing and main exports were based on the mining and lumber industries. In 1719, the privileges of miners were enshrined in law with the Berg Privilege, which allowed representatives of all classes to search for ores and build metallurgical plants. At the same time, manufacturers and artisans were exempted from state taxes and recruiting, and their houses were exempt from the post of troops. The law also guaranteed the inheritance of the ownership of factories, proclaimed industrial activity a matter of state importance and protected manufacturers from interference in their affairs by local authorities. The same law established the Collegium of Mining, and managed the entire mining and metallurgical industry, and local administrations. The Demidovs became the first Russian exporters of iron to Western Europe. In 1721, a decree was issued that allowed factory owners, regardless of whether they had a noble rank, to buy serfs.

=== Great Northern War ===
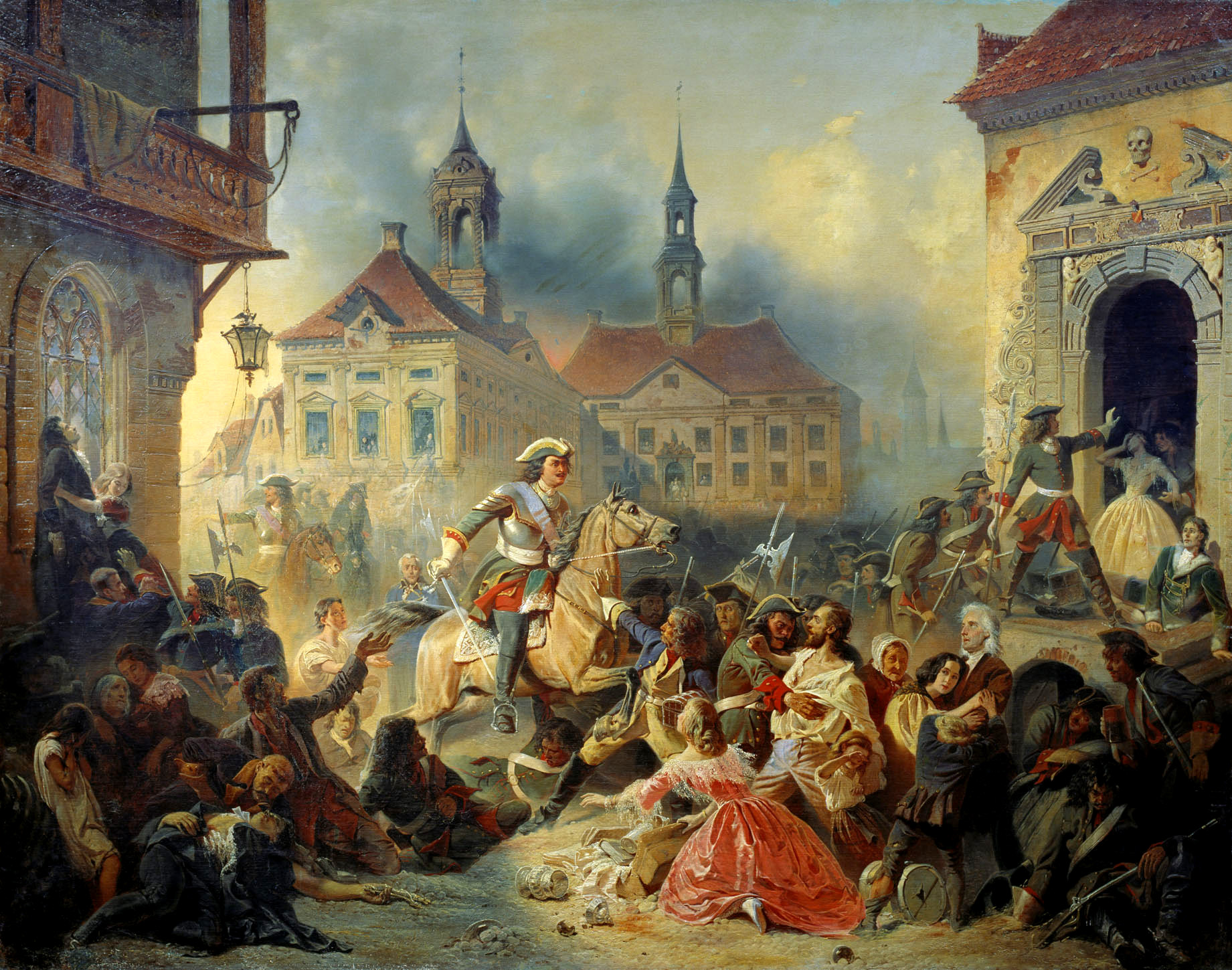
Peter I of Russia pacifies his marauding troops after retaking Narva in 1704, by Nikolay Sauerweid, 1859

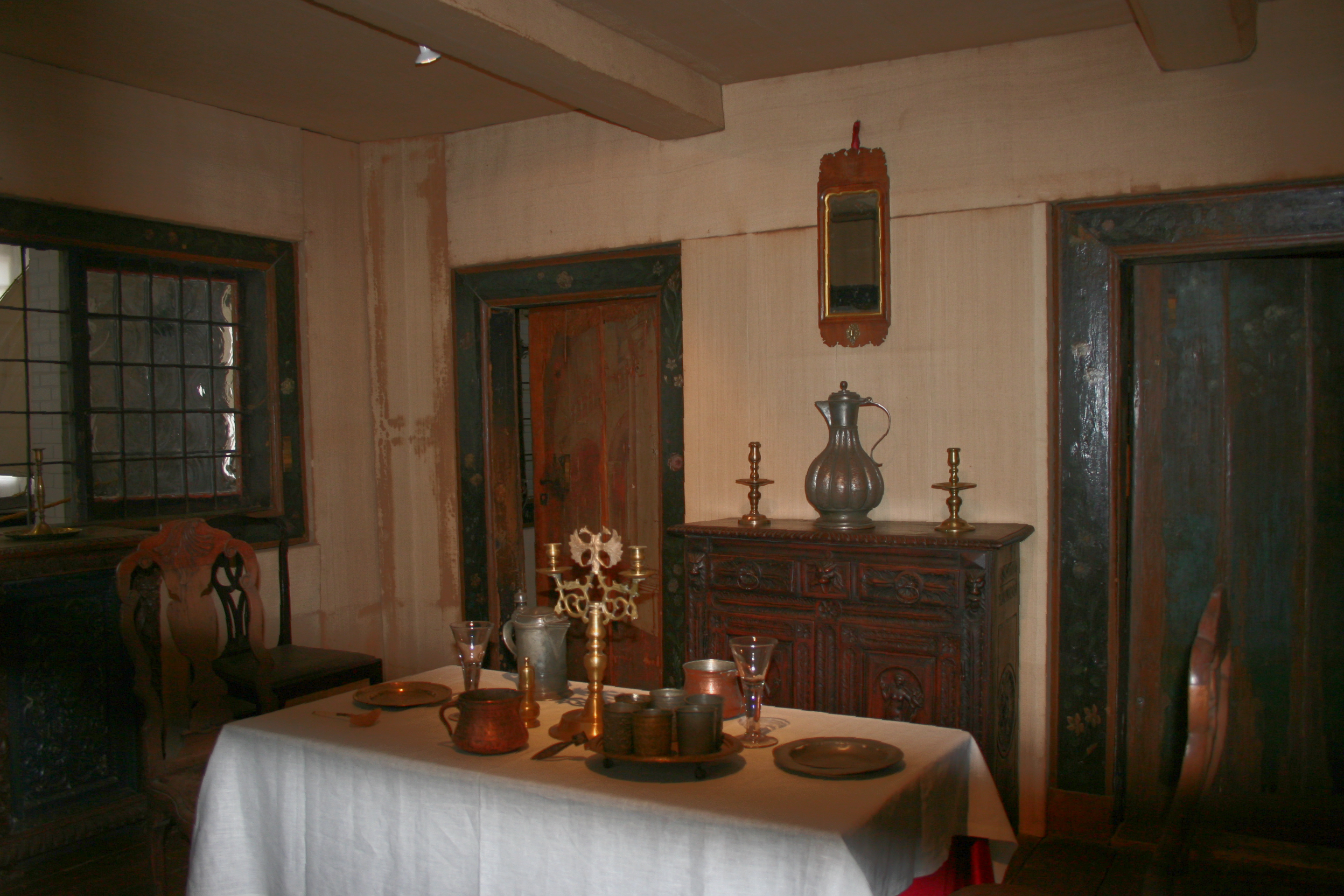
Interior of Peter's log cabin

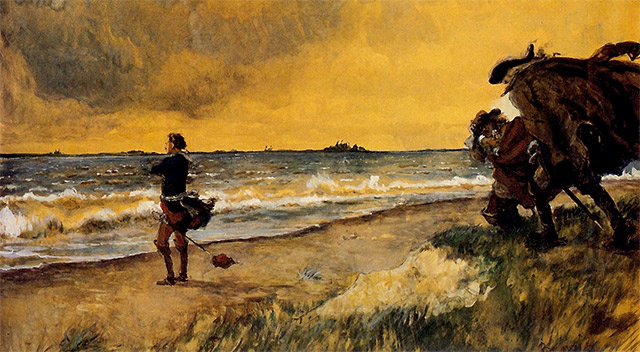
Peter the Great Meditating the Idea of Building St Petersburg at the Shore of the Baltic Sea, by Alexandre Benois, 1916

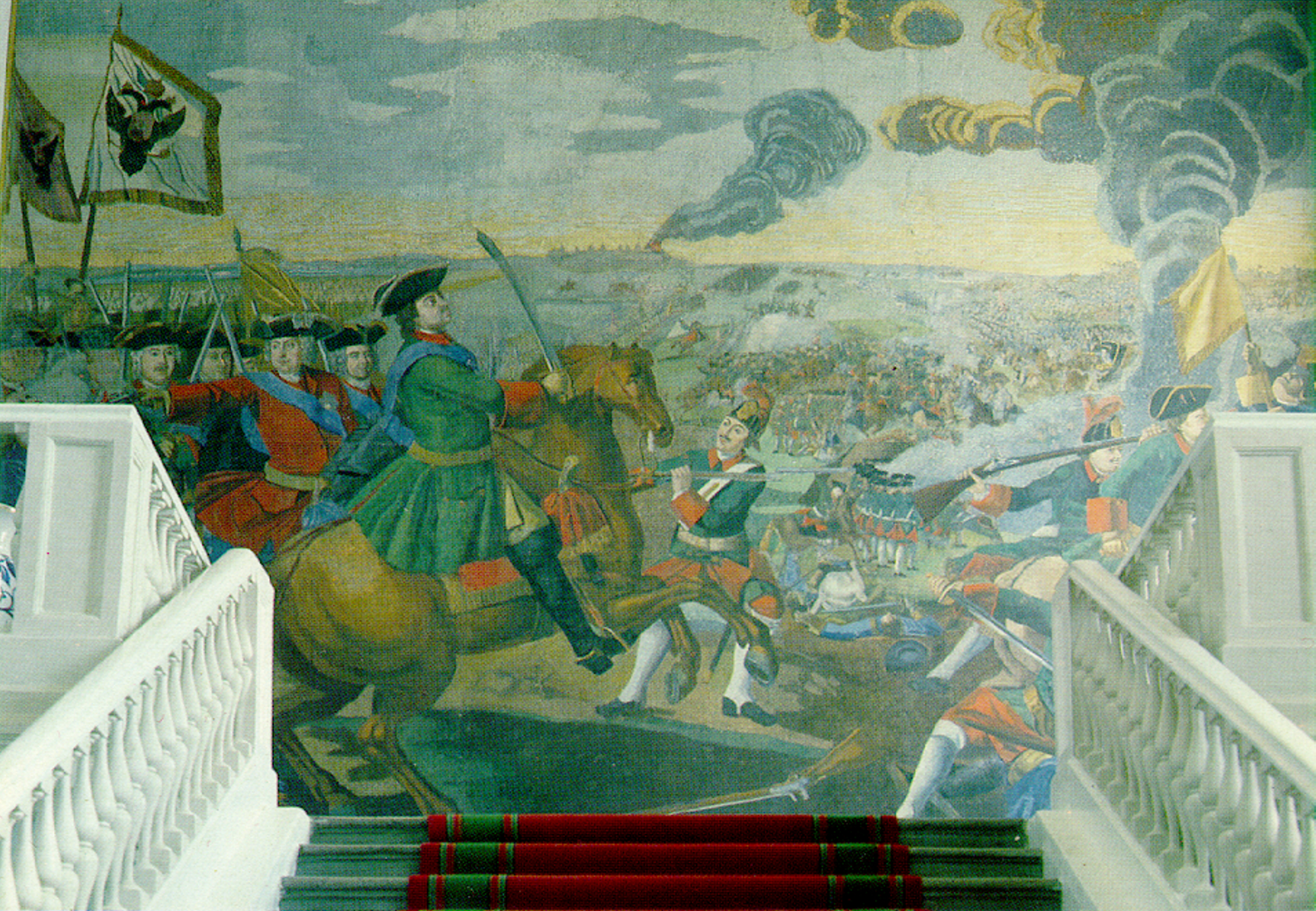
Peter I in the Battle of Poltava, a mosaic by Mikhail Lomonosov

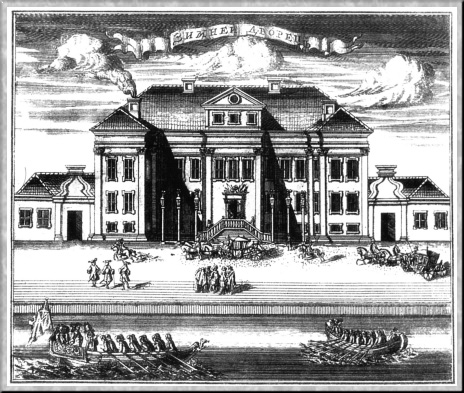
First Winter Palace by Alexey Zubov

Peter made a temporary peace with the Ottoman Empire that allowed him to keep the captured fort of Azov, and turned his attention to Russian maritime supremacy. He sought to acquire control of the Baltic Sea, which had been taken by the Swedish Empire a half-century earlier. Peter declared war on Sweden, which at the time was led by the young King Charles XII. Sweden was also opposed by Denmark–Norway, Saxony, and the Polish–Lithuanian Commonwealth. The Preobrazhensky regiment took part in all major battles of the Great Northern War.

Russia was ill-prepared to fight the Swedes, so their first attempt at seizing the Baltic coast ended in disaster at the Battle of Narva in 1700. In the battle, the army of Charles XII, instead of employing a slow methodical siege, attacked immediately using a blinding snowstorm to their advantage. After the battle, Charles XII decided to concentrate his forces against the Polish–Lithuanian Commonwealth, which gave Peter time to reorganize the Russian army and conquered Nyenschantz in the Ingrian campaign. Bidloo had to organize a military hospital. Robert Bruce was appointed commander-in-chief of St. Petersburg. After the defeat at Narva, Peter I gave the order to melt the church bells into cannons and mortars. In 1701, Peter ordered the construction of Novodvinsk Fortress north of Archangelsk. In the siege of Nöteborg Russian forces captured the Swedish fortress, renamed Shlisselburg. In 1702 Peter the Great established the Olonets Shipyard at Lodeynoye Pole, where Russian frigate Shtandart was built.

While the Poles fought the Swedes, Peter founded the city of Saint Petersburg on 29 June 1703 on Hare Island. He forbade the building of stone edifices outside Saint Petersburg, which he intended to become Russia's capital, so that all stonemasons could participate in the construction of the new city. While the city was being built along the Neva he lived in a modest three-room log cabin (with a study but without a fire-place) which had to make room for the first version of the Winter Palace. The first buildings which appeared were a shipyard at the Admiralty, Kronstadt (1704–1706) and the Peter and Paul Fortress (1706). Peter took his whole family on a boat trip to Kronstadt.

Following several defeats, Polish King Augustus II the Strong abdicated in 1706. Swedish king Charles XII turned his attention to Russia, invading it in 1708. After crossing into Russia, Charles defeated Peter at Golovchin in July. In the Battle of Lesnaya, Charles suffered his first loss after Peter crushed a group of Swedish reinforcements marching from Riga. Deprived of this aid, Charles was forced to abandon his proposed march on Moscow.

Charles XII refused to retreat to Poland or back to Sweden and instead invaded Ukraine. Peter withdrew his army southward, employing scorched earth, destroying along the way anything that could assist the Swedes. Deprived of local supplies, the Swedish army was forced to halt its advance in the winter of 1708–1709. In the summer of 1709, they resumed their efforts to capture Russian-ruled Ukraine, culminating in the Battle of Poltava on 27 June. The battle was a decisive defeat for the Swedish forces, ending Charles' campaign in Ukraine and forcing him south to seek refuge in the Ottoman Empire. Russia had defeated what was considered to be one of the world's best militaries, and the victory overturned the view that Russia was militarily incompetent. In Poland, Augustus II was restored as King.

Peter, overestimating the support he would receive from his Balkan allies, attacked the Ottoman Empire, initiating the Russo-Turkish War of 1710. Peter's campaign in the Ottoman Empire was disastrous, and in the ensuing Treaty of the Pruth, Peter was forced to return the Black Sea ports he had seized in 1697. In return, the Sultan expelled Charles XII. The Ottomans called him Mad Peter (Turkish: deli Petro), for his willingness to sacrifice large numbers of his troops in wartime.

Peter's northern armies took the Swedish province of Livonia (the northern half of modern Latvia, and the southern half of modern Estonia), driving the Swedes out of Finland. In 1714, the Russian fleet won the Battle of Gangut. During the Great Wrath most of Finland was occupied by Russian forces.

=== Second Embassy ===
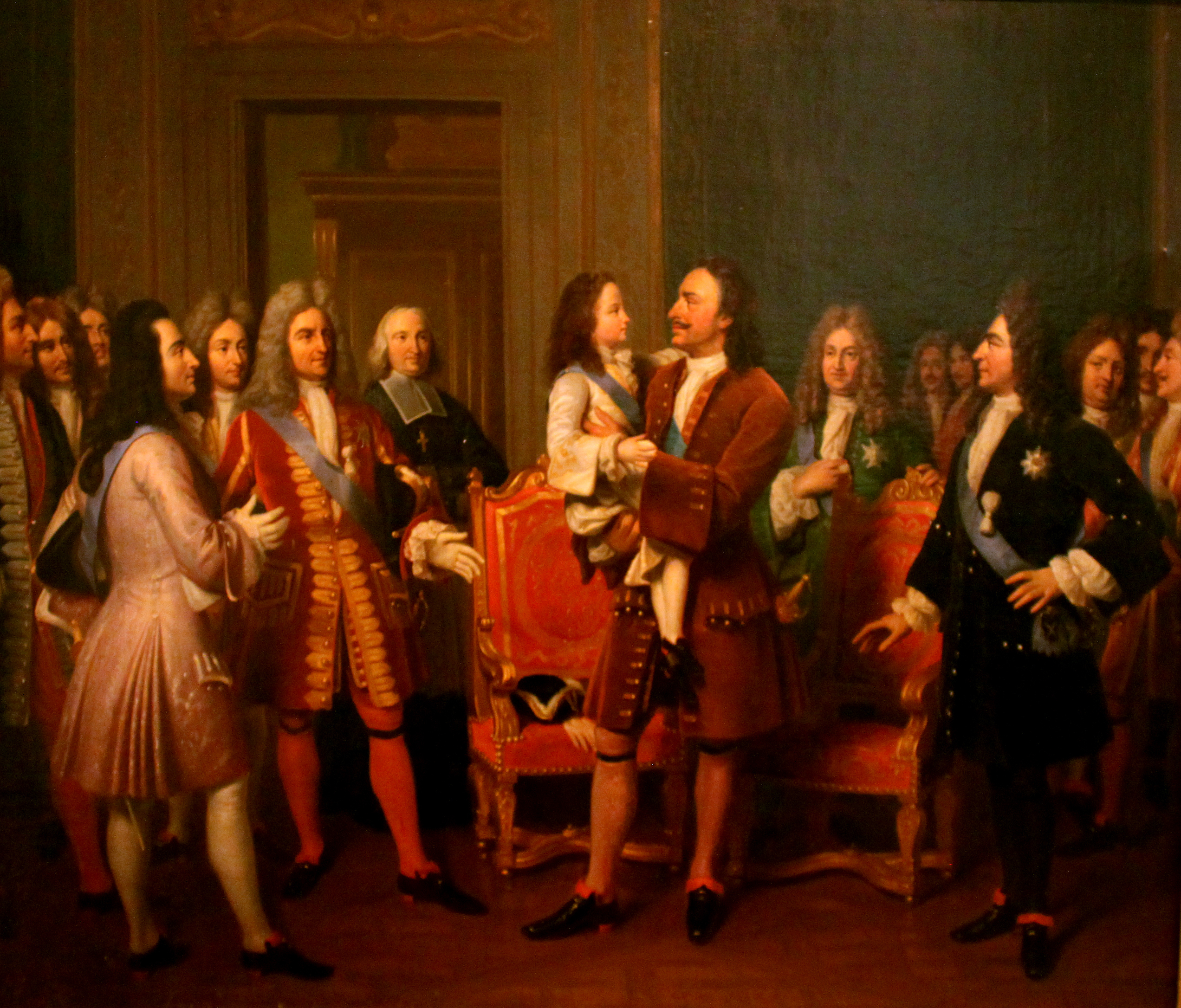
Tsar Peter the Great picks up the young King Louis XV (1717), painted around 1838

In January 1716, Tsar Peter traveled in the Baltic region to discuss peace negotiations and how to protect the sea trade route from the Swedes. He visited Riga, Königsberg and Danzig. There his niece married the quarrelsome Duke of Mecklenburg-Schwerin with which Peter wanted an alliance. He obtained the assistance of the Frederick William I of Prussia who sieged the strong Swedish fortress Wismar. In Altona he met with Danish diplomats, supporting Prussia. He sailed to Copenhagen heading an allied fleet. In Wittenberg he visited the monastery, where Luther lived. In May he went on to Bad Pyrmont, and, because of his physical problems he stayed at this spa. There he met with the genius Leibniz. Blumentrost and Areskine accompanied him.

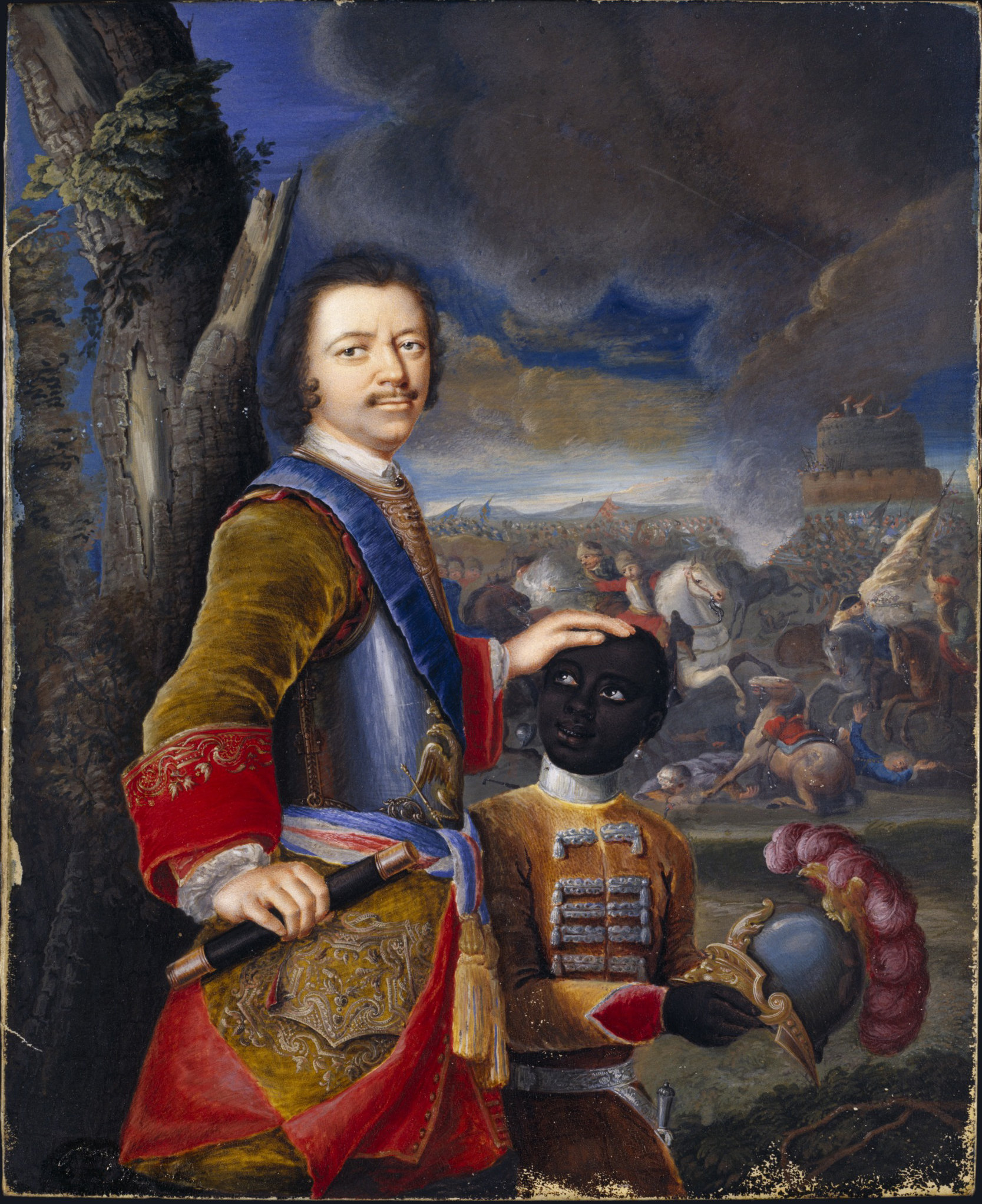
Peter the Great with a black page wearing a slave collar, by de:Gustav von Mardefeld, a Prussian diplomat, who attended the peace congress on Åland between 1717–1719

In early December Peter arrived in Amsterdam and visited Nicolaas Witsen. He bought the anatomic and herbarium collection of Frederik Ruysch, Levinus Vincent and Albertus Seba. He obtained many paintings among other from Maria Sibylla Merian for his Kunstkamera and Rembrandt's "David and Jonathan" for Peterhof Palace. He paid a visit to a friend's mansion near Nigtevecht, a silk manufacture and a paper-mill. At five in the morning he was received by Herman Boerhaave who showed Peter the Botanical Garden. In April 1717 he continued his travel to Austrian Netherlands, Dunkirk and Calais. In Paris he obtained many books, requested to become a member of the Academie de Sciences and visited the parliament, the Sorbonne and Madame Maintenon. Via the Palace of Saint-Cloud, the Grand Trianon at Versailles, Fontainebleau, Spa he travelled on to Maastricht, at that time one of the most important fortresses in Europe. He went back Amsterdam to attend a Treaty with France and Prussia on 15 August. He achieved a diplomatic success, and his international prestige, consolidated. Again he visited the Hortus Botanicus and left the city early September 1717, heading for Berlin. In October he was back in St Petersburg. In 1719 New Holland Island was created.

The tsar's navy was powerful enough that the Russians could penetrate Sweden. Still, Charles XII refused to yield, and not until his death in battle in 1718 did peace become feasible. After the battle of Grengam, Sweden made peace with all powers but Russia by 1720. In 1721, the Treaty of Nystad ended the Great Northern War. Russia acquired Ingria, Estonia, Livonia, and a substantial portion of Karelia. In turn, Russia paid two million Riksdaler and surrendered most of Finland.

=== Later years ===
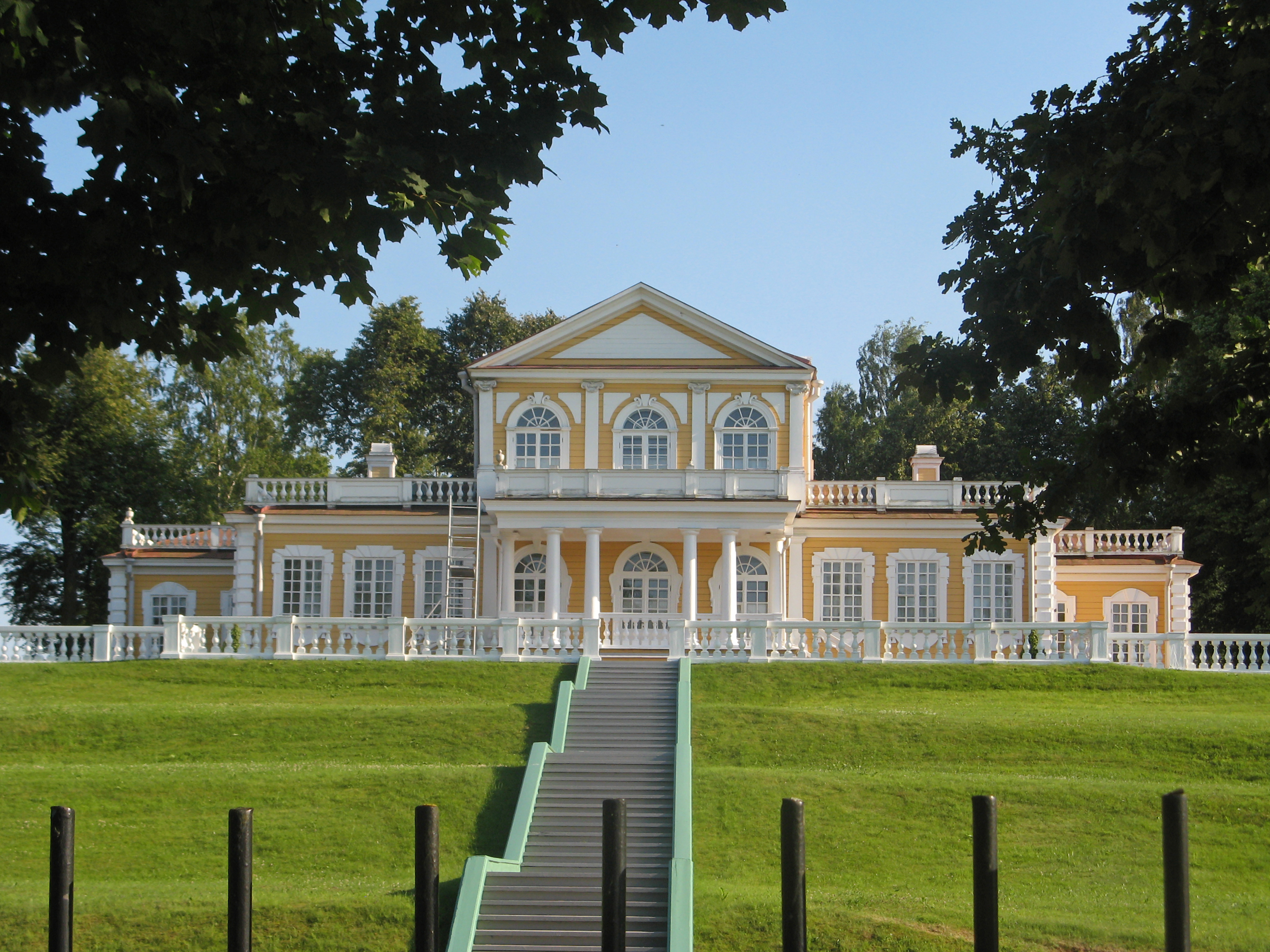
Peter I’s small wooden palace in Strelna, designed by Le Blond around 1714, had a botanical garden.

In 1717, Alexander Bekovich-Cherkassky led the first Russian military expedition into Central Asia against the Khanate of Khiva. The expedition ended in complete disaster when the entire expeditionary force was slaughtered.

To the end of 1717, the preparatory phase of administrative reform in Russia was completed. After 1718, Peter established collegiums in place of the old central agencies of government, including foreign affairs, war, navy, expense, income, justice, and inspection. Later others were added, to regulate mining and industry. Each college consisted of a president, a vice-president, a number of councilors and assessors, and a procurator. Some foreigners were included in various colleges but not as president. Pavel Yaguzhinsky was entrusted with the observation of the "soonest possible establishment of colleges by their presidents". Peter did not have enough loyal, talented or educated persons to put in full charge of the various departments. Peter preferred to rely on groups of individuals who would keep check on one another. Decisions depended on the majority vote.

In 1718, Peter investigated why the formerly Swedish province of Livonia was so orderly. He discovered that the Swedes spent as much administering Livonia (300 times smaller than his empire) as he spent on the entire Russian bureaucracy. He was forced to dismantle the province's government. In June 1721 he had Gagarin, the governor of Siberia, executed.

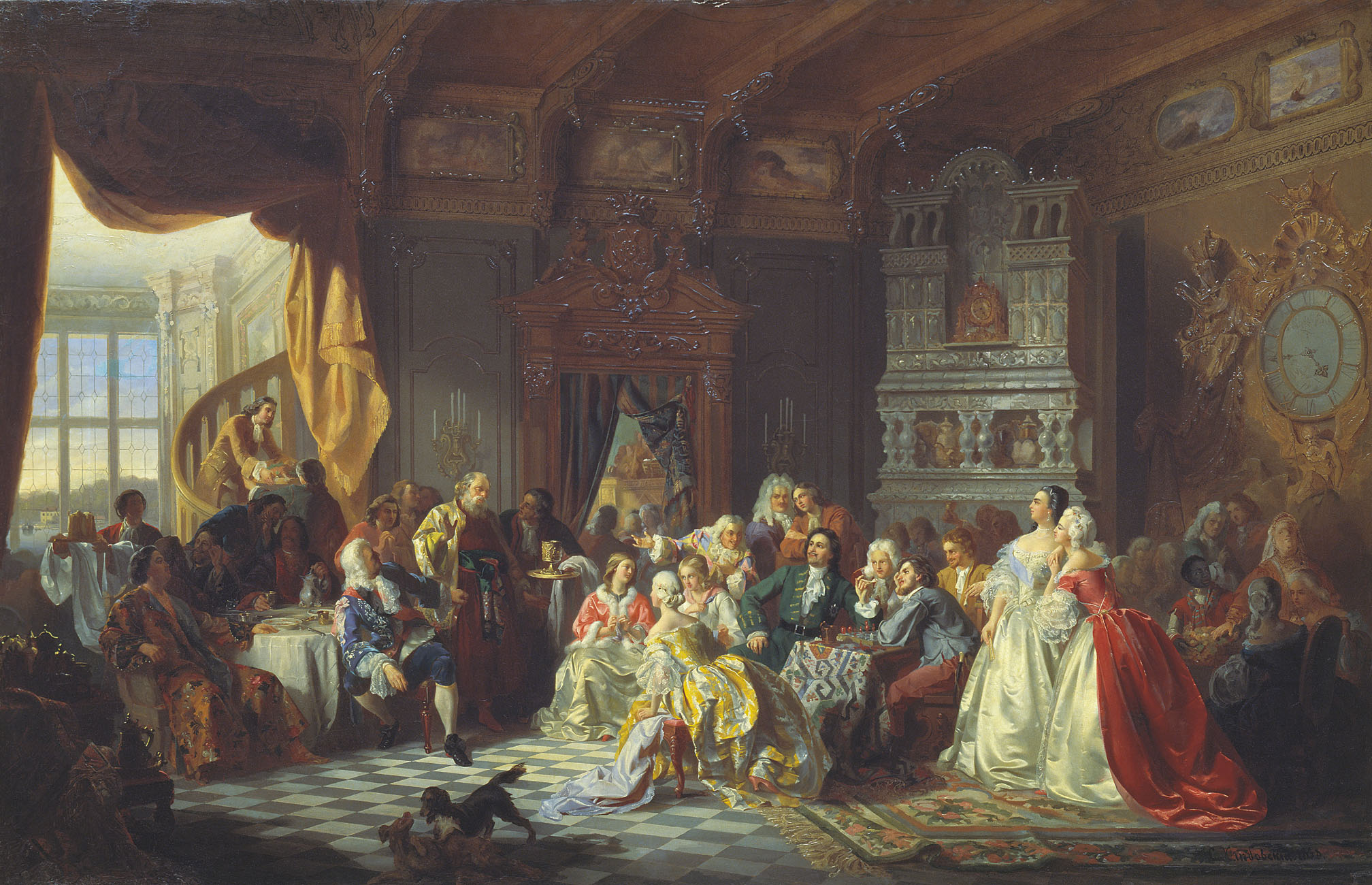
Peter the Great's Assembly in 1718 by Stanisław Chlebowski

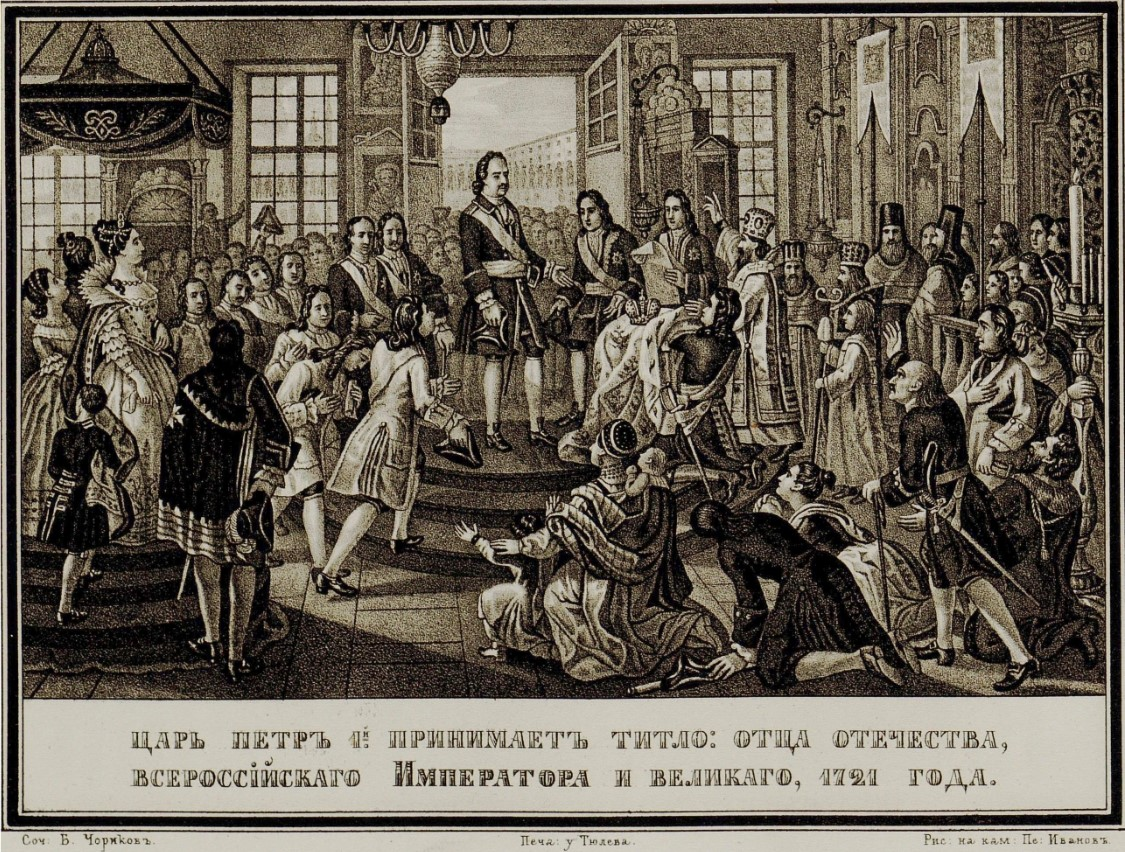
Peter I being titulated as the emperor of Russia (1721) by Boris Chorikov

Peter's last years were marked by further reform in Russia. On 2 November 1721 (N.S.), soon after peace was made with Sweden, he was officially proclaimed Emperor of All Russia. The coronation of the Russian monarch took place in Uspensky Cathedral, Moscow. Some proposed that he take the title Emperor of the East, but he refused. Gavrila Golovkin, the State Chancellor, was the first to add "the Great, Father of His Country, Emperor of All the Russias" to Peter's traditional title of tsar following a speech by Theophan Prokopovich in 1721. Peter's imperial title was recognized by Augustus II of Poland, Frederick William I of Prussia, and Frederick I of Sweden, but not by the other European monarchs. In the minds of many, the word emperor connoted superiority or pre-eminence over kings. Several rulers feared that Peter would claim authority over them, just as the Holy Roman Emperor had claimed suzerainty over all Christian nations.

By the grace of God, the most excellent and great sovereign emperor Pyotr Alekseevich the ruler of all the Russias: of Moscow, of Kiev, of Vladimir, of Novgorod, Tsar of Kazan, Tsar of Astrakhan and Tsar of Siberia, sovereign of Pskov, great prince of Smolensk, of Tver, of Yugorsk, of Perm, of Vyatka, of Bulgaria and others, sovereign and great prince of the Novgorod Lower lands, of Chernigov, of Ryazan, of Rostov, of Yaroslavl, of Belozersk, of Udora, of Kondia and the sovereign of all the northern lands, and the sovereign of the Iverian lands, of the Kartlian and Georgian Kings, of the Kabardin lands, of the Circassian and Mountain princes and many other states and lands western and eastern here and there and the successor and sovereign and ruler.

In 1722, Peter issued a Decree on the succession to the throne, in which he abolished the ancient custom of transferring the throne to direct descendants in the male line (as he had no son). The decree was so unusual for Russian society that it was necessary to explain it. Peter created a new order of precedence for landowners known as the Table of Ranks. Formerly, precedence had been determined by birth. To deprive the Boyars of their high positions, Peter directed that precedence should be determined by merit and service to the Emperor. The Table of Ranks continued to remain in effect until the Russian monarchy was overthrown in 1917.

In 1722, John Bell accompanied Peter the Great on a military expedition to the city of Derbent near the Caspian Sea. The once powerful Persian Safavid Empire to the south was in deep decline. Taking advantage of the profitable situation, Peter launched the Russo-Persian War of 1722–1723, otherwise known as "The Persian Expedition of Peter the Great", which drastically increased Russian influence for the first time in the Caucasus and Caspian Sea region, and prevented the Ottoman Empire from making territorial gains in the region. After considerable success and the capture of many provinces and cities in the Caucasus and northern mainland Persia, the Safavids were forced to hand over territory to Russia, comprising Derbent, Shirvan, Gilan, Mazandaran, Baku, and Astrabad. Within twelve years all the territories were ceded back to Persia, now led by the charismatic military genius Nader Shah, as part of the Treaty of Resht, the Treaty of Ganja, and as the result of a Russo-Persian alliance against the Ottoman Empire, which was the common enemy of both.

Peter changed the system of direct taxation. He abolished the land tax and household tax and replaced them with a poll tax. The taxes on land and on households were payable only by individuals who owned property or maintained families. The new head taxes were payable by serfs and paupers. Peter began construction of the Monplaisir Palace based on his own sketches. He ordered to purchase 2,000 lime trees which were shipped to St Petersburg. In 1725, the construction of Peterhof, a palace near Saint Petersburg, was completed. Peterhof was a grand residence, becoming known as the "Russian Versailles".

== Illness and death ==
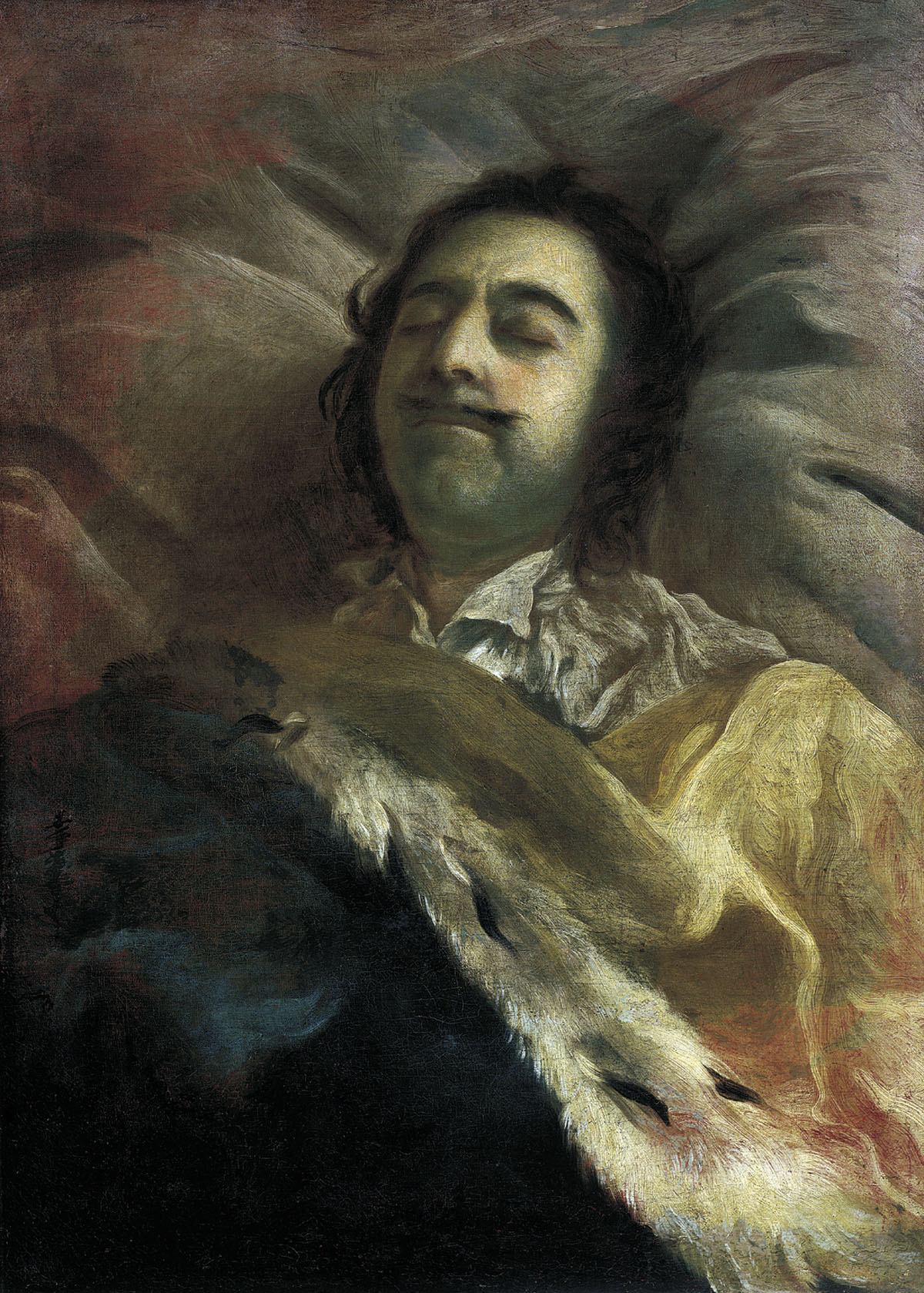
Peter the Great on his deathbed, by Nikitin

In the winter of 1723, Peter, whose overall health was never robust, began having problems with his urinary tract and bladder. In the summer of 1724, a team of doctors performed surgery releasing upwards of four pounds of blocked urine. Peter remained bedridden until late autumn. In the first week of October, restless and certain he was cured, Peter began a lengthy inspection tour of various projects. Rastrelli finished his monument to Peter I. According to legend, in November, at Lakhta along the Gulf of Finland to inspect some ironworks, Peter saw a group of soldiers drowning near shore and, wading out into near-waist deep water, came to their rescue. This icy water rescue is said to have exacerbated Peter's bladder problems and caused his death. The story, however, has been viewed with skepticism by some historians, pointing out that the German chronicler Jacob von Staehlin is the only source for the story.

In early January 1725, Peter was struck once again with uremia or azotemia. Legend has it that before lapsing into unconsciousness Peter asked for a paper and pen and scrawled an unfinished note that read: "Leave all to ..." and then, exhausted by the effort, asked for his daughter Anna to be summoned. (Note: The 'Leave all ..." story first appears in H-F de Bassewitz Russkii arkhiv 3 (1865). The Russian historian E.V. Anisimov contends that Bassewitz's aim was to convince readers that Anna, not Empress Catherine, was Peter's intended heir.)

Peter died between four and five in the morning 8 February. An autopsy revealed his bladder to be infected with gangrene. He was fifty-two years, seven months old when he died, having reigned forty-two years. He is interred in Saints Peter and Paul Cathedral.

After his death, students came to the Military College with a request to "leave science" under the pretext of "unconsciousness and incomprehensibility."

== Religion ==
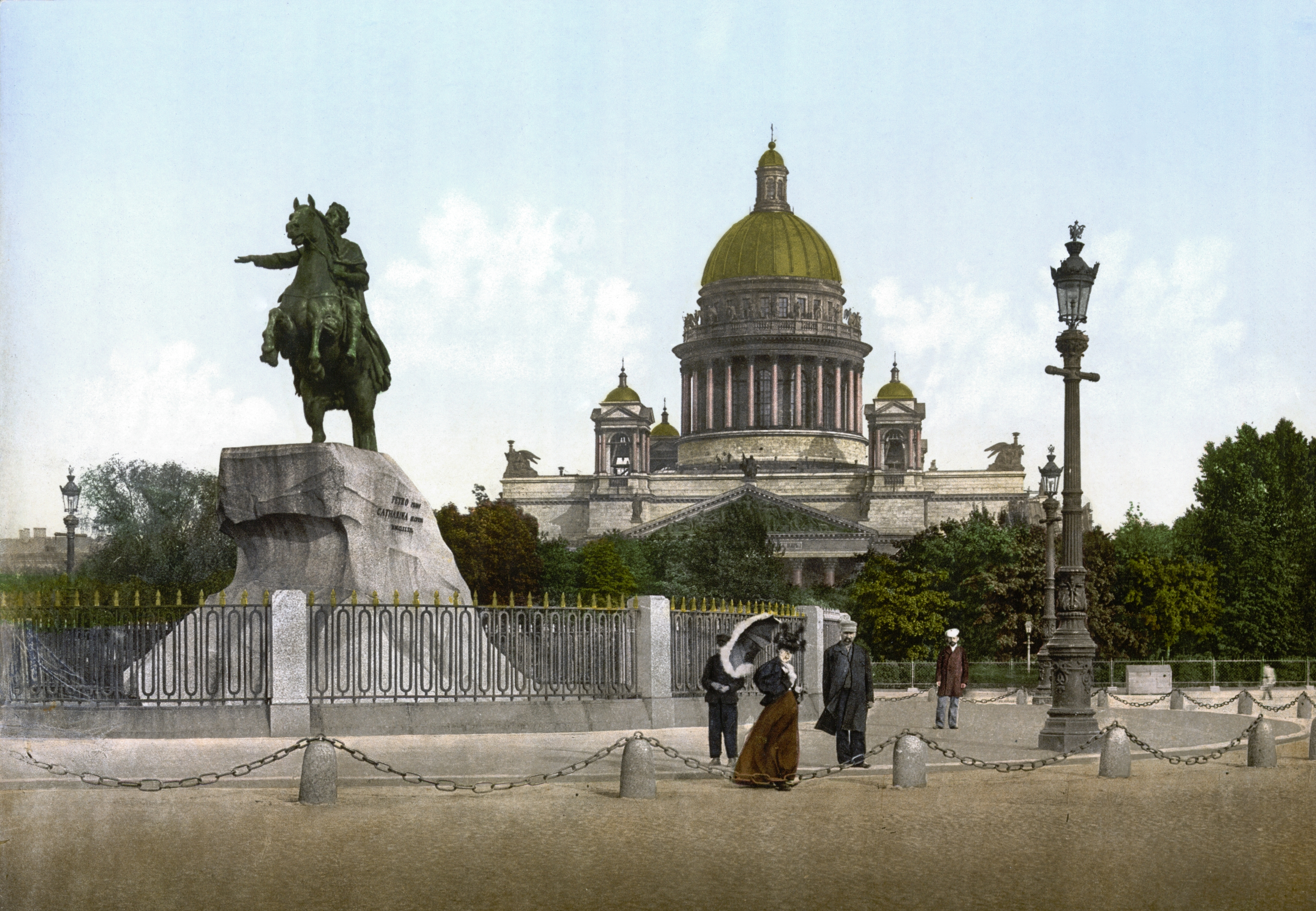
The 1782 statue of Peter I in Saint Petersburg, informally known as the Bronze Horseman. Saint Isaac's Cathedral is in the background.

Peter had a great interest in dissenters and visited gatherings of Quakers and Mennonites. He did not believe in miracles and founded The All-Joking, All-Drunken Synod of Fools and Jesters, an organization that mocked the Orthodox and Catholic Church, when he was eighteen. In January 1695, Peter refused to partake in a traditional Russian Orthodox Epiphany Ceremony, and would often schedule events for The All-Joking, All-Drunken Synod of Fools and Jesters to directly conflict with the Church. He often used the nickname Pakhom Mikhailov (Russian: Пахом Михайлов) among the ministers of religion who made up his relatively close circle of long-term drinking companions.

Peter was brought up in the Russian Orthodox faith, but he had low regard for the Church hierarchy, which he kept under tight governmental control. The traditional leader of the Church was the Patriarch of Moscow. In 1700, when the office fell vacant, Peter refused to name a replacement, allowing the patriarch's coadjutor (or deputy) to discharge the duties of the office. Peter could not tolerate the patriarch exercising power superior to the tsar, as indeed had happened in the case of Philaret (1619–1633) and Nikon (1652–66). The Alexander Nevsky Lavra was constructed between 1710–1712; Saints Peter and Paul Cathedral between 1712–1733. In 1716 he invited Theophan Prokopovich, a pietist and astronomer, to come to the capital. The Ecclesiastical Regulations of 1721 are based on the ideas of August Hermann Francke. The Church reform of Peter the Great therefore abolished the patriarchate, replacing it with a Holy Synod that was under the control of a Procurator.

In 1721, Peter followed the advice of Prokopovich in designing the Holy Synod as a council of ten clergymen. For leadership in the Church, Peter turned increasingly to Ukrainians, who were more open to reform, but were not well loved by the Russian clergy. Peter implemented a law that stipulated that no Russian man could join a monastery before the age of fifty. He felt that too many able Russian men were being wasted on clerical work when they could be joining his new and improved army.

== Marriages and family ==
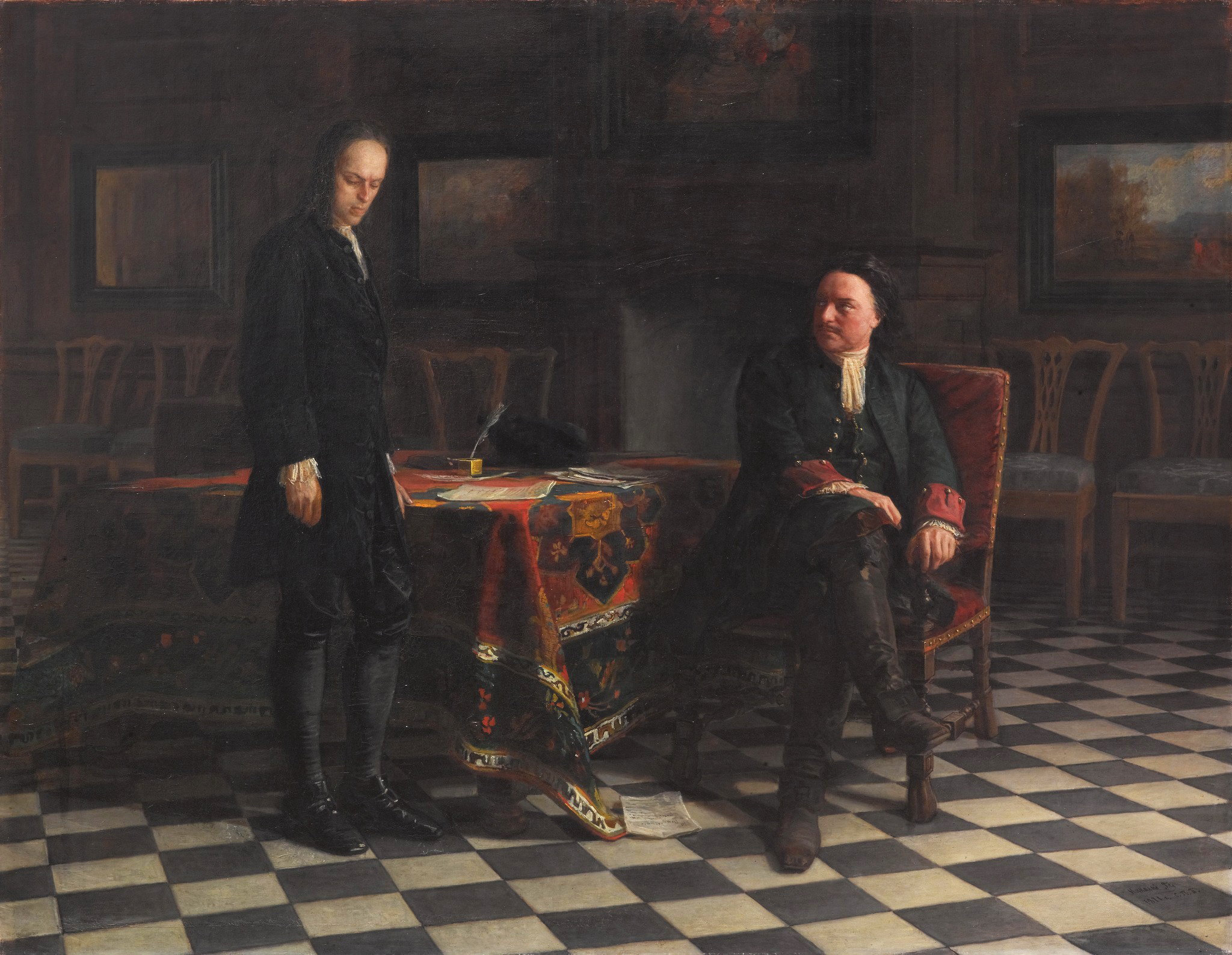
Peter the Great Interrogating the Tsarevich Alexei Petrovich at Peterhof, a painting by Nikolai Ge (1871)

Peter the Great had two wives, with whom he had fifteen children, three of whom survived to adulthood. Peter's mother selected his first wife, Eudoxia Lopukhina, when he was only 16. This was consistent with previous Romanov tradition by choosing a daughter of a minor noble. This was done to prevent fighting between the stronger noble houses and to bring fresh blood into the family. Upon his return from his European tour in 1698, Peter sought to end his unhappy marriage. He divorced the tsaritsa and forced her to join a convent. She had borne him three children, although only one, Alexei Petrovich, Tsarevich of Russia, survived past his childhood.

Menshikov introduced him to Marta Helena Skowrońska, the daughter of a Polish-Lithuanian peasant, and took her as a mistress some time between 1702 and 1704. Marta converted to the Russian Orthodox Church and was given the name Catherine. Though no record exists, Catherine and Peter married secretly between 23 October and 1 December 1707 in St. Petersburg. Peter valued Catherine and married officially, at Saint Isaac's Cathedral on 19 February 1712.

In 1718, his son Alexei Petrovich, whom he regarded as the rebellious Absalom, was locked up in the Peter and Paul fortress. He was suspected of being involved in a plot to overthrow the Emperor. Alexei was tried and confessed under torture during questioning conducted by a secular court (count Tolstoy). He was convicted and sentenced to be executed. The sentence of high treason could only be carried out with Peter's signed authorization, and Alexei died in prison, as Peter hesitated before making the decision. Alexei's death most likely resulted from injuries suffered during his torture. Alexei's mother Eudoxia was punished. She was dragged from her home, tried on false charges of adultery, publicly flogged, and confined in monasteries while being forbidden to be talked to.

In 1724, Peter had his second wife, Catherine, crowned as Empress, although he remained Russia's actual ruler.

=== Issue ===
By his two wives, he had fifteen children: three by Eudoxia and twelve by Catherine. These included four sons named Pavel and three sons named Peter, all of whom died in infancy. Only three of his children survived to adulthood. He had only three grandchildren: Tsar Peter II and Grand Duchess Natalia by Alexei and Tsar Peter III by Anna.

Name	Birth	Death	Notes
By Eudoxia Lopukhina
Alexei Petrovich, Tsarevich of Russia	18 February 1690	26 June 1718, age 28	Married 1711, Charlotte Christine of Brunswick-Wolfenbüttel; issue Peter II of Russia
Alexander Petrovich	13 October 1691	14 May 1692, age 7 months	
Pavel Petrovich	1693	1693	
By Catherine I
Peter Petrovich	Winter 1704	1707	Born and died before the official marriage of his parents
Paul Petrovich	October 1705	1707	Born and died before the official marriage of his parents
Catherine Petrovna	7 February 1707	7 August 1708	Born and died before the official marriage of her parents
Anna Petrovna	27 January 1708	15 May 1728	Married 1725, Karl Friedrich, Duke of Holstein-Gottorp; issue Peter III of Russia.
Elizaveta Petrovna, later Empress Elizaveta Petrovna	29 December 1709	5 January 1762	Reputedly married 1742, Alexei Razumovsky; no issue
Maria Natalia Petrovna	20 March 1713	17 May 1715	born in Riga
Margarita Petrovna	19 September 1714	7 June 1715	
Peter Petrovich	9 November 1715 (N.S.)	6 May 1719	
Pavel Petrovich	13 January 1717	14 January 1717	in Wesel
Natalia Petrovna	31 August 1718	15 March 1725	
Peter Petrovich	7 October 1723	7 October 1723	
Pavel Petrovich	1724	1724	

=== Mistresses and illegitimate children ===
- Anna Mons, from 1691 (or 1692) until 1704.
- Letitia Cross in 1698
- Lady Mary Hamilton
  - Miscarriage (1715)
  - Unnamed child (1717–1718?)
- Princess Maria Dmitrievna Cantemirovna of Moldavia, daughter of Dimitrie Cantemir
  - Unnamed son (1722–1723?)

== Legacy ==
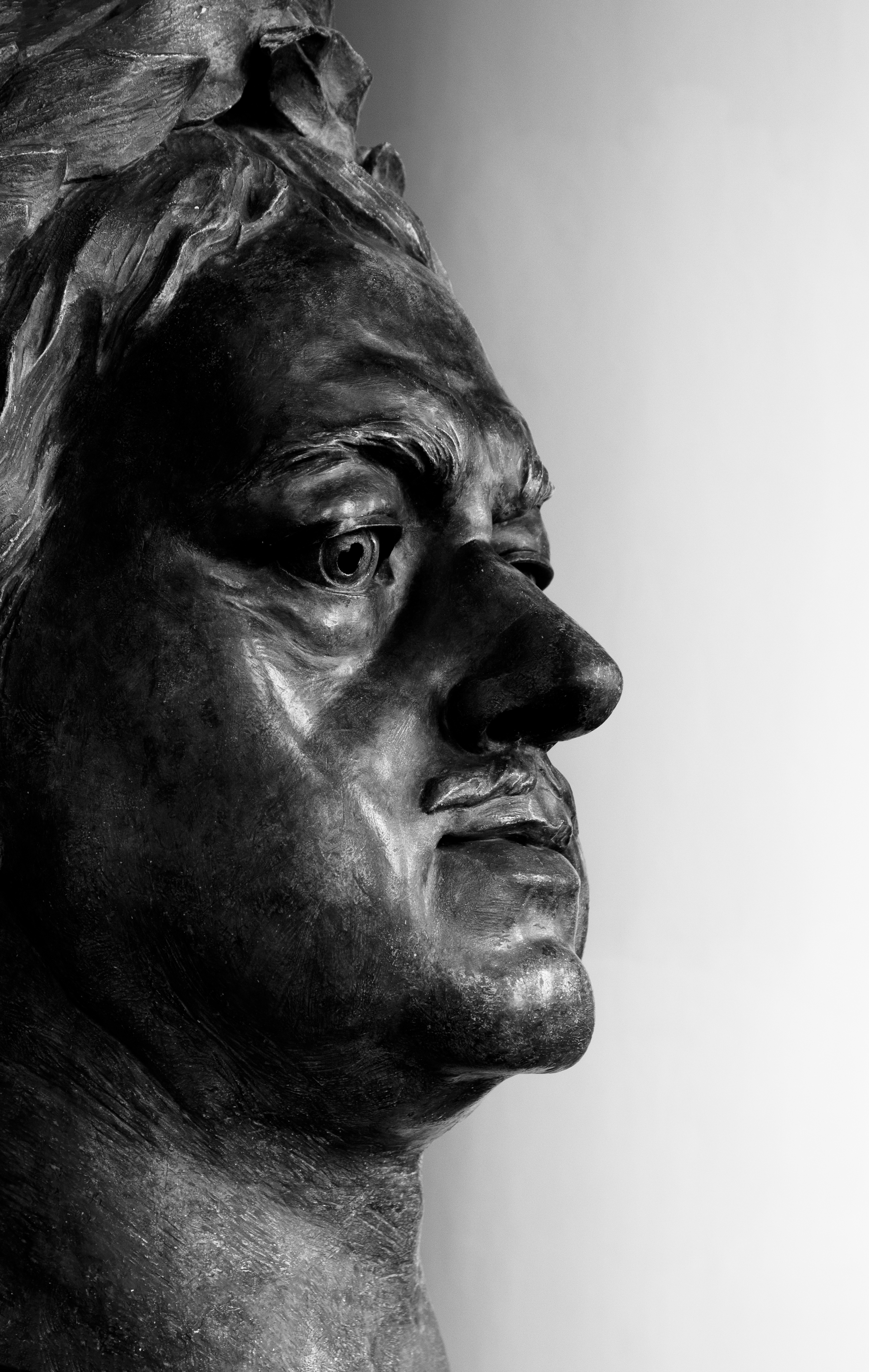
Head (original) of the model after which the monument by Falconet was cast in gypsum by Marie-Anne Collot. Russian Museum, Saint-Petersburg.

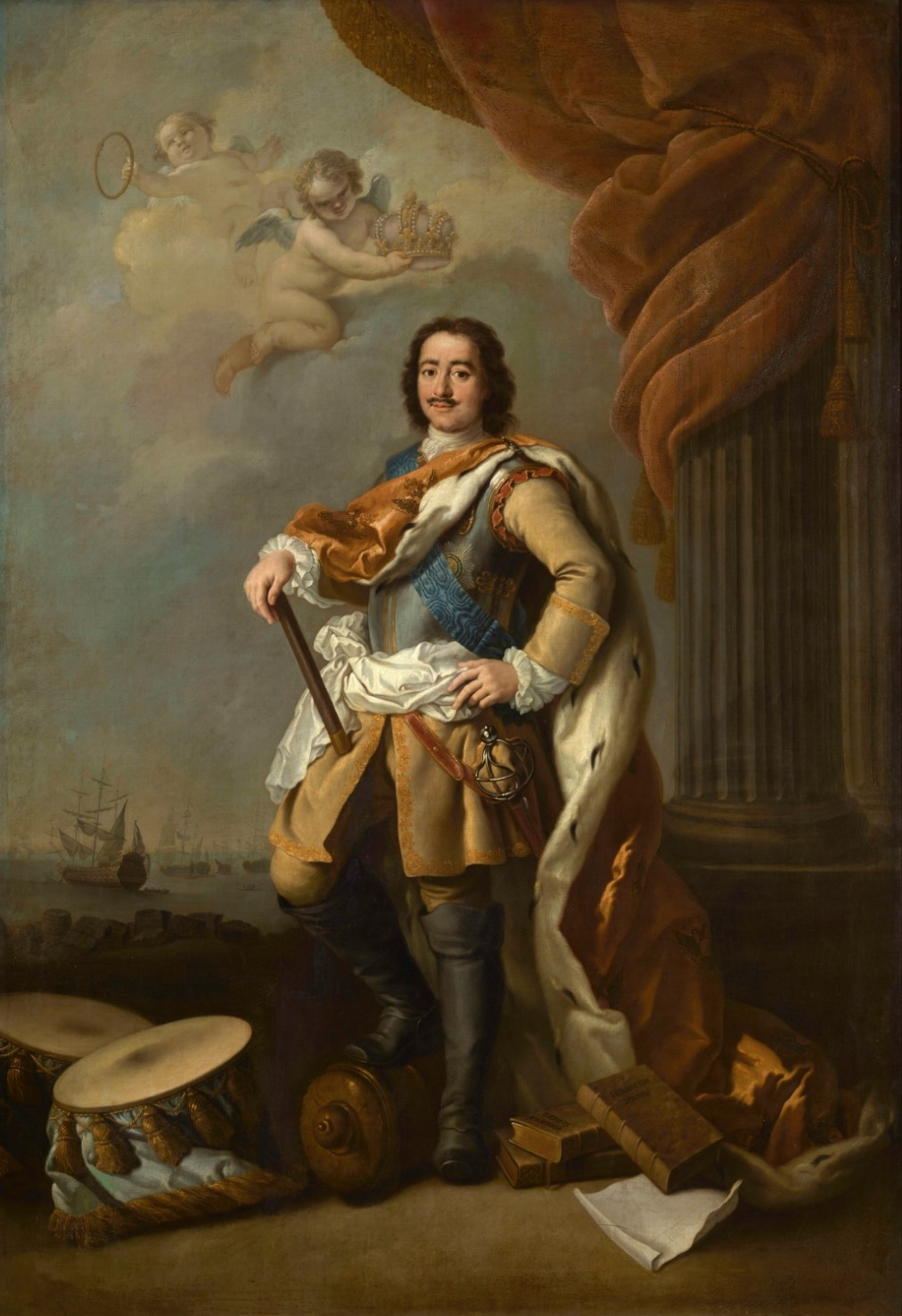
Portrait of Peter by Pyotr Drozhdin (1795). Peter is depicted with the Order of St. Andrew (ribbon and star). The portrait was donated by Catherine the Great in 1795 to the Alexander Nevsky Lavra, from where it entered the Russian Museum.

Peter's legacy has always been a major concern of Russian intellectuals. Peter is a more complex character than he is sometimes given credit for. Some believe Peter's reforms divided the country socially and weakened it spiritually. Riasanovsky points to a "paradoxical dichotomy" in the black and white images such as God/Antichrist, educator/ignoramus, architect of Russia's greatness/destroyer of national culture, father of his country/scourge of the common man. For Old Believers he was the Antichrist, because of the calendar changes and poll tax. Peter compared himself with King David or Noah with a divine mission. At his funeral Prokopovich compared him with Moses and Solomon. Voltaire's 1759 biography gave 18th-century Russians a man of the Enlightenment, while Alexander Pushkin's "The Bronze Horseman" poem of 1833 gave a powerful romantic image of a creator-god. Slavophiles in mid-19th century deplored Peter's westernization of Russia.

Western writers and political analysts recounted The Will of Peter the Great. It supposedly revealed his grand evil plot for Russia to control the world via conquest of Constantinople, Afghanistan and India. It was a forgery made in Paris at Napoleon's command when he started the invasion of Russia in 1812. Nevertheless, it is still quoted in foreign policy circles.

The Communists executed the last Romanovs, and their historians such as Mikhail Pokrovsky presented strongly negative views of the entire dynasty. Stalin however admired how Peter strengthened the state, and wartime, diplomacy, industry, higher education, and government administration. Stalin wrote in 1928, "when Peter the Great, who had to deal with more developed countries in the West, feverishly built works in factories for supplying the army and strengthening the country's defenses, this was an original attempt to leap out of the framework of backwardness." As a result, Soviet historiography emphasizes both the positive achievement and the negative factor of oppressing the common people.

After the fall of Communism in 1991, scholars and the general public in Russia and the West gave fresh attention to Peter and his role in Russian history. His reign is now seen as the decisive formative event in the Russian imperial past. Many new ideas have merged, such as whether he strengthened the autocratic state or whether the tsarist regime was not statist enough given its small bureaucracy. Modernization models have become contested ground.

He initiated a wide range of economic, social, political, administrative, educational and military reforms which ended the dominance of traditionalism and religion in Russia and initiated its westernization. His efforts included secularization of education, organization of administration for effective governance, enhanced use of technology, establishing an industrial economy, modernization of the army and establishment of a strong navy.

Historian Y. Vodarsky said in 1993 that Peter, "did not lead the country on the path of accelerated economic, political and social development, did not force it to 'achieve a leap' through several stages.... On the contrary, these actions to the greatest degree put a brake on Russia's progress and created conditions for holding it back for one and a half centuries!" The autocratic powers that Stalin admired appeared as a liability to Evgeny Anisimov, who complained that Peter was, "the creator of the administrative command system and the true ancestor of Stalin." In the period from 1678 to 1710, however, the population grew 2 times.

According to Encyclopaedia Britannica, "He did not completely bridge the gulf between Russia and the Western countries, but he achieved considerable progress in development of the national economy and trade, education, science and culture, and foreign policy. Russia became a great power, without whose concurrence no important European problem could thenceforth be settled. His internal reforms achieved progress to an extent that no earlier innovator could have envisaged."

While the cultural turn in historiography has downplayed diplomatic, economic and constitutional issues, new cultural roles have been found for Peter, for example in architecture (Petrine Baroque) and dress. James Cracraft argues:

The Petrine revolution in Russia—subsuming in this phrase the many military, naval, governmental, educational, architectural, linguistic, and other internal reforms enacted by Peter's regime to promote Russia's rise as a major European power—was essentially a cultural revolution, one that profoundly impacted both the basic constitution of the Russian Empire and, perforce, its subsequent development.

The iconic representations of dead saints typical for centuries of Russian visual culture suddenly give way to naturalistic portraiture.

== In popular culture ==
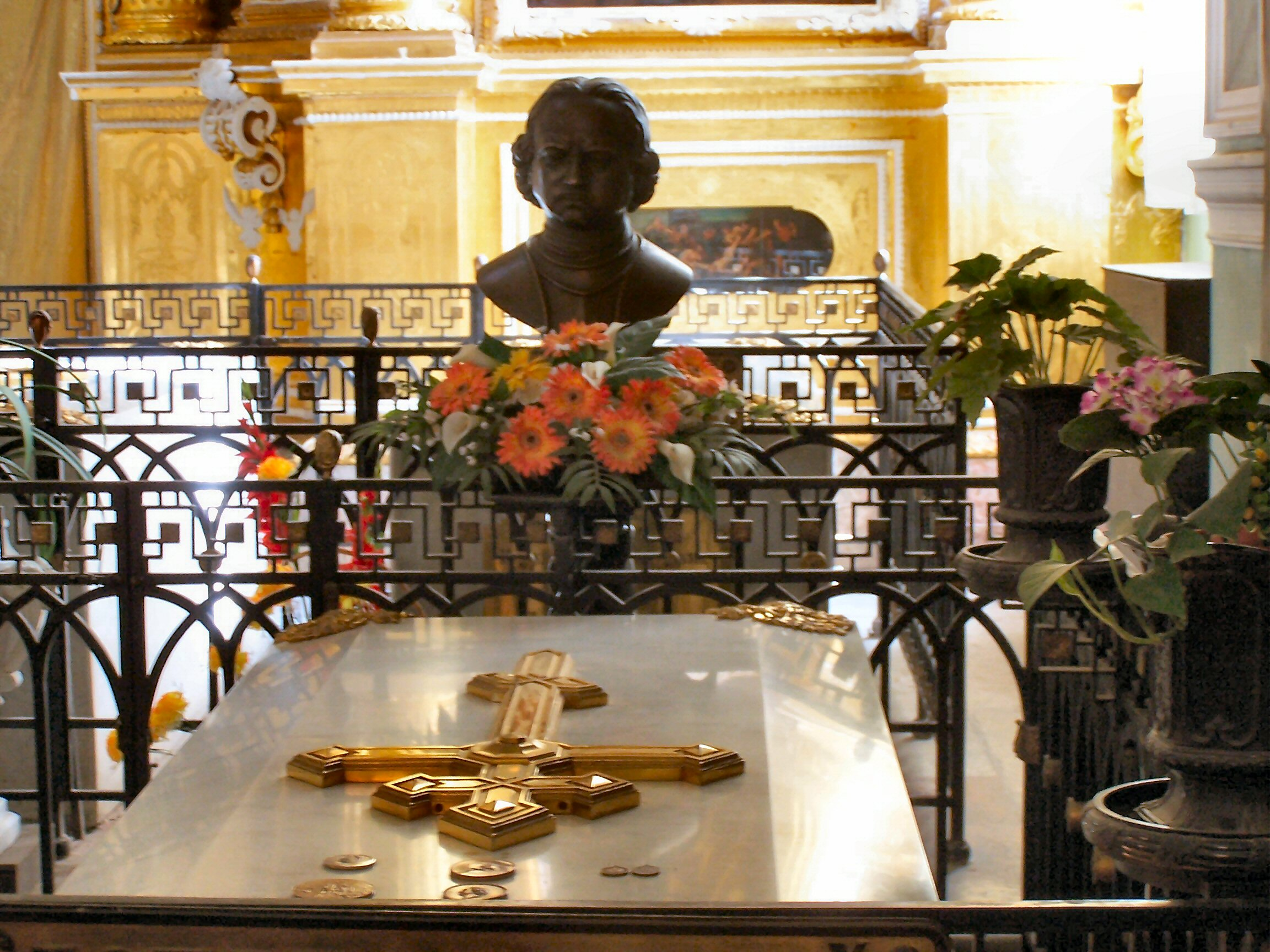
Tomb of Peter the Great in the Peter and Paul Fortress, St Petersburg

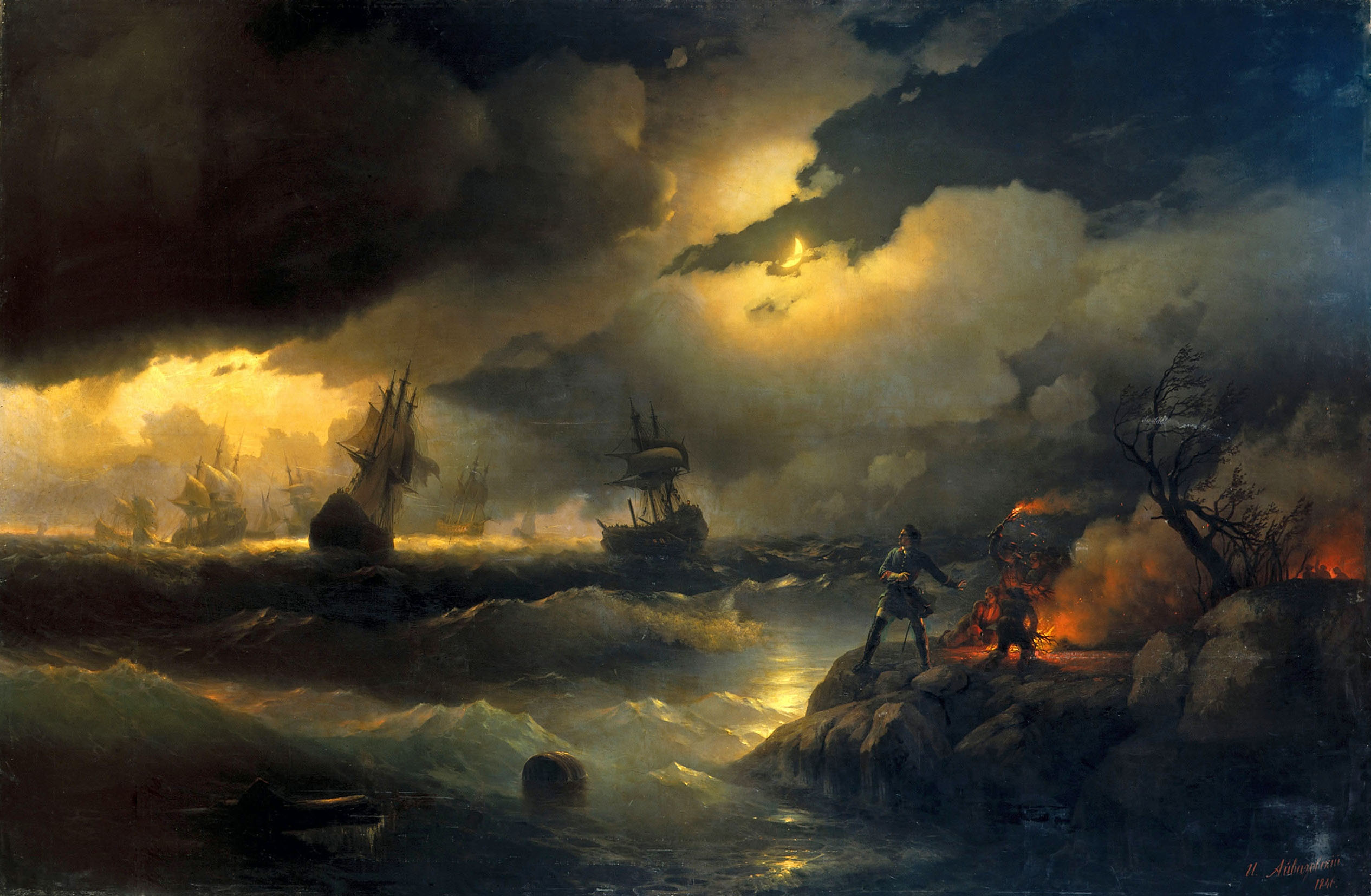
Peter I at Krasnaya Gorka Lighting a Fire on the Shore to Signal to his Sinking Ships; the Russian Baltic Fleet first went to sea in full force, – to help the Russian troops besieging Viborg, – the fleet got caught in a storm. Painting by Ivan Aivazovsky (1846).

Peter has been featured in many histories, novels, plays, films, monuments and paintings. They include the poems The Bronze Horseman and Poltava, and the unfinished novel The Moor of Peter the Great, all by Alexander Pushkin. The former dealt with The Bronze Horseman, an equestrian statue raised in Peter's honour. Aleksey Nikolayevich Tolstoy wrote a biographical historical novel about him, named Peter I, in the 1930s.

- The 1922 German silent film Peter the Great directed by Dimitri Buchowetzki and starring Emil Jannings as Peter
- In 1929 A. N. Tolstoy's play was true to the party line, depicting Peter as a tyrant who "suppressed everyone and everything as if he had been possessed by demons, sowed fear, and put both his son and his country on the rack."
- The 1937–1938 Soviet film Peter the Great
- The 1976 film How Czar Peter the Great Married Off His Moor, starring Aleksey Petrenko as Peter, and Vladimir Vysotsky as Abram Petrovich Gannibal, shows Peter's attempt to build the Baltic Fleet.
- Peter was played by Jan Niklas and Maximilian Schell in the 1986 NBC miniseries Peter the Great.
- The 2007 film The Sovereign's Servant depicts the unsavoury brutal side of Peter during the campaign.
- A character based on Peter plays a major role in The Age of Unreason, a series of four alternate history novels written by American science fiction and fantasy author Gregory Keyes.
- Peter is one of many supporting characters in Neal Stephenson's Baroque Cycle – mainly featuring in the third novel, The System of the World.
- Peter was portrayed on BBC Radio 4 by Isaac Rouse as a boy, Will Howard as a young adult and Elliot Cowan as an adult in the radio plays Peter the Great: The Gamblers and Peter the Great: The Queen of Spades, written by Mike Walker and which were the last two plays in the first series of Tsar. The plays were broadcast on 25 September and 2 October 2016.
- A verse in the "Engineers' Drinking Song" references Peter the Great:

There was a man named Peter the Great who was a Russian Tzar;
When remodeling his the castle put the throne behind the bar;
He lined the walls with vodka, rum, and 40 kinds of beers;
And advanced the Russian culture by 120 years!

- Peter was played by Jason Isaacs in the 2020 'antihistory' Hulu series The Great.
- Peter is featured as the leader of the Russian civilization in the computer game Sid Meier's Civilization VI.
- Peter was played by Ivan Kolesnikov in the 2022 Russian historical documentary film Peter I: The Last Tsar and the First Emperor.

== Ancestors ==
Ancestors of Peter the Great

16. Nikita Romanovich
8. Feodor Nikitich Romanov
17. Princess Eudoxia Alexandrovna Gorbataya-Shuyskaya
4. Michael I of Russia
18. Ivan Vasiljevich Shestov
9. Kseniya Shestova
2. Alexis of Russia
10. Lukyan Stepanovich Streshnyov
5. Eudoxia Streshneva
22. Konstantin Romanovich Volkonsky
11. Anna Konstantinovna Volkonskaya
1. Peter I of Russia
24. Ivan Ivanovich Naryshkin
12. Poluekt Ivanovich Naryshkin
6. Kirill Poluektovich Naryshkin
3. Natalya Naryshkina
14. Leonti Dmitrievich Leontiev
7. Anna Lvovna Leontieva
15. Praskovia Ivanovna Raevskaya

== See also ==
- Government reform of Peter the Great
- History of Russia (1721–96)
- History of the administrative division of Russia
- Military history of the Russian Empire § Peter the Great, on the modernization of the Russian military under Peter the Great
- Peter the Great Statue
- Censorship in the Russian Empire § Peter I's Reforms
- Russian battlecruiser Pyotr Velikiy, named after Peter the Great

== Sources ==
- Anisimov, Evgenii V. (2015). The Reforms of Peter the Great: Progress Through Violence in Russia. Translated by Alexander, J. T. Routledge. ISBN 9781317454885.
- Bain, R. Nisbet (1905). Peter the Great and his pupils. Cambridge UP. Archived from the original on 26 May 2007.
- Brechka, Frank T. (1982). "Peter the Great: The Books He Owned". The Journal of Library History. 17 (1): 1–15. JSTOR 25541234.
- Cracraft, James (2003). The Revolution of Peter the Great. Harvard UP – via Questia.
- Dmytryshyn, Basil (1974). Modernization of Russia Under Peter I and Catherine II. Wiley. ISBN 978-0-471-21635-3.
- Vodarsky, Yaroslav (1976). Население России в конце XVII и начале XVIII веков [The population of Russia in the late XVII and early XVIII centuries] (in Russian). Moscow: Наука.
- Gordon, Alexander (1755). The history of Peter the Great, Emperor of Russia. To which is prefixed, A short general history of the country, from the rise of that monarchy: and an account of the author's life. OCLC 09104286. OL 17030794M.
- Hughes, John R. (2007). "The seizures of Peter Alexeevich". Epilepsy & Behavior. 10 (1): 179–182. doi:10.1016/j.yebeh.2006.11.005. PMID 17174607. S2CID 25504057.
- Hughes, Lindsey (2004). "Catherine I of Russia, Consort to Peter the Great". In Campbell Orr, Clarissa (ed.). Queenship in Europe 1660–1815: The Role of the Consort. Cambridge UP. pp. 131–154. ISBN 978-0-5218-1422-5.
- Lee, Stephen J. (2013). Peter the Great. Routledge. ISBN 978-1-1364-5325-0.
- Massie, Robert K. (1980). Peter the Great: His Life and World. New York: Alfred A. Knopf. ISBN 978-0-3072-9145-5., a popular biography
- Montefiore, Simon Sebag (2016). The Romanovs: 1613–1918. Knopf Doubleday Publishing Group. ISBN 9780307266521.
- Oudard, Georges (1929). Peter the Great. Translated by Atkinson, Frederick. New York: Payson and Clarke. LCCN 29-027809. OL 7431283W.
- Pipes, Richard (1974). Russia under the old regime. ISBN 0684140411.
- Riasanovsky, Nicholas (2000). A History of Russia (6th ed.). Oxford, England: Oxford UP. ISBN 978-0-19-503361-8.
- Palmer, R.R.; Colton, Joel (1992). A History of the Modern World. McGraw-Hill. ISBN 9780075574170.

Historiography and memory

- Brown, Peter B. (2008). "Towards a Psychohistory of Peter the Great: Trauma, Modeling, and Coping in Peter's Personality". Russian History. 35 (1–2): 19–44. doi:10.1163/187633108X00157.
- Brown, Peter B. (2009). "Gazing Anew at Poltava: Perspectives from the Military Revolution Controversy, Comparative History, and Decision-Making Doctrines". Harvard Ukrainian Studies. 31 (1/4): 107–133. JSTOR 41756499.
- Cracraft, James (1986). "Kliuchevskii on Peter the Great". Canadian-American Slavic Studies. 20 (4): 367–381. doi:10.1163/221023986X00322.
- Daqiu, Zhu. "Cultural Memory and the Image of Peter the Great in Russian Literature". Russian Literature & Arts 2 (2014): 19+.
- Gasiorowska, Xenia (1979). The Image of Peter the Great in Russian Fiction. University of Wisconsin Press. ISBN 0299076903.
- Platt, Kevin M. F. (2011). Terror & Greatness: Ivan & Peter as Russian Myths. Cornell University Press. ISBN 9780801448133.
- Resis, Albert (1985). "Russophobia and the "Testament" of Peter the Great, 1812-1980". Slavic Review. 44 (4): 681–693. doi:10.2307/2498541. JSTOR 2498541.
- Riasanovsky, Nicholas Valentine (1985). The Image of Peter the Great in Russian History and Thought. Oxford University Press. ISBN 9780195074802.
- Waugh, Daniel Clarke (2001). "We Have Never Been Modern: Approaches to the Study of Russia". Jahrbücher für Geschichte Osteuropas. 49 (3): 321–345. JSTOR 41050779.
- Zitser, Ernest A. (Spring 2005). "Post-Soviet Peter: New Histories of the Late Muscovite and Early Imperial Russian Court". Kritika: Explorations in Russian and Eurasian History. 6 (2): 375–392. doi:10.1353/kri.2005.0032. S2CID 161390436.
- Zitser, Ernest A. (2016). "The Difference that Peter I Made". In Dixon, Simon (ed.). The Oxford Handbook of Modern Russian History. doi:10.1093/oxfordhb/9780199236701.013.008. ISBN 978-0-19-923670-1.

Regnal titles
Preceded by Feodor III	Tsar of all Russia; 1682–1721 with Ivan V	Himself as Emperor
New title	Emperor of Russia; 1721–1725	Succeeded by Catherine I
Preceded by Frederick	Duke of Estonia and Livonia; 1721–1725	Succeeded by Catherine I
