= 1717 in Russia =

Events from the year 1717 in Russia

== Incumbents ==
- Monarch – Peter I

== Events ==
- College of War
- Collegium of Accounting
- Collegium of Commerce
- Collegium of Foreign Affairs
- Collegium of Justice
- Collegium of Mining and Manufacturing
- Collegium of State Expenses
- Collegium of State Income
- Russo–Khivan War of 1717

== Births ==
- November 14 – Alexander Sumarokov, poet, play write (died 1777)

== Deaths ==
- (N/A) - Alexander Bekovich-Cherkassky, commander (born N/A)
