= Council at the Highest Court of the Russian Empire =

Council at the Highest Court
- Совет при высочайшем дворе

Agency overview
- Formed: November 28, 1768
- Preceding agency: Imperial Council
- Dissolved: April 7, 1801
- Superseding agency: Permanent Council

The Council at the Highest Court was the highest advisory institution in the Russian Empire that existed from 1768 to 1801.

== Activity history and significance ==
It was created on November 28, 1768 by Catherine the Great as an emergency body to discuss issues related to the conduct of the war with the Ottoman Empire. Initially, it was going irregularly, but after the publication of a special decree on January 28, 1769, discussions were happening 1–2 times a week.

After the conclusion of the Treaty of Küçük Kaynarca, the basis for the work of the council ceased, but it continued to act as an advisory institution not only on matters of military and foreign, but also domestic policy (among others, it heard questions about the reform of the local government system and class structure, measures to suppress Pugachev's Rebellion). Under Paul I, the council lost any meaning, and at the end of 1800 it stopped its meetings. It was abolished on April 7, 1801 by Alexander I.

It was a deliberative body that did not have established powers and carried out office work through the private office of the secretaries of the empress or emperor. All proposals developed by the council, if adopted, were drawn up in the form of decrees and manifestos of the sovereign.

== The initial composition of the council ==
When the council at the Highest Court was formed, it included:

- Prosecutor General of the Senate, Prince Alexander Vyazemsky (retired in 1792);
- Vice-Chancellor, Prince Alexander Golitsyn (retired in 1778);
- General-in-chief, Prince Alexander Golitsyn (died in 1783);
- Adjutant general, Count Grigory Orlov (died in 1783);
- Senior member of the Collegium of Foreign Affairs, Count Nikita Panin (died in 1783);
- General-in-chief, Count Petr Panin (due to illness, retired in 1775);
- Field marshal, president of the Imperial Academy of Sciences and Arts, Count Kirill Razumovski (retired in the early 1770s);
- General-in-chief, president of the College of War, Count Zakhar Chernyshyov (died in 1784).

== Subsequent introduction to the Council ==
In subsequent years, new members were introduced to the council.

In 1770, the General-in-chief, vice-president of the Admiralty Board, Count Ivan Chernyshyov (died in 1797) entered the council.

In 1770, First Admiral and General Intendant of the Fleet, Admiral Sir Charles Knowles, 1st Baronet, (returned to England in 1774, died 1777)

In 1771, the General-in-chief, Commander-in-Chief in the capital city of Moscow, Prince Mikhail Volkonsky (retired in 1780) entered the council.

In 1774, Adjutant general, Governor of Novorossiya Governorate, Grigory Potemkin (died in 1791), entered the council.

In 1775, the council included:

- Vice-Chancellor, Count Ivan Osterman (retired in 1797);
- General Field Marshal, Governor of the Sloboda Ukraine Governorate, Count Pyotr Rumyantsev (retired in 1789).

In 1786, a senior member of the Collegium of Foreign Affairs, Count Alexander Bezborodko (died in 1799) entered the council.

In 1787, the council included:

- General-in-chief, Commander-in-Chief in St. Petersburg and St. Petersburg Governorate, Count James Bruce (died in 1791);
- Count Alexander Vorontsov (retired in 1794);
- Major general, Cabinet Secretary Pyotr Zavadovsky;
- Lieutenant general, Count Valentin Musin-Pushkin;
- Adjutant general, educator of the Grand Dukes Alexander Pavlovich and Konstantin Pavlovich Nikolai Saltykov;
- Cabinet Secretary Stepan Strekalov;
- Saint Petersburg Governorate leader of the nobility, Count Andrey Shuvalov (died in 1789).

In 1792, the Senate Prosecutor General Alexander Samoylov entered the council.
