= Government reform of Peter the Great =

Reforms in Russia (1696–1725)

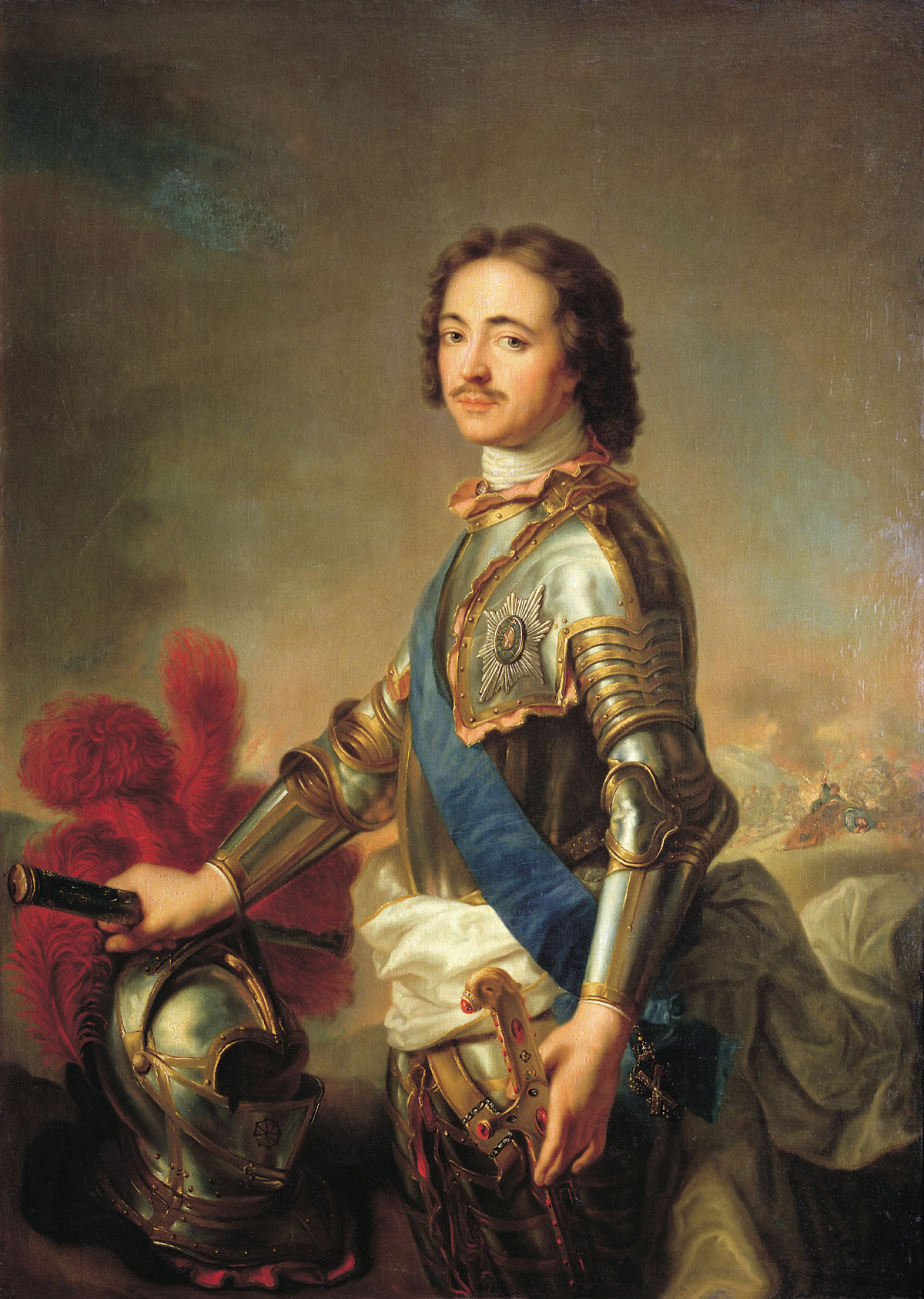
Peter the Great

The government reforms of Peter I aimed to modernize the Tsardom of Russia (later the Russian Empire) based on Western European models.

Peter ascended to the throne at the age of 10 in 1682; he ruled jointly with his half-brother Ivan V. After Ivan's death in 1696, Peter started his series of sweeping reforms. At first he intended these reforms to support the Great Northern War of 1700-1721; later, more systematic reforms significantly changed the internal structure and administration of the state.

== Background ==
During the Great Northern War (1700–1721), which dominated most of Peter's reign, Russia, along with a host of allies, seized control of the Baltic Sea from Sweden and gained considerable influence in Central and Eastern Europe. The war, one of history's costliest at the time, consumed significant financial and economic resources, and the administrative system Peter had inherited from his predecessors strained to gather and manage resources. During his Grand Embassy (Russian: Великое посольство, Velikoye posol′stvo), Peter conducted negotiations with a number of European powers to strengthen his position against Sweden and the Ottoman Empire, and his exposure to the more developed nations of Western Europe motivated him to take steps toward turning Russia into an industrial economy. Despite Russia's vast size and considerable natural resources, a number of factors, including corruption and inefficiency, hampered economic growth. Peter believed that targeted reform could not only strengthen his hold on power, but increase the efficiency of the government, and thus better the lot of his people.

Another major goal of Peter's reform was reducing the influence of the Boyars, Russia's elite nobility, who stressed Slavic supremacy and opposed European influence. While their influence had declined since the reign of Ivan the Terrible, the Boyar Duma, an advisory council to the tsar, still wielded considerable political power. Peter saw them as backward, standing in the way of Europeanization and reform. He specifically targeted the boyars with numerous taxes and obligatory services, including a tax on beards.

Like most of Russia's legal system at the time, Peter's reforms were codified and articulated in a series of royal decrees (Russian: указ, ukaz, literally "imposition"), issued chiefly between 1700 and 1721.

== Administrative reform ==
Prior to Peter's rule, Russia's administrative system was relatively antiquated compared to that in many Western European nations. The state was divided into uyezds, which mostly consisted of cities and their immediate surrounding areas; this system divided the population unevenly and was extremely clumsy to manage. In 1708, Peter abolished these old national subdivisions and established in their place eight governorates (guberniyas): Moscow, Ingermanland, Kiev, Smolensk, Archangelgorod, Kazan, Azov, and Siberian. Another decree in 1713 established Landrats (from the German word for "national council") in each of the governorates, staffed by between eight and twelve professional civil servants, who assisted a royally-appointed governor.

== Table of Ranks ==
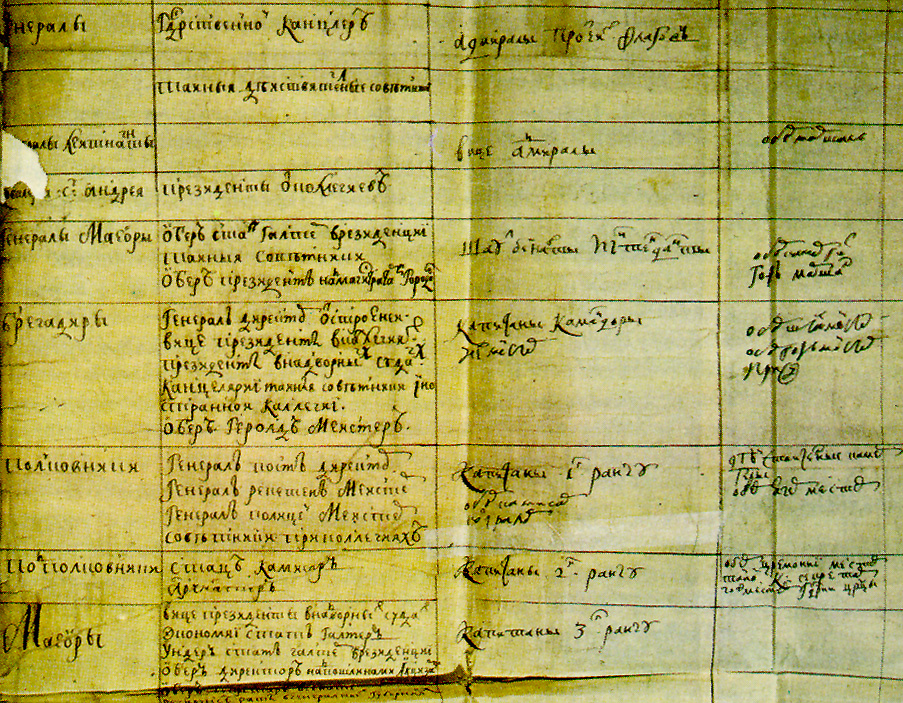
Table of Ranks

Peter's distrust of the elitist and anti-reformist Boyars culminated in 1722 with the creation of the Table of Ranks (Russian: Табель о рангах; Tabel' o rangakh), a formal list of ranks in the Russian military, government, and royal court. The Table of Ranks established a complex system of titles and honorifics, each classed with a number (I to XIV) denoting a specific level of service or loyalty to the Tsar. The origins of the Table of Ranks lie in Russia's military ranking system, which was also significantly modified and revised under Peter's rule.

The establishment of the Table of Ranks was among the most audacious of Peter's reforms, a direct blow to the power of the Boyars which changed Russian society significantly. Previously, high-ranking state positions were hereditary, but with the establishment of the Table of Ranks, anyone, including a commoner, could work their way up to the bureaucratic hierarchy with sufficient hard work and skill. A new generation of technocrats soon supplanted the old Boyar class and dominated the civil service in Russia. With minimal modifications, the Table of Ranks remained in effect until the Russian Revolution of 1917.

== Finance and trade ==
Fighting the Great Northern War required unprecedented economic resources, and Russia's yawning budget deficit and aging infrastructure meant that the state could not effectively allocate resources and money in wartime. Peter's government was constantly in dire need of money, and at first it responded by monopolizing certain strategic industries, such as salt, vodka, oak, and tar. Peter also taxed many Russian cultural customs (such as bathing, fishing, beekeeping, and wearing beards) and issued tax stamps for paper goods. However, with each new tax came new loopholes and new ways to avoid them, and so it became clear that tax reform was simply not enough.

The solution was a sweeping new poll tax, which replaced a household tax on cultivated land. Previously, peasants had skirted the tax by combining several households into one estate; now, however, each peasant was assessed individually for a tax of 70 kopeks, paid in cash. This was significantly heavier than the taxes it replaced, and it enabled the Russian state to expand its treasury almost sixfold between 1680 and 1724. Peter also pursued proto-protectionist trade policies, placing heavy tariffs on imports and trade to maintain a favorable environment for Russian-made goods.

=== Monetary reform ===
Peter also instituted a monetary reform that introduced copper coinage to Russia and reduced the amount of silver in a ruble from 40 grams (1.3 ozt) to 28 grams (0.90 ozt). This devalued ruble was equivalent to the contemporary thalers used in other European nations at the time. Five Moscow mints — four controlled by the Grand Treasury and one by the Naval Chancellery — produced the new coinage in the first decade of the 1700s. Fully in place by 1704, the reformed system expressed traditional Russian accounting values in actual coins: polushka (1/4 kopek), denga (1/2 kopek), altyn (3 kopeks), grivna (10 kopeks), poltina (50 kopeks) and ruble (100 kopeks). With the revaluation of the ruble, Russia saw the value of its currency cut in half when trading with other nations. For example, in 1707, British envoy Charles Whitworth noted that 110 kopeks was equivalent to 1 British crown (or 5 shillings) where previously 1 ruble was worth 10 shillings.

== Class structure ==
Peter's reign deepened the subjugation of serfs to the will of landowners. He firmly enforced class divisions, believing that "just as the landowner was to be tied to service, the townsman to his trade or handicraft, so the peasant was tied to the land." Peter endowed estate-owners to broad new rights, including a requirement that no serf leave his master's estate without written permission. Furthermore, Peter's new tax code significantly expanded the number of taxable workers, shifting an even heavier burden onto the shoulders of the working class.

A handful of Peter's slightly more progressive reforms imitated Enlightenment ideals; he did, for example, create a new class of serfs, known as state peasants, who had broader rights than ordinary serfs, but paid dues to the state. He also created state-sanctioned handicraft shops in large cities, inspired by similar shops he had observed in the Netherlands, to provide products for the army. Evidence even suggests that Peter's advisers recommended the abolition of serfdom and the creation of a form of "limited freedom" (a reality that did not come to pass until two centuries later). Nevertheless, the gap between slaves and serfs shrank considerably under Peter, and by the end of his reign the two were basically indistinguishable.

== Senate ==
On the 22 February 1711 a new state body was established by ukaz—The Governing Senate (Russian: Правительствующий сенат). All its members were appointed by Tsar Peter I from among his own associates and originally consisted of 10 people. All appointments and resignations of senators occurred by personal imperial decrees. The senate did not interrupt the activity and was the permanent operating state body.

The first members of the Senate were:

- Count Ivan Musin-Pushkin
- Boyar Tikhon Streshnev
- Prince Pyotr Golitsin
- Prince Mikhail Dolgorukov
- Grigori Plemyannikov
- Prince Grigory Ivanovich Volkonsky
- Mikhail Samarin
- Vasiliy Apukhtin
- Nazariy Milnitskiy
- Ober-secretary Anisim Shchukin

== Collegia ==
On 12 December 1717 Peter I established nine collegia or boards which replaced old Prikazs. Each collegium had a President and Vice-President, but some Vice-Presidents were never appointed.

The original nine were:

- Collegium of Foreign Affairs, which replaced Posolsky Prikaz.
  - President: Fyodor Golovin.
  - Vice-President: Baron Pyotr Shafirov.
- Collegium of State Income (Kamer-kollegiia), or Collegium of Tax Collection, or Revenue.
  - President: Prince Dmitry Golitsin.
  - Vice-President: Baron Karl Nirot.
- Collegium of Justice, or Collegium of civics.
  - President: Andrey Matveyev.
  - Vice-President: Hermann von Brevern.
- Collegium of Accounting (Revizion-kollegiia), or Revision or Audit Collegium.
  - President: Prince Vasily Dolgorukov.
  - Vice-President: was not appointed.
- Collegium of War
  - President: Prince Alexander Menshikov.
  - Vice-President: Adam Veyde.
- Collegium of the Navy or Amiralteyskiy Collegium.
  - President: Count Fyodor Apraksin.
  - Vice-President: Cornelius Cruys.
- Collegium of Commerce
  - President: Count Pyotr Tolstoy.
  - Vice-President: Shmidt.
- Collegium of State Expenses (Shtats-Kontor)
  - President: Count Ivan Musin-Pushkin.
  - Vice-President: was not appointed.
- Collegium of Mining and Manufacturing
  - President: Jacob Bruce.
  - Vice-President: was not appointed.

== Success of Peter's Reforms ==
Peter's reforms set him apart from the Tsars that preceded him. In Muscovite Russia, the state's functions were limited mostly to military defense, collection of taxes, and enforcement of class divisions. In contrast, legislation under Peter's rule covered every aspect of life in Russia with exhaustive detail, and they significantly affected the everyday lives of nearly every Russian citizen. The success of reform contributed greatly to Russia's success in the Great Northern War; the increase in revenue and productivity increased the strength of the Russian war machine. More importantly, however, Peter created a "well-ordered police state" that further legitimized and strengthened authoritarian rule in Russia. A testament to this lasting influence are the many public institutions in the Soviet Union and the Russian Federation, such as Moscow State University, which trace their origins back to Peter's rule.

== See also ==
- Church reform of Peter the Great
- Table of Ranks
- Collegium (ministry)
- Government reform of Alexander I

== Sources ==
- Bushkovitch, Paul (27 September 2001). Peter the Great: The Struggle for Power, 1671–1725. Cambridge, England: Cambridge University Press. pp. 377–378. ISBN 978-1-139-43075-3.
- Cracraft, James. The Revolution of Peter the Great. (Harvard University Press, 2003)
- Hughes, Lindsey. Russia in the Age of Peter the Great (Yale University Press, 1998)
- Raeff, Marc. Peter the Great Changes Russia, 2nd edition. Lexington: D.C. Heath and Company, 1972
- Raeff, Marc. Problems in European Civilization: Peter the Great, Reformer or Revolutionary? Boston: D.C. Heath and Company, 1963.
- Riasonovsky, Nicholas. A History of Russia, 8th edition. New York: Oxford University Press, 2011.
- Sumner, B.H. Peter the Great and the Ottoman Empire. Hamden: Archon Books, 1965
- Sumner, B.H. Peter the Great and the Emergence of Russia. London: English Universities Press, 1960
- Vernadsky, George. Political & Diplomatic History of Russia. Boston: Little, Brown, and Company, 1936.
