= Collegium of State Expenses =

The Collegium of State Expenses (Schtats-kontor, or of the Treasury; also College) was a Russian executive body (collegium), created in the government reform of 1717. It was de-established during the decentralising reforms of Catherine II of Russia. Its first President was Ivan Musin-Pushkin.

== History ==
In 1711, following the establishment of the highest governing body - the Senate, the formation of sectoral governing bodies began - the colleges, replaced the order (Prikaz) system. According to the Swedish model, three colleges were established in the management of the reformed public finances: the chamber-college was in charge of income, the stats-office-college was in charge of expenditures and the revision college– responsible for the checks. Previously, the control over the state funds expenditures have been executed by the Prikaz on audited cases.

In December 1717, the staffs of the collegium were approved, and the president and vice president were appointed. The first president of the college was the Count I.A. Musin-Pushkin. The General Regulations determined the structure and procedure of office work in the college, and the college was located in the St. Petersburg. The functions of the collegium were delegated from the Big Treasury Prikaz, approved in December 1718, included the allocation of certain amounts to the state institutions and to the officials through local cash registers (renters), administered by renters appointed by the provincial college.

In November 1723, the Shtats-chamber-college from an independent governing body was transformed into the Shtats-chamber: in 1723-1726 in the structure of the Senate, and in 1726-1730 as part of the Chambers-College. However, in July 1730, to the Shats-chamber was returned to the statute of an independent college.

In the course of the local government reform carried out by Catherine II, new central government bodies and provincial institutions were established in the public finance sector: treasuries in St. Petersburg and Moscow, as well as provincial treasury chambers and county treasuries. They also incorporated the tasks of the divisions of the Shtats- chamber –college, which was abolished in 1780.
