= Imperial Council of the Russian Empire =

- Императорский совет

Agency overview
- Formed: May 29, 1762
- Preceding agency: Conference at the Highest Court
- Dissolved: July 9, 1762
- Superseding agency: Council at the Highest Court

The Imperial Council was the highest state institution under Emperor Peter III. It was created by decree of May 29, 1762 in place of the abolished Conference at the Highest Court. The council had the right to issue decrees signed by the emperor, and, in part of the cases, to make decisions without his participation (signed by Council members on behalf of the sovereign). The council's focus was on the war with Denmark conceived by the emperor. During the palace coup on June 28, 1762, members of the Council Alexander Vilboa, Mikhail Volkonsky, Mikhail Vorontsov, Alexey Melgunov, and Nikita Trubetskoy supported Catherine the Great, but the empress who ascended the throne dissolved the Imperial Council, soon establishing its own advisory body – the Council at the Highest Court.

== Composition of the Imperial Council ==
The Council included:

- Georg Holstein-Gottorp (first member of the Imperial Council)
- Peter August Schleswig-Holstein-Sonderburg-Beck, President of the Collegium of Foreign Affairs
- Mikhail Vorontsov, President of the College of War
- Nikita Trubetskoy, secret secretary
- Dmitry Volkov, Director of the Cadet Corps
- Alexey Melgunov
- Burkhard von Münnich
- Alexander Vilboa
- Mikhail Volkonsky

== Project of Nikita Panin ==
In the first year of the reign of Catherine II, a project for the formation of the "Imperial Council" in Russia arose among the most influential people. On January 17, 1763, the Prussian envoy Solms reported the rumor that came to him that the empress decided to "elect five or six people who, with the titles of state secretaries, would manage the collegiums; they will gather in the empress's office, reporting to her each according to their industry and receiving orders from her".

Actually, on January 8, 1763, Catherine II signed the Manifesto on the establishment of the "Imperial Council", but it was not made public. According to the draft drafted by Nikita Panin, the number of members of the council should be in the range of six to eight; at the same time, the Senate was deprived of the right to legislate and was divided into departments.

The project of Panin of the permanent Imperial Council of high-ranking officials, Catherine II rejected, explaining: "By law, the established Council will rise in time to the value of co-ruler, bring the subject too close to the sovereign and may give rise to the desire to share power with him". As Sergey Solovyov pointed out in the History of Russia:

On December 28, Catherine signed the manifesto, and yet it was not promulgated, the Imperial Council was not established; in important cases, as we shall see, the council or conference of persons appointed by the empress was still convened. Catherine arrived and here with that timidity, indecision, attentiveness to all opinions... Catherine did not obey Panin, gathered opinions...

The draft manifesto was discovered by Nicholas I on November 26, 1826, in the office of his deceased brother, Alexander I, signed, but with a torn signature. The documents submitted by Panin on this issue were published in 1871 in the seventh volume of the Collection of the Imperial Russian Historical Society.

Later, from among the closest trustees, Catherine II created the advisory "Council at the Highest Court".

== Sources ==
- Nikolay Chechulin. The project of the Imperial Council in the first year of the reign of Catherine II
