= Collegium (ministry) =

Type of government department in Russian Empire

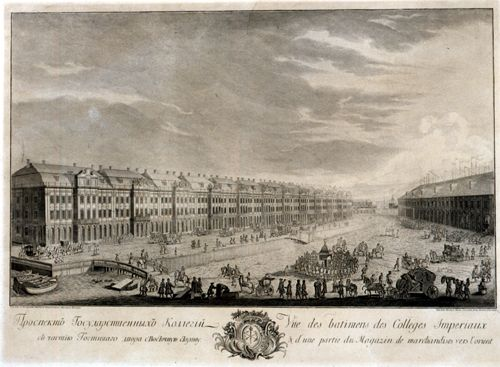
Building of the Twelve Collegia, 1753 engraving

The Collegium (Russian: Коллегии, lit. 'joined by law') was a type of government department in Imperial Russia. It was established in 1717 by Peter the Great to replace the system of Prikaz. They were housed in the Twelve Collegia building in Vasilyevsky Island, Saint Petersburg. In 1802, the Collegium was incorporated into and gradually replaced by the newly created system of Ministries.

== Origin ==
Following the formation of the Governing Senate in 1711, the Tsar Peter I sought to make more reforms on the imperial government bodies. He planned to replace the Prikaz with a new type of government agency, based on two new principles:

1. Systematic separation of departments, in order to avoid overlapping/omission of certain governmental duties under the Prikaz system;
2. Advisory procedure for resolving cases.

Similar form of central government institutions were adopted in Sweden and a number of German states. In 1717, Collegium was introduced based on the Swedish Kollegium.

== History ==
- 1717 - Establishment of the 8 following Collegiums: Collegium of Foreign Affairs, College of War, Collegium of State Income, Collegium of Justice, Collegium of Commerce, Collegium of State Expenses, Collegium of Mining and Manufacturing, and Collegium of Accounting.
- 1718 - Establishment of the Admiralty Board, as well as a special collegium to administer the newly acquired territories along the Baltic Sea.
- 1720 - Publication of the General Regulations (Russian: Генеральный регламент), which, among other things, made the following changes:
  - Formalized the 1718 special collegium into the Judicial Collegium of Livonian and Estonian Affairs (Russian: Юстиц-коллегия Лифляндских и Эстляндских дел)
  - Established the Chief Magistrate (Russian: Главный магистрат), which served as a court of appeal for all magistrates.
- 1721 - Establishment of the Collegium of Estates.
- 1722 - Division of Collegium of Mining and Manufacturing into the Collegium of Mining and the Collegium of Manufacturing.
- 1726 - Establishment of the Collegium of Economics (Russian: Коллегия экономии).
- 1763 - Establishment of the Collegium of Medicine (Russian: Медицинская коллегия).
- 1780s - As a result of the local government reform carried out by Catherine the Great, the number of collegiums was sharply reduced, and their functions were transferred to provincial institutions.
- 1802 - Passage of the Manifesto on the Establishment of Ministries by Alexander I of Russia, which incorporated the collegiums into newly created ministries.

== Regulations ==
The activities of the collegiums were determined by the General Regulations, which was approved by Peter I on February 28 (March 10 on Gregorian calendar), 1720.

The General Regulations instituted a set of office administration rules for the collegium. Each collegium was to be consisted of advisers and assessors, and headed by presidents and vice-presidents. The decisions of the collegium need to be debated on, received majority approval, and signed by all members present. Peter I paid special attention to this form of decision-making, noting that “every better arrangement happens through councils” (Chapter 2 of the General Regulations “On the advantage of colleges”).

== Internal structure ==
Each collegium consisted of the following staff:

- President: Head of a collegium, but could not make decisions without the consent of the other members. Appointed by the Governing Senate with consent from the Tsar.
- Vice President: Assistant of the president in performing duties of the collegium, and could stand in for the president during the latter's absence. Appointed by the Governing Senate.
- 4 counsellors
- 4 assessors
- 1 procurator
- 1 secretary
- 1 actuary
- 1 registrator
- 1 translator
- Clerks

Meeting were held daily, except for Sundays and public holidays. They started at 6 A.M. or 8 A.M. depending on the season, and usually lasted 5 hours.

Materials for the boards were prepared in the Office of the collegium, and were then transferred to the General Presence, where they were discussed and adopted by a majority of the votes. Issues on which the collegium failed to make a decision were referred to the Senate, the only institution to which the collegiums were subordinate to.

== See also ==
- Prikaz
- Government reform of Peter the Great
