= Conference at the Highest Court of the Russian Empire =

Highest state institution of the Russian Empire

Conference at the Highest Court
- Конференция при Высочайшем дворе Конференция министров

Agency overview
- Formed: 1756
- Preceding agency: Cabinet of Ministers
- Dissolved: 1762
- Superseding agency: Imperial Council
- Jurisdiction: Russian Empire

The Conference at the Highest Court (also known as Ministerial Conference) was the highest state institution of the Russian Empire. It was established in 1756 on the initiative of Chancellor Alexey Bestuzhev-Ryumin. It was abolished in 1762. Formally considered an advisory body, but in most cases acted independently on behalf of the empress. The conference used legislative power, gave instructions and orders to the Senate, the Synod, the colleges and other central institutions of the empire.

== Origin ==
As a permanent institution, it emerged along the lines of the Austrian Hofkriegsrat from the "Conference on Foreign Affairs" — non-periodically convened meetings that replaced the Cabinet of Ministers and gathered at the court according to the decree of Elizabeth Petrovna on December 23, 1741 to discuss the most important foreign policy issues. At a meeting of conference ministers on March 14, 1756, it was announced that the empress was instructed to hold such meetings regularly, on certain days and with a permanent composition of participants.

== Powers, working order and composition ==
The terms of reference and the terms of reference for the Conference were not clearly defined. Formally, the Conference was equal in its significance to the Senate and the Synod, but by decree of October 5, 1756, it received the right to send them "resolutions to execution" in the form of extracts from the protocols. The conference sent rescripts to the headquarters (on behalf of the empress) and received in response the reports (again addressed to Elizabeth Petrovna).

The objectives and the order of work of the Conference were set forth in the minutes of the organizational meeting of the conference ministers of March 14, 1756. It did not become a body of national importance and solved special tasks, mainly related to conducting a coherent domestic and foreign policy on the eve of and during the Seven Years' War.

The conference consisted of the "presence" of the conference ministers and the office. The "presence" of ex officio included the heads of the diplomatic, military and naval departments, the head of the Office of Secret Investigative Affairs and the Senate Prosecutor General. In addition to them, to the order of the Empress, the members of the "presence" were the most influential senators and (during the first year of the Conference) the heir to the throne, Grand Duke Pyotr Fyodorovich. The secretary of the Conference and the head of its office was Dmitry Volkov, who had a staff of 12 people (secretaries, recorders, translators, couriers).

== Activity ==
The scope of the Conference’s activities included general management of diplomatic relations through the Collegium of Foreign Affairs, development of draft treaties, conventions, declarations and other documents of an international character, general management of the Russian armed forces, control over the activities of commanders-in-chief, development of plans for military campaigns against Prussia, and management of the Königsberg Province occupied during the war.

It is through the Conference that the most significant projects of Count Peter Shuvalov are being carried out: Shuvalov's 12-pound licornes, formation of the Western Corps, monetary reform and the creation of the Copper Bank.

The conference dealt with many administrative and personnel issues, but its domestic policy activities were selective only to a limited extent limited to the prerogatives of the Senate.

The council met twice a week, on Mondays and Thursdays. In national historiography, a negative assessment of the Conference’s activities has been adopted. So, Anton Kersnovsky, the author of the well-known "History of the Russian Army", finds that the Conference was “under Russian conditions a worsened edition of the notorious "Hofkriegsrat":

The conference immediately fell entirely under Austrian influence and, commanding the army a thousand versts from St. Petersburg, was led, it seemed, first and foremost by respecting the interests of the Vienna Cabinet.

== Abolition ==
After the accession of Emperor Peter III on January 5, 1762, the Conference lost its independent significance and was abolished by imperial decree of February 8, 1762 in connection with the planned withdrawal of Russia from the Seven Years' War. The functions of the Conference were later transferred to the Council under Peter III (Imperial Council, later, under Catherine II, "Council at the Highest Court"), who inherited the office of the Office of the Conference and its office management system.

== Conference ministers ==
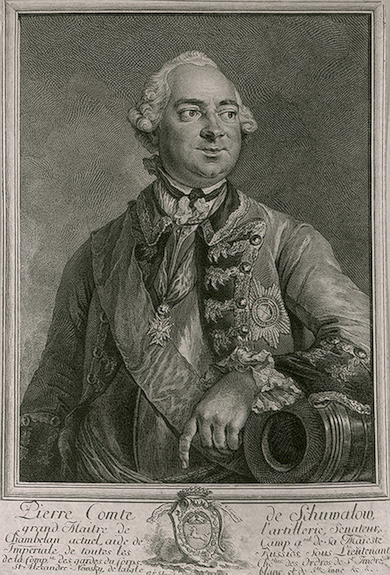
Count Peter Shuvalov, one of the most influential conference ministers

- Stepan Apraksin (March 14, 1756 — September 1, 1757)
- Alexey Bestuzhev-Ryumin (March 14, 1756 — February 14, 1758)
- Mikhail Bestuzhev-Ryumin (March 14, 1756 — September 11, 1757)
- Alexander Buturlin (March 14, 1756 — September 17, 1760)
- Mikhail Vorontsov (March 14, 1756 — January 21, 1762)
- Roman Vorontsov (December 28, 1761 — January 20, 1762)
- Mikhail Golitsyn (March 14, 1756 — December 17, 1757)
- Ivan Neplyuyev (August 16, 1760 — January 20, 1762)
- Nikita Trubetskoy (March 14, 1756 — January 20, 1762)
- Yakov Shakhovskoy (August 16, 1760 — December 25, 1761)
- Alexander Shuvalov (March 14, 1756 — January 20, 1762)
- Peter Shuvalov (March 14, 1756 — January 4, 1762)
- Grand Duke Pyotr Fyodorovich (March 14, 1756 — May 5, 1757)

== Sources ==
- Naumov, Victor (1986). Domestic policy issues in the minutes of the Conference at the Highest Court and the Imperial Council (1756–1762). Archaeographic Yearbook.
- Fursenko, Vasily (1913). Conferences and consultations in the reign of Empress Elizabeth Petrovna. Journal of the Ministry of Education.
- Collection of the Russian Historical Society. Minutes of the Conference at the Highest Court. 1912.
- Solovyov, Sergey. History of Russia since ancient times, volume 24.
- Kersnovsky, Anton (1992). History of the Russian army, volume 1. Voice.
