= Jacob Bruce =

Russian general (1669–1735)

- Count
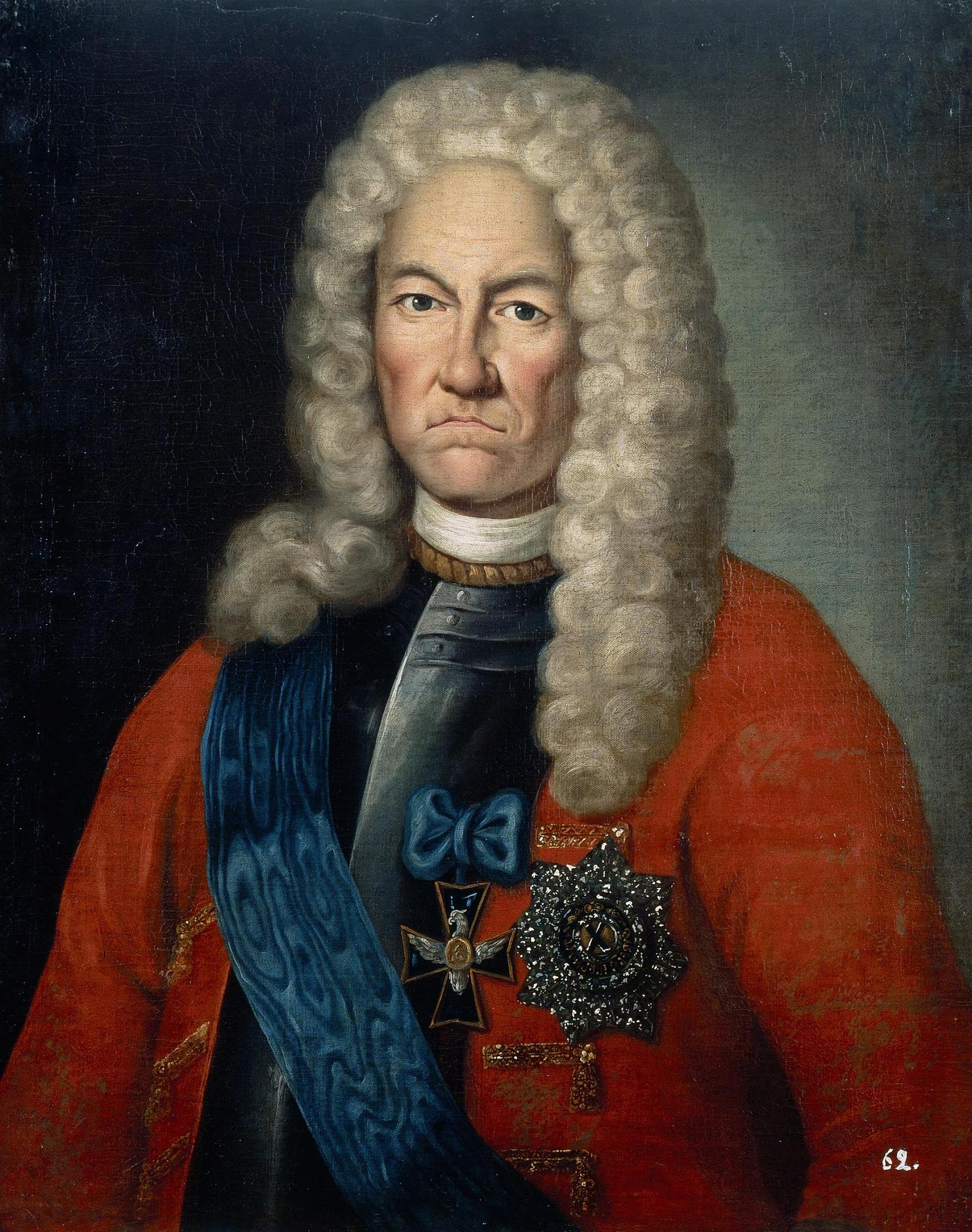
- Born: 11 May 1669; Moscow, Russia
- Died: 17 May 1735 (aged 66); Moscow, Russia
- Noble family: Clan Bruce

President of the Collegium of Mining and Manufacturing
- In office 1717–1722
- Monarch: Peter I
- Preceded by: Office established
- Succeeded by: Office disestablished

President of the Collegium of Mining
- In office 1722–1726
- Monarchs: Peter I Catherine I
- Preceded by: Office established
- Succeeded by: Alexey Zybin

Count James or Jacob Daniel Bruce (Russian: Я́ков Ви́лимович Брюс, romanized: Yakov Vilimovich Bryus; 11 May 1669 – 30 April 1735) was a Russian general, statesman, diplomat and scientist of Scottish descent (Clan Bruce), one of the chief associates of Peter the Great; Bruce was president of the Collegium of Mining and Manufacturing from 1717 to 1722, and president of the Collegium of Mining from 1722 to 1726. He was the younger brother of Robert Bruce, the first High Commandant of Saint Petersburg.

He participated in the Crimean (1687, 1689) and Azov campaigns (1695–1696) of Peter the Great against the Ottoman Empire during the Russo-Turkish War. During the Great Northern War Bruce was appointed major-general of artillery. He was involved in the revival of Russian artillery, which had been lost to the Swedish forces along with its commander, Prince Alexander of Imereti at Narva in 1700. He was commander of artillery in the Battle of Poltava (1709), for which he was made a knight of the Order of St Andrew. In 1721, he became one of the first Russian counts.

Bruce was one of the best educated people in Russia at the time, a naturalist and astronomer. In 1701 he founded the first Russian observatory; it was located in Moscow in the upper story of the Sukharev Tower. Bruce's scientific library of more than 1,500 volumes became a substantial part of the Russian Academy of Sciences library.

Among Muscovites, Bruce gained fame as an alchemist and magician, due in part to the innovative design of the Sukharev Tower, which was very unusual in 18th century Moscow. It was rumored that the greatest black magic grimoires of his collection had been bricked up into the walls of the Sukharev Tower.

== Memory ==
- Brusov Lane in Moscow
- Brusov Street in Saint Petersburg
- Brusov Gymnasium in Saint Petersburg

== Honours ==
- Poland–Lithuania: Order of the White Eagle

== Sources ==
- "Брюс, Яков Вилимович" . Brockhaus and Efron Encyclopedic Dictionary (in Russian). 1906.
