= Department of Revenue =

Department of Revenue can refer to agencies of various governments:

== India ==
- Department of Revenue (India), Ministry of Finance, Government of India
- Department of Revenue (Tamil Nadu)
- Department of Revenue and Disaster Management, Haryana
- Department of Revenue (Kerala)
- Department of Revenue and Agriculture and Commerce, Ministry of Agriculture

== Pakistan ==
- Department of Revenue (Pakistan)
- Department of Revenue- Government of Balochistan
- Department of Revenue- Government of Khyber Pakhtunkhwa
- Department of Revenue- Government of Punjab
  - Excise and taxation department, Punjab (Pakistan)
- Department of Revenue- Government of Sindh

== United States ==
- Internal Revenue Service
- Colorado Department of Revenue
- Georgia Department of Revenue
- Illinois Department of Revenue
- Kansas Department of Revenue
- Minnesota Department of Revenue
- Missouri Department of Revenue
- Oregon Department of Revenue
- Pennsylvania Department of Revenue
- South Carolina Department of Revenue
- Tennessee Department of Revenue
- Wisconsin Department of Revenue
- Wyoming Department of Revenue

== See also ==
- Board of Revenue (disambiguation)
- Ministry of Revenue (disambiguation)
