= Collegium of Accounting =

18th-century Russian executive body

The Collegium of Accounting (Revizion-kollegia, or of Revision or of Auditing; also College) was a Russian executive body (collegium), created in the government reform of 1717. It was de-established during the decentralising reforms of Catherine II of Russia. Its first President was Vasily Dolgorukov.

== History ==
In 1711, following the establishment of the highest governing body - the Senate, the formation of sectoral governing bodies began - the colleges, replaced the order (Prikaz) system. According to the Swedish model, three colleges were established in the management of the reformed public finances: the chamber-college was in charge of income, the stats-office-college was in charge of expenditures and the revision college – responsible for the checks. Previously, the control over the state funds expenditures have been executed by the Prikaz on audited cases.

In December 1717, the college organigram were approved, and the president and vice president were appointed. The first president of the college was Prince Y.F. Dolgoruky. The General Regulations determined the structure and procedure of the office work in the college, and the college was located in St. Petersburg. In December 1718, a decree was issued that defined the collegium functions (control over the expenditure of budgetary funds in the centre and in the regions), in 1719 it began its activity. The forerunner of the collegium was the Blijneaea (Nearest) Chancellery, which did not cope with the functions of financial control assigned to it. The work of the collegium was also unfortunate: due to the lack of a well-established accountability system at the institutions, the Revision college was unable to organize large-scale state control and in 1723, it was reorganized from an independent governing body into the Revision college of the Senate. However, in 1725 the status of an independent board was returned to it.

Under Peter II, the college was relocated to Moscow, but by the decree of the Empress Anna Ivanovna was returned to Petersburg; at the same time, the revision regulations were promulgated (the charter, a complete set of resolutions and rules defining the scope and operation of the collegium).

In the 1780s, in the course of the public administration reform carried out by Catherine II, the functions of financial control were redistributed among the new gubernias institutions (state chambers), county treasuries, and the office of the state treasurer, who was united with the post of prosecutor general. In the department of the state treasurer, the following units of the Senate were formed: an expedition on government revenues and an expedition on government outstanding payments, and an expedition on evidence of accounts. The latter passed the functions of the Revision college, abolished in 1788.
