= Ministry of Revenue =

Ministry of Revenue may refer to:

- Ministry of Revenue (imperial China)
- Ministry of Revenue (Maharashtra), India
- Ministry of Revenue (Ontario), Canada
- Ministry of Revenue (Quebec), now Revenu Québec, Canada

== See also ==
- Ministry of Finance (disambiguation)
- Department of Revenue (disambiguation)
- Board of Revenue (disambiguation)
- Treasury (disambiguation)
- Exchequer
- Ministry of Revenues and Duties, a former Ukrainian ministry
