= Ministry of Commerce of the Russian Empire =

The Ministry of Commerce was the central state institution of the Russian Empire, in charge of foreign and domestic trade.

It was created as part of the establishment of ministries, according to the manifesto of September 8, 1802. The former Collegium of Commerce was subordinated to the Minister of Commerce and was divided into 4 institutions: foreign trade, domestic trade, communication and customs affairs. Gavriil Gagarin was the Minister of Commerce in 1800–1801 (before the ministry was established), Nikolay Rumyantsev in 1801–1810.

In 1803, the Commerce Department was established. By decree of August 17, 1810, the Ministry of Commerce was disestablished and its competences were divided between the ministries: foreign trade and customs affairs were transferred to the ministry of finance, and domestic trade and communication affairs – to the ministry of internal affairs.

== See also ==
- Ministry of Trade and Industry of the Russian Empire
- Ministry of Industry and Trade of the Russian Federation

== Sources ==
- Ministry of Commerce (Brockhaus and Efron Encyclopedic Dictionary)
