= Kamer-Kollezhsky rampart =

Former rampart in the Russian Empire

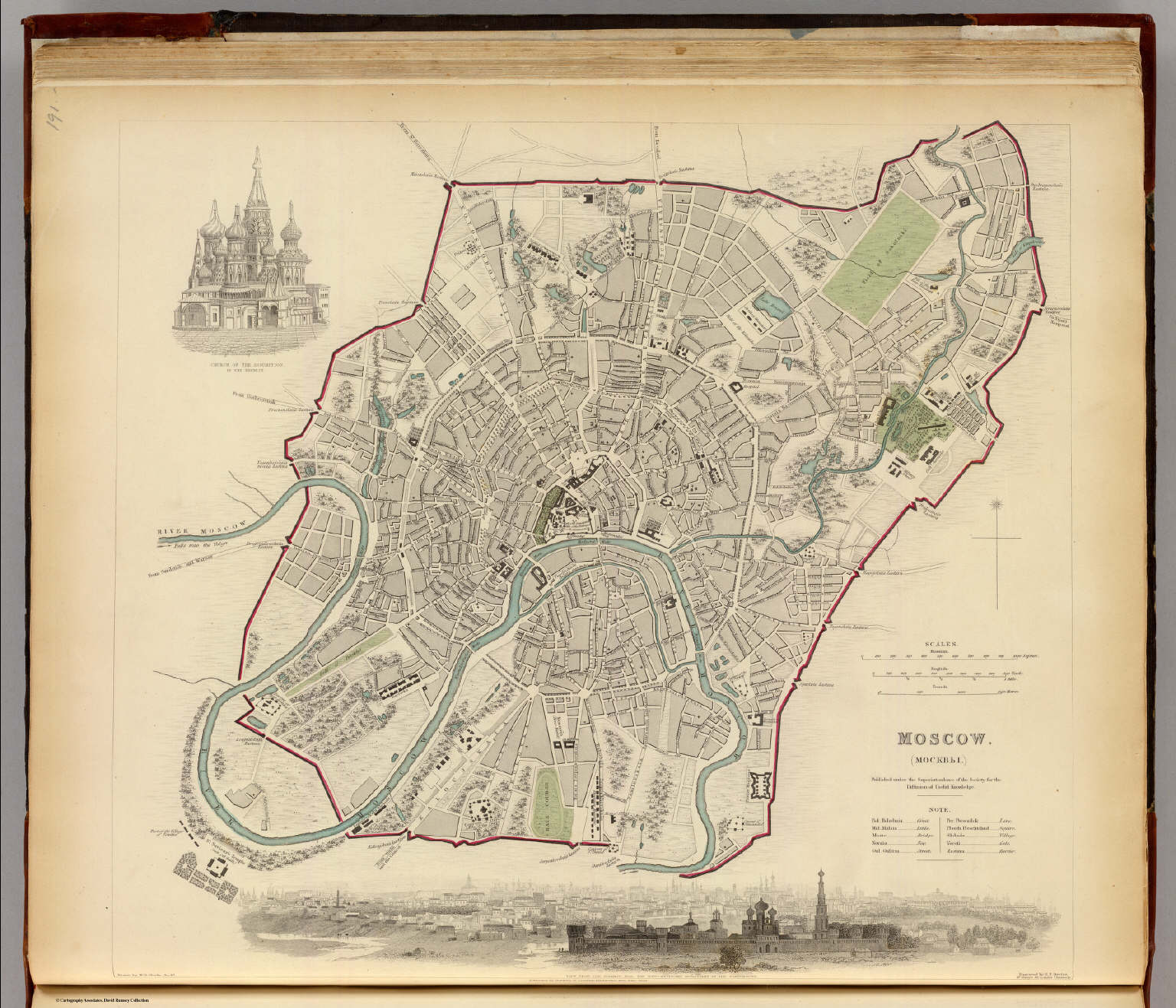
Map of Moscow in 1836. It is bordered by Kamer-Kollezhsky Val.

Kamer-Kollezhsky rampart (Russian: Камер-Коллежский вал, Kamer-Kollezhsky val, also translated as Kamer-Collegium barriers or Chamber-Collegium wall) was a rampart which was built by Kamer Collegium (Collegium of State Income of the Russian Empire) and became the last of the Moscow city walls. After demolishing of the ramparts and gates it became a ring of streets around the center of Moscow, Russia. It is the third historical ring of Moscow (after Boulevard Ring and Garden Ring), with a total length of 37 kilometers, partially integrated into the modern Third Ring circular highway. Kamer-Kollezhsky Val is not a road ring in the strict sense, as it has no crossings over the Moskva River.

The rampart was built in 1731-1742 by Kamer Collegium (tax authority, one of 12 colleges of Peter I), originally as an earth wall with 16 (later 18) guarded checkpoints (застава, zastava) for internal passport control and taxing of cargo. By 1806, it became Moscow's police border, by 1864 - the administrative border between the city, controlled by Moscow City Hall and country, controlled by Zemstvo.

Checkpoints were abandoned in 1852, and all fortifications gradually demolished. Names of streets and squares on the site of old rampart end in Russian words Val (Rampart) and Zastava (Checkpoint), i.e. Rogozhsky Val. Exceptions:

- Izmailovsky Val, a part of Kamer-Kollezhsky Val, emerged in 1930s after draining the ponds east of Yauza River
- Korovy Val and Zemlyanoy Val actually belong to Garden Ring, not Kamer-Kollezhsky Val

During the Communist rule, some of these streets were renamed after revolutionaries, however preserving the archaic elements Val and Zastava, which resulted in ridiculous names like Frunzensky Val (lit. Frunze's Rampart, the historical name Khamovnichesky Val was restored in 1986 even before Perestroika actually began) and Abel'manovskaya Zastava (lit. Abelman's Checkpoint, the name persist up to now). Such names have been a source of jokes.

Territories around the rampart developed in the second half of the 19th century as industrial, working-class neighborhoods.

The Third Ring, built in the 1990s, coincides with the rampart in its northern segment; in the north-eastern segment (Lefortovo), the rampart extends beyond Third Ring; elsewhere, the Third Ring extends beyond the rampart. Likewise, the boundary of Central Administrative District is distinct from both Kamer-Kollezhsky Val and Third Ring.
