= 1974 Canadian federal election =

- July 8, 1974

264 seats in the House of Commons 133 seats needed for a majority
- Opinion polls
- Turnout: 71.0% (▼5.7 pp)
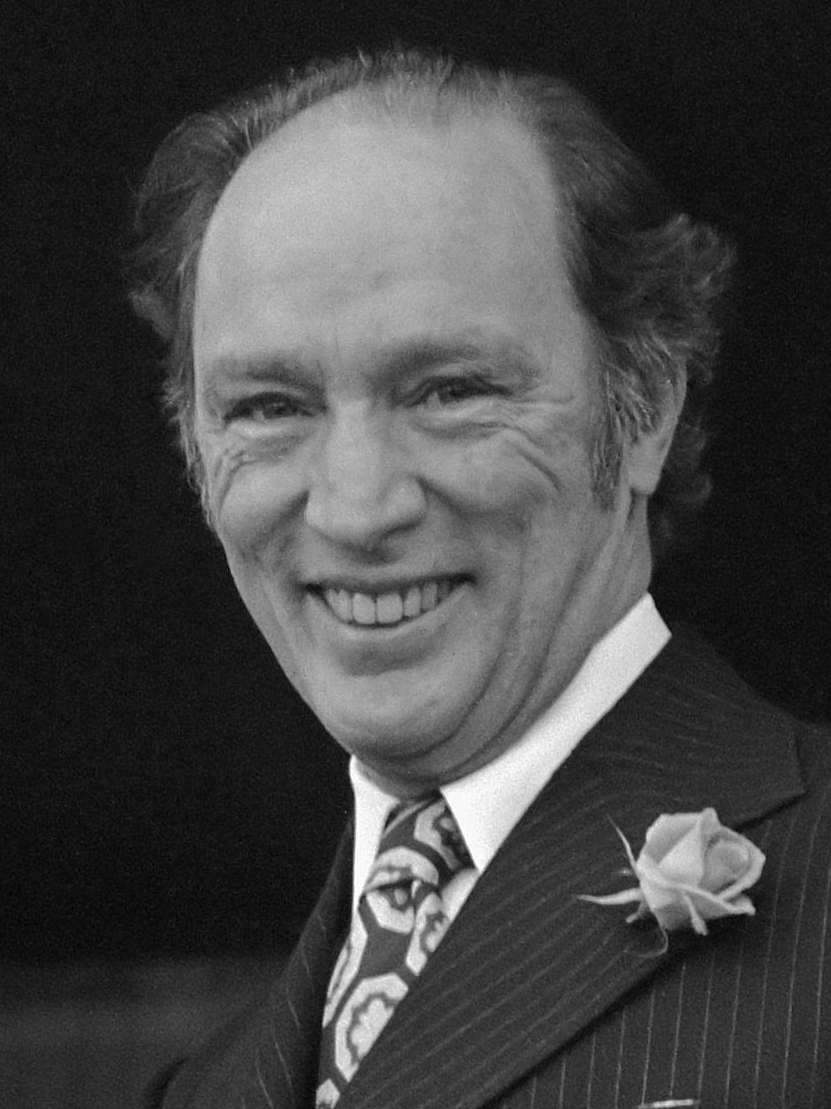

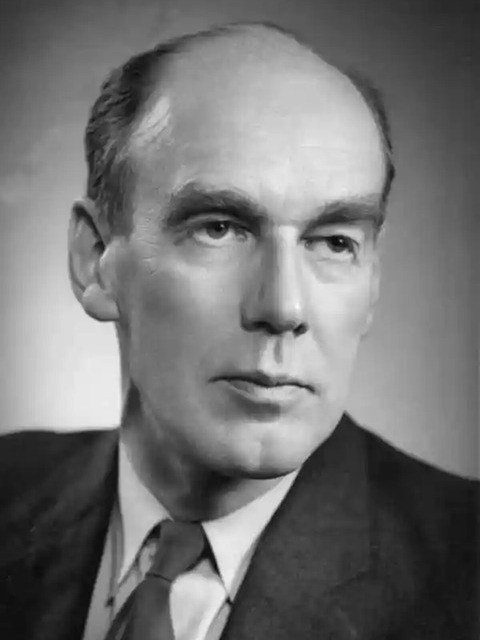

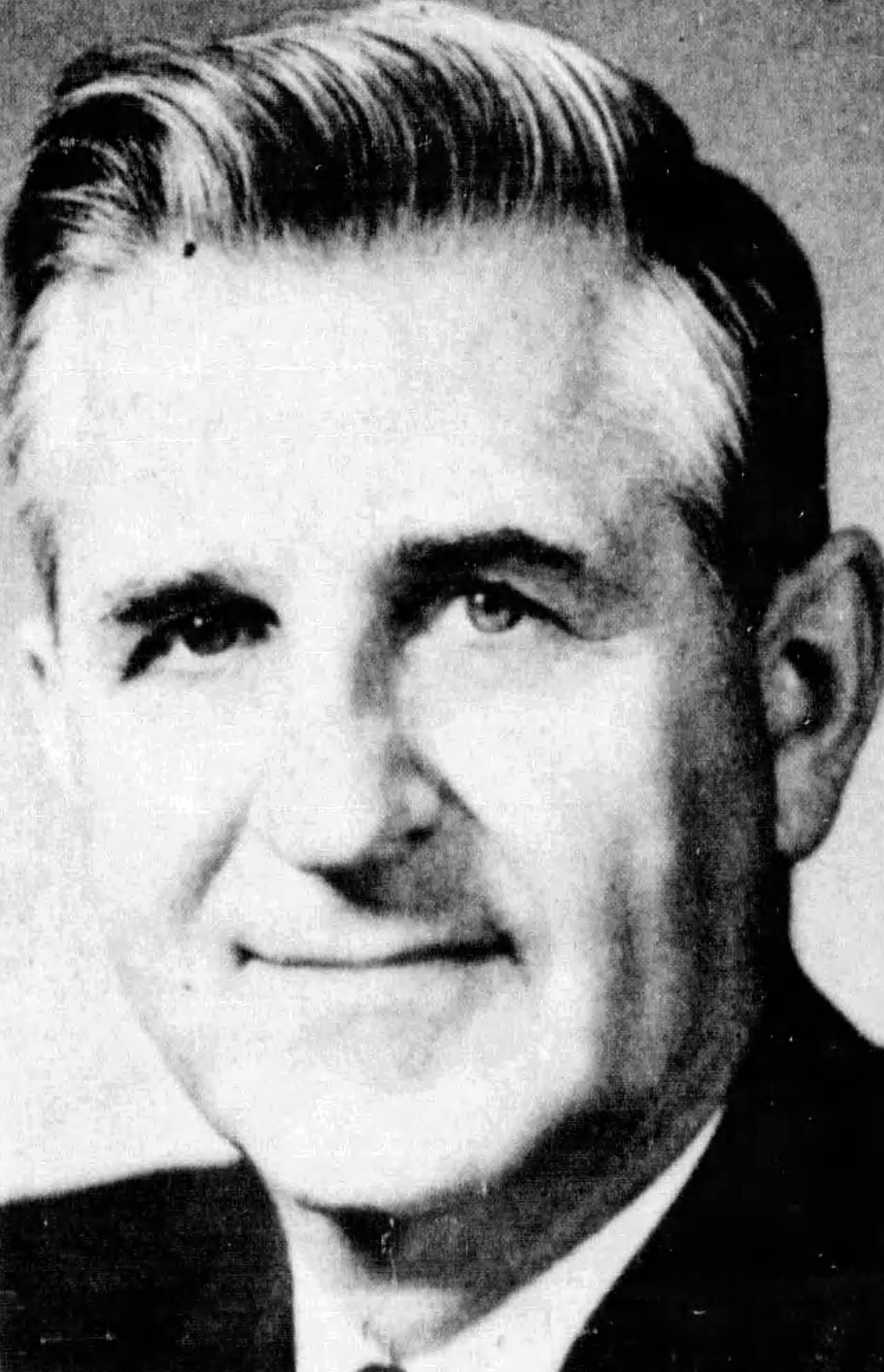

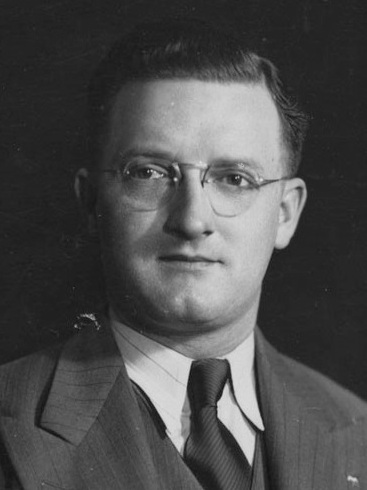
	First party	Second party
Leader	Pierre Trudeau	Robert Stanfield
Party	Liberal	Progressive Conservative
Leader since	April 6, 1968	September 9, 1967
Leader's seat	Mount Royal	Halifax
Last election	109 seats, 38.42%	107 seats, 35.02%
Seats before	109	106
Seats won	141	95
Seat change	▲32	▼11
Popular vote	4,102,853	3,371,319
Percentage	43.15%	35.46%
Swing	▲4.73 pp	▲0.44 pp
	Third party	Fourth party
Leader	David Lewis	Réal Caouette
Party	New Democratic	Social Credit
Leader since	April 24, 1971	October 9, 1971
Leader's seat	York South (lost re-election)	Témiscamingue
Last election	31 seats, 17.83%	15 seats, 7.55%
Seats before	31	15
Seats won	16	11
Seat change	▼15	▼4
Popular vote	1,467,748	481,231
Percentage	15.44%	5.06%
Swing	▼2.40 pp	▼2.49 pp
- Popular vote by province, with graphs indicating the number of seats won. As this is an FPTP election, seat totals are not determined by popular vote by province but instead via results by each riding.

- The Canadian parliament after the 1974 election
Prime Minister before election
Pierre Trudeau
Liberal
Prime Minister after election
Pierre Trudeau
Liberal

The 1974 Canadian federal election was held on July 8, 1974, to elect members of the House of Commons of Canada of the 30th Parliament of Canada. The governing Liberal Party was reelected, going from a minority to a majority government, and gave Prime Minister Pierre Trudeau his third term. The Progressive Conservatives, led by Robert Stanfield, did well in the Atlantic provinces, and in the West, but Liberal support in Ontario and Quebec ensured a majority Liberal government.

== Overview ==
The previous election had resulted in the Liberals emerging as the largest party, but far short of a majority, and only two seats ahead of the Progressive Conservatives. They were able to form a government with the support of the New Democratic Party, but the NDP withdrew their backing in May 1974 and voted with the Progressive Conservatives to bring down Trudeau's government in protest of a budget proposed by finance minister John Turner, which the opposition parties felt did not go far enough to control spiralling inflation.

The issue of inflation would become key in the election campaign. Stanfield had proposed a "90-day wage and price freeze" to break the momentum of inflation. Trudeau had ridiculed this policy as an intrusion on the rights of businesses and employees to set or negotiate their own prices and wages with the catch-phrase, "Zap! You're frozen!" In 1975, Trudeau introduced his own wage and price control system under the auspices of the Anti-Inflation Board.

While polls at the election campaign's outset had projected that the Progressive Conservatives would at least win a minority government, they in fact lost nearly a dozen seats. The Conservative campaign was also hurt by other factors, including Stanfield giving what was considered to be a poor interview immediately after the vote of no confidence in Trudeau's government, in which he could not name any potential Tory policies for the forthcoming election, and then by a bungled photo op later in the campaign when he attempted to play catch with some assembled journalists, only to fumble and drop the football.

The New Democratic Party, led by David Lewis, lost less than two-and-a-half percentage points in the popular vote, but lost almost half of their seats in the House of Commons. It was the worst result in the party's history up until that point, with only their performances in 1993, 2000 and 2025 to date being worse. They were hurt principally by the collapse of their vote in British Columbia; having won the popular vote and most seats in the province two years prior, the NDP were almost totally wiped out there during this election, losing all but two of their seats and finishing a distant third behind the Liberals and Tories. Their poor showing was blamed primarily on Lewis strongly hinting prior to the election that he would back Stanfield over Trudeau in the event of another minority parliament - which may have caused left-wing voters to vote for the Liberals in order to keep the Tories out of power - and also by an unpopular mineral tax introduced by the provincial British Columbia government of Dave Barrett, which would lead to Barrett's government suffering a landslide loss in the following year's provincial election.

The Social Credit Party of Canada, led by Réal Caouette, began to lose ground, and fell to 11 seats, one short of the number required to be recognized as a party in the House of Commons (and therefore qualify for research funds and parliamentary committee memberships). This status was nonetheless extended to the party by the governing Liberals, who believed that Social Credit's support came primarily at the expense of the Tories.

One seat was won in New Brunswick by independent candidate Leonard Jones. Jones, the former mayor of Moncton, had secured the Progressive Conservative nomination, but PC leader Stanfield refused to sign Jones' nomination papers because he was a vocal opponent of official bilingualism, which the PC Party supported. Jones had opposed providing services in French in the City of Moncton even though 30% of the city's population was francophone. Jones ran and won as an independent. After the election, Social Credit leader Caouette invited Jones to join the Socred caucus, which would have given that party enough members for official status. Caouette justified the invitation on the basis that Jones agreed with providing bilingual education at the primary school level. Jones declined Caouette's invitation, and sat as an independent.

Of the four major party leaders, only Trudeau would remain in place for the following federal election five years later. Stanfield, having failed to defeat the Liberals in any of his three elections as leader, faced pressure to stand down and eventually did so in 1976, being succeeded by Joe Clark. Lewis' position was rendered untenable by the loss of his own seat, and he was forced to stand down within a year of the election (though it later transpired that he had intended to retire in 1975 regardless of the election result, as he had secretly been battling leukaemia); Ed Broadbent initially replaced him as interim leader, and was subsequently elected to the position permanently. Caouette, who had only been able to play a minimal role in the election due to injuries sustained in a snowmobiling accident, stood down as leader of the Socreds in late 1976 and died not long afterwards; a succession of leaders took charge in the years ahead, ultimately leaving Fabien Roy as the man who would lead them into the next election.

== National results ==

Summary of the 1974 House of Commons of Canada election results
Party	Party Leader	Candidates	Seats				Popular vote		
Party	Party Leader	Candidates	1972	Dissol.	Elected	% Change	#	%	Change
Liberal	Pierre Trudeau	264	109	109	141	+29.4%	4,102,853	43.15%	+4.73pp
Progressive Conservative	Robert Stanfield	264	107	106	95	-11.2%	3,371,319	35.46%	+0.44pp
New Democratic	David Lewis	262	31	31	16	-48.4%	1,467,748	15.44%	-2.40pp
Social Credit	Real Caouette	152	15	15	11	-26.7%	481,231	5.06%	-2.49pp
Independent	—	63	1	-	1	-	38,745	0.41%	-0.18pp
Unknown		28	-	-	-	-	17,124	0.18%	-0.15pp
Marxist–Leninist	Hardial Bains	104			-		16,261	0.17%	
Communist	William Kashtan	69			-		12,100	0.13%	
No affiliation		3	1	1	-	-100%	551	0.01%	-0.24pp
Vacant				2					
Total		1,209	264	264	264	-	9,507,932	100%	
Sources: http://www.elections.ca History of Federal Ridings since 1867

Note: "% change" refers to change from previous election

== Vote and seat summaries ==
Ternary plots - shift of electoral support (1972-1974)
1972

1974
Electoral districts identified by colours of winning parties

Popular vote
Liberal	43.15%
PC	35.46%
NDP	15.44%
Social Credit	5.06%
Others	0.89%

Seat totals
Liberal	53.40%
PC	35.98%
NDP	6.06%
Social Credit	4.16%
Independent	0.37%

== Results by province ==
Party name		BC	AB	SK	MB	ON	QC	NB	NS	PE	NL	NT	YK	Total
Liberal	Seats:	8	-	3	2	55	60	6	2	1	4	-	-	141
Liberal	Popular Vote:	33.8	24.8	30.7	27.4	45.1	54.1	47.2	40.7	46.2	46.7	24.7	33.5	43.2
Progressive Conservative	Seats:	13	19	8	9	25	3	3	8	3	3	-	1	95
Progressive Conservative	Vote:	41.9	61.2	36.4	47.7	35.1	21.2	33.0	47.5	49.1	43.6	33.2	47.1	35.5
New Democratic Party	Seats:	2	-	2	2	8	-	-	1	-	-	1	-	16
New Democratic Party	Vote:	23.0	9.3	31.5	23.5	19.1	6.6	8.7	11.2	4.6	9.5	42.1	19.5	15.4
Social Credit	Seats:	-	-	-	-	-	11	-	-		-			11
Social Credit	Vote:	1.2	3.4	1.1	1.1	0.2	17.1	2.9	0.4		0.1			5.1
Independent	Seats:	-	-	-	-	-	-	1			-			1
Independent	Vote:	0.1	0.2	0.1	0.1	0.1	0.3	8.1			0.1			0.4
Total seats:		23	19	13	13	88	74	10	11	4	7	1	1	264
Parties that won no seats:
Unknown	Vote:	xx	1.0.		0.1	0.1	0.3			0.1				0.2
Marxist–Leninist	Vote:	0.1	0.1	0.1	0.1	0.1	0.4	xx	0.1					0.2
Communist	Vote:	0.3	0.1	0.1	0.1	0.1	0.1							0.1
No affiliation	Vote:					xx	xx							xx

xx - less than 0.05% of the popular vote.

=== Notes ===
- Number of parties: 6
  - First appearance: Marxist–Leninist Party of Canada
  - Final appearance: none

== See also ==
- List of Canadian federal general elections
- List of political parties in Canada
- 30th Canadian parliament
