= Peter Shafirov =

Russian statesman (1670–1739)

- Пётр Шафиров
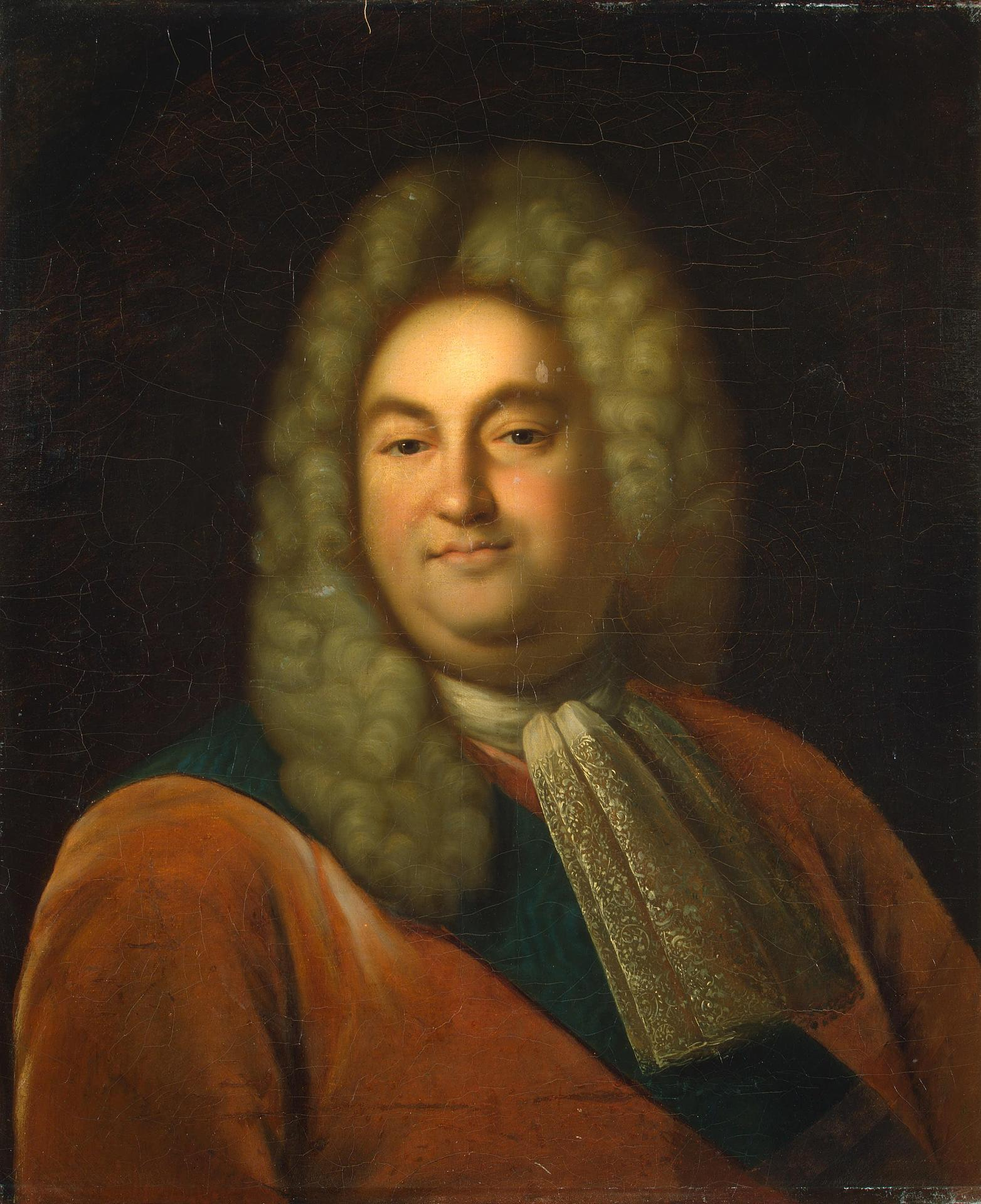
- Portrait of Shafirov

Head of the Posolsky prikaz
- In office 1706–1708
- Preceded by: Fyodor Golovin
- Succeeded by: Gavriil Golovkin

President of the Commerce Collegium
- In office 1725–1728
- Preceded by: Ivan Buturlin
- Succeeded by: Aleksandr Naryshkin
- In office 1733–1736
- Preceded by: Andrey Osterman
- Succeeded by: Stepan Velyaminov

Personal details
- Born: 1670 Smolensk, Russia
- Died: 1 March 1739 (aged 68–69) Saint Petersburg, Russia
- Awards: Order of St. Andrew; Order of the White Eagle

Baron Peter or Pyotr Pavlovich Shafirov (Russian: Пётр Павлович Шафиров; 1670 – 1 March 1739) was a Russian statesman and a prominent coadjutor of Peter the Great. He served as the head of the Posolsky prikaz (foreign ministry) from 1706 to 1708 and as the president of the Commerce Collegium from 1725 to 1728 and again from 1733 to 1736.

== Early life and career ==
Shafirov was born into a Polish Jewish family. His father, Pavel Shafirov, was a translator in the Russian department of foreign affairs, whose parents converted to the Russian Orthodox Church after Smolensk was ceded to Russia by Poland in 1654.

Peter Shafirov first made himself useful by his extraordinary knowledge of foreign languages. He began his service in the Posolsky prikaz (foreign ministry) in 1691. He was the chief translator in the foreign ministry for many years, subsequently accompanying Tsar Peter I on his travels. He was raised to the Russian nobility as a baron and received the rank of vice-chancellor. He was considered a diplomat of the highest order.

== Diplomatic missions ==
Shafirov concluded the Peace of the Pruth during the campaign of 1711. Peter left him in the hands of the Turks as a hostage, and on the breaking of the peace he was imprisoned in the Seven Towers. Finally, however, with the aid of the British and Dutch ambassadors, he defeated the diplomacy of Charles XII of Sweden and his agents, and confirmed the good relations between Russia and Turkey by the treaty of Adrianople (June 1713).

In 1718, Shafirov was appointed as a senator.

== Sentencing and death ==
In 1723, however, he was deprived of all his offices and sentenced to death. The capital sentence was commuted at the last minute to banishment, first to Siberia and then to Novgorod. Embezzlement and disorderly conduct in the senate were the offences charged against Shafirov. On the death of Peter, Shafirov was released from prison and commissioned to write the biography of his late master. However, the successful rivalry of his supplanter, Andrei Osterman, prevented Shafirov from holding any high office during the last fourteen years of his life.

== Works ==
In 1717, he authored a treatise entitled A discourse concerning the just causes of the war between Sweden and Russia, a historical tract on the war with Charles XII. Shafirov detailed some of the greatest exploits of the tsar-regenerator.

== Sources ==
- "Шафиров, Петр Павлович" . Brockhaus and Efron Encyclopedic Dictionary (in Russian). 1906.
