= Wyoming Department of Revenue =

Revenue service of the Wyoming state government

The Wyoming Department of Revenue is a state agency of Wyoming. It is located in the Herschler Building in Cheyenne, the state capital. Bret Fanning was appointed Director by Governor Mark Gordon on August 1, 2025. He succeeded Brenda Henson who served from 2021 until her retirement in early 2025.

According to their website, the agency is responsible for:

- administration and collection of mineral and excise taxes
- valuation of property
- the wholesale distribution of alcoholic beverages
- enforcement of liquor control laws

To oversee each of these functions the Department has multiple divisions, each with their own leadership. The five divisions are:Administrative Services, Excise Tax, Property Tax, Mineral Tax, and Liquor.

Wyoming does not impose an income tax. Local governments mostly rely on property tax with 60% of these revenues from mineral production.
