= Collegium of Commerce =

The Collegium of Commerce (also College, Russian: Коммерц-коллегия, from old German Kommerz - trade) is the central government agency created by Peter I to protect the trade.

== History ==
The commission for the establishment of the college was composed in Moscow of three Narva and one Derpt merchant, three Russian guests, three representatives of the living room, and six representatives of settlements. The commission revised the customs charter and offered such tax relief for Riga, Revel and Narva, which the Russian experts found unprofitable for the treasury. This, apparently, was the end of the activity of the Moscow "collegium on commerce".

With the resettlement of government offices to Saint Petersburg, in 1715, there was also the Collegium of Commerce, headed by P.M. Apraksin: in that and the next year the board has tried to arrange its office. By the decree of December 15 (26), 1717, the presidents and vice presidents of various colleges were appointed. The first president of the Collegium of Commerce became the privy councilor Pyotr Andreyevich Tolstoy, and Schmidt became the Vice President. But at the same time, the question of the structure of the Collegium of Commerce is moving on to a wider ground. According to the project of the hot mercantilist Johann Ludwig Luberas von Pott, the Commerce Collegium was to become the head of a network of Russian commercial agents in the main centers of world trade: these agents were obliged to inform the Collegium of Commerce of all the information needed for the Russian merchants. On the other hand, the Collegium of Commerce was to enter into close contact with the manufactory college and, together with it, regulate the direction of Russian industry, which constitutes the "life of trade". In this sense, Luberas compiled a draft instruction of the Collegium of Commerce, which was significantly changed compared to the Swedish instruction developed for the Collegium of Commerce in 1651, which served as a model for him. Based on the Swedish instruction and according to the Luberas draft, the Russian instruction of the Collegium of Commerce was approved (probably by Fick) on March 3 (14), 1719. During the general revision of college instructions, it was replaced by a new one (January 31 (February 11) 1724), but its general character remained the same.

With the closure, after Peter's ruling, the main magistrate, manufactories and berg colleges, their affairs were also joined to the department of the Collegium of Commerce (1731). At the same time, the internal structure of the Collegium of Commerce has also changed - it was divided into three expeditions: the first focused on commerce, the second on mining, and the third on factories and manufactories. In 1736, mining was transferred to the department of the newly established "General Berg-Director".

By decree of April 7 (18), 1742, the berg and manufactory colleges were restored; in 1743 the main magistrate was restored. Thus, in the department of the Collegium of Commerce again there were only cases related to commerce (that is, the 1st expedition).

With the arrangement of the provincial institutions of Empress Catherine II, the very existence of the Collegium of Commerce was questioned, since all its affairs were to be distributed between the state chambers and other public places of the provinces. By decree of September 16 (27), 1796, it was decided to abolish the Collegium of Commerce, but since in this way it would be necessary to fragment the supervision of such an important branch of the national economy as trade, the Collegium of Commerce was preserved on the previous basis, by the decree November 19 (30), 1796.

In 1800, in addition to the president and 10 government members, 13 members were elected to the Collegium of Commerce, for 3 year. The merchants and manufacturers were elected for this positions.

The notes of Gretsch contain a semi-fantastic story about the birth of this curious Pavlovian law:

Once, while the court was in Gatchina, the prosecutor general (P.X. Obolyaninov), returning from the emperor with a report, announced to Bezak that the sovereign ... would like to have some kind of civil case. "Let it be tomorrow!" - added Obolyaninov in a stern voice. Positive Bezak did not know what to do, he came to the office and reported his grief to Speransky. This one immediately found a way to help the trouble.

- Is there any library here? He asked one of the court servants.

- There is, sir, some pile of books in the attic, remaining even after His Excellency Prince Grigory Grigorievich Orlov.

- Lead me there, Speransky said, he found some old French books in the attic, and on the rest of the day and the next night he wrote "Commercial Charter of the Russian Empire". Obolyaninov read it to the emperor. Paul waved: "To be according to this" and awarded the entire office. Of course, that this charter was not put into effect was not even published. Only the commercial college organogram was attached to it and published (September 15, 1800). - Gretsch, 85-88

But almost in 1801 it was recognized that the presence of deputies in the Collegium of Commerce "was not only unsuccessful for the trade improving, but for the merchants themselves, so distracted from crafts and deals, and so influence it ruinously." With the establishment of the post of Minister of Commerce, the Collegium of Commerce was subordinated to him and divided into 4 expeditions: foreign trade, internal, communication and customs.

With the transformation of ministries in 1810, the post of Minister of Commerce was abolished, and the Collegium of Commerce was subordinated to the Minister of Finance. Foreign trade and customs affairs were transferred to the Ministry of Finance, and internal trade and communication affairs to the Ministry of Internal Affairs. In 1811, the temporary department of the Commerce College was established in the foreign trade department of the Ministry of Finance to complete unresolved court cases and seize accounts on the customs side. With the establishment of the judicial branch of the Foreign Trade Department, the temporary department of the Collegium of Commerce was closed by decree on December 27, 1823 (January 8, 1824), and at the same time, the existence of the Collegium of Commerce finally ceased.

== Counting Expedition ==
In the XVIII century, in addition to the listed expeditions, the Collegium of Commerce included a countable expedition and several commissions on commerce. The counting expedition was established temporarily ("before the state was approved") by decree on March 31 (April 11) 1732 and destroyed by decree on June 21 (July 2) 1743. It had the character of an audit institution and carried out the case, which was normally distributed among the office of the college and the audit college. The Commission on Commerce was established in 1727, "thanks to the merchants, seeing it in poor condition - for correction and consideration thereof". In 1760, the affairs of this commission were transferred to a new commission on commerce, which was established at the Senate to draw up a plan on how to "improve and bring in better condition" Russian commerce, external and internal. By decree on January 8, 1762, the second commission, in a reduced membership, was also transferred to the department of the Collegium of Commerce. By a decree of March 31, 1764, the meetings were established instead of them, "in order to keep up with things", a special duty of which was made the discussion of "all projects related to the spread of commerce, and the compilation of new regulations". In 1766, another special "commission to help the trade in Reval" was established at the Ministry of Commerce. In 1796, the existence of the commerce commission was recognized unnecessary and this commission was canceled.

== The presidents of the Collegium of Commerce ==
- 1716 — 1717 - Pyotr Matveyevich Apraksin
- 1718 — 1722 - Pyotr Andreyevich Tolstoy
- 1722 — 1725 - Ivan Fyodorovich Buturlin
- 1725 — 1726 - Peter Pavlovich Shafirov
- 1726 — 1731 - There was no president. The Chief Executive of the Collegium is the first member of the Commerce Commission Andrey Ivanovich Osterman, the vice president is Heinrich Claus von Fick
- 1731 — 1733 - Alexander Lvovich Naryshkin
- 1733 - Peter Pavlovich Shafirov (secondarily)
- 1733 — 1736 - Stepan Lukich Velyaminov
- 1736 — 1740 - Platon Ivanovich Musin-Pushkin
- 1740 — 1741 - Karl Ludwig von Mengden
- 1741 — 1750 - Boris Grigoryevich Yusupov
- 1750 — 1764 - Yakov Matveevich Evreinov (in 1750 - 1753 acting)
- 1764 — 1788 - Johann Ernst Minich
- 1788 — 1794 - Alexander Romanovich Vorontsov
- 1794 — 1796 - Gavriil Romanovich Derzhavin (acting)
- 1796 — 1799 - Peter Alexandrovich Soymonov
- 1799 — 1800 - Gavriil Petrovich Gagarin
- 1800 - Gavriil Romanovich Derzhavin (September to December, secondarily)
- 1800 — 1810 - Yurii Alexandrovich Golovkin (at this time, the post of president of the Collegium of Commerce was no longer in charge, the Minister of Commerce became the chief director of the Collegium, in 1800-1801 - Gavriil Petrovich Gagarin, in 1801-1810 - Nikolai Petrovich Rumyantsev)

== Bibliography ==
- Janet M. Hartley (2008). Russia, 1762-1825: military power, the state, and the people. ABC-CLIO. p. 127. ISBN 978-0-275-97871-6.
- John P. Ledonne (January 2001). "Russian governors general, 1775-1825". Cahiers du monde russe. 42: 5–30.
