= Gavriil Gagarin =

Russian politician and writer

Gavriil Petrovich Gagarin
- Гавриил Петрович Гагарин
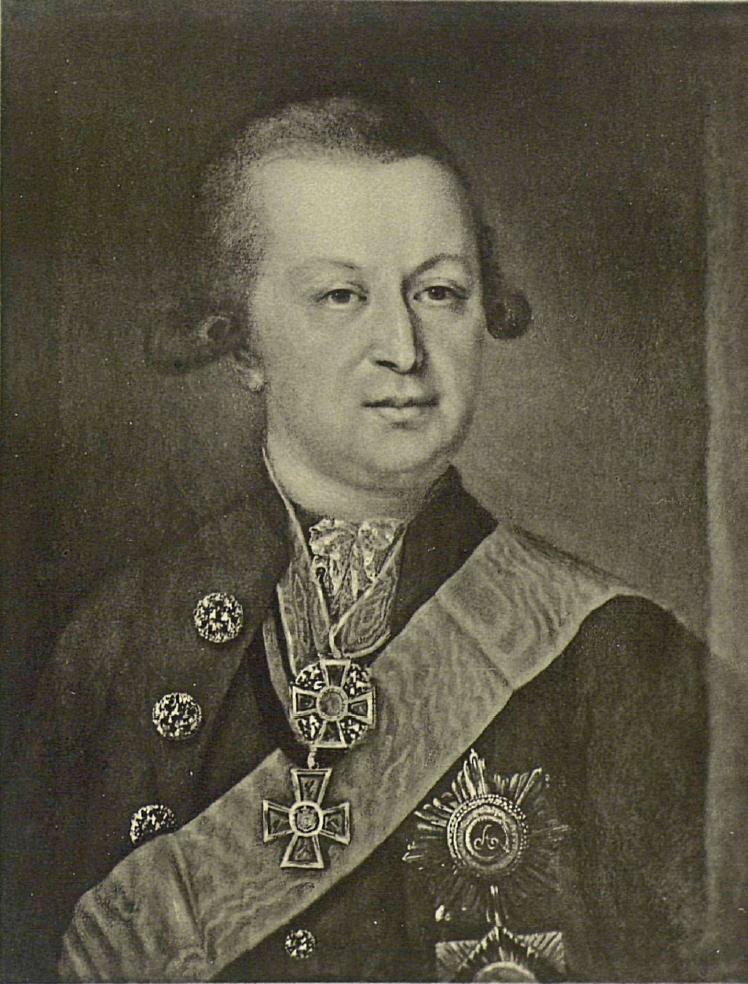

Personal details
- Born: January 20, 1745
- Died: January 31, 1808 (aged 63) Moscow Governorate, Russian Empire
- Resting place: Moscow Governorate
- Spouse: Praskovya Fedorovna Voeikova
- Children: Pavel Gavrilovich Gagarin
- Awards: Order of St. Andrew; Order of Saint Alexander Nevsky; Order of Saint Vladimir; Order of Saint Anna; Order of Saint John of Jerusalem

Prince Gavriil Petrovich Gagarin (January 20, 1745 – January 31, 1808 (1807), Bogoslovskoye village, Dmitrovsky Uyezd, Moscow Governorate) was a Russian writer, senator and minister of the Gagarin family. Active Privy Councillor (1800), under Paul I – member of the Imperial Council, under Alexander I – Minister of Commerce. One of the largest figures of the Masonic movement in Russia.

== Biography ==
Born in the family of Prince Peter Ivanovich Gagarin and Anna Mikhailovna (1715–1782), daughter of Kiev Governor-General Mikhail Leontiev. Mindful of her relationship to the Leontievs, Empress Elizabeth Petrovna took care of Gavriil from his youth.

In 1771–1772, under the name of Penzin, with his relative Alexander Kurakin and Nikolai Sheremetev, he made a Grand Tour of Europe (Leiden, Antwerp, Brussels, Calais, London, Paris) to supplement his education. In January 1773 he returned to Russia; half a year lived in St. Petersburg, since July 1773, as a volunteer, took part in the Russo-Turkish War. At the suggestion of Pyotr Rumyantsev, he was promoted to prime major. In 1774, he was granted the rank of Chamber Junker.

Successfully moved up the career ladder: on November 26, 1781, he was appointed chief procurator of the 6th Department of the Senate in Moscow; in 1783 he was granted the rank of chamberlain; on September 2, 1793, he was appointed as a senator. He led a very wide lifestyle; to multiply the income, he was involved in not the most clean financial operations. According to Fyodor Rostopchin, "this prince Gagarin was a business man, but a depraved snare, entangled in debt and lost all reputation".

He came close to the Grand Duke Pavel Petrovich thanks to his distant relatives, brothers Panin and Alexander Kurakin. He was a mediator in their correspondence. With the ascension to the throne of Paul I, the position of Gagarin was even more consolidated, in particular thanks to the friendship with Pyotr Lopukhin, the father of favorite of Pavel, Gagarin became a member of the imperial council. On April 5, 1797, he was awarded the Alexander Ribbon and all his debts were paid from the treasury in the amount of 300 thousand rubles. On January 2, 1799, he received the Order of St. John of Jerusalem. From 1799, Gagarin was the chief director of the State Loan Bank, then until the end of 1801 – President of the Collegium of Commerce. Since 1800 – Active Privy Councillor.

With the advent of Emperor Alexander I to the power on March 24, 1801, he retained his high position at court. Under him, Gagarin took part in the work of the Commission of Laws. He was involved in settling southern Siberia, a mulberry business in Russia (together with Peter Obolyaninov on February 22, 1800, he compiled a "Note on the distribution and improvement of mulberry production in the midday provinces of the Russian Empire"), the tariff of the Kyakhta customs and other issues. With the participation of Gagarin on March 1, 1801, a trade agreement was concluded with Sweden. He was a member of the Permanent Council, consisting of 12 members. He owned distilleries and was engaged in the supply of wine to the treasury.

He spent the last years of his life in his Bogoslovskoye village in Dmitrovsky Uyezd of Moscow Governorate, where he was buried in the local church.

== Freemasonry ==
Prince Gagarin was a prominent Masonic leader. In 1775–1777 he was an honored master in the Equality Lodge. Since 1779, after a trip to Sweden, he became the Grand Master of the "Great National Lodge of Russia" (the Swedish system), and in 1780 he became the great prefect of the chapter "Phoenix" in St. Petersburg. Moving to Moscow in November 1781, he opened the Provincial Lodge there; later headed the lodge "Sphinx". From 1782, he was also a member of the Masonic philanthropic organization "Friendly Scientific Society".

At the beginning of the 19th century, he resumed active Masonic activity in the Lodge "The Dying Sphinx", where he delivered speeches.

== Awards ==
- Order of Saint Anna of the 1st class (1786);
- Order of Saint Vladimir of the 2nd class (1786);
- Alexander Ribbon (1797);
- Order of St. Andrew (1800).

== Marriage and children ==
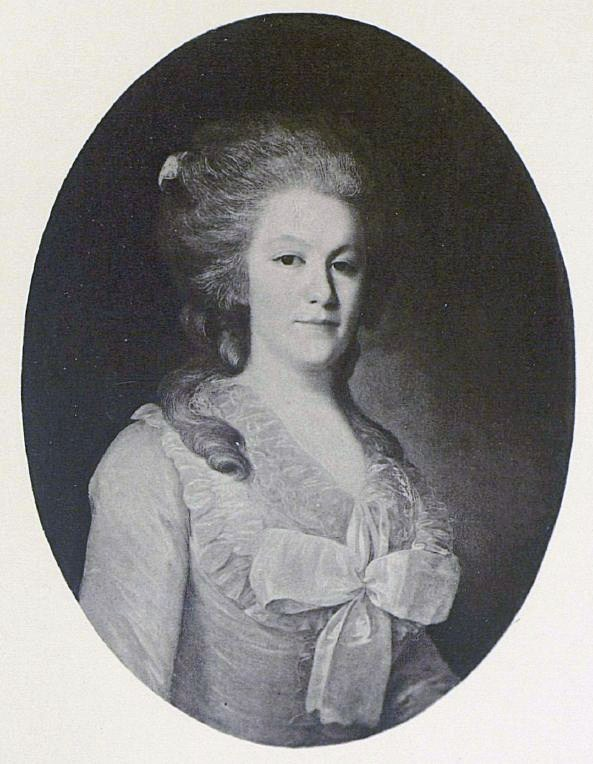
Portrait of Praskovya Fedorovna Gagarina by Fyodor Rokotov

In 1775, he entered into marriage with Praskovya Fedorovna Voeikova (October 25, 1757 – July 11, 1801), daughter of the Kiev Governor-General, General-in-chief Fedor Matveevich Voeikov and widow Anna Ivanovna Zherebtsova. A son and five daughters were born in marriage. Princess Praskovya Fedorovna died aged 44 in Serpukhov; She was buried under the Intercession Church in Novospassky Monastery, in Moscow.

- Pavel (1777–1850) – Major General, Director of the Inspection Department. The first marriage was to Anna Lopukhina;
- Maria (1778–1835) – spouse of the brigadier Alexander Vislenev;
- Elena (1780–1842) – not married;
- Varvara (1781–1808) – in 1802, she ran away from home with landowner Alexander Sigunov. Gagarin forgave daughter and allowed her to marry him;
- Anna (nun Joanna) (1782–1856) – since 1803 the wife of Pavel Vasilyevich Golovin (1770–1836). In his estate near Moscow, Dedenevo (Novospasskoye) founded a women's dormitory, on the basis of which in 1861 the Spaso-Vlakhernsky Convent was established;
- Catherine (1783–1861) was the wife of Nikita Sergeevich Dolgoruky (1768–1842).
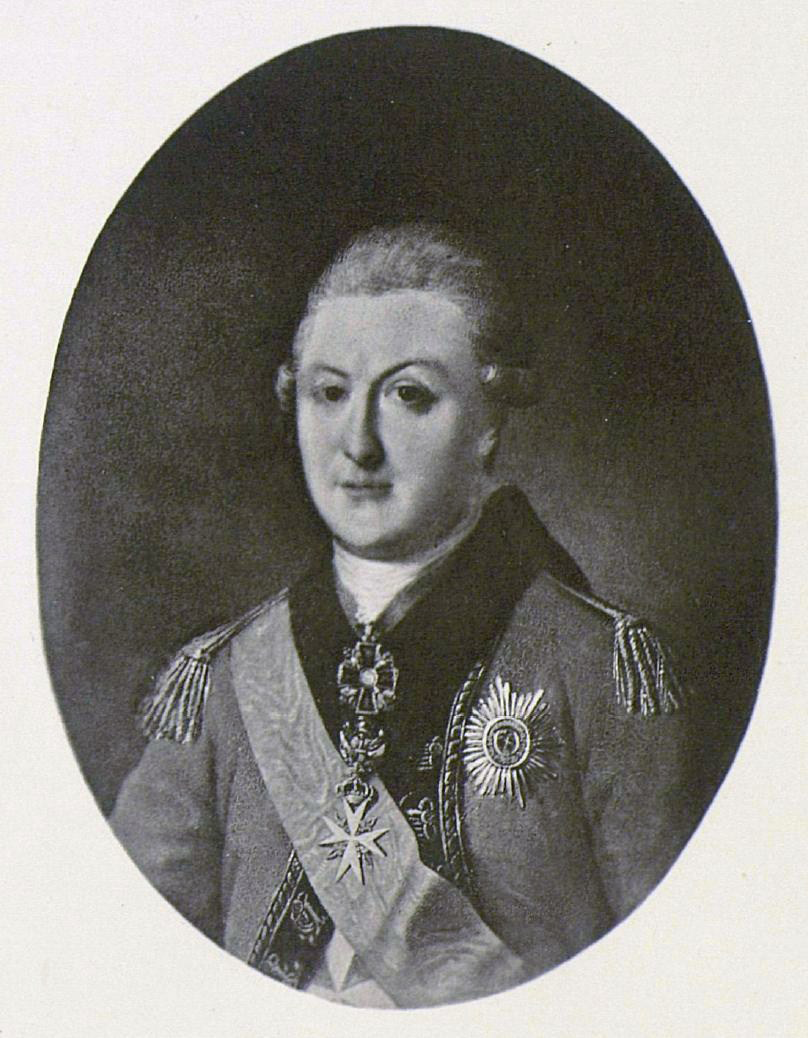
Portrait of Pavel

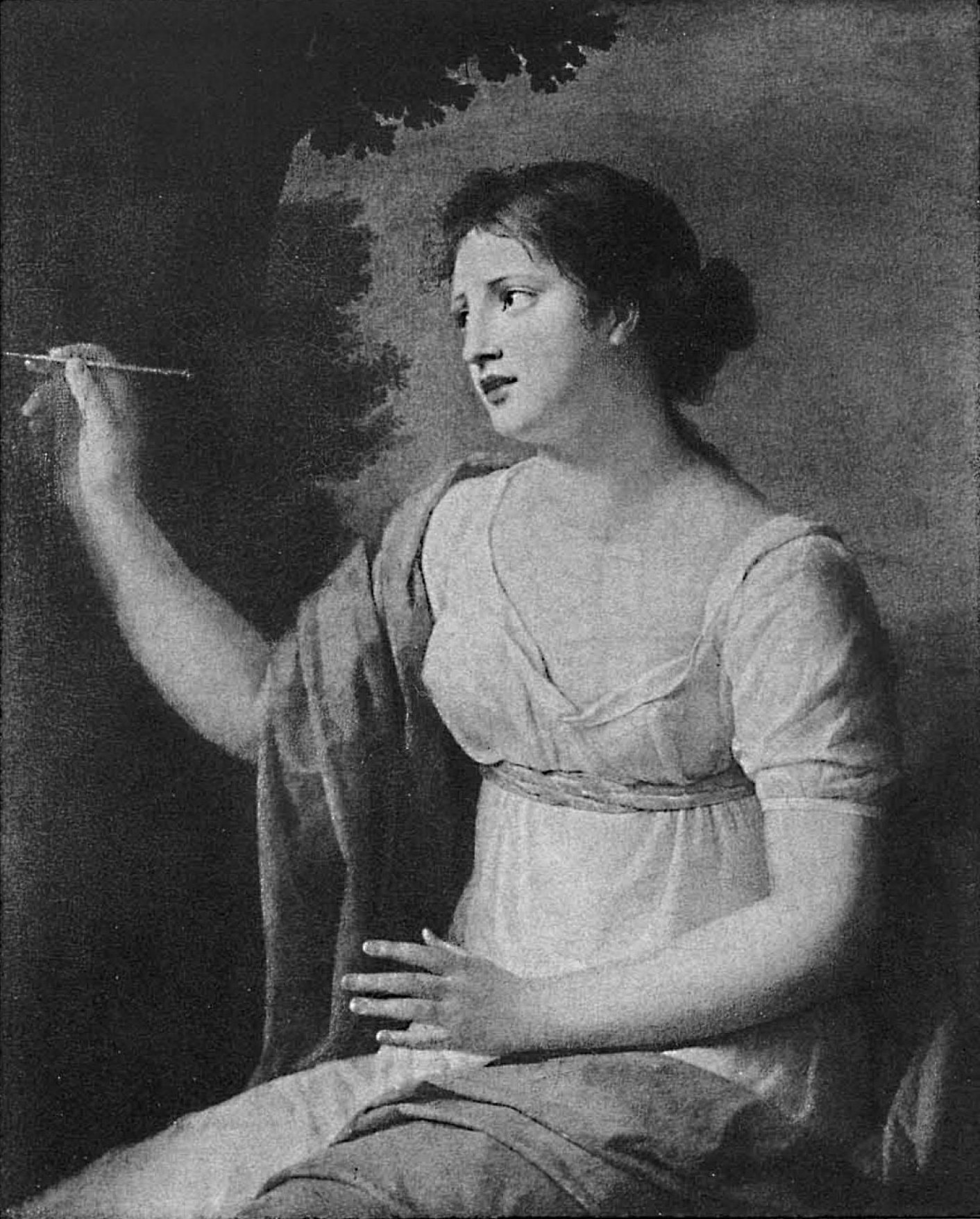
Portrait of Maria by Alexander Molinari

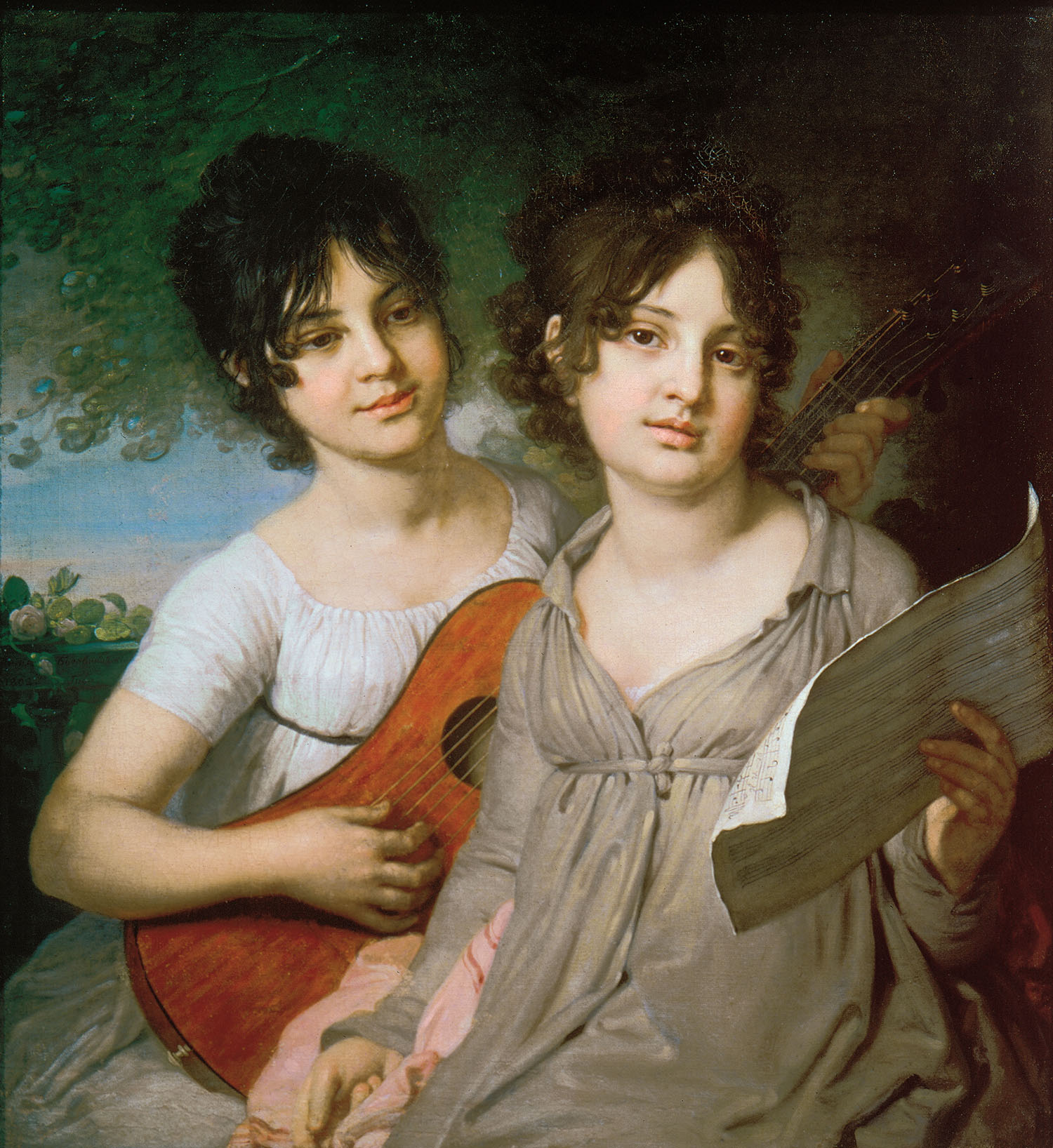
Portrait of Anna and Varvara by Vladimir Borovikovsky

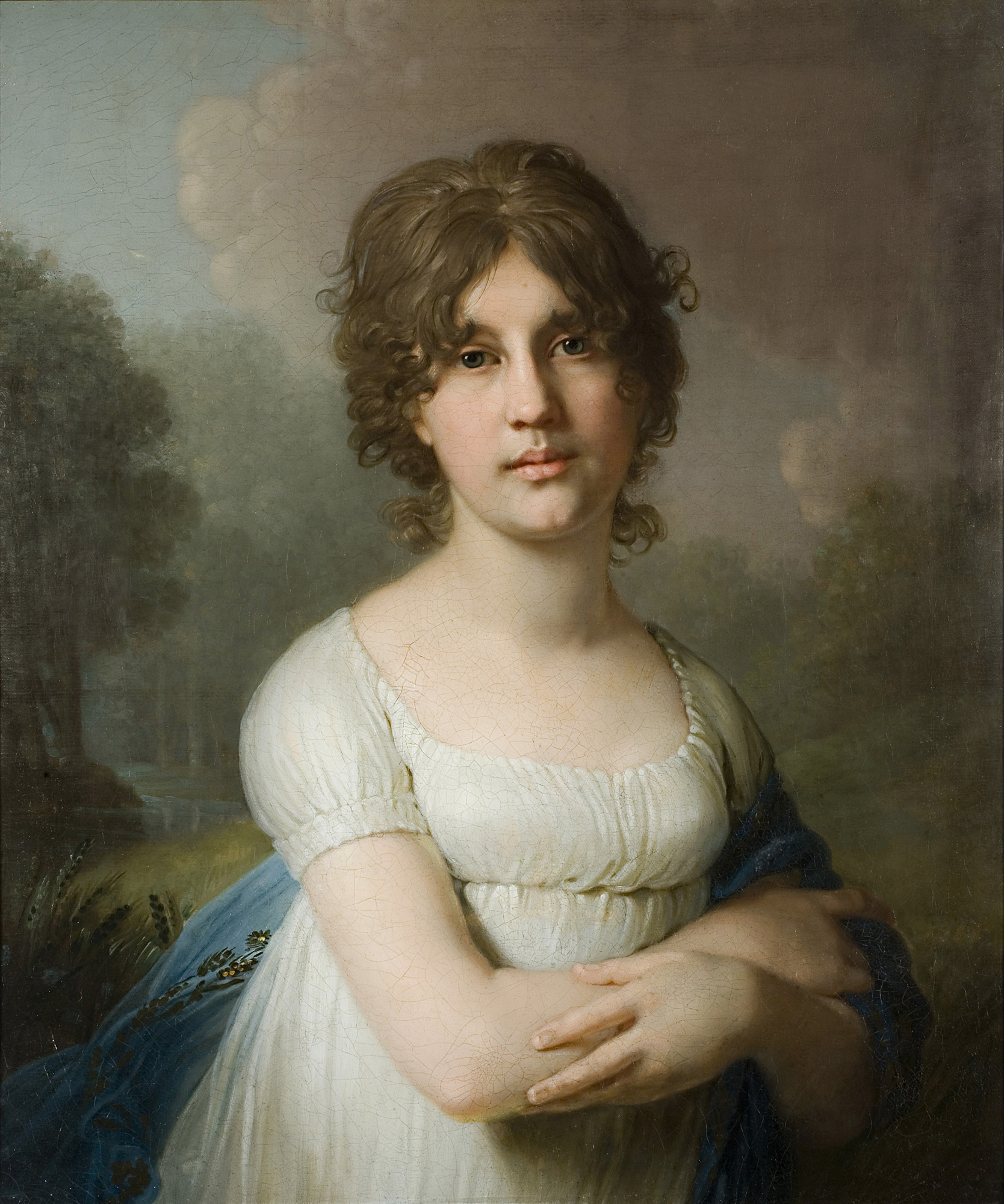
Portrait of Catherine by Vladimir Borovikovsky

== Writings ==
He was fond of literary activities, was also close in correspondence with the famous Metropolitan of Moscow Platon, who greatly appreciated his piety and endorsed his literary works. Archbishop Theophylact (Lopatinsky) dedicated his essay to Gagarin, written back in 1787, "The Mirror of the Hottest Spirit to the Lord God". Gagarin often met with a distant relative of his wife, hegumen of Korniliev Monastery, Juvenal (Voeikov).

In 1798 his books of theological and philosophical content were printed at the Synodal Printing House:

- "Akathist to the apostle and evangelist John" (Moscow, 1798);
- "Akathist with service and the life of St. Dimitry of Rostov" (Moscow, 1798);
- "Service to the Venerable Theodosius of Totemsky with life and miracles" (Moscow, 1798 and 1806).

Vasily Plavilshchikov in Mural of Russian Books (St. Petersburg, 1820) indicated Gavriil Gagarin as the author of Erotic Poems, published by his son Paul in 1811. In 1813 his autobiographical notes appeared: "The fun of my solitude in the village of Bogoslovsky" (St. Petersburg, 1813).

== Sources ==
- Gavriil Petrovich Gagarin (Russian Biographical Dictionary)
- Gavriil Petrovich Gagarin (Brockhaus and Efron Encyclopedic Dictionary)
- Monarchs of Russia (Evgeny Pchelov)
- Serkov, Andrey (2001). Russian Freemasonry. 1731–2000. Encyclopedic Dictionary. ROSSPEN.
