= Board of Revenue =

Board of Revenue or Revenue Board may refer to

- Board of Revenue of imperial China between the Tang dynasty and the Qing
- National Board of Revenue, Internal Resources Division, Ministry of Finance (Bangladesh)
- Federal Board of Revenue, Pakistan

India

- Central Board of Revenue Act, 1963; establishing under the Department of Revenue, Ministry of Finance (India):
  - Central Board of Direct Taxes
  - Central Board of Indirect Taxes and Customs (formerly Central Board of Excise and Customs)
- Andhra Pradesh Revenue Tribunal
- Gujarat Revenue Tribunal
- Maharashtra Revenue Tribunal
- Financial Commissioners of Haryana, Himachal Pradesh, Punjab, & Jammu and Kashmir
- Tamil Nadu Board of Revenue, abolished 1980 and replaced by the Tamil Nadu Department of Revenue
- Bengal Board of Revenue (defunct)
- Madras Board of Revenue (defunct)

== See also ==
- Ministry of Revenue (disambiguation)
- Department of Revenue (disambiguation)
