= Collegium of Estates =

Russian executive body

The Collegium of Estates (Russian: Вотчинная коллегия; also College) was a Russian executive body (collegium), created in 1721. In 1782, it was announced that the College would be closing, but due to various disputes, the process of closing took another four years.
