= Opinion polling for the 1974 Canadian federal election =

This article is about polls leading up to the 1974 Canadian federal election.

== During the 29th Parliament of Canada ==
Evolution of voting intentions at national level
Polling firm	Last day of survey	Source	LPC	PC	NDP	Other	ME	Sample
Election 1974	July 8, 1974		43.15	35.46	15.44	5.95		
Gallup	July 2, 1974		42	35	17	6	—	1,367
Gallup	June 15, 1974		42	34	18	6	—	1,099
Gallup	May 8, 1974		40	33	21	—	4.0	1,002
Gallup	March 1974		39	35	18	—	—	—
Gallup	January 8, 1974		42	31	21	6	—	1,037
Gallup	November 1973		43	33	18	6	—	1,044
Gallup	September 1973		35	35	20	10	—	—
Gallup	July 1973		41	30	19	10	—	—
Gallup	May 1973		42	34	16	8	—	—
Gallup	March 1973		40	30	20	10	—	—
Gallup	January 1973		39	36	16	9	—	—
Election 1972	October 30, 1972		38.42	35.02	17.83	8.63		
