= Ivan Chernyshyov =

Russian Field Marshal and General Admiral

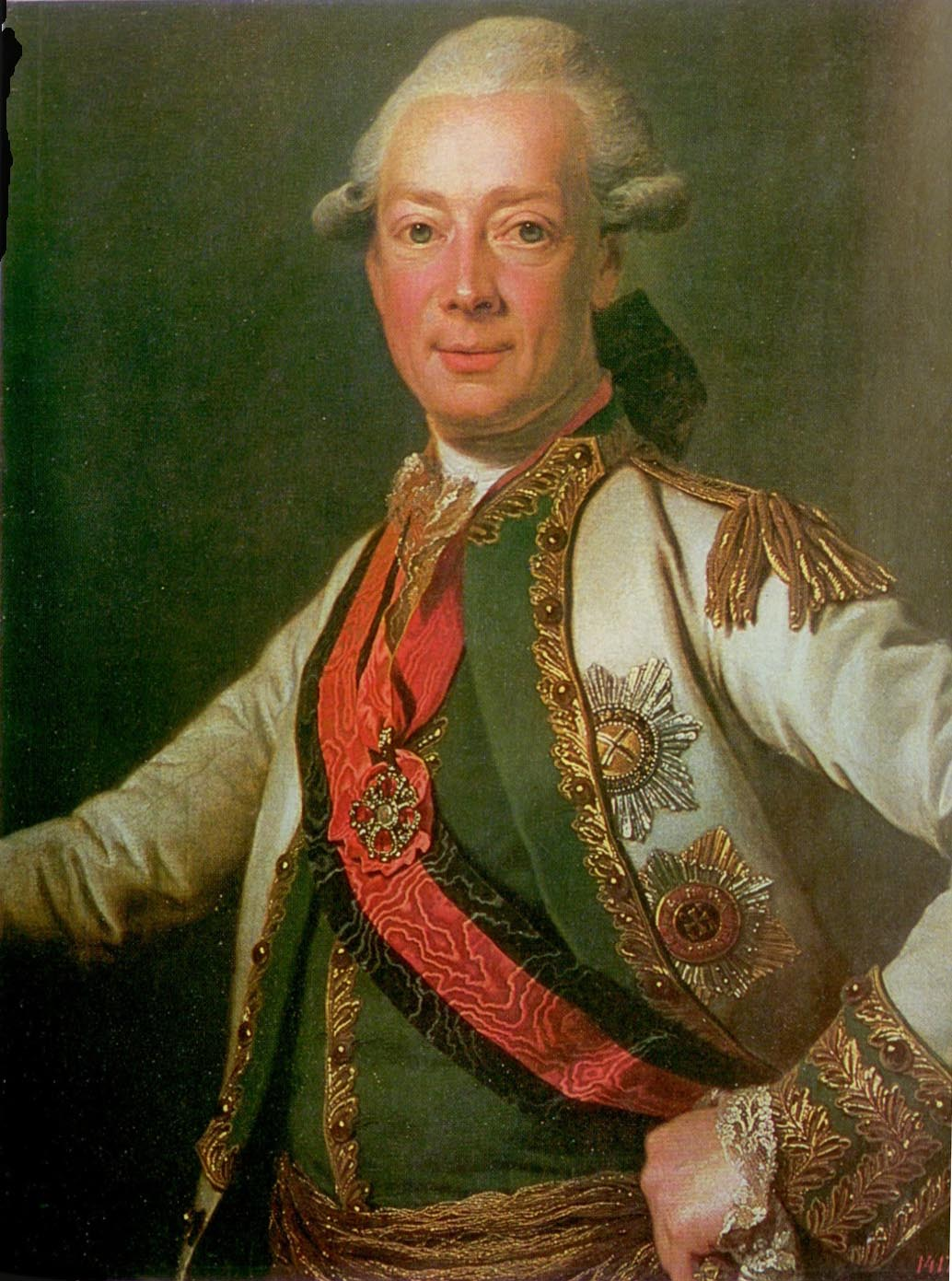
Portrait of Tchernyshov by Dmitry Levitzky

Count Ivan Grigoryevich Chernyshyov (Russian: Граф Иван Григорьевич Чернышёв; 1726–1797) was an Imperial Russian Field Marshal and General Admiral, prominent during the reign of Empress Catherine the Great.

== Life and career ==
He started his career serving under his more illustrious brother Zakhar Chernyshyov at the Russian missions in Copenhagen (1741) and Berlin (1742–45). In 1749 he was commanded to resign from diplomatic service and marry Countess Elizabeth Yefimovskaya, a cousin of Empress Elizabeth.

All three Chernyshov brothers backed Catherine in the coup that placed her on the Russian throne in 1762, after the assassination of her husband, Peter III. They were handsomely rewarded for their loyalty.

Catherine II first appointed Ivan Chernyshov to serve in the Governing Senate. In 1768, Chernyshov was awarded the role of Chief Plenipotentiary in London. On his return to Russia two years later, he was made Vice-President of the Admiralty; a position he retained until 1796. Being on friendly terms with Nikita Panin, the tutor and closest adviser to the future Emperor Paul, he was promoted to the rank of Navy Field Marshal upon the latter's ascension to the throne. By that time, Chernyshov's health was giving out and he had been living abroad for five years.

== Family ==
Two of the Field Marshal’s grandchildren were tied to the Decembrist plot to overthrow Tsar Nicholas I in 1825. His grandson, Zakhar Grigoryevich Chernyshov, was an active participant in the uprising. Zakhar’s sister, Alexandra ("Alexandrine") Chernysheva, was married to the author of the Decembrist constitution, Nikita Muravyov.

Chernyshov's niece, Natalya Petrovna Galitzine, better known at the Russian court as "Princesse Moustache", was romanticized by Pushkin under the name of The Queen of Spades in his eponymous story from 1834.

== Footnotes ==
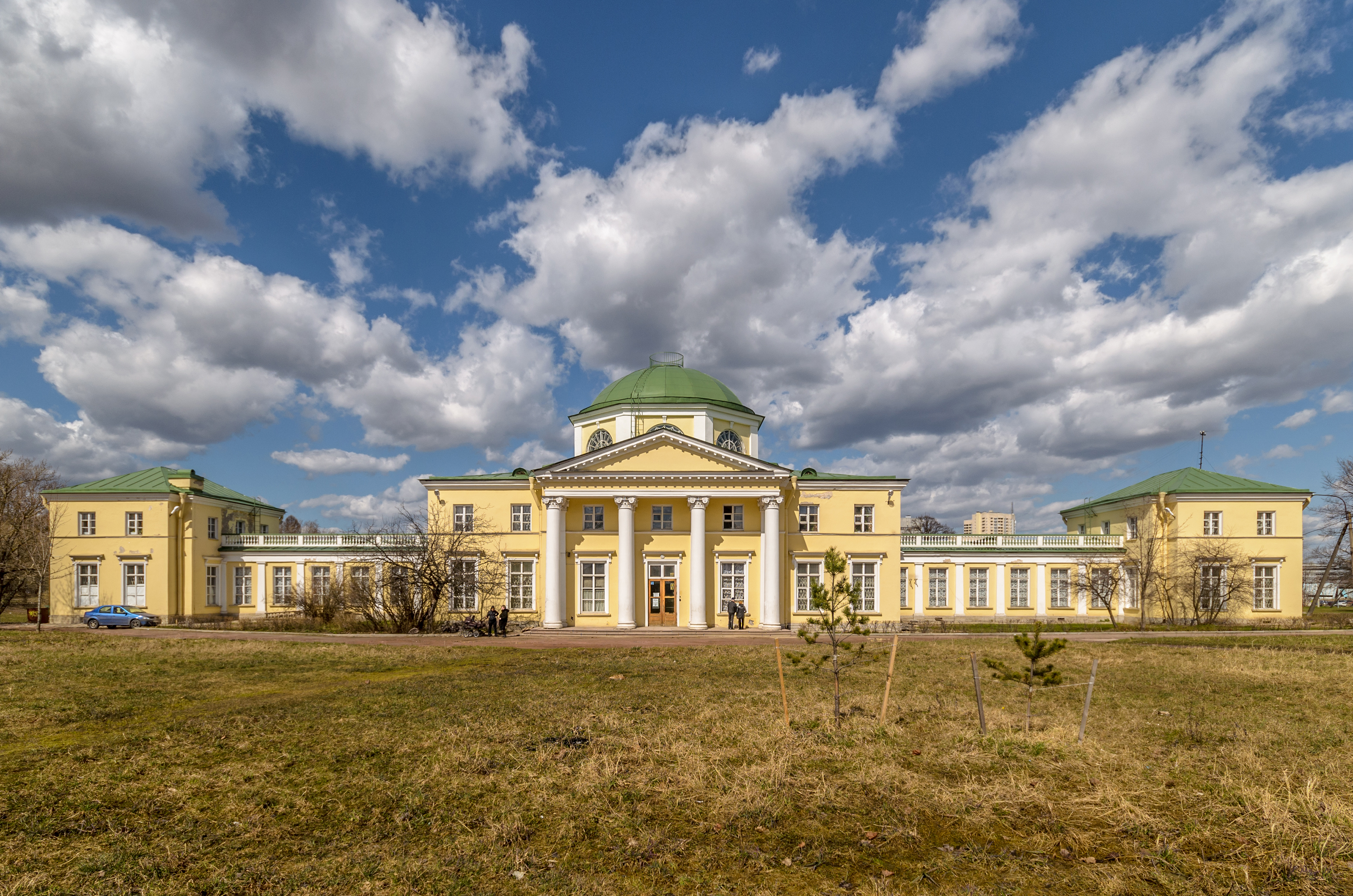
Aleksandrino, Count Chernyshov's estate
