= Collegium of Justice =

The Collegium of Justice (also College; Russian: Юстиц-коллегия) was a Russian executive body (collegium), created in the government reform of 1717. It was de-established during the decentralising reforms of Catherine II of Russia. Its first President was Andrey Matveev.
