= The Treasury (periodical) =

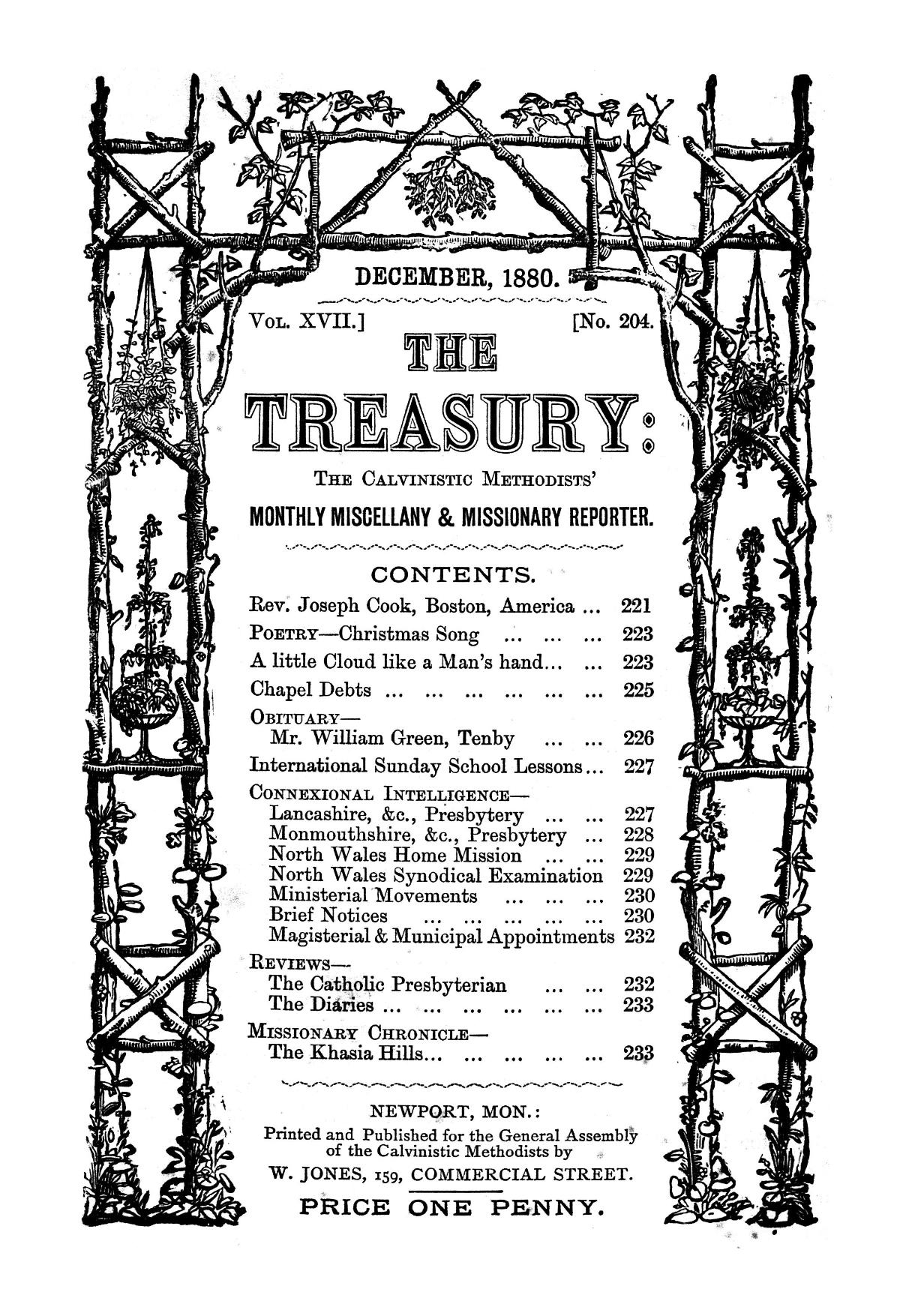
The treasury (Welsh Journal)

The Treasury was a Welsh 19th century periodical first produced, for the Calvinistic Methodists, by D. Williams in Llanelli in 1864. Monthly editions were produced, edited by minister Joseph Evans (1832-1909). Its articles highlighted religious subjects and denominational news. The journal has historical value as a record of the Evangelical Revival in Wales in the late 18th and early 19th century.
