= Zakhar Chernyshev =

Russian soldier and politician (1722–1784)

Count Zakhar Chernyshev
- Захаръ Чернышевъ
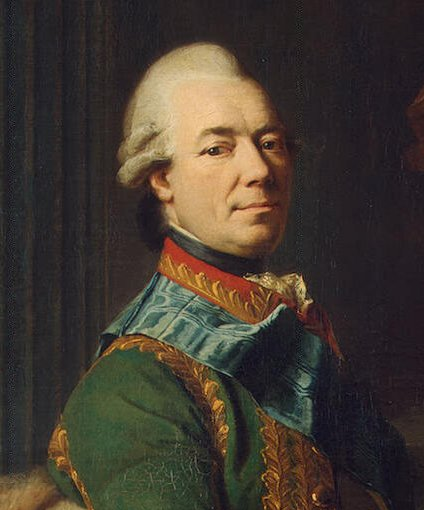
- Oil portrait of Chernyshev (1776 by Alexander Roslin)
- Born: 1722
- Died: 31 August 1784 (aged 61–62); Moscow, Russian Empire
- Awards: Order of Saint Vladimir
- Military career
- Allegiance: Russian Empire
- Service: Imperial Russian Army
- Years: 1735–1764
- Rank: General field marshal
- Conflicts: Seven Years' War; Battle of Kolín; Battle of Zorndorf; Occupation of Berlin
- Awards: Order of St. Andrew

Mayor of Moscow
- In office 1782–1784
- Monarch: Catherine II of Russia

Governor-general of Pskov and Mogilev Governorates
- In office 28 May 1772 – 1782
- Monarch: Catherine II of Russia

President of the College of War
- In office 4 March 1764 – August 1774
- Monarch: Catherine II of Russia

Zakhar Grigoryevich Chernyshev (Russian: Захаръ Григорьевичь Чернышевъ; 1722 – 31 August 1784) was a Russian noble, courtier to Catherine the Great, Imperial Russian Army officer, and Imperial Russian politician in the 18th century.

After made a courtier to then-Princess Sophie of Anhalt-Zerbst in 1744, Chernyshev remained a favorite of the future Russian monarch into the 1770s. An Imperial Russian Army officer during the Seven Years' War, Chernyshev retired in 1764, and would be ultimately promoted to general field marshal by Catherine II. At her appointment, Chernyshev led the College of War from 1764 to 1774, served as her governor-general of the Pskov and Mogilev Governorates, and was the mayor of Moscow until his death.

== Personal life ==
Born a Russian count in 1722, Zakhar Grigoryevich Chernyshev (Russian: Захаръ Григорьевичь Чернышевъ) was the older brother of Ivan and Andrei Chernyshev. By 1744, Chernyshev spoke Russian, French, and German.

When Princess Sophie of Anhalt-Zerbst was betrothed to Peter III of Russia in 1744, Chernyshev was chosen by Empress Elizabeth of Russia as one of three nobles to join the princess' personal court as a gentleman of the chamber. In 1745, Chernyshev's mother begged Empress Elizabeth to send her son away because she feared his infatuation with the Grand Duchess Catherine Alekseievna of Russia; Chernyshev was given a diplomatic assignment. When he returned to Saint Petersburg six years later, Chernyshev began actively courting the then-grand duchess: flattering Catherine, sending love letters, and finding occasion to recreate with the royal.

Chernyshev died unexpectedly on 31 August 1784 in Moscow.

== Military ==
Ranks held
Year	Name	Insignia
1741	Kapitan	
1750	Polkovnik	
1750	General-major	
by 1762	General	
1773	General-feldmarshal	

At the age of 13, Chernyshev joined the Imperial Russian Army in 1735, and was promoted to kapitan in 1741. In 1748, he was assigned to a regiment in Moscow, and in 1750, he was promoted to the ranks of polkovnik and general-major.

As an Imperial Russian general officer, Chernyshev commanded soldiers in the Seven Years' War. In 1757, he was at the Battle of Kolín, and in 1758, he joined forces with the Austrian army. For his leadership in the 1758 Battle of Zorndorf and the 1760 occupation of Berlin—capital of the Kingdom of Prussia, Chernyshev was awarded the Order of Saint Alexander Nevsky. In early 1762, then-General Chernyshev commanded a Russian corps of 16,000 infantry in Silesia that was attached to the Austrian army, fighting the Prussian kingdom. With the 1762 Treaty of Saint Petersburg, Peter III withdrew from the war and instead threw Russia's lot in with Prussia. Chernyshev was given command of the Russian forces now attached to the Prussian Army, and the Prussian monarch (Frederick the Great) awarded him the Order of the Black Eagle. When Emperor Peter III was replaced by Empress Catherine II later that year on 28 June, one of her first orders was to Chernyshev: immediately return to Russia with his corps, and if King Frederick interfered, "join the nearest army corps of her Imperial Roman Majesty, the empress of Austria [Maria Theresa]." Upon this change in alliances, Catherine II awarded Chernyshev with the Order of St. Andrew.

In November 1762, Chernyshev was one of ten military commanders convened by Catherine II for the purposes of reforming the Imperial Russian military. Chernyshev retired from the military in early 1764, citing "weak health and straitened finances."

== Politics ==
In 1742, Kapitan Chernyshev was sent to the Holy Roman Empire city of Vienna, where he worked under the Russian ambassador there, Ludovic Lanczynski. At his mother's urging, Empress Elizabeth next sent Chernyshev as her representative to the sejm of the Polish–Lithuanian Commonwealth in 1745.

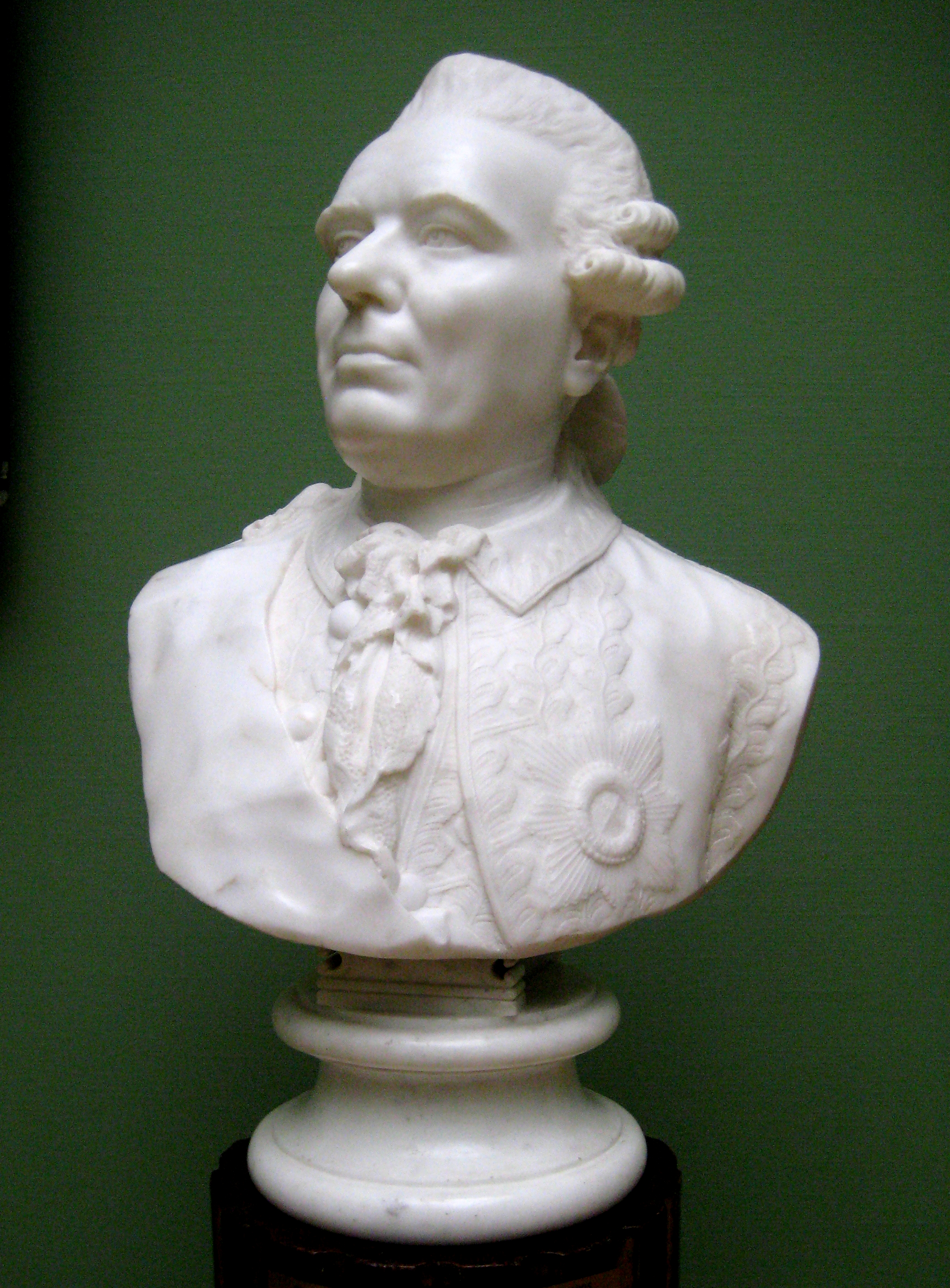
Bust of General Field Marshal Chernyshev (1774) by Fedot Shubin

On 4 March 1764, Catherine II appointed Chernyshev to the College of War's top post of vice-president. He was a Governing Senator in March 1765 when he was awarded 30,000 Russian rubles by Catherine II for his governmental service. When it first met on 4 November 1768, Chernyshev was on Catherine II's advisory council for the Russo-Turkish War, and in autumn 1773, he was appointed to the new position of War College president, along with a commiserate promotion to general field marshal, and advised Catherine II regarding Pugachev's Rebellion. Having lost Catherine II's favor to Lieutenant-General Grigory Potemkin, Chernyshev resigned from the College of War in August 1774.

=== Administration ===
Upon the 1772 First Partition of Poland, the Russian Partition consisted mostly of former Polish–Lithuanian Commonwealth territory in the drainage basin of the Vistula river: 92,000 square kilometres (36,000 sq mi) that became the Pskov and Mogilev Governorates. On 28 May 1772, Chernyshev was appointed these new governorates' governor-general. He still held this office in May 1780 when Catherine II met with Holy Roman Emperor Joseph II in Mogilev.

In 1782, Chernyshev was recalled to Moscow to serve as that city's mayor. He commissioned Matvey Kazakov, and had a luxury home built on Tverskaya Street that would house Muscovite mayors into the 20th century. During his tenure, he "renewed [and] decorated the ancient capital with many buildings". For his service, he was awarded the Order of Saint Vladimir by Catherine II.
