= Stepan Velyaminov =

Stepan Lukich Velyaminov (Russian: Степан Лукич Вельяминов; 1670–1737) was a Russian military and state figure, Major General, President of Collegium of Little Russia (1722–1727), privy councilor, senator.

He participated in the Great Northern War and for sometime performed duties of military commandant of Poltava city. In 1720–1722 he was a voivode of the Belgorod Province and commander of all Sloboda Ukraine cossack regiments. On instructions of the War Collegium, Velyaminov participated in fortification of the southern borders of Cossack Hetmanate. On 19 April 1722 as a brigadier he was appointed the president of the new Collegium of Little Russia (confirmed by the manifest of Emperor Peter the Great on 16 May 1722).

As the president of the Little Russian Collegium, Velyaminov made great efforts to implement in life a policy of the Tsarist government aimed at substantial narrowing of the Cossack Hetmanate autonomy, use of material resources of the land for the needs of whole empire, bringing into compliance with Russian norms the Ukrainian justice system and commerce, preparing foundation for complete annexation of the Left-bank Ukraine by the Russian Empire. He was a hard-liner against the opposition-minded Cossack officers by initiating their recall from Ukraine and imprisonment in Saint Petersburg the acting hetman Pavlo Polubotok and all Cossacks' General Officers.

Velyaminov prepared number of drafts about reformation of the system of power relations of the Cossack Hetmanate that in 1723 became a basis of legislative acts of Peter the Great and the Governing Senate. As the result of their realization, Velyaminov took over the functions of the Ukrainian Governor, subjected the Cossacks' General Military Chancellery and the local government. For success reached in reformation of the Hetmanate administrative system, Velyaminov was awarded a rank of Major General by Catherine I on 11 July 1726. At the same time Velyaminov became involved into a conflict over some properties with Alexander Menshikov who was a big landowner in Ukraine.
