= Collegium of Mining =

Executive body in the Russian Empire

The Collegium of Mining (Berg-kollegia; also College) was an executive body in the Russian Empire from 1722, when the Collegium of Mining and Manufacturing split into two. It was closed in 1783 under Catherine II of Russia, before being reopened in 1796.

Its Presidents were as follows:

H. W. Bruce (1719–1726)
A. K. Zybin (1726–1731)
A. F. Tomilov (1742–1753)
M. S. Opochinina (1753–1760)
I. A. Schlatter (1760–1767)
A. E. Musin-Pushkin (1767–1771)
M. F. Soymonov (1771–1781)
I. I Ryazanov (1781–1784)
A. A. Nartov (1796–1798)
A. B. Alyab'ev (1798–1802)
A. W. Korsakov (1802–1806)
