= Treasury (disambiguation) =

A treasury is a financial safe-house.

Treasury may also refer to:

== Arts, entertainment, and media ==
- A Treasury, a 2004 album by Nick Drake
- The Treasury (periodical), a 19th-century Welsh monthly for Calvinistic Methodists
- Anthology, a collection of works by one writer or multiple writers
- Omnibus edition, a collection of works, usually by a single writer

== Government and finance ==
- HM Treasury (His Majesty's Treasury), the treasury to the British government
- Ministry of the Treasury and Public Function, the treasury to the Spanish government
- Treasury (Australia), the treasury to the Australian government
- Treasury Board of Canada, a Cabinet committee of the Queen's Privy Council for Canada
- Treasury Board of Canada Secretariat, a central agency of the Canadian federal government
- New Zealand Treasury, the treasury to the New Zealand government
- United States Department of the Treasury, the treasury to the U.S. federal government
- United States Treasury security, a government security

== Other uses ==
- The Treasury (store), a defunct chain of discount stores owned by JCPenney
- The Treasury, a building in Singapore, occupied by the Ministry of Finance
- Treasury Casino, Brisbane, Australia

== See also ==
- Al Khazneh (lit. The Treasury), a temple in Petra, Jordan
