= Collegium of Manufacturing =

Executive body in the Russian Empire

The Collegium of Manufacturing (Manufaktur-kollegia; also College) was an executive body in the Russian Empire from 1722, when the Collegium of Mining and Manufacturing split into two.
