= Collegium of Mining and Manufacturing =

The Collegium of Mining and Manufacturing (also College) was a Russian executive body (collegium), created in the government reform of 1717. Their first President was Ivan Musin-Pushkin.

In 1722, the collegium was split up into two separate bodies: the Collegium of Mining and the Collegium of Manufacturing.
