= Mineral tax =

Excise on mineral resources

A mineral tax is any tax, excise or other government-imposed fee on mineral resources, such as crude oil or ores. The taxation of minerals serves as a price to extract scarce resources, such as petroleum and crude oil, which are owned by the government. By taxing minerals, the government is able to secure a certain share of the minerals. Mineral taxes should possess neutral characteristics, to maintain incentives for investors and maximize the tax revenue for the government, while minimizing the variability and uncertainty of the amount of tax money collected. Since the 1950s it is more common to use special taxes like royalty taxes with ordinary taxes. Taxing minerals is the more economic approach to incentivise environmental thinking and an alternative to intervene in the market directly.

== Level of taxation ==
The decision about the size of the tax influences the allocative decisions of the firms. If the government sets a tax which firms consider as too high, they will extract less minerals, and tax revenues for the government will be low. But mineral mines will live longer, since there is less exploitation. If on the other hand the imposed tax is too low, firms will extract more, and the mines will live shorter. On top of that tax revenues for the government would be low, too. That leads to a Laffer curve-shaped function of tax revenue for the government, in which the “optimal level of taxation” is somewhere in the middle.

Any mineral tax must be neutral. Neutral is defined as maintaining incentives for investors to exploit minerals. Therefore, the revenues must exceed the costs. Furthermore, the government must be able to rely on the amount of tax money it receives, therefore, the tax imposed must be as certain and as steady as possible.

Often, governments decide to use a combination of different taxes, where one of them is a Pigovian tax, or a similar tax, to reach an "efficient outcome" by maintaining incentives for firms and representing public interests in keeping a certain share of minerals.

Mineral taxes vary by country. They vary not only in height, but also in the amount of taxes on minerals imposed. In the US for example the most common tax in the mining industry is the property tax on mining. Furthermore, there are different rules and taxes in different states.

== Various mineral taxes ==
For the government, the objective is to reach an “efficient outcome”. There are various possibilities of taxing minerals. All imposable mineral taxes fulfil different purposes, and there is an ongoing scientific process about which tax shall be imposed why and when.

=== Profits tax ===
The profits tax is imposed on the profits of a firm. In general, this doesn't change the behaviour of the firm, because they still want to maximize their profits. Since the tax due increases with increasing profits, this is a progressive tax. However, in the field of mining, it is difficult to implement this tax, since it is problematic to compute economic depreciation, e.g.: “the treatment of depletion allowances and exploration” The profits tax is a direct tax.

=== Resource rent tax ===
To tax the net present value of a firm in the mining industry, a resource rent tax is used. This tax will only be paid by firms with a positive Cash Flow. For firms with a negative cash flow, the government will choose an interest rate until the cumulative net cash flow turns positive again. Then a flat rate tax is applied, and the accumulated negative cash flows will be taxed. Under two assumptions regarding the interest rate and the cash flow, this tax has no impact on the firms’ allocative decision. As the profits tax, the resource rent tax is direct tax.

=== Royalty tax ===
The royalty tax is an indirect tax, and has been historically the most important mineral tax. When the production starts, the tax is due. That generates up-front revenues for the government. A different approach of the royalty tax is, to impose it as a factor payment for extraction of minerals. If royalty taxes are very high, it might influence the production, because it gets too expensive for the firms to produce and extract minerals.

=== Brown tax ===
The Brown tax taxes the cash flow by using a flat rate tax. If a Brown tax is used, firms with a negative cash flows receive subsidies from the government. This is the difference to the resource rent tax, and leads to the fact that the government doesn't have to choose a certain interest rate. It fulfils the neutral criteria of the tax, but tax revenues are not as certain as possible, since firms’ cash flows are not always forecastable.

=== Franchise tax ===
The franchise tax has the same characteristics as a static analysed Lump-sum tax. Therefore, the tax doesn't change the allocative decisions of the firms.

=== Taxes on output ===
Fixed payments per unit of gross output are the signature of taxes on output. There are mainly two different types on taxes of output, specific and Ad valorem tax.

=== Property tax ===
Under the property tax, the mineral reserves at the end of each period are taxed. This tax can be imposed on e.g. the net present value. This tax induces faster extraction since this the base of the tax declines over time. Therefore, the mineral reserves increase.

== Environmental concerns and mineral tax ==
The extraction of minerals, and therefore the cumulative extraction leads to environmental damage. Thus, a conflict of interests between environmentalists, governments and firms exists. Since different taxes cause different strategies of firms, the protection of the environment is an important part of taxing minerals. Some taxes, as the property tax, increase extraction, which leads to environmental externalities. One of the goals of mineral taxing is therefore to internalize externalities by imposing the right tax. The Pigovian tax, or a nearly similar tax, serves as part of a combination to reach this objective. Taxes can initiate environmental behaviour, and can serve as a market-based alternative to intervening directly by regulating.

== See also ==
- Rain tax
- Mineral Resource Rent Tax (Australia)
- Royalty payment
- Excise Tax
- Fuel tax
