= Collegium of State Income =

The Collegium of State Income (Russian: Камер-коллегия, romanized: Kamer-kollegiya; also known as the Collegium of State Revenue) was a Russian executive body (collegium), created in the government reform of 1717. It was abolished during the decentralising reforms of Catherine II of Russia in 1785, restored 12 years later by her successor Paul I, and finally abolished again in 1801. It was responsible for the management of state fees and some branches of the economy such as agriculture. Later, some of its affairs were transferred to other collegia.

== Presidents ==
1. Dmitry Golitsyn (1718–22)
2. Gerasim Koshelev (1722)
3. Alexey Pleshcheyev (1723–25)
4. Alexander Naryshkin (1725–27)
5. Dmitry Golitsyn (1727–32)
6. Sergey Golitsyn (1732–35)
7. Pyotr Melgunov (1735–37)
8. Ivan Bibikov (1737–42)
9. Grigory Kislovsky (1742–53)
10. Mikhail Shakhovskoy (1753–60)
11. Ivan Yushkov (1760–62)
12. Boris Kurakin (1762–64)
13. Alexey Melgunov (1764–77)
14. Mikhail Shcherbatov (1778–84)
15. Vasily Popov (1797–99)
16. Alexey Kozhin (1799–1801)
17. Ignaty Theils (1801)

== See also ==
- Kamer-Kollezhsky rampart in Moscow, named after Kamer-kollegiya.
