= College of War =

Russian executive body (1717–1802)

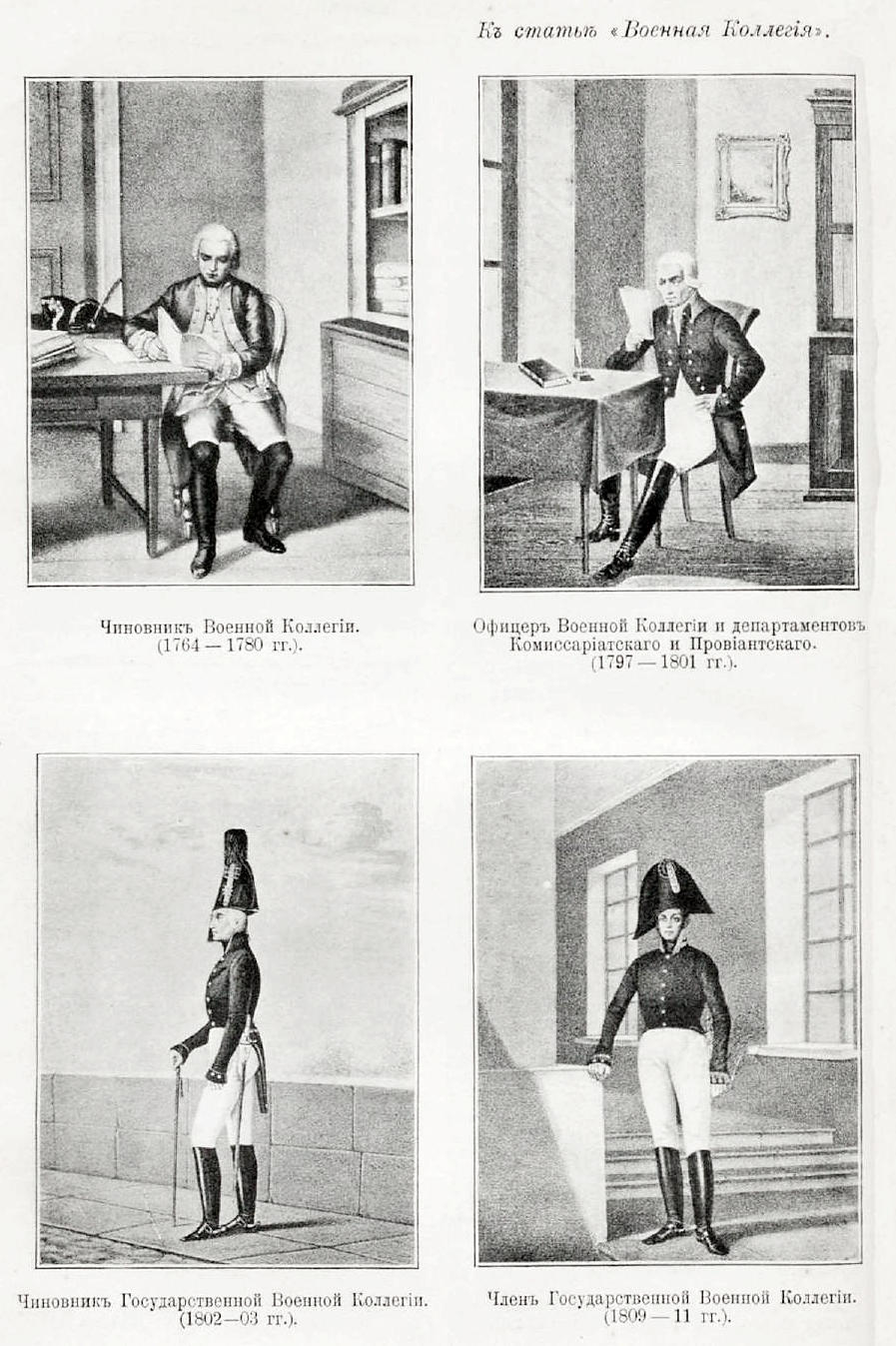
College of War

The College of War (sometimes War Collegium, or similar, but not to be confused with other institutions of the same name) was a Russian executive body (or collegium), created in the government reform of 1717. It was the only one of the six original and three later colleges to survive the decentralising reforms of Catherine II of Russia. Under Paul I, it became the model for a newly centralised government.

The College of War contained several functional departments which operated independently, but under the overall supervision of the college and its President; after 1798 there were to be seven sections. In 1802 it became the Ministry of Land Forces, although this resulted in no fundamental change to the nature of the institution.

== History ==
Peter the Great has established it by the decree, in 1719, was announced it establishing, following the example of foreign powers to control military and ground forces, from January 1, 1720, it began to operate.

It had a president, a vice president, 4 advisers (in the ranks of the generals) and 4 assessors (in the regimental ranks). The Military Board had the Chancellery divided into expeditions for the management of cavalry and infantry, for garrison affairs, fortification and artillery management, for keeping logs of incoming and outgoing papers. The procedure for the proceedings in cases was determined by the General Regulation of February 28 (March 10) of 1720. In 1720, in the Military Collegium there were 13 class officials, 47 clerics and 8 other servants, and 454 soldiers and non-commissioned officers attached to the college. In 1720, three foreigners served in the Military Collegium, but 82 full-time members of the college were still vacant due to the lack of qualified specialists [the source is not specified 594 days].

The military board was divided into three expeditions:

- army;
- garrison;
- artillery and fortification.

Moreover, it had the general-auditor, the general-fiscal and the chief auditor. The prosecutor followed the legality of the decision-making process carried out by the Military Board. The prosecutor was directly subordinate to the prosecutor-general.

Subsequently, with the increase in the number of troops, the duties of the higher military administration were to increase too, thus, the new expeditions were established under the military board. In 1798, it was divided into army, garrison, foreign, recruitment, repair and training expeditions; in addition, it has military, counting, inspecting, commissariat, food and artillery, general auditorium, drawing with the archive and Moscow artillery depot expeditions.

A few decades later (September 7, 1802) under Alexander I, the military board was transformed into a military ministry.

== Presidents ==
The highest official in the management body was the president (of the year).

- Prince Alexander Menshikov (1717–24)
- Prince Anikita Repnin (1724–26)
- Prince Mikhail Golitsin (1728–30)
- Prince Vasily Vladimirovich Dolgorukov (1730–31)
- Count Burkhard Christoph von Munnich (1732–41)
- Prince Nikita Trubetskoy (1760–63)
- Count Zakhar Chernyshev (1763–74)
- Prince Grigory Potemkin (1774–91)
- Count Nikolay Saltykov (1791–1802)

== Vice presidents ==
The vice-president (of the year) was the deputy top executive in the management body:

- Herman Jensen Bohn (1727—1731)
- Burkhard Christoph von Münnich (1731—1732)
- Stepan Fyodorovich Apraksin (1742—?)
- Zakhar Chernyshev (1762—?)
- Nikolai Saltykov (1773—74)
- Grigory Potemkin (1774—1784)
- Valentin Platonovich Musin-Pushkin (1786—?)

== See also ==
- List of heads of the military of Imperial Russia
