= Pavel Yaguzhinsky =

Russian statesman and diplomat

Pavel Ivanovich Yaguzhinsky
- Павел Иванович Ягужинский
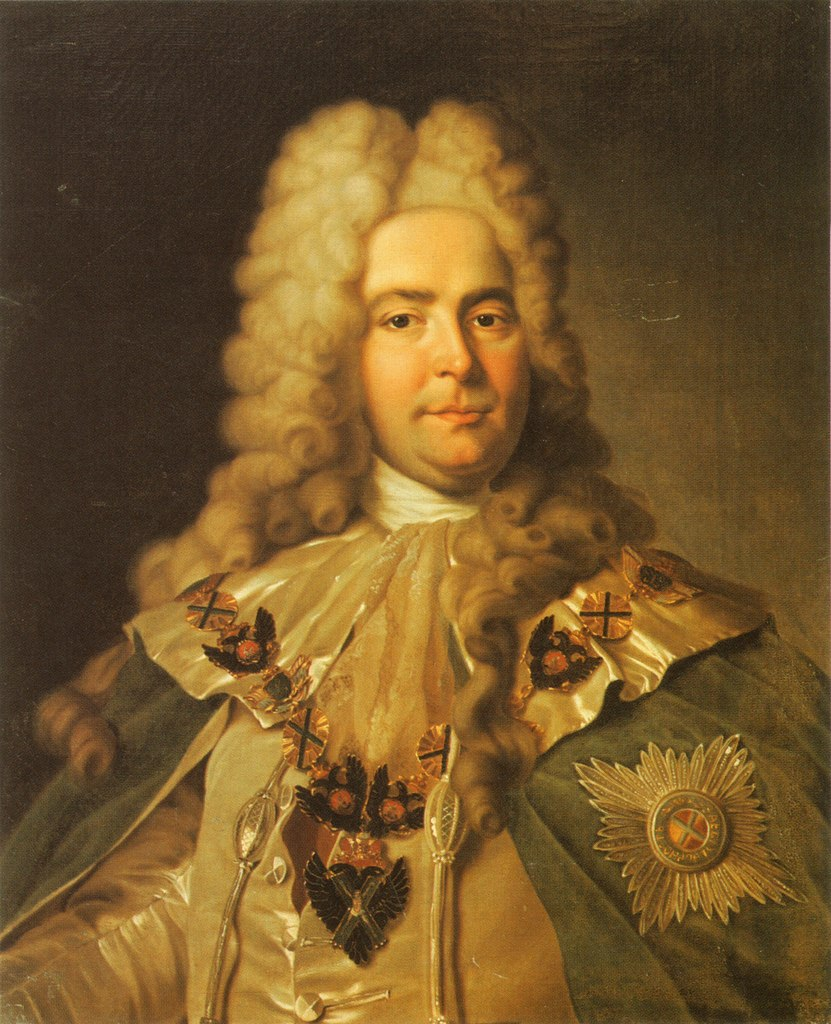

Prosecutor General
- In office 12 January 1722 – 1726
- In office 1730 – 6 April 1735
- Preceded by: Position established
- Succeeded by: Nikita Trubetskoy

Personal details
- Born: 1683 Kublici, Polotsk Voivodeship, Grand Duchy of Lithuania, Polish–Lithuanian Commonwealth
- Died: 17 April 1736 (aged 52–53) Saint Petersburg
- Resting place: Annunciation Church of the Alexander Nevsky Monastery
- Spouse: Anna Bestuzheva-Ryumina
- Relations: Yaguzhinsky family
- Children: Sergey Yaguzhinsky
- Awards: Order of Saint Andrew; Order of Saint Alexander Nevsky

Military service
- Rank: General-in-chief

The Count (from 1731) Pavel Ivanovich Yaguzhinsky (Yagushinsky) (1683, in Grand Duchy of Lithuania – 17 April 1736, in Saint Petersburg) was a Russian statesman and diplomat, associate of Peter the Great, Chamberlain (1712), Ober-Stallmeister (1727), General-in-chief (1727), the first Attorney General in Russian history (1722–1726, 1730–1735). He was famous for his honesty and integrity, which Peter the Great appreciated in him in the first place.

== Origin ==
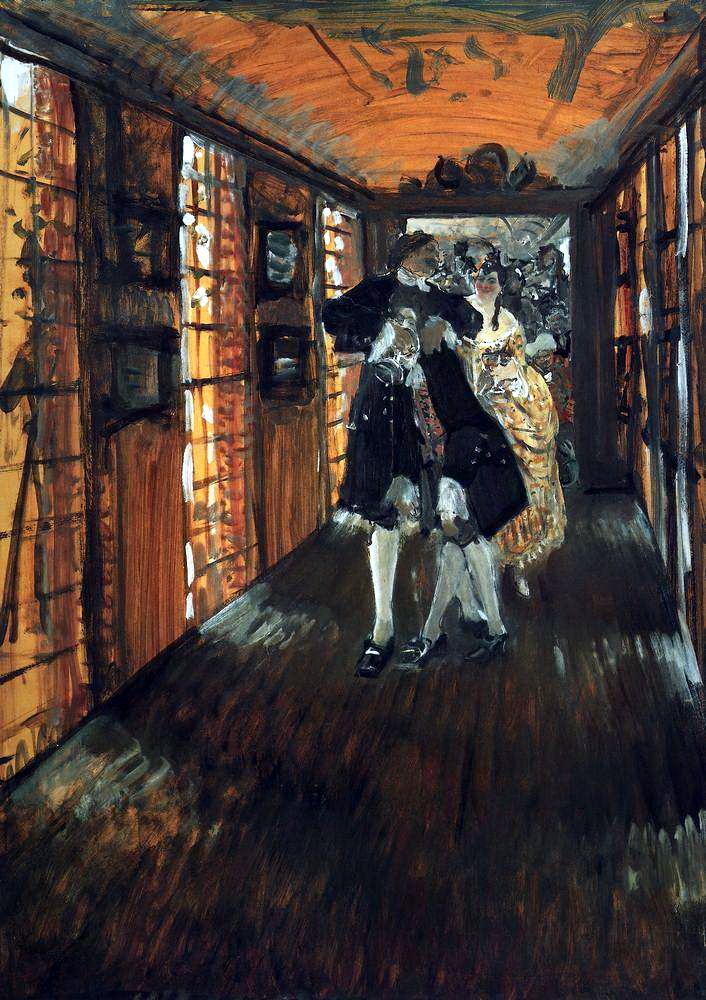
If someone was found guilty in violation of etiquette at the assembly, it was supposed to drain the 1.5-liter "Cup of the Big Eagle". This moment is depicted on the sketch of Valentin Serov

The son of the organist Yaguzhinsky, a native of Lithuania, he probably originated from the town of Kublichi of the Połock Voivodeship of the Grand Duchy of Lithuania (the Kublichi area now forms part of the Ushachy district of Vitebsk Region in present-day Belarus). In 1687, together with his father's family, he arrived in Russia.

Thanks to his sharpness and sense of duty, he proved himself in the service of Fedor Golovin (as a page, then as a Page of the Chamber). In 1701 he was enlisted in the guard, in the Preobrazhensky Regiment, becoming the orderly of Tsar Peter the Great in place of Menshikov. He converted from Lutheranism to Russian Orthodoxy.

== Diplomatic missions of Peter I ==
In 1710 – the captain of the Preobrazhensky Regiment. He married Anna Feodorovna Khitrovo and received a large dowry for her, which included, among other things, the village of Avchurino (manor) and the village of Sergeevskoye (now Plavsk). Even earlier (9 July 1706), an island on the Yauza River near German Settlement was received from Peter I into eternal possession.

During the Northern War, Yaguzhinsky regularly performed Peter's diplomatic missions, and in 1713 traveled abroad with him. In 1711 he participated in the Prut campaign. In the same year, he accompanied Peter to Carlsbad and Torgau to the wedding of Tsarevich Alexei. In June 1711 he received the rank of colonel, on 3 August 1711 – Adjutant general. On 19 February 1712 he became the second in Russian history (after Semyon Naryshkin) who was granted the rank of chamberlain.

Yaguzhinsky is one of the few who attended the king's marriage to Marta Skavronskaya. In November 1713 he was sent to the Copenhagen court with the notice of the arrival of Peter the Great with the army in the duchy of Mecklenburg. In 1714, he again came to Denmark in order to, together with the resident Vasily Dolgorukov, urge the Danish crown to fulfill allied obligations.

After the establishment of the collegiums in 1718, Yaguzhinsky was entrusted with the observation of the "soonest possible establishment of colleges by their presidents". A year later, he took part in the Åland Congress, then in 1720–21 he represented the interests of Russia at the Viennese court of the emperor of the Holy Roman Empire, where he found a troupe of comedians for the king.

Yaguzhinsky left for the Nystad Congress on 24 August 1721, but at the request of his rival Osterman, the Vyborg commandant Ivan Shuvalov delayed him in Vyborg for two whole days, and when Pavel Yaguzhinsky arrived in Nystad, the peace was already concluded.

== Creation of assemblies and divorce with wife ==
As a young man, Yaguzhinsky had the reputation of "a cheerful interlocutor, a jovial and tireless dancer", as well as the king of all dances, who keenly followed the visits to the assemblies and compiled lists of the absent courtiers for the king. Not a single assembly, when Yaguzhinsky was in Russia, did not do without his presence, and if, having drunk, he would start dancing, he would dance till drop. Loving the fun, festive life, Yaguzhinsky led it on a grand scale, spending on furnishings, servants, trips, and other things. Peter the Great, needing luxurious carriages for ceremonial receptions, more than once temporarily took them from Yaguzhinsky. "Having established the obligatory assemblies, Peter laid them under the supervision of Yaguzhinsky, and in this position he showed the same zeal, diligence and speed with which he carried out all the orders of his sovereign".

The marriage of Yaguzhinsky with a rich and well-born heiress, which took place with the live participation of Peter the Great, Anna Feodorovna Khitrovo (1701–1733), was unsuccessful. Yaguzhinsky, accompanying the emperor, was often on the road. His wife, separated from her children, lived mainly in Moscow, where she could not boast of exemplary behavior:

...running away from home and spending the night god knows where, once, by the way, in her gardener's hut, she met many obscene and suspicious ladies, wandered out of the house naked, galloped "forty", broke into the church, insulted the priest and threw on the floor sacred objects.

In 1721, at the wedding of Yuri Trubetskoy, there was a public quarrel between Yaguzhinsky and his wife, according to the ceremony she had to dance with her husband, but refused. Bergholz, who saw her in 1722, wrote that she almost did not go anywhere and living in Saint Petersburg did not leave the house, as she was constantly ill and was suffering from "melencolia".

Soon, Anna Feodorovna was placed in one of the Moscow monasteries, and Yaguzhinsky, partly due to the insistence of Peter I, addressed the Synod with a request for divorce "so that I would not continue in such a disastrous and otherwise life, but my poor little children would not have suffered from such an indecent mother". Yaguzhinskaya justified her, saying that "she did these indecent acts in her unconsciousness and melancholy, which happened in Petersburg in 1721, and in grief and sorrow from separation from her roommate and children, from boredom and loneliness".

It was one of the first divorce proceedings in Russia and, of course, it caused a lot of talk. Valishevsky argues that even before the beginning of the divorce, Yaguzhinsky had found a prominent bride — one of the daughters of the great Chancellor Golovkin named Anna. The permission to divorce was followed on 21 August 1723, and on 10 November Saint Petersburg was celebrating a magnificent wedding. According to Bassevich, Yaguzhinsky "was just as pleased with his second wife as his emperor was pleased with emperor's wife".

At the request of Yaguzhinsky, his first wife, by the decree of Empress Catherine I, was imprisoned in the Theodore Monastery "until the end of her days", from where she tried to escape twice, but was caught. She died, having lived in a monastery for ten years, as a nun with the name of Agafya.

== Attorney General ==
From 22 January 1722 – lieutenant-general. Four days earlier, he was appointed the first ever Prosecutor General of the Governing Senate. In modern terminology, this post corresponds to the Attorney General. His duties included the fight against embezzlement:

And, as a matter of fact, this is our only eye and a contentious of state affairs, that it is necessary to act faithfully for the sake of it, because the first will be charged on it.

— From the decree of Peter I on the introduction of the post of Prosecutor General

According to the characteristics of the Soviet historical encyclopedia, the first prosecutor general "was distinguished by directness, honesty and integrity, tirelessness in the work". There is a case in which, irritated by the general embezzlement, Peter I demanded in the Senate to adopt a law according to which everyone who steals more than a piece of rope from the state will be on this rope hanged. Shocked senators depressed silent. Finally, the almighty prosecutor general Pavel Yaguzhinsky, an honest and charming alcoholic, answered the king that then Peter would not have a single citizen, because "we all steal, who are more, who are less". Shocked by this answer that entered the history of Russia, the tsar did not dare to adopt such a law. The emperor tirelessly noted the merits of Yaguzhinsky.

In May 1724, at the establishment of the coronation of Catherine I of the Chevalier Guard Regiment, he was appointed its commander with the rank of lieutenant captain. Received in eternal possession of Mishin Island in the mouth of the Neva. In 1720, a three-storey stone house was built for Yaguzhinsky under the project of Georg Mattarnovi and Nikolai Gerbel on the Neva Embankment.

As prosecutor general, Yaguzhinsky served as a counterweight to the powerful Prince Menshikov and somewhat limited his appetites. At the court in Yaguzhinsky, they saw "the accuser and enemy of all those personal and self-seeking aspirations" that were characteristic of "Peter's nestlings". After Catherine I assumed the throne, the procurator general began to quarrel openly with Menshikov, who had strengthened his position, still did not miss a single court drinking party, and during the vigil in Peter and Paul Cathedral appealed for protection to the coffin of the late emperor, so they feared that he might "in a fit of despair, lay hands on himself".

After the establishment of the Supreme Privy Council and the establishment of the Menshik omnipotence, Yaguzhinsky left the post of procurator-general and was sent, on 3 August 1726, as plenipotentiary minister to the Polish Sejm in Grodno, where the issue of Courland succession was examined. Since 24 October 1727 he was a general-in-chief, although he did not serve in the army for a long time.

== Conflict with Osterman ==
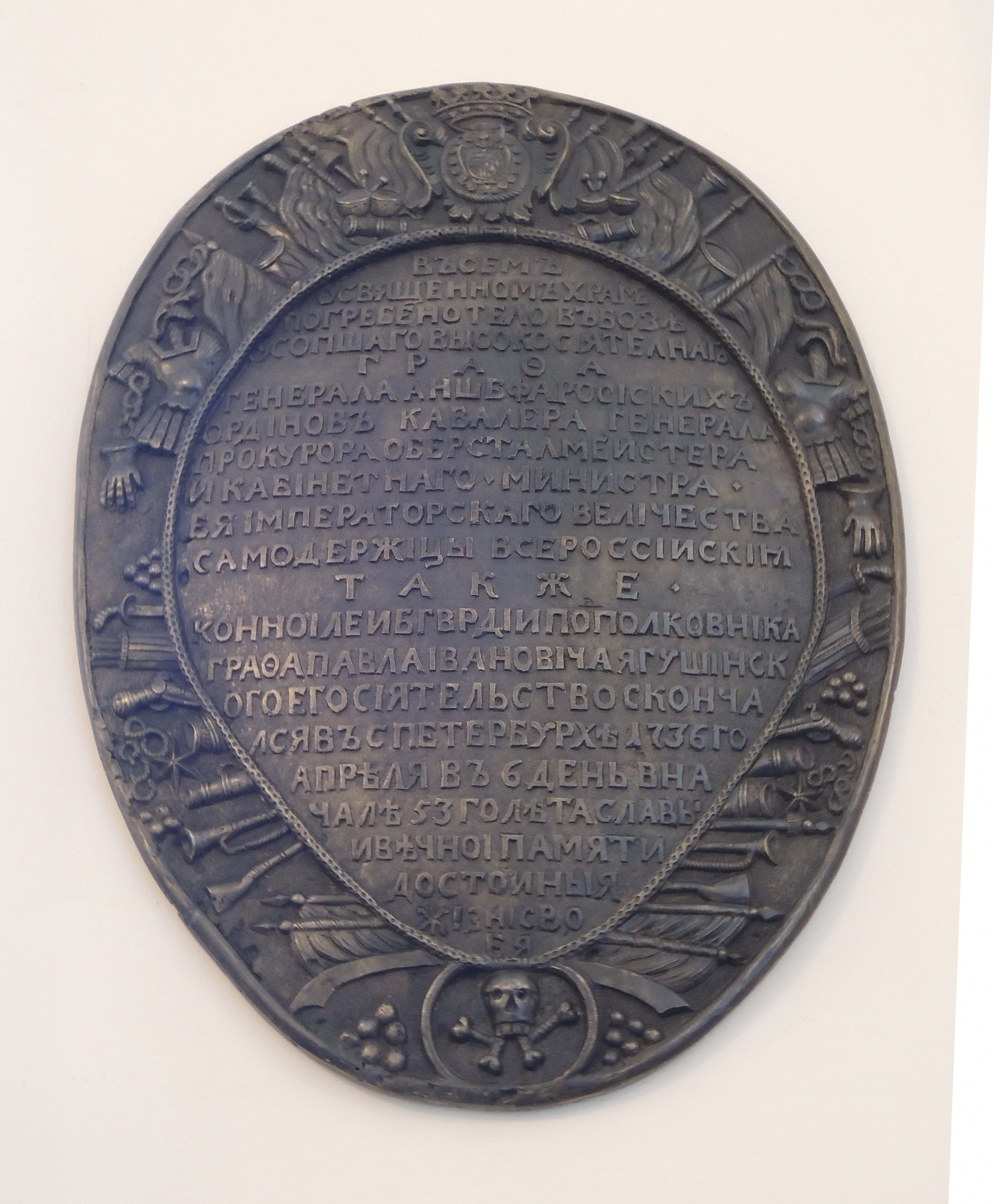
The inscription on the grave of Yaguzhinsky

Ober-Stallmeister Yaguzhinsky, in subsequent administrations, was maneuvering between opposing court factions with some success. In January 1730, he participated in the conspiracy of the "supremes", but, having lost faith in its success, on 20 January he informed Anna Ioannovna of everything, explaining to her that most nobles did not want to limit her power. On 16 January 1730 he was arrested, but soon released.

Anna Ioannovna fully rewarded the renegade. By decree of the Empress on 4 March 1730, Yaguzhinsky was appointed senator. In the same year (20 December), a rich Siberian Order was subordinated, from which he was to receive a salary "by rank". From 31 December 1730 – Lieutenant Colonel of the Life Guard Horse Regiment. In the period from 2 October 1730 to 1731 – the Prosecutor General of the Senate. On his initiative, the first Russian Cadet Corps was created. On 19 January 1731 he was awarded the title of count.

Quarrel with Osterman put an end to influence of Yaguzhinsky. On the day when Osterman celebrated the receipt of the title of count, Yaguzhinsky drank too much and began to shower his enemy in a foul language, for which the empress only slightly scolded him. The vice-chancellor, who did not forget the offense, soon achieved the establishment of the Cabinet of Ministers and the transfer of basic governmental functions to this body. Yaguzhinsky saw power slipping from his hands.

Old scenes were repeated: indecent antics, quarrel, abuse. Again Golovkin underwent stormy scenes. Yaguzhinsky everywhere where he could swears abused the Germans, and, finally, not only cursed and quarreled with Biron, but also exposed his sword against him. Biron was even less inclined than Menshikov to endure the wild antics of Yaguzhinsky. Everyone thought he was a dead man and assumed the exile to Siberia was the most lenient punishment he could expect.

— Russian Biographical Dictionary (Volume XXV, pages 21-22)

The Empress ordered Yaguzhinsky to leave her court and sent him to another honorary exile – ambassador to Berlin. At the same time he was deprived of the ober-stallmeister court position (1732). However, two years later, Biron, having no means to overcome Osterman's influence, began to bother about Yaguzhinsky's return to Russia. On 28 April 1735 he entered into the Cabinet of Ministers with the return of the post of ober-stallmeister.

From 28 April 1735 to 6 April 1736 – Cabinet Minister.

Biron was delighted with the new minister and believed him in everything. The offices of foreign sovereigns instructed their ministers to seek the favors of Yaguzhinsky. Ambassadors were proud of friendship with him, and Prince Radziwill sought the hand of his daughter. Yaguzhinsky put the case in such a way that either he broke Osterman, or he disappears. He already took into his hands his former power. His officials were especially afraid of his sentences and decisions, because, with impeccable justice, they were always very strict and quickly carried out. Contemporaries followed with attention and interest the growth of Yaguzhinsky's power and waited for the struggle for power to begin between him and Osterman.

— Russian Biographical Dictionary (Volume XXV, pages 22-23)

Yaguzhinsky's health was already shaken long ago, and not so much by the busy life and the exorbitant work that he carried without rest for many years, as by binges and all sorts of excesses. With his age of 52 and gout, he should have had a more modest lifestyle. But he did not let up, he invariably attended dances and feasts, where he drank without lagging behind others. In January 1736, he fell ill with fever, which was complicated by gout attacks, and died in April of the same year. He was buried in the Annunciation Church of the Alexander Nevsky Monastery. His second-hand widow married the diplomat Mikhail Bestuzhev-Ryumin. In 1743, in a Lopukha case, she was publicly carved with a whip and sent to Yakutsk exile.

== Reviews of contemporaries ==
In notes, the Spanish ambassador, the Duke of Lyria, reports about him:

He was a Pole of very low descent, came to Russia in the very young years, he accepted the Russian faith and Peter I liked him so much that his sovereign loved him dearly until his death. He didn't know too much about military affairs, and he didn't hide it himself, but he was a clever, capable, courageous and decisive man. Having fallen in love with someone once, he remained a sincere friend to him, and if he became an enemy, then he became obvious. They said that he was lying, but I did not notice this vice in him. Deciding on anything, he was firm in the performance of this and was very attached to his sovereigns. But if he happened to drink an extra glass of wine, then he could do a lot of stupid things; however, after leaving this bad habit, he became completely different. In short, it was one of the most capable people in Russia.

—

== Awards ==
- Order of Saint Andrew (11 July 1724)
- Order of Saint Alexander Nevsky (30 August 1725)

== Family ==
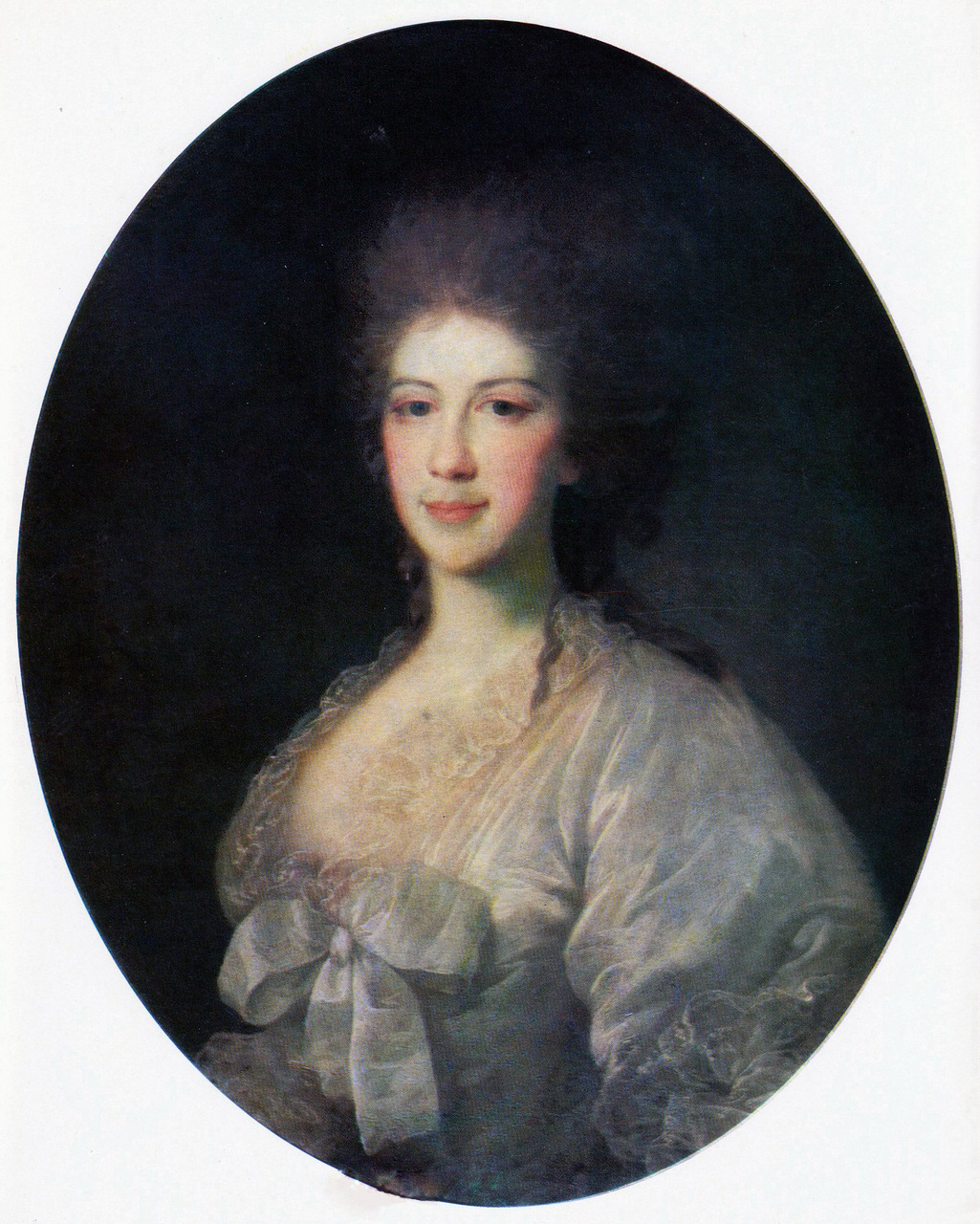
Countess Praskovya Yaguzhinskaya, married Princess Gagarin

1. Wife from 1710, Anna Fedorovna Khitrovo (died 30 July 1733), the only daughter of the clerk Fedor Alexandrovich Khitrovo (died 1703), the granddaughter of Alexander Khitrovo, a rich and influential man. Divorced in 1723. Couple had children:
  - ...Pavlovich (died on 9 August 1724), in 1723 he was sent by his father to study in Germany, where he died.
  - Catherine Pavlovna (1713/14–1738), married from 1730 to Vasily Lopukhin (1711-1757).
  - Natalya Pavlovna (1716–1786), was married to Lieutenant-General Fedor Ivanovich Golovin (1704-1758).
  - Praskovya Pavlovna (171...–1775), from 1738, married to Senator Prince Sergei Gagarin (1713—1782). In 1743, she and her husband were involved in the well-known Lopukhina case, which, however, did not have bad consequences for them, they were saved by the ignorance of the German language, although all the conversations took place in their presence.
2. Wife from 10 November 1723 was Anna Gavrilovna Golovkina (170...—1751), maid of honor, daughter of the Chancellor Count Gavriil Golovkin. Had a son and three daughters.
  - Sergei Pavlovich (1731–1806), was promoted to lieutenant-general, was married by his first marriage to Anastasia Ivanovna Shuvalova, sister of Ivan Shuvalov; the second on Barbara Nikolaevna Saltykova (1749–1843), died without leaving heirs.
  - Maria Pavlovna (1732–1755), Maid of Honor, on 14 February 1748 was married to Count Andrei Mikhailovich Efimovskiy (1717–1767) with the court marshal of the courtyard.
  - Anna Pavlovna (1733–1801), maid of honor, from 1754 wife of Count Peter Apraksin, later became a nun under the name of Augusta.

== Artistic images ==
- Yury Tynyanov («Wax Figure», 1930)
- Viktor Dobrovolsky («Peter the Great», 1937)
- Oleg Tabakov («How Czar Peter the Great Married Off His Moor», 1976)
- Vyacheslav Grishechkin (Movie series «Secrets of Palace Coups», 2000—2008)
- Aleksandr Zbruyev («Balakirev the Buffoon», 2002)
- Valery Solovyov («Peter the Great: The Testament», 2011)
- Arseny Mironov («Chronautics», 2012)

== Sources ==
- Vasily Fursenko. Yagushinsky (Yaguzhinsky), Pavel Ivanovich // Russian Biographical Dictionary: in 25 volumes. – St. Petersburg – Moscow, 1896–1918.
