= Alexey Bestuzhev-Ryumin =

Russian diplomat and chancellor (1693–1766)

Count Alexey Bestuzhev-Ryumin
- Алексей Бестужев-Рюмин
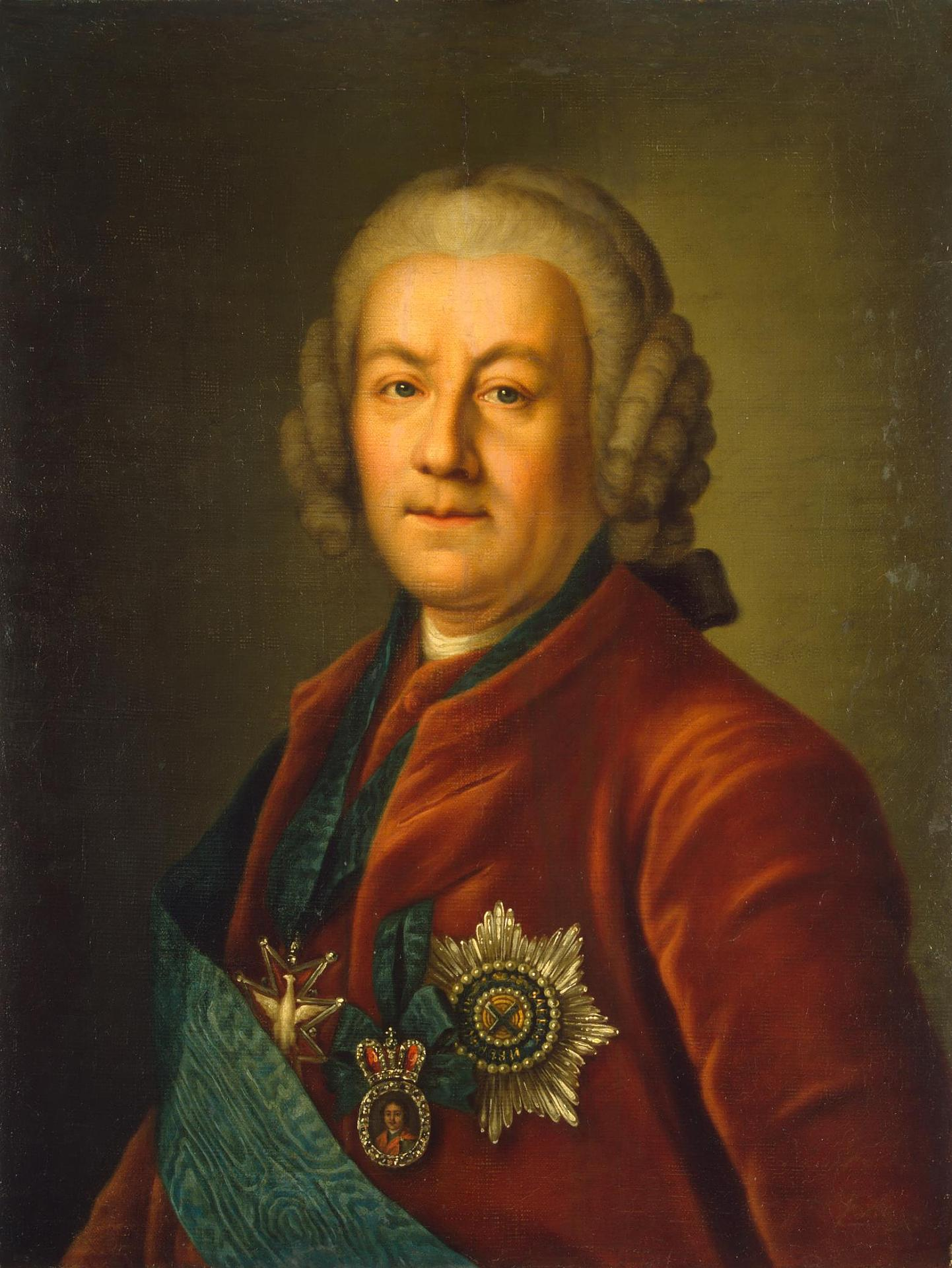
- Born: 1 June 1693; Moscow, Russia
- Died: 21 April 1766 (aged 72); Saint Petersburg, Russia
- Occupations: Statesman; Diplomat
- Spouse: Anna Ivanovna Bötticher
- Children: Andrey Alexeevich Bestuzhev-Ryumin
- Parents: Pyotr Mikhailovich Bestuzhev-Ryumin (father); Yevdokia Ivanovna Talyzina (mother)
- Relatives: Mikhail Petrovich Bestuzhev-Ryumin (brother)
- Honours: Order of St. Alexander Nevsky (1734); Order of St. Andrew (1741)

Chancellor of the Russian Empire
- In office 1744–1758
- Monarch: Elizabeth Petrovna
- Preceded by: Alexey Mikhailovich Cherkassky
- Succeeded by: Mikhail Illarionovich Vorontsov

President of the Collegium of Foreign Affairs
- In office 1742–1758
- Monarch: Elizabeth Petrovna
- Preceded by: Alexey Mikhailovich Cherkassky
- Succeeded by: Mikhail Illarionovich Vorontsov

Vice-Chancellor of the Russian Empire
- In office 1741–1744
- Monarch: Elizabeth Petrovna
- Preceded by: Mikhail Gavrilovich Golovkin
- Succeeded by: Mikhail Illarionovich Vorontsov

Cabinet Minister
- In office 29 August 1740 – 19 November 1740
- Monarchs: Anna Ioannovna; Ivan VI
- Preceded by: Artemy Petrovich Volynsky
- Succeeded by: Mikhail Gavrilovich Golovkin

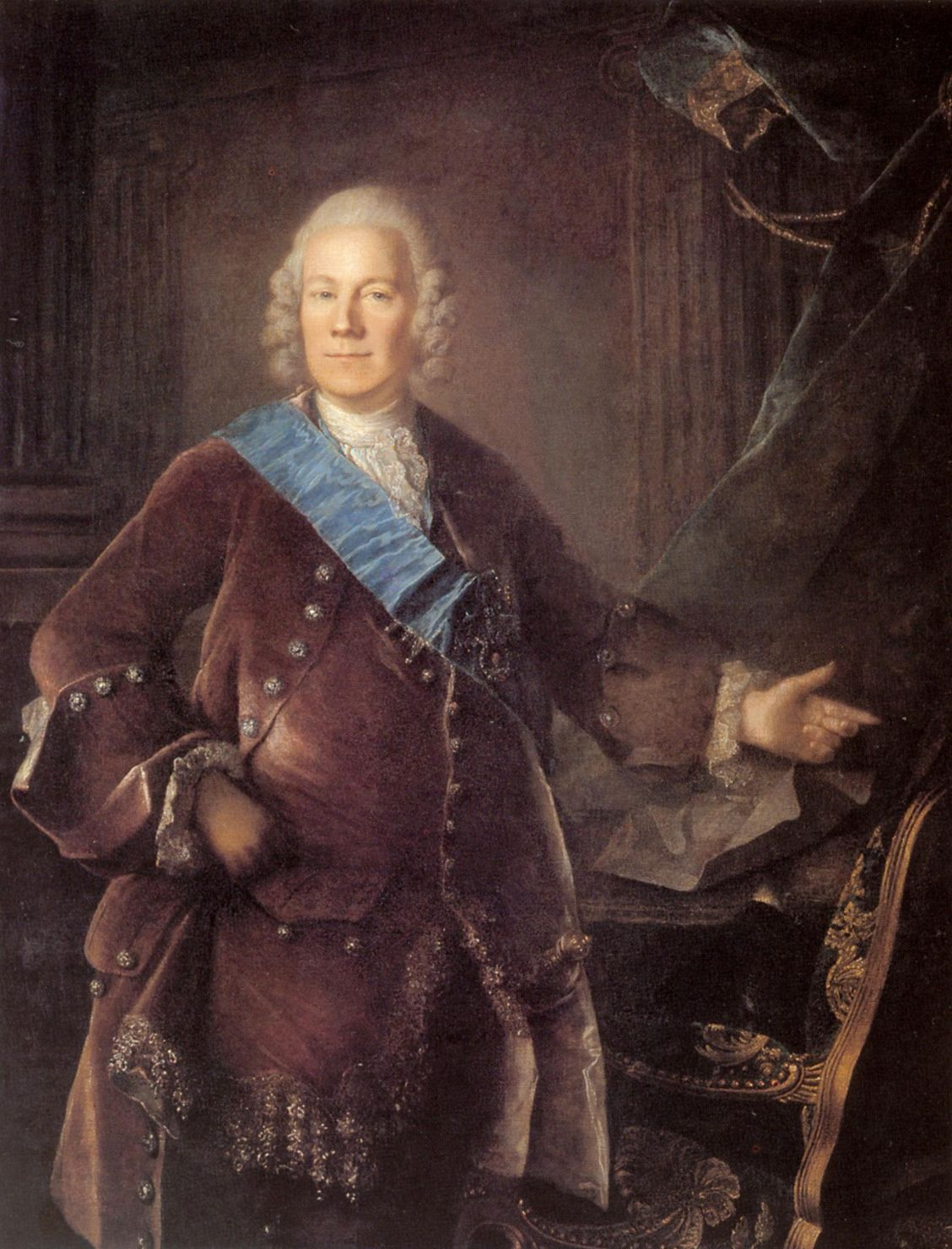
Portrait by Louis Tocqué

Count Alexey Petrovich Bestuzhev-Ryumin (Russian: Алексей Петрович Бестужев-Рюмин; 1 June 1693 – 21 April 1766) was a Russian diplomat and chancellor. He was one of the most influential and successful diplomats in 18th-century Europe. As the chancellor of the Russian Empire, was chiefly responsible for Russian foreign policy during the reign of Empress Elizaveta Petrovna.

== Early life and career ==
Alexey was born at Moscow to an old noble family of Novgorod descent. His father, Pyotr Bestuzhev-Ryumin, was Novgorod governor and a confidant of Empress Anna Ioannova. Later, he became the Russian ambassador to the duchy of Courland. Educated abroad with his elder brother, Mikhail, at Copenhagen and Berlin, Alexey especially distinguished himself in languages and the applied sciences.

In 1712, Peter the Great attached Bestuzhev to Prince Kurakin at the Utrecht Congress, that he might learn diplomacy and, for the same reason, permitted him in 1713 to enter the service of the elector of Hanover. The elector, who became King George I of Great Britain, took him to London in 1714 and sent him to Saint Petersburg as his accredited minister with a notification of his accession. Bestuzhev then returned to England, where he remained four years. That period laid the necessary groundwork for his brilliant diplomatic career.

Bestuzhev curiously illustrated his passion for intrigue in a letter to Tsarevich Alexey Petrovich at Vienna, assuring his "future sovereign" of his devotion and representing his sojourn in England as the deliberate seclusion of a zealous but powerless well wisher. That extraordinary indiscretion might well have cost him his life, but the tsarevich destroyed the letter. A copy of the letter, taken by way of precaution beforehand by the Austrian ministers, survived in the Vienna archives.

On his return to Russia, Bestuzhev served for two years without any salary as chief gentleman of the Bedchamber at the court of Anne of Courland. In 1721, he succeeded Vasily Dolgorukov as Russian minister at Copenhagen. The city then formed a nexus of diplomatic intrigue, as George I of Great Britain had the aim of arming the northern powers against Peter the Great, and Bestuzhev received the commission to counteract that.

On the occasion of the Treaty of Nystad (1721), which terminated the Great Northern War's 21 years of struggle between Russia and Sweden, Bestuzhev designed and had minted a commemorative medal with a panegyrical Latin inscription, which so delighted Peter, then at Derbent, that he sent a letter of thanks written in his own hand along with his portrait.

The sudden death of Peter the Great (8 February 1725) seriously injured Bestuzhev's prospects. For more than ten years, he remained at Copenhagen, looking vainly towards Russia as a sort of promised land from which he was excluded by enemies or rivals. He rendered some important services, however, to Empress Anne (reigned 1730–1740), who decorated him and made him a privy councillor. He also won the favour of Ernst von Biren, and on the tragic fall of Artemy Petrovich Volynsky in 1739, Bestuzhev returned to Russia to take Volynsky's place in the council. He assisted Biren to obtain the regency in the last days of Anne, but when his patron fell three weeks later (November 1740), his own position became precarious.

== Grand Chancellor of the Russian Empire ==
Bestuzhev's chance came when Empress Elizabeth, immediately after her accession (6 December 1741), summoned him back to court and appointed him vice-chancellor. For the next 20 years, during a period of exceptional difficulty, Bestuzhev practically controlled the foreign policy of Russia.

At the time, Bestuzhev judged France the natural enemy of Russia. The interests of the two states in the Ottoman Empire, Poland and Sweden were diametrically opposed, and Bestuzhev considered that Russia needed to fear the intrigues of France in all three countries, all of which bordered Russia. The enemies of France thus necessarily became the friends of Russia, and its friends were conversely viewed as Russia's enemies. Consequently, Great Britain and Austria became Russia's "natural" allies, and the aggressive and energetic King Frederick II of Prussia, then engaged in the Silesian Wars and allied with France in the War of the Austrian Succession, presented a danger to be guard. Bestuzhev therefore adopted the policy of bringing about a quadruple alliance of Russia, Austria, Britain and Saxony, to counteract the Franco-Prussian league. However, he stood on dangerous ground. Empress Elizabeth herself had an aversion to an alliance with Britain and with Austria, whose representatives had striven to prevent her accession. Many of her personal friends, in the pay of France and Prussia, took part in innumerable conspiracies to overthrow Bestuzhev. Despite those hindrances, Bestuzhev, aided by his elder brother, Mikhail, implemented his policy step by step.

Russia and Sweden had commenced hostilities in 1741. On 11 December 1742 Bestuzhev concluded a defensive alliance between Britain and Russia. He had previously rejected with scorn French proposals to mediate between Russia and Sweden on the basis of a territorial surrender on the part of the former. Bestuzhev conducted the war so vigorously that by the end of 1742, Sweden lay at the mercy of Russia. During the negotiations for the Treaty of Åbo (January to August 1743) Bestuzhev insisted for Sweden to cede the whole of Finland to Russia, thus completing the work of Peter the Great. However, the French contrived to get better terms for Sweden by artfully appealing to Empress Elizabeth's fondness for the House of Holstein. The Swedes, with the encouragement of Elizabeth, accepted Adolphus Frederick, Duke of Holstein, as their future king, and, in return, received Finland again, with the exception of a small strip of land up to the Kymmene River.

Bestuzhev could not prevent the signing of a Russo-Prussian defensive alliance in March 1743 but deprived it of all political significance by excluding the proposed guarantee of Frederick's conquests from the First Silesian War. Moreover Bestuzhev's efforts made the standing of the Prussian king, whom he regarded as even more dangerous than France, at the Russian court fell steadily, and the vice-chancellor prepared the way for an alliance with Austria by agreeing on 1 November 1743 to the Treaty of Breslau of 11 June 1742.

The bogus Lopukhina Conspiracy, however, put in place by the Holstein faction and aided by France and Prussia, persuaded Elizabeth that the Austrian ambassador had intrigued to restore Ivan VI to the throne and alienated her from Austria for a time. Bestuzhev's ruin appeared certain when, in 1743, a French agent, Jacques-Joachim Trotti, marquis de la Chétardie, arrived to reinforce his enemies. However, Bestuzhev found a friend in need in Mikhail Illarionovich Vorontsov, the empress's confidant, who shared his political views. Still, his position remained most delicate, especially when the betrothal between Grand-Duke Peter and Sophia of Anhalt-Zerbst (later Catherine II) took place against his will, and Elizabeth of Holstein, the mother of the bride, arrived to promote Prussian interests. Frederick II, conscious of the instability of his French ally, now keenly wished to contract an offensive alliance with Russia. The first step to realizing that plan required the overthrow of Bestuzhev, "upon whom", Frederick II wrote to his minister Axel von Mardefeld, "the fate of Prussia and my own house depends". However, Bestuzhev succeeded, at last, in convincing the empress of Chétardie's dangerous intrigues, and on 6 June 1744, Chétardie received orders to quit Russia within twenty-four hours. Five weeks later, Bestuzhev became grand chancellor (15 July 1744). Before the end of the year, Elizabeth of Holstein also was expelled from Russia, and Bestuzhev remained supreme.

== Anti-Prussian coalition ==
European diplomacy then focused on the king of Prussia, whose apparently insatiable acquisitiveness disturbed all his neighbours. Bestuzhev's offer, communicated to the British government at the end of 1745, to attack Prussia if Britain would guarantee subsidies to the amount of some £6,000,000, carried no weight now that Austria and Prussia had started coming to terms. Then, Bestuzhev turned to Austria and, on 22 May 1746, concluded an offensive and defensive alliance between both powers that was manifestly directed against Prussia. In 1747, he also signed alliances with Denmark and the Porte. At the same time, Bestuzhev resisted any rapprochement with France and severely rebuked the court of Saxony for its intrigues with the French court in Versailles.

He then felt hampered by the persistent opposition of the vice-chancellor Mikhail Vorontsov, formerly his friend but now his jealous rival, whom Frederick the Great secretly supported. In 1748, however, Bestuzhev was able to have Vorontsov removed by proving to the empress that Vorontsov had received money from Prussia.

The hour of Bestuzhev's triumph coincided with the peace congress of Aix-la-Chapelle (April to October 1748), which altered the whole situation of European politics and introduced fresh combinations, the breaking away of Prussia from France and a rapprochement between Britain and Prussia, with the inevitable corollary of an alliance between France and the enemies of Prussia.

Bestuzhev's strong political prejudices, at first, prevented him from properly recognising that change. Passion had always been too large an ingredient in his diplomacy. His Anglomania also misled him. His enemies, headed by his elder brother, Mikhail and the vice-chancellor Vorontsov, were powerless while his diplomacy seemed faultless but quickly took advantage of his mistakes. When the Anglo-Prussian and Franco-Austrian Alliances were formed in the first half of 1756, Vorontsov advocated the accession of Russia to the latter, but Bestuzhev insisted on a treaty with Britain. However, his influence had started to wane. The totally unexpected Anglo-Prussian alliance had justified the arguments of his enemies that Britain seemed impossible to deal with, while his hatred of France prevented him from adopting the only alternative of an alliance.

To counter the covert intrigues against him, Bestuzhev now proposed the erection of a council of ministers to settle all important affairs, and its first session (14–30 March 1756) proposed an alliance with Austria, France and Poland against Frederick II, but Bestuzhev opposed any arrangement with France. He endeavoured to counteract his failing influence by a secret alliance with Grand-Duchess Catherine, whom he proposed to raise to the throne instead of her Holstein husband, Peter, from whom Bestuzhev expected nothing good either for himself or for Russia. He conducted negotiations through Stanisław August Poniatowski and then the Russian ambassador of Saxony, later Stanisław II of Poland.

The inclusion of Russia in the anti-Prussian coalition (1756) in the Seven Years' War (1756–1763) occurred over Bestuzhev's head, and the cowardice and incapacity of his friend, the Russian commander-in-chief, Stepan Fyodorovich Apraksin, after winning the Battle of Gross-Jägersdorf (30 August 1757), became the pretext for overthrowing the chancellor. His unwillingness to agree to the coalition became magnified in opposition accounts into a determination to defeat it although his opponents never proved anything against him.

Nevertheless, he lost the chancellorship and suffered banishment to his estate at Goretovo (April 1759), where he remained until the accession of Catherine II (28 June 1762). Catherine recalled him to court and made him a field marshal. However, he took no leading part in affairs and died on 21 April 1766 in Saint Petersburg.

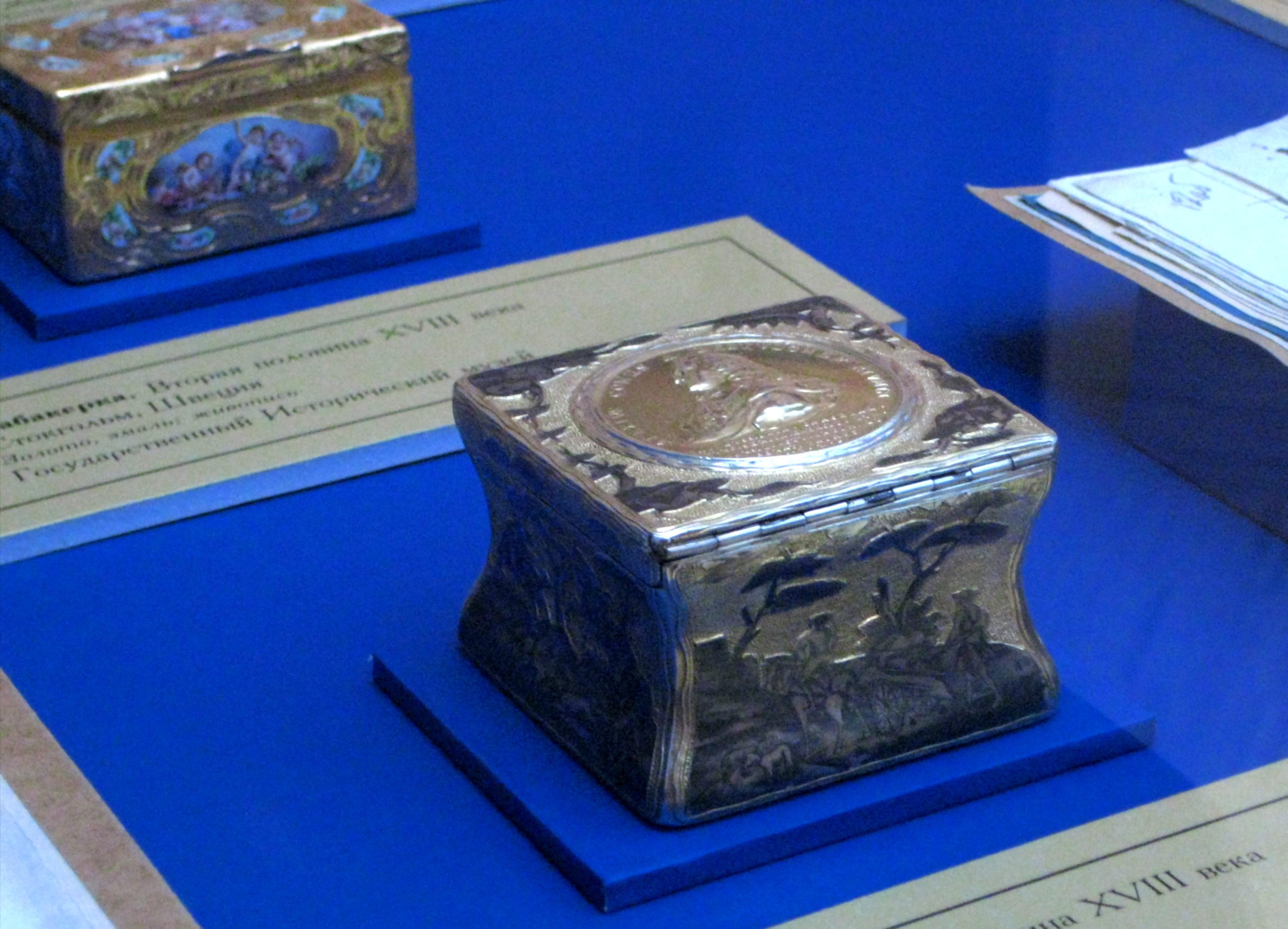
Bestuzhev's silver snuffbox with impressions of portrait medallions minted to his order.

== Sources ==
- Palmer Elena. Peter III. Der Prinz von Holstein. Sutton, Germany, 2005 ISBN 3-89702-788-7
- The Winter Palace by Eva Stachniak, chancellor and the teacher of spies to the main character.
- The Sbornik of the Russian Historical Society, vols. 1, 3, 5, 7, 12, 22, 26, 66, 79, 80, 81, 85-86, 91-92, 96, 99, 100, 103 (St Petersburg, 1870, &c.)
- Politische Correspondenz Friedrichs des Grossen, vols. 1–21 (Berlin, 1879–1904.)
- R. Nisbet Bain, The Daughter of Peter the Great (London, 1899).
- Emelina, M. (2007). "Алексей Петрович Бестужев-Рюмин" [Alexei Petrovich Bestuzhev-Riumin]. Вопросы истории (in Russian). 7: 29–45. ISSN 0042-8779.
- Kindinov, Mikhail (2015). ""Система Петра Великого": к вопросу о дипломатии канцлера А. П. Бестужева-Рюмина (1748—1756 гг.)" ["System of Peter the Great": on Chancellor A. P. Bestuzhev-Ryumin Diplomacy (1748—1756)] (PDF). Nauchny Dialog (in Russian). 8 (44). Gorno-Altaysk: 36–54.
- Anisimov, E. V. (2023). "БЕСТУЖЕВ-РЮМИН АЛЕКСЕЙ ПЕТРОВИЧ". Great Russian Encyclopedia. Electronic version.
