= Novocherkassk (disambiguation) =

Novocherkassk (Russian: Новочеркасск, lit. 'New Cherkassk') may refer to:

== Places ==
- Novocherkassk, Rostov, Russia; a city at the confluence of the Tuzlov and Aksay, the capital of the Novocherkassk Okrug
- Novocherkassk Urban Okrug, Rostov, Russia; an administrative division surrounding the city of Novocherkassk
- Novocherkassk Diocese, Don Archdiocese, Russia; of the Russian Orthodox Church

== Facilities and structures ==
- Novocherkassk Cathedral, Novocherkassk, Rostov, Russia
- Novocherkassk railway station, Novocherkassk, Rostov, Russia
- Military prison, Novocherkassk, Novocherkassk, Rostov, Russia

== Groups, organizations, companies ==
- FC MITOS Novocherkassk, a soccer club in Novocherkassk, Rostov, Russia
- Novocherkassk Boys' Gymnasium, a school in Novocherkassk, Rostov, Russia
- Novocherkassk Electric Locomotive Plant

== Other uses ==
- Russian landing ship Novocherkassk (BDK-46), a Ropucha-class landing ship of the Soviet Union built by Poland that passed into Russian service
- Soviet freighter Novocherkassk (B30/20), a B30-class (Sołdek-class) ore freighter; see SS Sołdek
- Novocherkassk massacre (1962), a massacre of civilians by the KGB in the city of Novocherkassk
- Novocherkassk Uprising (1962), a food revolt in the Soviet Union that lead to the massacre
- Novocherkassk culture (900–650 BC)

== See also ==
- Novocherkasskaya (Saint Petersburg Metro), Saint Petersburg, Saint Petersburg, Russia; a subway station
- Cherkassky
- Cherkassk
