= Collegium of Foreign Affairs =

Executive body in the Russian Empire

- Коллегия иностранных дел или иностранная коллегия Российской империи
- Coat of Arms of the Russian Empire

Ministry overview
- Formed: 1717
- Preceding Ministry: Posolsky prikaz
- Dissolved: 1832
- Superseding Ministry: Ministry of Foreign Affairs of the Russian Empire
- Jurisdiction: Emperor of Russia
- Headquarters: Saint Petersburg
- Ministry executive: Fyodor Golovin (first) Viktor Kochubey (last), President of Foreign Affairs
- Parent Ministry: Ministry of Foreign Affairs of the Russian Empire (1802-1832)

The Collegium of Foreign Affairs (Russian: Коллегия иностранных дел или иностранная коллегия Российской империи) was a collegium of the Russian Empire responsible for foreign policy from 1717 to 1832.

== Establishment ==
The Collegium of Foreign Affairs was created by Peter the Great as part of his government reforms to replace the existing posolsky prikaz, with Fyodor Golovin serving as its first president. It functioned as Russia's foreign ministry until it was replaced by the new Ministry of Foreign Affairs Although it continued to operate alongside the Ministry of Foreign Affairs of the Russian Empire, established in 1802 by Emperor Alexander I, its powers gradually diminished, and in 1832 it was completely abolished, with all of its functions transferred to the ministry.

The College of Foreign Affairs was governed by a board consisting of a president (chancellor), a vice president (vice chancellor), and other members. Important decisions were made through voting within this board.

== List of Presidents ==
No.	Name	Term of office		Reigning monarch
No.	Name	Began	Ended	Reigning monarch
College of Foreign Affairs
16	Gavriil Golovkin	1717	1734	Peter I, Catherine I, Peter II, Anna Ioannovna
17	Andrey Osterman	1734	1740	Anna Ioannovna
18	Alexey Cherkassky	1741	1742	Ivan VI
19	Aleksey Bestuzhev-Ryumin	1742	1758	Elizabeth Petrovna
20	Mikhail Vorontsov	1758	1763	Elizabeth Petrovna, Peter III
21	Nikita Panin	1763	1781	Catherine II
22	Ivan Osterman	1783	1797	Catherine II, Paul I
23	Alexander Bezborodko	1797	1799	Paul I
24	Fyodor Rostopchin	1799	1801	Paul I
25	Alexander Kurakin	1801	1802	Alexander I
