= Cabinet of Ministers of the Russian Empire =

- Кабинет министров
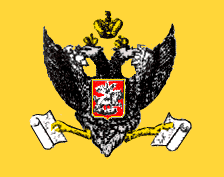

Agency overview
- Formed: November 4, 1731
- Preceding agency: Supreme Privy Council
- Dissolved: December 23, 1741
- Superseding agency: Conference at the Highest Court
- Jurisdiction: Russian Empire
- Headquarters: Saint Petersburg
- Agency executive: Empress of All Russia

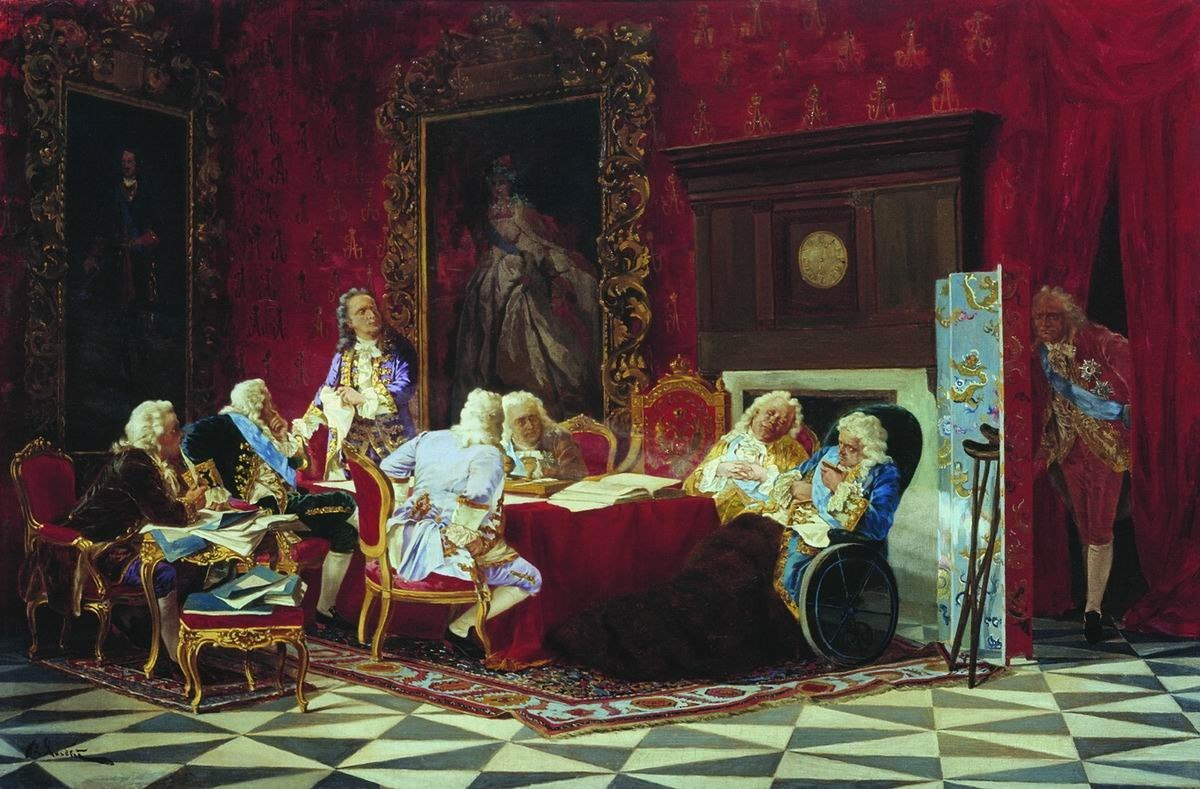
"Artemy Volynsky at a cabinet meeting", painting by Valery Jacobi

The Cabinet of Ministers was the supreme state body established on November 4, 1731, by the decree of Empress Anna Ioannovna. On December 23, 1741, after the accession of Elizabeth Petrovna, it lost its powers and was transformed into the Personal Office of the Empress. In 1756, its functions were transferred to the Conference at the Highest Court.

== History ==
Having come to power in 1730, Anna Ioannovna, instead of the Supreme Privy Council, restored the Senate. Shortly after the abolition of the Privy Council, Anna Ioannovna, by a decree of November 17, 1731, established the Cabinet of Ministers.

Even so, for the best and most honorable administration of all state affairs to our own all-gracious decision of the subject, and for the benefit of the state and our loyal subjects, we wanted to establish at the court of our Cabinet, and determine from the ministers of our Chancellor Count Golovkin, Vice-Chancellor Ostermann, Actual Privy Councilor of Prince Cherkassky, moreover, for the sake of this, we declare it the most gracious.

— Decree of Empress Anna Ioannovna "On the establishment of the Cabinet of Ministers" dated November 6, 1731

In 1735 a decree was issued, which the signature of the three cabinet ministers equated to the Imperial signature.

During the reign of Anna Leopoldovna, under the influence of Minich, the Cabinet was divided into 3 departments:

- Count Burkhard von Münnich, in the rank of First Minister, was in charge of the army, cadet corps and affairs on the Ladoga Canal;
- Count Andrey Osterman — external relations and fleet;
- Prince Alexey Cherkassky and Count Mikhail Golovkin were provided with "everything that relates to the interior of the Senate and the Synod, and state fees for the chamber board and other incomes, commerce, justice and other things to which they belong".

Separate cabinet ministers, in charge of their departments, single-handedly decided matters in them, communicating only "for coordination" their opinion to other ministers. Only particularly important matters should be decided by the general council. In its new form, the Cabinet did not exist for long: following the accession of Elizaveta Petrovna to the Throne, it was abolished by a decree: "On the restoration of the internal state bodies; on the composition of the register, the decree of the former kingdoms, which the use of the State is repugnant of; the destruction of the former Cabinet, and the installation of the new at the Court of Her Imperial Majesty; the establishment in the Governorate Prosecutor, the scope of which is defined for management by the foreign staff of the Chancellor" of December 23, 1741.

== Composition ==
The Cabinet consisted of three cabinet ministers (of two — from April 17, 1736, to February 14, 1738, from April 23, 1740, to August 29, 1740, after December 6, 1741, and of the four from November 1741 to March 14, 1741). It constantly included Andrey Osterman and Alexey Cherkassky, and also, replacing each other, Gavriil Golovkin, Pavel Yaguzhinsky, Artemy Volynsky, Alexey Bestuzhev-Ryumin, Mikhail Golovkin and Burkhard von Münnich (the last — the fourth cabinet minister).

Cabinet Ministers alphabetically:

- Alexey Bestuzhev-Ryumin — from August 29, 1740, to November 19, 1740 (arrested);
- Artemy Volynsky — from February 14, 1738, to April 23, 1740 (arrested);
- Gavriil Golovkin — from November 21, 1731, to January 31, 1734;
- Mikhail Golovkin — soon after November 19, 1740, to December 6, 1741 (arrested);
- Burkhard von Münnich — from shortly after November 19, 1740, to March 14, 1741;
- Andrey Osterman — from November 21, 1731, to December 23, 1741;
- Alexey Cherkassky — from November 21, 1731, to December 23, 1741;
- Pavel Yaguzhinsky — from January 31, 1734, to April 17, 1736 (died in the post of cabinet minister).

== Sources ==
- Cabinet of Ministers of the Russian Empire
- Solovyov, Vladimir (2000). New Popular Encyclopedia. History of Russia. AST-press.
