= Yaguzhinsky =

Yaguzhinsky is a surname. Notable people with the surname include:

- Pavel Yaguzhinsky (1683–1736), Russian statesman and diploma
- Sergey Yaguzhinsky (1731–1806), Russian Chamberlain
