= Sergey Yaguzhinsky =

Sergey Pavlovich Yaguzhinsky
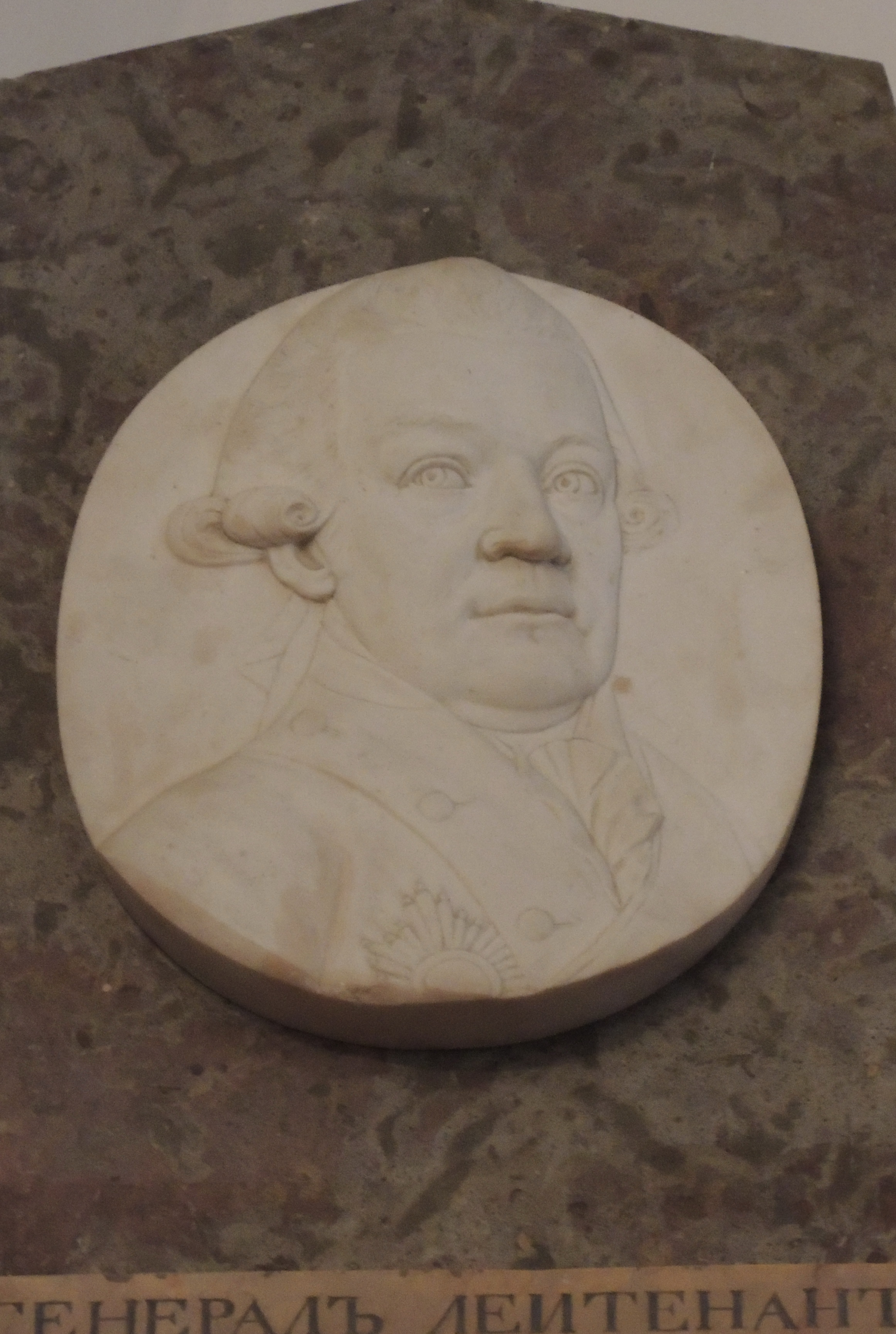
- Portrait on a marble tombstone of Sergey Yaguzhinsky
- Born: 25 April 1731
- Died: 22 February 1806 (aged 74)
- Citizenship: Russian Empire
- Spouses: Anastasia Shuvalova; Varvara Saltykova
- Parents: Pavel Yaguzhinsky (father); Anna Bestuzheva–Ryumina (mother)
- Awards: Order of Saint Anna

Count Sergey Pavlovich Yaguzhinsky (Yagushinsky) (Russian: Сергей Павлович Ягужинский; 22 April 1731 – 22 February 1806) was a Chamberlain, lieutenant general (1764), owner of the Sylvinsky and Utkinsky factories, as well as a cloth factory in Pavlovskaya Sloboda. The second and last Count Yaguzhinsky.

He was an incompetent, dissolute and wasteful person. Having frivolously spent his fortune and his wives (he was married twice), <...> fell into extreme need and was taken into trusteeship.

— Russian Biographical Dictionary

== Early years ==
The only son of Prosecutor General Pavel Yaguzhinsky and his wife Anna Gavrilovna, daughter of Chancellor Gavriil Golovkin. At the age of 5, he lost his father, after another 7 years, his mother was exiled to Siberia in the Lopukhin Case (with confiscation of property).

The stepfather of the young count Mikhail Bestuzhev, being a diplomat, was constantly abroad. After the reprisal of his mother, Yaguzhinsky was sent on a Grand Tour of Europe under the assumed name "Pavlov". During his stay in Vienna, the Russian envoy Ludovik Lanchinsky found educators for a "capable and sufficient person", and Empress Elizaveta Petrovna allocated a pension of 1,500 rubles for his maintenance, later increased to 3,500 rubles.

"Yaguzhinsky is humble and constant, and studies very diligently from morning to evening, why is it necessary for him to have rest", Lanchinsky reported to Saint Petersburg. Due to the meager maintenance, the young nobleman had to save on everything. "In Yaguzhinsky's wardrobe there was only one full set of outfit (hat, caftan, camisole, culottes, stockings, a pair of shoes and a sword). We rented an apartment for 65 guilders a month and one and a half guilders per person for lunch and dinner every day". In August 1750, Yaguzhinsky expressed a desire to return to Russia, about which he wrote to the Empress:

When I was here, I studied German and French with all diligence... geography, history, various exercises and mathematics. <...> I beg you most mercifully to order me to return to my fatherland and there to determine me, where Your Imperial Majesty deign to please yourself.

In 1753, he returned from abroad and received in September 1754 the court rank of Chamber Junker. The Empress chose Anastasia Ivanovna, the sister of her favorite Ivan Shuvalov, as his bride. On the occasion of the marriage, some of the confiscated estates of his father were returned to the groom, namely, a house on Vasilyevsky Island "along the canal" and on the Moika opposite the Summer Garden, two summer cottages along the Peterhof Road, in Moscow a stone house on Znamenka and two wooden houses.

Shuvalov, the favorite, tried to get his son–in–law into the diplomatic service, but to no avail. Soon after the wedding, Yaguzhinsky went on a diplomatic mission to Stockholm. This was the end of his official career. Since 1757, he was a chamberlain at the imperial court, where he invariably took part in court entertainments.

== Litigation with the treasury ==
The idle Count Yaguzhinsky decided to follow in the footsteps of the Demidovs and Stroganovs, who had fabulously enriched themselves in mining: having received, following the example of his relatives Shuvalovs and Vice–Chancellor Vorontsov, the Ural factories from the treasury, become a mining industrialist or, in case of failure of this enterprise, resell them to the side. He took a five–year loan from the Treasury on very favorable terms: he received "in debt, at interest and on bail 6,800 souls of peasants, 150,000 rubles for the establishment of a silk hosiery factory, and also secured the transfer of two ironworks in the Urals to him for 72,268 rubles".

The capitalist from the count did not work. Driving through the Urals in 1760, Semyon Vorontsov noted that mismanagement reigned at Yaguzhinsky's factories, production was actually stopped. In 1764, Catherine II conducted an audit and counted 230,651 rubles of debt to the unlucky breeder. Yaguzhinsky, in response, demanded lost profits for the village of Korostino confiscated from his mother (a total of 73,525 rubles), as well as 114,272 rubles taken during «"his mother's misfortune", including 25,000 of her dowry, and interest on them, and interest on of this interest, for the time that the treasury used this money, a total of 162,080 rubles». He also pointed out that he spent 60,000 on the development of state–owned factories, and demanded, if not compensation for these costs, then at least the return of the "box" with jewelry taken from his mother, not counting 66 items of silver utensils.

Since Sergey Yaguzhinsky was not able to pay the arrears, trusteeship was established over his estates. However, the bankruptcy was handled as gently as possible, which set a significant precedent for other extravagant courtiers. Although the German Miller, who kept a stocking factory, filed a complaint that the count was withholding his belongings in the amount of 17,180 rubles, the empress was not interested in a conflict with the higher nobility. The matter was hushed up. "Count Yaguzhinsky has just achieved everything he wanted from the crown; he was given all the sums that he owed the crown, and were given more than 15,000 silver rubles, including one estate of 1,500 peasants", Pyotr Bakunin reported to Anna Stroganova in February 1764.

== After bankruptcy ==
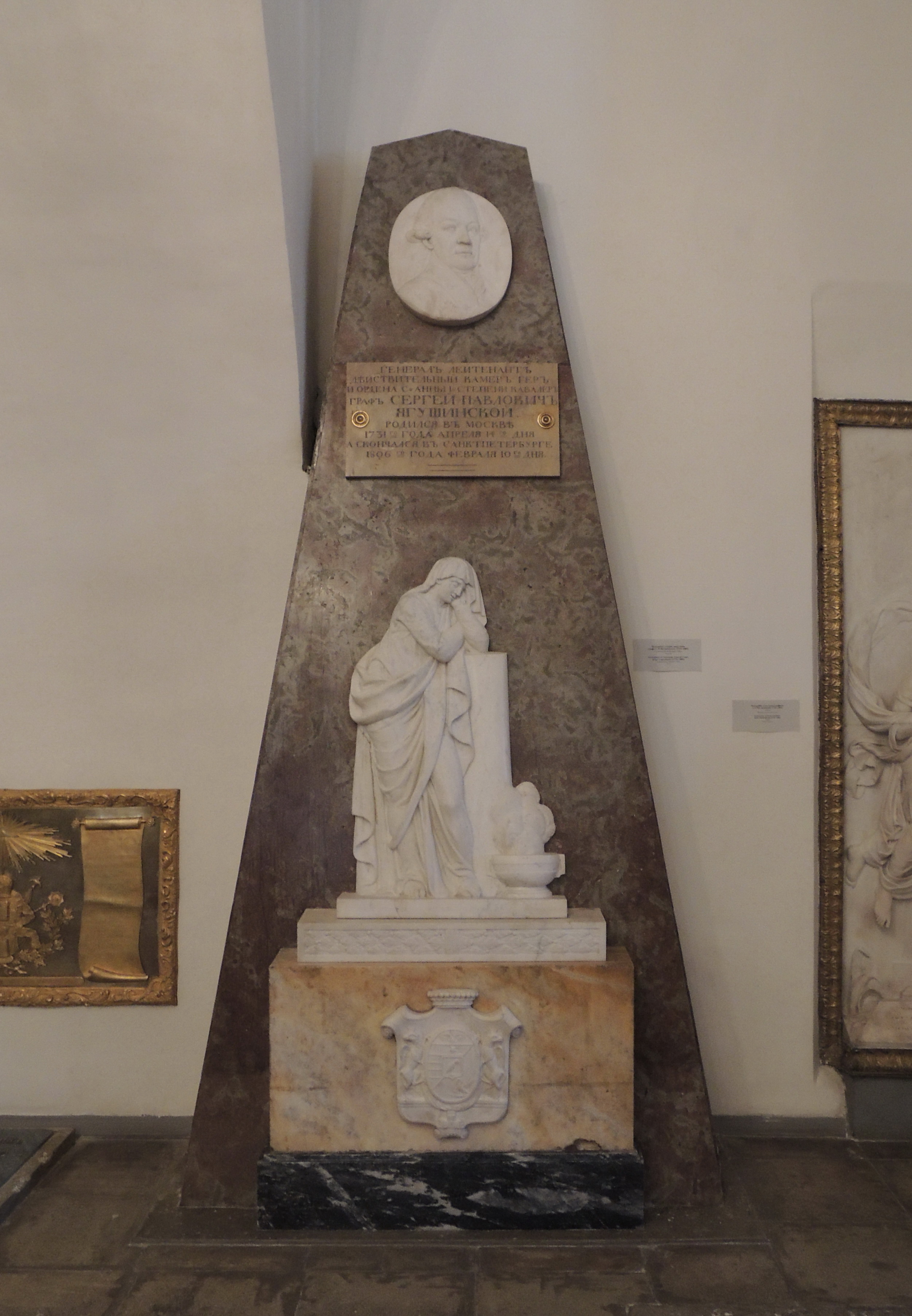
Gravestone of Sergei Yaguzhinsky

Unpaid debts did not slow down the industrial undertakings of the count–manufacturer. In the same 1764, Yaguzhinsky instructed the German Lilienstal to organize sawmills at the Ostrov manor near Saint Petersburg. This contract was not executed and only gave rise to a new wave of mutual claims. The count tried to pay off his debts by robbing his own peasants to the bone. For this purpose, the clerk Devals was hired, whose appearance on the estates was often accompanied by peasant unrest. The only serf memoirist in the 18th century, Leonty Travin, wrote about Devals:

It was quite well known that in Moscow, in the Pavlovian Estate, he tyrannized and ruined many to the end, and tortured others, keeping them in custody in the cellar; this foreshadowed us a general calamity.

At the same time, it is known that Yaguzhinsky paid for the education of the serf musician Mikhail Matinsky, one of the first Russian composers, at his own expense.

In 1777, the Empress ordered to redeem the debts of Count Yaguzhinsky and the estates he had pledged to the treasury, in order to then transfer them into the hands of her favorite Grigory Potemkin. In 1778, the millionaire Savva Yakovlev became the owner of the Utkinsky Plant. However, the debt epic cost Yaguzhinsky family happiness. His wife left her husband's house in the autumn of 1767 in order to protect her own dowry and the funds that Yaguzhinsky borrowed from her relatives from confiscation.

Yaguzhinsky was granted the rank of Lieutenant General and the Order of Saint Anna.

In recent years, Count Yaguzhinsky lived in his own house on the Field of Mars, 5 with his second wife Varvara Saltykova (1749–1843), heiress of the village of Safarino on Troitskaya Road. In the Church of the Annunciation of the Alexander Nevsky Lavra, a wall tombstone with a portrait bas–relief depicting the last Count Yaguzhinsky has been preserved. Connoisseurs attribute this work to Fedot Shubin or Theodosius Shchedrin.

The widow of Count Yaguzhinsky survived him by many years and died at the age of ninety–four. Contemporaries considered her a narrow–minded woman and blamed her for burning her father–in–law's most valuable archive for history. While working on historical writings, Pushkin, having learned that the daughter–in–law of one of Peter's associates still lives near Moscow, sought to get to know her. Countess Yaguzhinskaya let him know that she "does not share society with rhymers and scribes":

He will print what I could tell him, and God knows what might come of it. My poor mother–in–law died in Siberia, with her tongue cut out, whipped. And I want to die in peace in my bed in Saforin.
