= Mikhail Golovkin =

Russian diplomat (1699 - 1754)

Mikhail Gavrilovich Golovkin
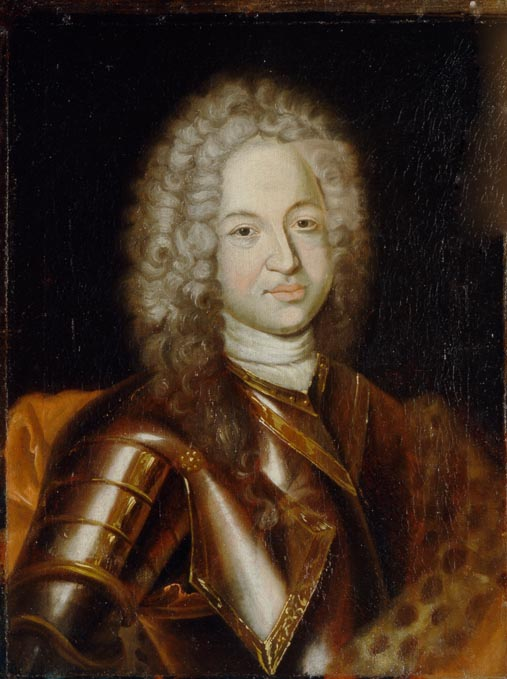
- Born: 1699
- Died: 1754 (aged 54–55)
- Occupations: Diplomat, politician
- Spouse: Ekaterina Golovkina
- Father: Gavriil Golovkin
- Awards: Order of the Holy Apostle Andrew the First–Called

Count Mikhail Gavrilovich Golovkin (Russian: Михаи́л Гаври́лович Голо́вкин; 1699 – 1754, Yarmong in Kolyma) was a Russian diplomat, the Chancellor's son, married to the cousin of Empress Anna Ioannovna. He was Vice–Chancellor, Head of the Monetary Office, a Cabinet Minister in 1740–1741, then in exile until the end of his life.

== Life at court ==
In 1712, he was sent abroad for training. Ten years later, he served as ambassador at the Prussian court in Berlin. Under Anna Ioannovna he was a senator and supervised the Mint and the Chancellery. "The favorite of his father, very handsome and well–mannered, Mikhail had a quick and brilliant success", Fyodor Golovkin recalled of his uncle. However, after the death of his father, he did not get into the Cabinet of Ministers, which made him very offended and caused him to withdraw from running affairs.

Under Anna Leopoldovna he was Vice–Chancellor for Internal Affairs, one of the most powerful people in the state. He had conflicts with Burkhard Christoph von Münnich and Andrey Osterman, during the overthrow of Ernst Johann von Biron, he said he was sick, so as not to appear in the palace. He enjoyed the great confidence of the ruler and advised her to declare herself empress, and to cloister Elizaveta Petrovna in a monastery immediately after her coronation. According to Fyodor Golovkin

He outlined his project in writing and sent it with a confidant, a certain Grunstein, to the palace. But this man was bribed and began by giving the package to Elizabeth, who, having read and sealed it carefully again, sent it to the ruler.

== Life in Siberia ==
While Anna Leopoldovna was celebrating her daughter's name day in Saint Petersburg, the conspirators decided to act and on the night of November 24–25, 1741, Golovkin was arrested. Put on trial, he was found guilty of treason and sentenced to death. Elizaveta Petrovna replaced Golovkin's death sentence with eternal exile to Hermang (aka Yarmong). His wife, Ekaterina Ivanovna, was acquitted and allowed to live where she wanted, but chose exile with her husband.

All of the property of the Golovkins was confiscated and distributed by the favorite of the new empress. "Both spouses were deprived to such an extent that old Chernyshev, the father of three sons who later became famous, with difficulty and risking his own freedom, saw that they were given a sheepskin coat and twenty–two rubles in money". The exiles were accompanied to Irkutsk by officer Maxim Berg.

Former Count Golovkin spent about 13 years in exile. He had the right to leave the house only if accompanied by two armed soldiers. Every Sunday he appeared at the parish church. Once a year, he was obliged to listen to "some paper, and after it the exhortation of the priest".

Mikhail Gavrilovich died in 1754. Pavel Karabanov claimed that Golovkin was strangled by his own servants, who were tired of moldering at the end of the world. His wife buried him in the vestibule of the house in which they lived, turning it into a chapel. A year later, she was allowed to return to Moscow. Ekaterina Ivanovna brought her husband's body with her and buried it in the Saint George Monastery.

Mistress Golovkina often told me later how they first ate wild roots and little–known drugs that were delivered to them by shamans, or priests of aliens wandering in these vast and desert countries; her husband died soon after, but with the help of her devoted servants, she managed to embalm his corpse and keep it in the dugout they dug.

== Assessments ==
Kazimir Valishevsky characterizes Golovkin Junior as "a complete nonentity ... who could be bought for fifty thousand". At the same time, according to the characteristics of Mikhail Pylyaev

Count Mikhail Golovkin was a true patriot and a skillful minister, he hated Biron and Osterman, had a good education, was distinguished by his directness, kind heart and great hospitality, but he loved to indulge in laziness and bliss and sometimes was not alien to pride, stubbornness, perseverance and anger.
