= Cherkassky =

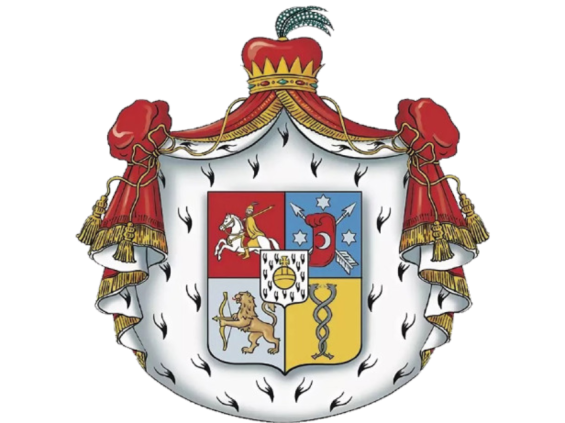
Coat of arms of the Princes Cherkassky

The House of Cherkassky (Russian: Черкасский) is an old Russian princely family, part the Russian nobility, whose members once bore the title of Knyaz in the Russian Empire.

== Notable members ==
- Mikhail Cherkassky (died 1571), Russian voyevoda and notable oprichnik
- Yakov Cherkassky (died 1666), Russian statesman and military figure
- Prince Alexander Bekovich-Cherkassky (died 1717), Russian officer who led the first Russian military expedition into Central Asia
- Alexey Cherkassky (1680–1742), Russian statesman
- Maria Cherkassky (1696–1747), lady-in-waiting from the Russian Empire, Trubetskoy family and House of Cherkasskiy
- Vladimir Cherkassky (1821–1878), Russian public figure
- Ekaterina Cherkassky (Vasilchikova) (1825–1888), House of Vasilchikov and House of Cherkasskiy
- Maria Nikolaevna Cherkassky (died 1892), House of Tcherbatov and House of Cherkasskiy
- Abram Cherkassky (1886–1967), Ukrainian/Soviet painter
- Shura Cherkassky (1909–1995), Russian-born American classical pianist

== See also ==
- Novocherkasskaya
- Novocherkassk (disambiguation)
- Cherkassk
