= Chancellor (Russia) =

Highest civil rank in the Russian Empire

Chancellor of the Russian Empire (Russian: канцлер Российской империи, romanized: kantsler Rossiyskoy imperii) was the highest civil rank (1st class) in the Russian Empire under the Table of Ranks, instituted by Peter the Great on 4 February [O.S. 24 January] 1722. It was equal in status to General Field Marshal in the Army and General Admiral in the Navy. A holder of the rank was addressed as Your High Excellency (Russian: Ваше Высокопревосходительство, Vashe Vysokoprevoskhoditelstvo).

== Overview ==
The rank was usually granted to foreign ministers (the President of the Collegium of Foreign Affairs or, after 1802, the Minister of Foreign Affairs). If the official in charge held a 2nd-class rank, he served as Vice-Chancellor.

As a rule, only one person held the rank at a time. The only exception was Count Ivan Osterman, who resigned from office in 1797 but was permitted to retain his rank until his death in 1811, overlapping with three subsequent chancellors. Because the rank was awarded sparingly, other senior officials in the 1st class were typically appointed as Active Privy Councillor, 1st class.

In total, twelve men held the title of Chancellor in Russia: Fyodor Golovin was styled Chancellor in the Tsardom of Russia (1699–1706) prior to the formal establishment of the rank, and eleven held the official rank in the Russian Empire (beginning with Gavriil Golovkin, who was created State Chancellor in 1709). The last holder was Prince Alexander Gorchakov, appointed in 1867. After Gorchakov died in 1883, no further appointments were made, though the rank was not formally abolished until the Decree on the Abolition of Estates and Civil Ranks on 23 November [O.S. 10 November] 1917.

== List of chancellors ==
Twelve statesmen held the title or rank of Chancellor in Russia:

- 1699–1706: Count Fyodor Alexeyevich Golovin (1650–1706) (styled Chancellor in the Tsardom of Russia)
- 1709–1734: Count Gavriil Ivanovich Golovkin (1660–1734) (first formal State Chancellor from 1709; under the Empire from 1721)
- 1740–1742: Prince Alexey Cherkassky (1680–1742)
- 1744–1758: Count Alexey Bestuzhev-Ryumin (1693–1766), stripped of rank in 1758, restored in 1762 as Field Marshal
- 1758–1765: Count Mikhail Illarionovich Vorontsov (1714–1767)
- 1796–1797: Count Ivan Andreyevich Osterman (1725–1811), retired in 1797 while retaining the rank until death
- 1797–1799: Prince Alexander Bezborodko (1747–1799)
- 1802–1805: Count Alexander Vorontsov (1741–1805)
- 1809–1826: Count Nikolay Rumyantsev (1754–1826)
- 1834: Prince Viktor Kochubey (1768–1834)
- 1844–1862: Count Karl Nesselrode (1780–1862)
- 1867–1883: Prince Alexander Gorchakov (1798–1883)

== See also ==
- Chancellor of Austria
- Chancellor of Germany
- Chancellor of Norway
- Chancellor of Poland
- List of chancellors of Germany
- Lord Chancellor
