= Maria Cherkassky =

Russian noblewoman and Imperial courtier

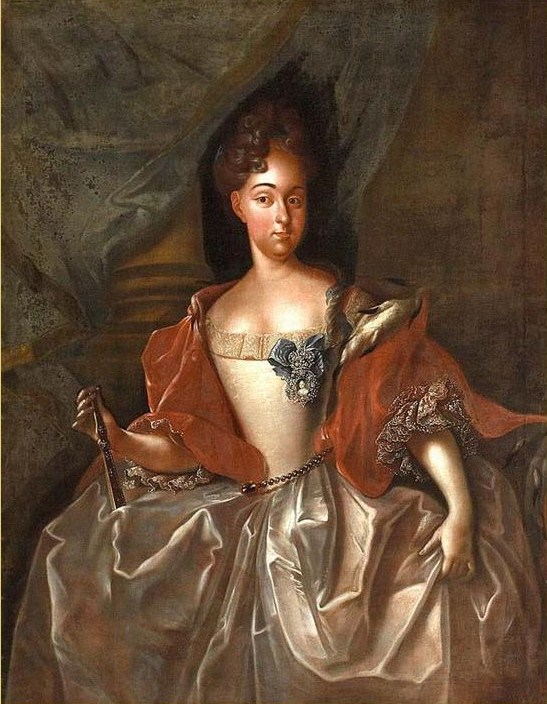
Maria Cherkassky

Princess Maria Yuryevna Cherkassky née Trubetskaya (Russian: Мария Юрьевна Трубецкая; 1696–1747), was a Russian noblewoman and an Imperial courtier.

== Biography ==
She was the daughter of Prince Yuri Yuryevich Trubetskoy and his wife, Princess Elena Cherkasskaya, and older sister of Nikita Trubetskoy. She married Prince Alexey Cherkassky in 1710.

She served as a lady-in-waiting to empress Anna of Russia. She played a major role in the preservation of absolute monarchy at the time of Anna's accession in 1730. She and countess Chernysheva was assigned by the monarchist party at court to persuade the new empress to opposed the suggestion to abolish the absolute monarchy. She and Chernysheva succeeded with their task.

Princess Cherkassky was described by contemporaries:

”... uncommonly beautiful and with many excellent jewels. She lived in richer in St Petersburg then anyone, she had her own musical orchestra, composed of ten quite good musicians, a German coock who prepared German cuisine for her table, and the absence of her husband, the Governor of Siberia, an elder man, did not bother her much."

She played an important role in the court and high society during the reign of Anna of Russia (r. 1730–1740), and her influence as a personal friend of the empress resulted in her being courted with expensive gifta by foreign diplomats and ambassadors.

Empress Elizabeth of Russia appointed her lady-in-waiting upon her accession in 1741.
