= Mikhail Petrovich Bestuzhev-Ryumin =

Russian diplomat (1688–1760)

Count Mikhail Petrovich Bestuzhev-Ryumin
- Михаи́л Петро́вич Бесту́жев-Рю́мин
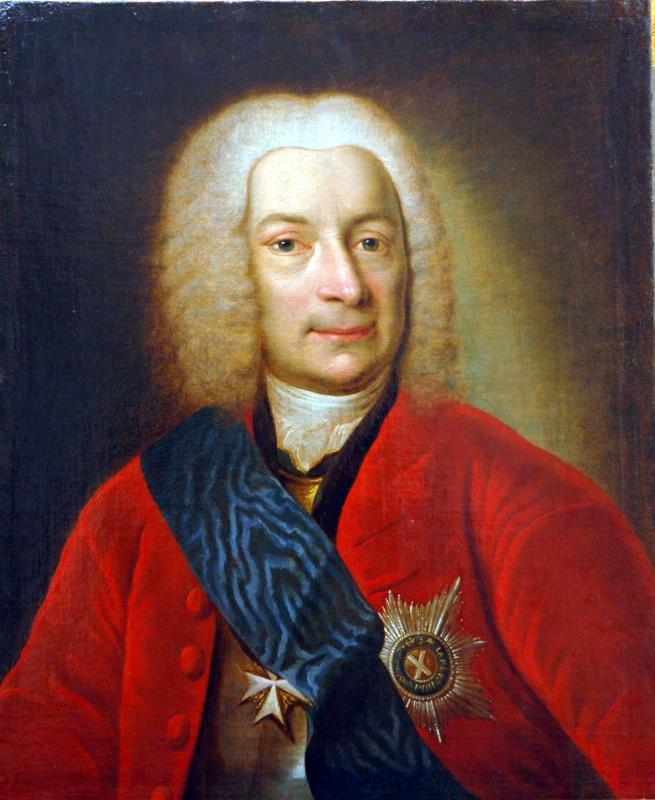
- Born: 1688; Moscow, Tsardom of Russia
- Died: 1760 (aged 71–72); Paris, Kingdom of France
- Occupation: Diplomat
- Spouse: Anna Bestuzheva (1743–1760)
- Father: Pyotr Bestuzhev-Ryumin
- Relatives: Aleksey Bestuzhev (brother)

Mikhail Petrovich Bestuzhev-Ryumin (Михаи́л Петро́вич Бесту́жев-Рю́мин; 1688 in Moscow – 1760 in Paris) was a Russian diplomat. He was the son of Pyotr Bestuzhev-Ryumin and elder brother of the more famous Aleksey Bestuzhev.

Mikhail Bestuzhev was brought up with his brother in Berlin. In 1705, Peter the Great commanded him to join the Russian embassy in Copenhagen. Fifteen years later, he became the Russian resident in England, which later entered an alliance with Sweden. As the Great Northern War between Russia and Sweden was still going on, Bestuzhev attempted to interfere and was ordered by the English government to leave the country.

He then settled in the Hague, until the Treaty of Nystad concluded the war in 1721. Thereupon he was appointed Minister Plenipotentiary in Stockholm, a position which he filled with notable success. During his tenure, Sweden recognized Russia as an empire and concluded a defensive alliance with her for 12 years. Catherine I of Russia, however, ordered him to move to Warsaw in 1726, while Empress Anna removed him to Berlin before having him returned to Stockholm in 1732. Although the alliance with Sweden was prolonged, Bestuzhev was exposed to street violence more than once and was briefly taken into custody when the new Russo-Swedish War erupted in 1741.

Upon his release, Bestuzhev proceeded to Hanover to confer with George II of Great Britain. At this time, Empress Elizabeth usurped the throne and appointed Bestuzhev her agent in Warsaw. In 1743, he married Golovkin's daughter Anna, who was involved in the Lopukhina affair.

During the investigation of his wife's behaviour, Bestuzhev was held under house arrest. When he was finally allowed to go abroad, his powerful brother procured for him a series of lucrative appointments. He successively served as the Russian ambassador in Berlin, Warsaw, Vienna, and Paris, where he died.
