= Military prison, Novocherkassk =

Building in Novocherkassk, Russia

Coordinates: 47.412598°N 40.104705°E

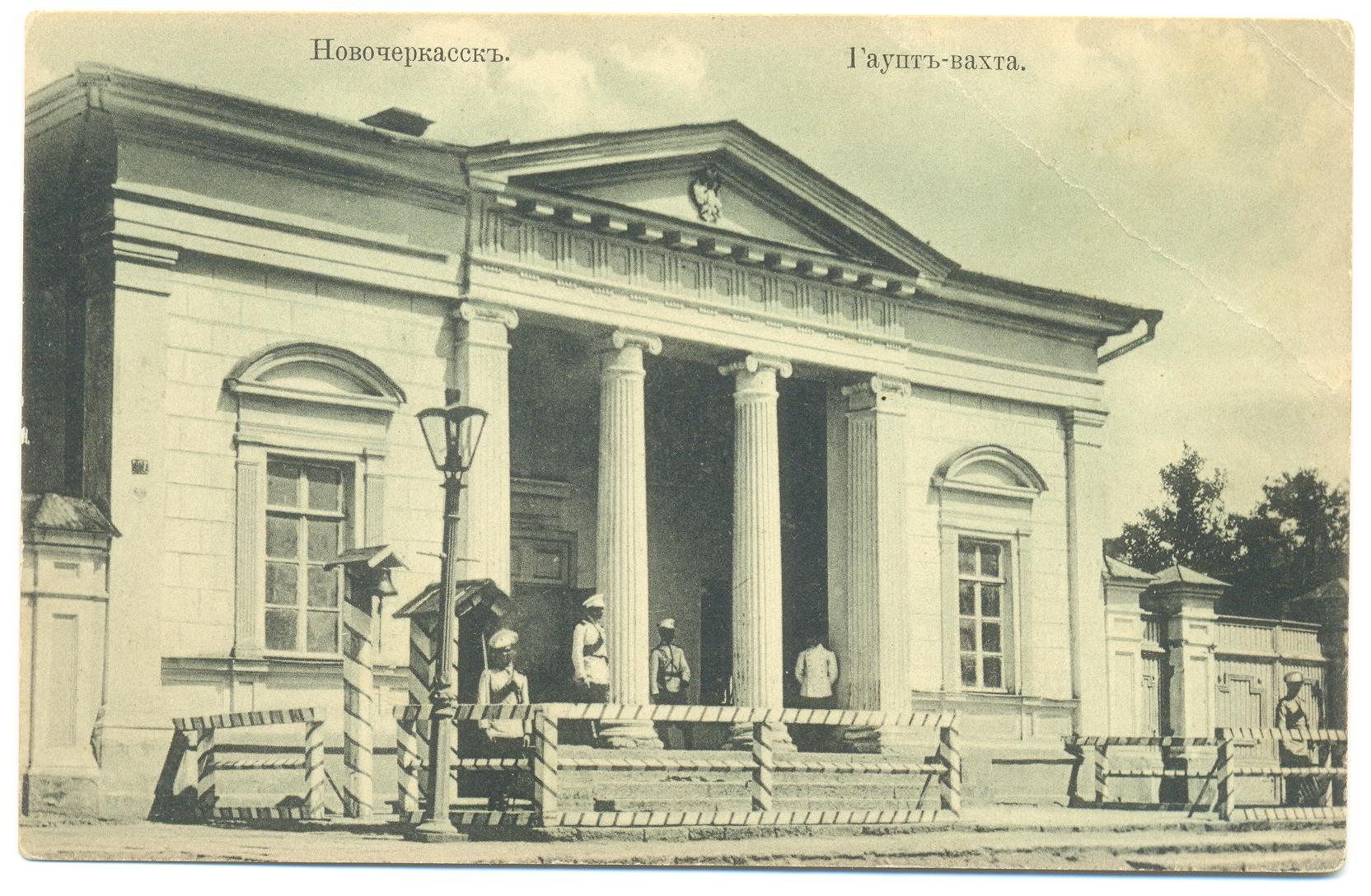
The military prison in the 1900s

The Military prison building (Russian: Здание гауптвахты, romanized: Zdaniye gauptvakhty) is the former guardhouse of the Imperial Russian Army in Novocherkassk, Rostov oblast, Russia and the current military commandant's headquarters of the city. The building, which is situated at Platovsky Avenue 68, is an important example of Greek Revival architecture. It is one of the oldest preserved samples of architecture in Novocherkassk. The prison was constructed in 1856. The building was designed by unknown architect in the classical style. It was ordered by appointed ataman Mikheil Khomutov. The military garrison headquarters has occupied the building since the 1990s. The military prison currently is located in the basement of this building. Among the inmates were: revolutionary, who took part in the assassination of Emperor Alexander II Nikolai Kibalchich, future poet, and a Hero of Socialist Labor (1970) Mikhail Isakovsky. Public flogging of workers who were sympathizers of the Bolsheviks in Novocherkassk military prison is described in Aleksey Tolstoy's novel The Ordeal.

== Description ==
The Military prison building was designed in the Classical Greek - Italian style. The portico is Ionic. In front of the vestibule is the portico of two Ionic columns and two pilasters with vertical fluting. Windows are decorated with segmental cornices and pilasters. At facade of the building the gable is finished with a triangular pediment with dentils. Above the steps runs a continuous sculptured frieze in low relief.
