= Pyotr Bestuzhev-Ryumin =

Russian statesman

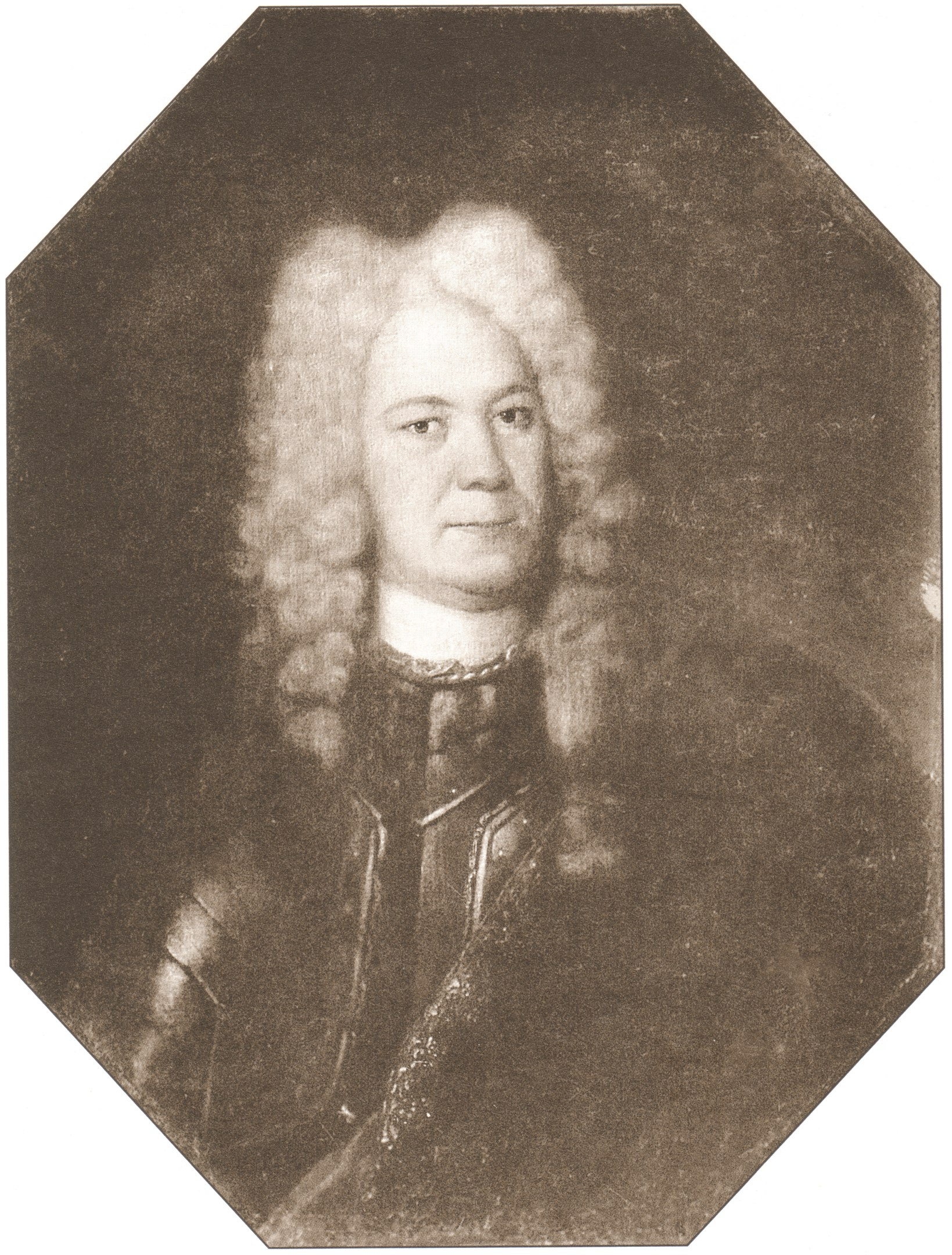
Portrait of Count Pyotr Mikhailovich Bestuzhev-Ryumin

Count Pyotr Mikhailovich Bestuzhev-Ryumin (Russian: Пётр Миха́йлович Бесту́жев-Рюмин, Latvian: Pēteris Bestuževs-Rjumins; 1664–1742) was a Russian statesman who effectively governed the Duchy of Courland in the name of Anna Ivanovna between 1712 and 1728.

Bestuzhev came from an ancient boyar family of Novgorod extraction. In 1701 he governed Simbirsk. Peter the Great sent him on diplomatic errands to Vienna and Berlin.

After the tsar's niece Anna Ivanovna widowed and became the Duchess Dowager of Courland in 1712, Bestuzhev was attached to her court in order to superintend Courland's policies and affairs. A year later he was transferred to The Hague, only to return to Anna's court in 1715. It is not entirely clear whether he was Anna's lover, but it is certain that his mistress was a sister of Ernst Johann Biron, the future duke.

The most powerful man in the duchy, Bestuzhev was implicated in intrigues to sell the crown to various German princes, whereupon he was forbidden to interfere into internal affairs of Courland. If anything of importance happened, he was to report to Prince Anikita Repnin, the Russian governor of Riga. This did not undermine Bestuzhev's authority in Mitau, however, and he remained in charge of the government until 1728.

When Aleksandr Menshikov contested Courland's throne with Maurice de Saxe, Bestuzhev supported the latter. In response, Menshikov had him arrested and delivered to Saint Petersburg. After Duchess Anna (who had supported him heretofore) accused him of mismanaging her affairs and embezzling the ducal treasury, only the intercession of his sons - Mikhail Bestuzhev-Ryumin and Aleksey Bestuzhev - helped him avoid criminal prosecution.

In 1730 Duchess Anna became Empress of Russia and her former prime minister was sent to govern Nizhny Novgorod. He publicly denounced the appointment as a semi-exile and on this account was commanded by his rival, Biron, to settle into retirement. Seven years later he was allowed to return to Moscow. Anna's successor Elizaveta Petrovna made him a count.

He was married to Evdokia Ivanovna Taltsina, who was the daughter of an admiral. In addition to his two sons, both counts, he had a daughter, Agrafena Petrovna, who was married to Prince Nikita Fedorovich Volonsky.
