= Novocherkassk Boys' Gymnasium =

Coordinates: 47.4200°N 40.0990°E

Novocherkassk boys' gymnasium
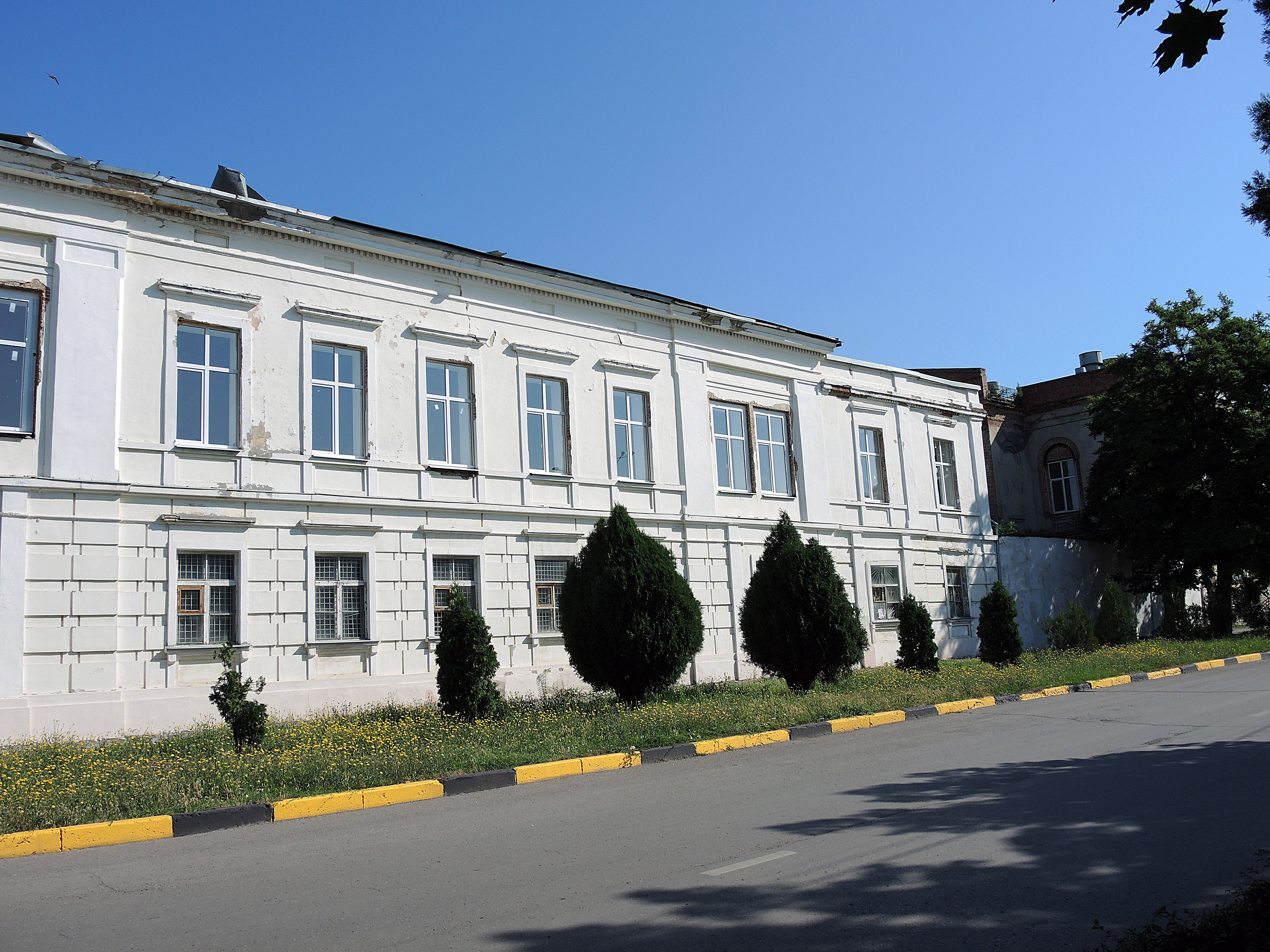
- Novocherkassk, Rostov Oblast; Russia

Information
- Established: 1875
- Website: sch3novoch11.narod.ru

Boys' gymnasium is a former school in the city of Novocherkassk, Rostov Oblast, Russia. Today Matvei Platov School is functioning in its building. Gymnasium building is considered to be an object of cultural heritage of federal importance.

== History ==
The gymnasium was constructed in 1875. The author of the project was Italian architect A. Campioni.

The building has two floors and is built of brick. Three slightly protruding corbels, measured rhythm of window openings in rectangular casings create its architectural appearance. The ground floor is rusticated, and the second floor is crowned with dentil cornice and parapet with a small bow-shaped fronton.

The building has a complex configuration. It is based on the corridor system, the classrooms are situated on both sides.

According to the memorial plate established in 1970, among the known gymnasium alumni were historian and Decembrist V.D. Sukhorukov, People's Will member Vasily Generalov, geologist and geographer Ivan Mushketov, artist I.I. Krylov and some other prominent people. Sukhorukov and Mushketov studied at the gymnasium building that had been located at the same place until 1875, though.
