= Fyodor Alexeyevich Golovin =

Russian statesman, diplomat, and military leader (1650–1706)

Fyodor Golovin
- Фёдор Головин
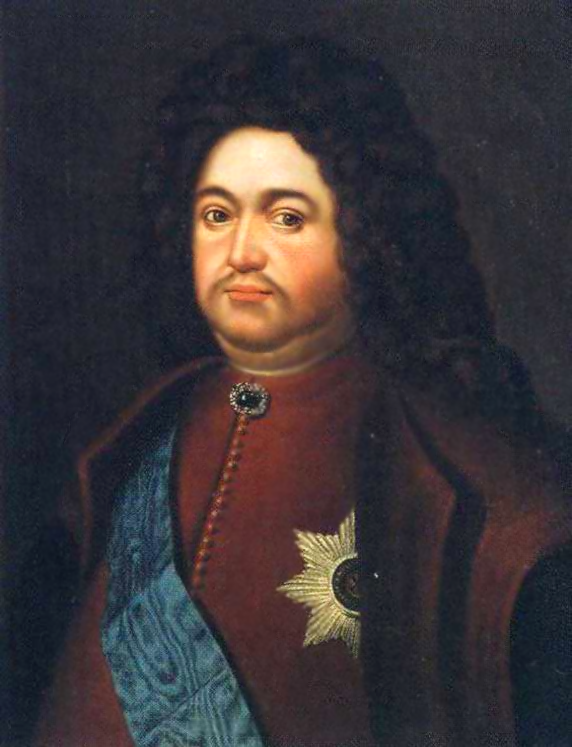

Foreign Minister of Russia
- In office 1700–1706
- Preceded by: Lev Naryshkin
- Succeeded by: Gavriil Golovkin

Personal details
- Born: 1650
- Died: 10 Aug [O.S. 30 July] 1706 Glukhov, Tsardom of Russia

Military service
- Rank: Field marshal General admiral

Count Fyodor Alexeyevich Golovin (Russian: Фёдор Алексеевич Головин; 1650 – 10 Aug [O.S. 30 July] 1706) was a Russian statesman, diplomat, and military leader. During the reign of Peter the Great, Golovin served as foreign minister from 1699–1706, and was the first Russian statesman to be styled chancellor, prior to the formal establishment of the rank in 1709. In addition to his political roles, he held the positions of field marshal and general admiral, mostly holding the titles nominally and acting more in the capacity of a military administrator.

== Biography ==
Golovin came from a family of Russian treasurers of Byzantine Greek descent.

=== Diplomatic career ===
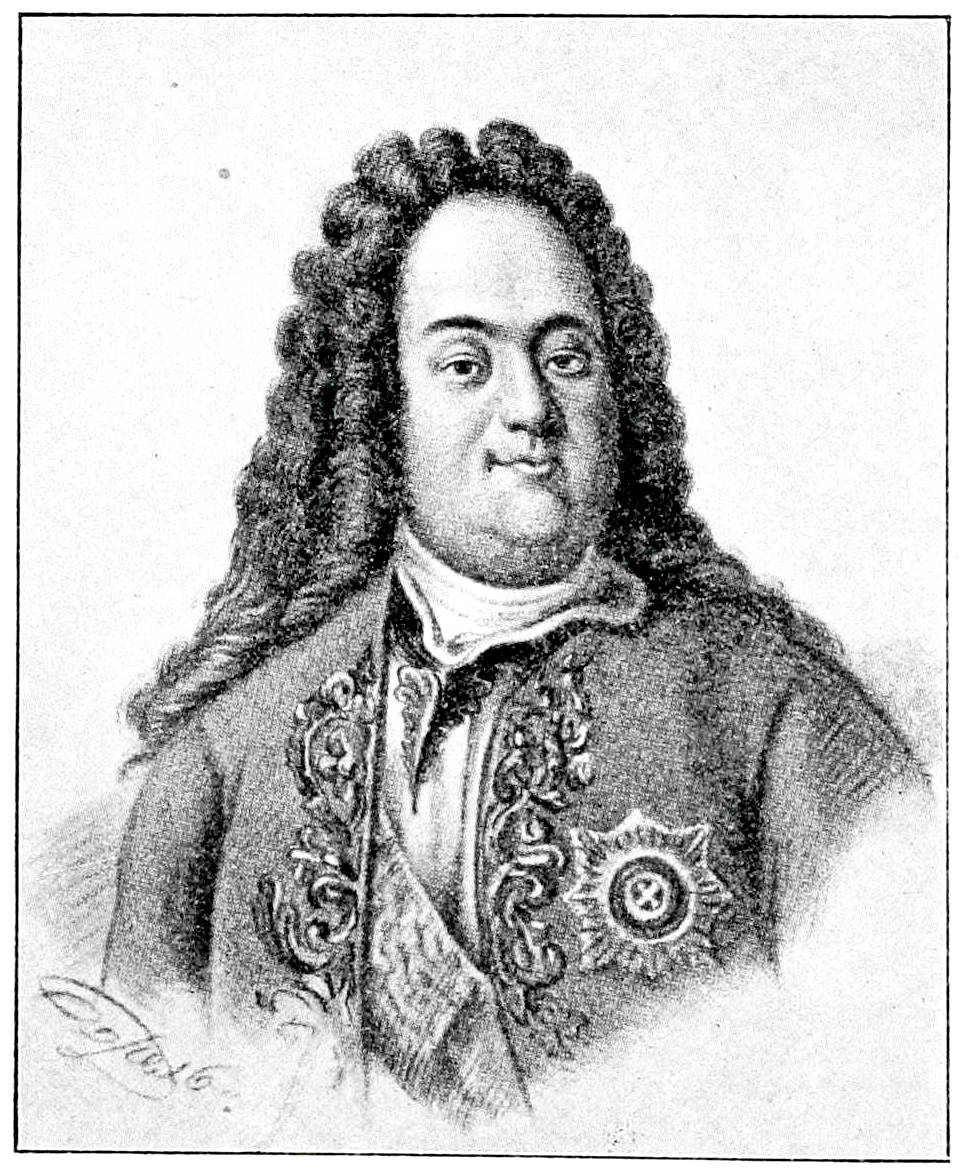
Portrait in the Sytin Military Encyclopedia

During the regency of Sophia Alekseyevna, Golovin was sent on a diplomatic mission to the Amur River region and entered into negotiations with the Qing dynasty over border disputes with Russia. In August 1689, he served as the Russian representative in signing the Treaty of Nerchinsk with the Qing. Upon his return to Moscow, he was granted the title of boyar by Peter the Great, who had overthrown Sophia, his half-sister, in September 1689.

In 1697, Golovin was appointed as one of three diplomats to head Peter's Grand Embassy to Western Europe, along with Franz Lefort, the chief ambassador, and Prokopii Voznitsyn. When Lefort died in 1699, Golovin succeeded him as general admiral. During this time, he also became the first person to be decorated with the newly instituted Order of St. Andrew.

=== Foreign minister ===
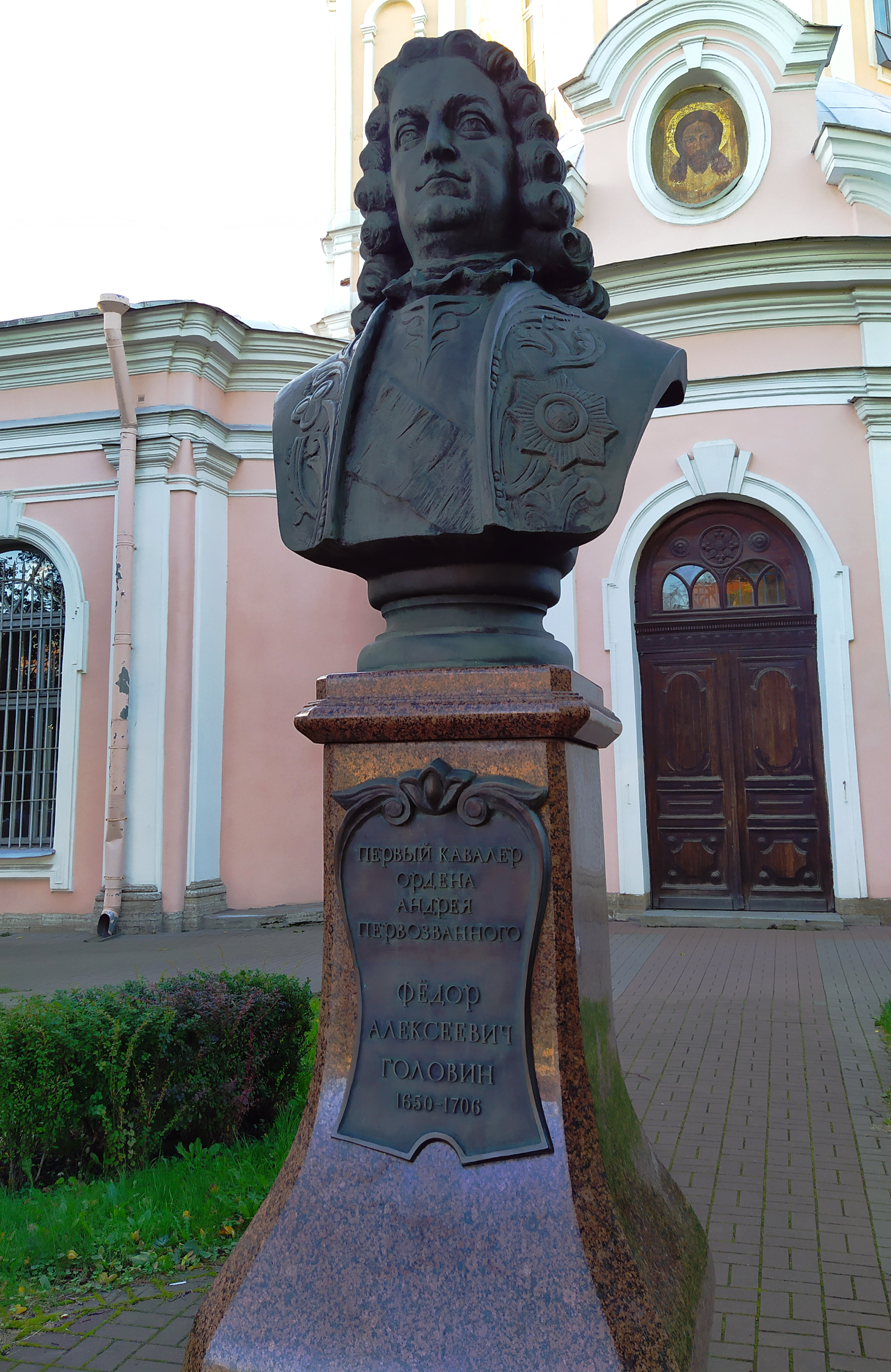
Monument to Fyodor Alekseevich Golovin in St. Petersburg, Vasilievsky Island.

Upon Lefort's death in March 1699, Golovin succeeded him as the de facto foreign minister until he was officially appointed as the head of the Ambassadorial Chancellery in February 1700. In October 1699, Golovin and Peter Shafirov participated in a secret meeting between Peter and Johann Patkul, in which Russia allied themselves with Saxony, Denmark–Norway, and the Polish–Lithuanian Commonwealth against Sweden in the upcoming Great Northern War. At the start of the conflict, he was appointed as a field marshal by Peter.

In June 1700, Golovin helped successfully negotiate the signing of the Treaty of Constantinople with the Ottoman Empire. The treaty extended Russian-Turkish peace for thirty years, and the Ottomans seceded the Azov region and additional territory in Kuban to Russia. The treaty secured the Russia's southern border with the Ottomans, and allowed it to focus more of its resources towards the Great Northern War until Ottoman involvement in 1710.

== Death ==
Golovin died on 10 Aug [O.S. 30 July] 1706, in Glukhov, on the road from Moscow to Kiev. His remains were transported to the Simonov Monastery.

== Sources ==
- "Головин, Федор Алексеевич" . Brockhaus and Efron Encyclopedic Dictionary (in Russian). 1906.
- Bushkovitch, Paul, A Concise History of Russia. New York: Cambridge University Press, 2012.
