= Andrey Osterman =

Russian statesman, vice-chancellor of Russian Empire (d. 1747)

Andrey Ostermann
- Андрей Остерман
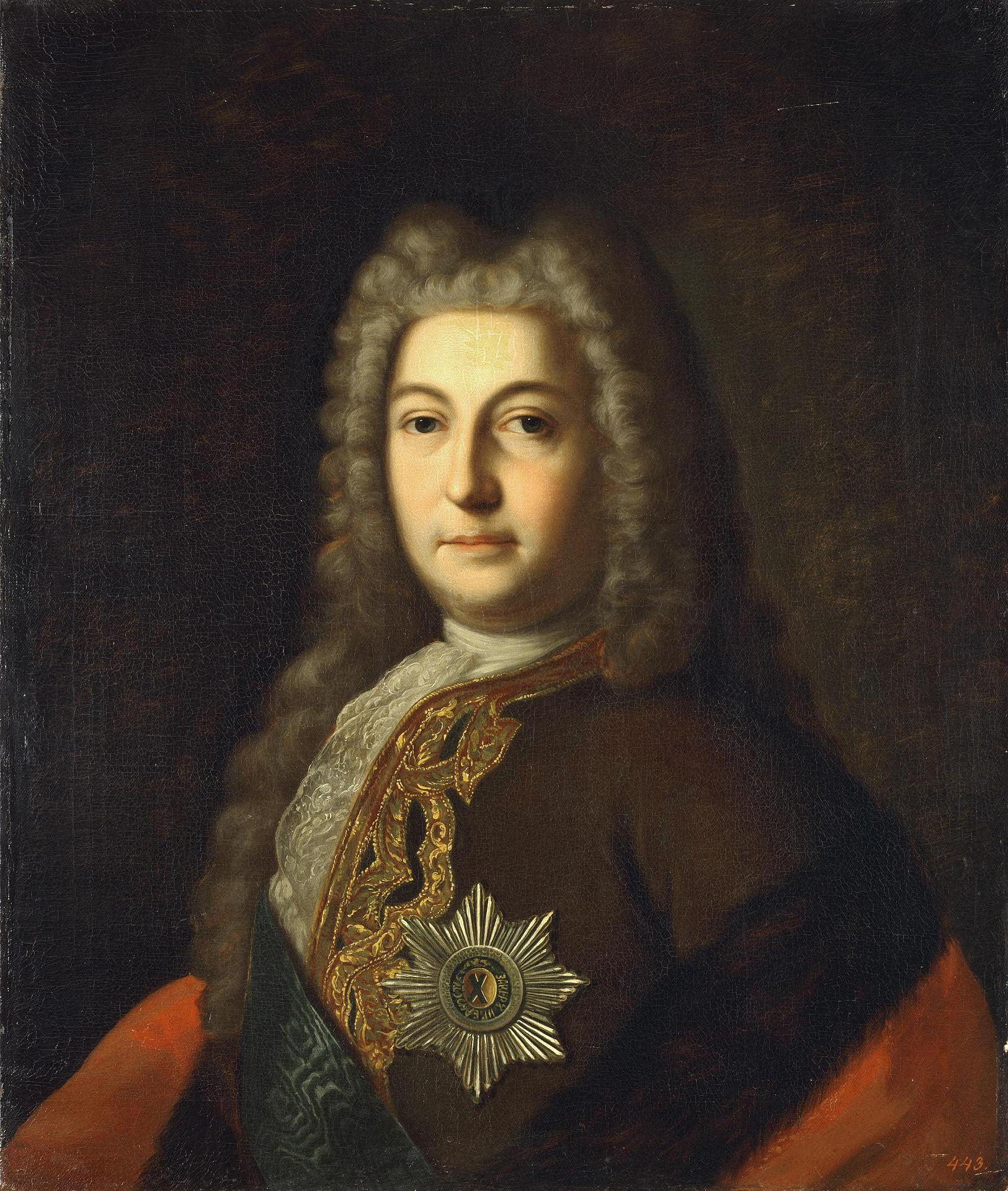

Minister of Foreign Affairs of Russia
- In office 1734–1740
- Monarchs: Empress Anna; Emperor Ivan VI; Grand Duchess Anna Leopoldovna
- Preceded by: Gavriil Golovkin
- Succeeded by: Alexey Cherkassky

Personal details
- Born: Heinrich Johann Friedrich Ostermann; 9 June 1686 Bochum, County of Mark, Holy Roman Empire
- Died: 31 May 1747 (aged 60) Beryozov, Russian Empire

Count Andrey Ivanovich Ostermann (Russian: Андрей Иванович Остерман, German: Heinrich Johann Friedrich Ostermann; 9 June 1686 – 31 May 1747) was a German-born Russian statesman who came to prominence under Peter the Great (r. 1682–1725) and served until the accession of the Tsesarevna Elizabeth in 1741. He based his foreign policy on the Austrian alliance.

== Early career ==
Born in Bochum in Westphalia, to a middle-class Lutheran pastor, his original name was Heinrich Johann Friedrich Ostermann. He studied languages at the University of Jena, learning German, Latin, French, Dutch, Italian, and Russian. Ostermann became secretary to Vice-Admiral Cornelis Kruse, who had a standing commission from Peter the Great to pick up promising young men, and soon thereafter entered the tsar's service. The young man's knowledge of the principal European languages made him the right hand of Vice-Chancellor Shafirov, whom he materially assisted during the troublesome negotiations which terminated in the peace of the Pruth (1711). Ostermann, together with General Bruce, represented Russia at the Åland peace congress of 1718. Shrewdly guessing that Sweden was at exhaustion point, and that Heinrich von Görtz, the Swedish plenipotentiary, was acting ultra vires, he advised Peter to put additional pressure on Sweden to force a peace.

== Diplomacy ==
In 1721, Ostermann concluded the Peace of Nystad with Sweden, and was created a baron for his services. In 1723, he was made vice-president of the ministry of foreign affairs for bringing about a very advantageous commercial treaty with Persia. Peter also constantly consulted him in domestic affairs, and he introduced many administrative novelties, e.g. "the Table of Ranks," and the reconstruction of the College of Foreign Affairs on more modern lines.

During the reign of Catherine I of Russia (1725–1727) Osterman's authority still further increased. The conduct of foreign affairs was left entirely in his hands, and he held also the posts of minister of commerce and postmaster-general. On the accession of Peter II of Russia Ostermann was appointed governor to the young emperor, and on his death (1730) he refused to participate in the attempt of Demetrius Galitzne and the Dolgorukovs to convert Russia into a limited constitutional monarchy. He held aloof till the empress Anne was firmly established on the throne as autocrat. Then he got his reward. His unique knowledge of foreign affairs made him indispensable to the empress and her counsellors, and even as to home affairs his advice was almost invariably followed. It was at his suggestion that the cabinet system was introduced into Russia.

All the useful reforms introduced between 1730 and 1740 are to be attributed to his initiative. He improved the state of trade, lowered taxation, encouraged industry and promoted education, ameliorated the judicature and materially raised the credit of Russia. As foreign minister he was cautious and circumspect, but when war was necessary he prosecuted it vigorously and left nothing to chance. The successful conclusions of the War of the Polish Succession (1733–1735) and of the Russo-Turkish War (1735–1739) were entirely due to his diplomacy.

== Vice-chancellor of all Russia ==
During the brief regency of Anna Leopoldovna (October 1740-December 1741) Ostermann stood at the height of his power, and the French ambassador, Marquis de La Chetardie, reported to his court that "it is not too much to say that he is tsar of all Russia" Ostermann's foreign policy was based upon the Austrian alliance. He had, therefore, guaranteed the Pragmatic Sanction with the deliberate intention of defending it. Hence the determination of France to remove him at any cost. Russia, as the natural ally of Austria, was very obnoxious to France; indeed it was only the accident of the Russian alliance which, in 1741, seemed to stand between Maria Theresa of Austria and absolute ruin. The most obvious method of rendering the Russian alliance unserviceable to the queen of Hungary was by implicating Russia in hostilities with her ancient rival, Sweden, and this was brought about, by French influence and French money, when in August 1741 the Swedish government, on the most frivolous pretexts, declared war against Russia. The dispositions previously made by Ostermann enabled him, however, to counter the blow, and all danger from Sweden was over when, early in September, Field-Marshal Lacy routed the Swedish general von Wrangel under the walls of the frontier-fortress of Villmanstrand, which was carried by assault.

== Downfall ==
It now became evident to La Chetardie that only a revolution would overthrow Osterman, and this he proposed to promote by elevating to the throne the tsesarevna Elizabeth, who hated the vice-chancellor because, though he owed everything to her father, he had systematically neglected her. Ostermann was therefore the first and the most illustrious victim of the coup d'état of 6 December 1741. Accused, among other things, of contributing to the elevation of the empress Anne by his cabals and of suppressing a supposed will of Catherine I made in favour of her daughter Elizabeth of Russia, he threw himself on the clemency of the new empress. He was condemned first to be broken on the wheel and then beheaded; but, reprieved on the scaffold, his sentence was commuted to lifelong banishment, with his whole family, to Beryozov in Siberia, where he died six years later, in 1747.

Ostermann's children returned to the court during the reign of Catherine the Great. His elder son, count Feodor Andreevich (1723–1804), was the senator and governor of Moscow (1773). Another son, Ivan Andreevich (1725–1811), was the Russian ambassador in Stockholm and then, for 16 years, the Chancellor of the Russian Empire (1781–97). After his death the Ostermann titles and estates passed to his nephew, Alexander Ivanovich Tolstoy, chancellor of the Russian military orders.
