= Gavriil Golovkin =

Russian statesman (1660–1734)

Count Gavriil Golovkin
- Гавриил Головкин
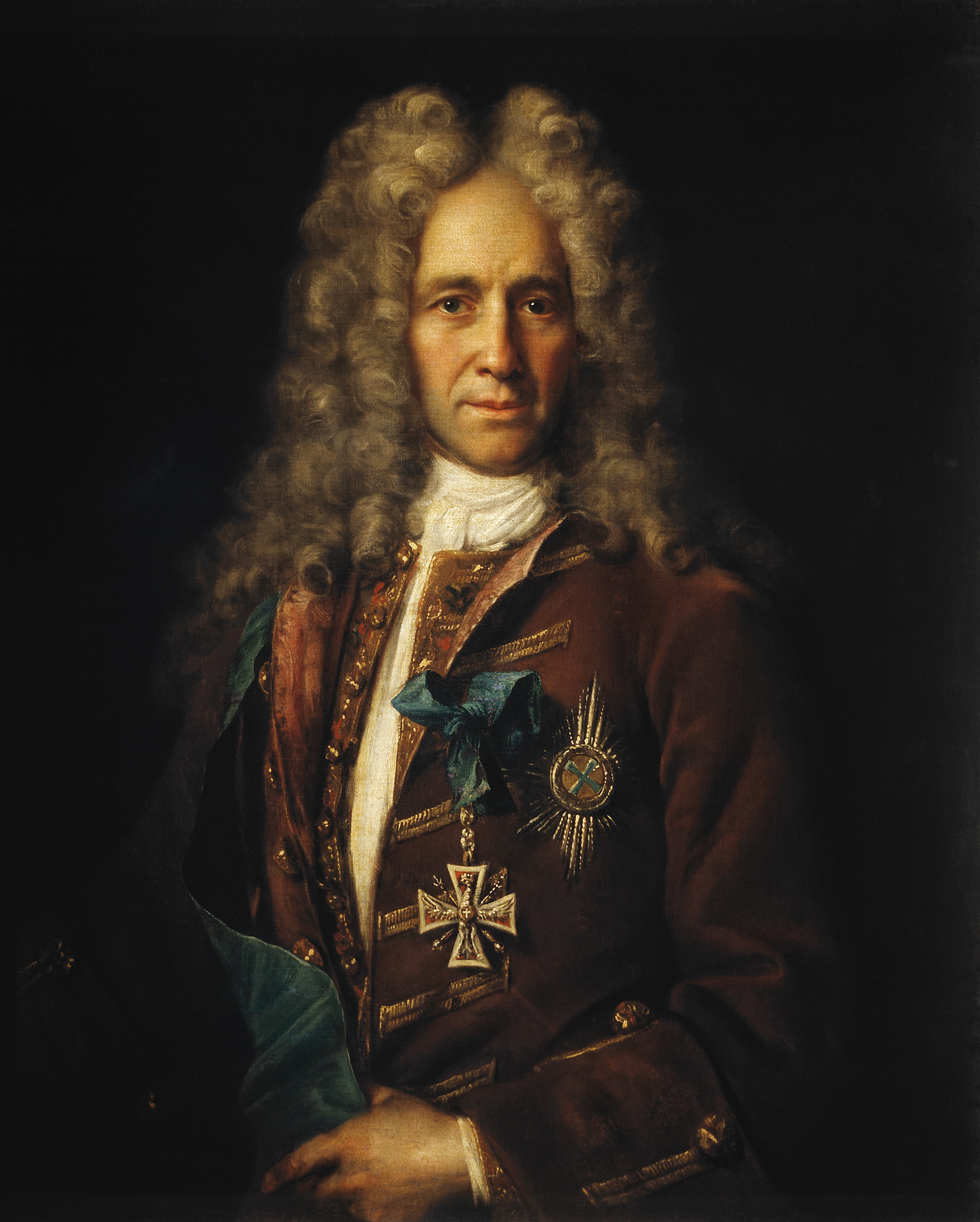
- Portrait by Ivan Nikitin, 1720s

State Chancellor of Russia (from 1721: Chancellor of the Russian Empire)
- In office 1709 – 20 January 1734
- Preceded by: Position formally established
- Succeeded by: Alexey Cherkassky

President of the Collegium of Foreign Affairs
- In office 1717–1734
- Preceded by: Position established
- Succeeded by: Andrey Osterman

Head of the Posolsky Prikaz
- In office 1708 – 15 December 1717
- Preceded by: Pyotr Shafirov
- Succeeded by: Position abolished

Personal details
- Born: Gavriil Ivanovich Golovkin; 1660 Moscow, Tsardom of Russia
- Died: 20 January 1734 (aged 73–74) Moscow, Russian Empire
- Profession: Statesman; diplomat
- Awards: Order of St. Andrew; Order of Saint Alexander Nevsky; Order of the White Eagle

Count Gavriil (Gavrila) Ivanovich Golovkin (Russian: Гаврии́л (Гаври́ла) Ива́нович Голо́вкин; 1660 – 20 January 1734) was a Russian statesman and diplomat who headed Russian foreign policy from 1706 until his death. In 1709, he became the first formally appointed State Chancellor of Russia, and from 1721 served as the first Chancellor of the Russian Empire. He was also the first President of the Collegium of Foreign Affairs (1717–1734) and a prominent member of both the Supreme Privy Council and the Cabinet of Ministers.

== Career ==
In 1677, while still a young man, Golovkin was attached to the court of Tsarevich Peter, with whose mother Nataliya he was connected, and vigilantly guarded him during the disquieting period of the regency of Sophia. During Peter's Grand Embassy abroad (1697–1698), Golovkin remained in Moscow as part of the administration governing the realm in the Tsar's absence. In 1706, he succeeded Golovin in the direction of foreign policy, and on the field of Poltava (1709) was created the first Russian State Chancellor. Golovkin held this office for 25 years.

In the reign of Catherine I, he became a member of the Supreme Privy Council, which had the chief conduct of affairs during this and the succeeding reigns. The empress also entrusted him with her last will whereby she appointed the young Peter II her successor and Golovkin one of his guardians. On the death of Peter II in 1730, he declared openly in favour of Anna, duchess of Courland, in opposition to the aristocratic Dolgorukovs and Galitzines, and his determined attitude on behalf of autocracy was the chief cause of the failure of the proposed constitution, which would have converted Russia into a limited monarchy. Under Anna, he was a member of the first cabinet formed in Russia, but had less influence in affairs than Osterman and Munnich.

In 1707, Golovkin was created a count of the Holy Roman Empire, and in 1710 a count of the Tsardom of Russia. He was one of the wealthiest, and at the same time one of the stingiest, magnates of his day. His ignorance of any language but his own made his intercourse with foreign ministers very inconvenient. For the ultimate disgrace of his relatives, see the Lopukhina Affair. Yury Golovkin, Russia's first ambassador to China, was his great-grandson.

== Sources ==
- "Головкин, Гавриил Иванович" . Brockhaus and Efron Encyclopedic Dictionary (in Russian). 1906.
