= Alexey Cherkassky =

Russian statesman (1680–1742)

Alexey Mikhailovich Cherkassky
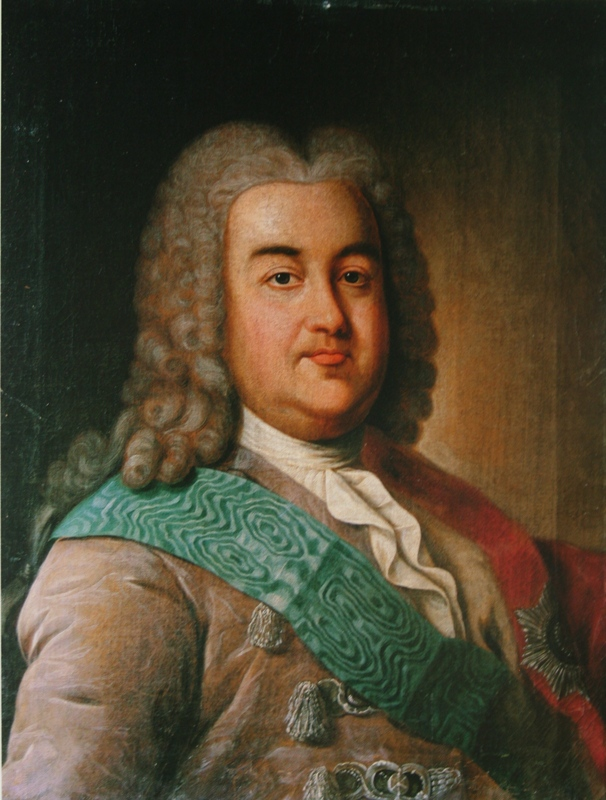
- Portrait by Ivan Argunov, 1760s

Chancellor of the Russian Empire
- In office 1740–1742

Personal details
- Born: 8 October 1680 Moscow, Russia
- Died: 15 November 1742 (aged 62) Moscow, Russia

Prince Alexey Mikhailovich Cherkassky or Tcherkassky (Russian: Алексей Михайлович Черкасский, 8 October [O.S. 28 September] 1680 – 15 November [O.S. 4 November] 1742) was a Russian statesman who served as the chancellor from 1740 to 1742, at the beginning of Empress Elizabeth's reign.

== Life ==
Cherkassky as the son of Mikhail Yakovlevich Cherkassky was a member of one of Russia's richest families which descended from the sovereign rulers of Circassia, a relation to Prince Alexander Bekovich-Cherkassky. His surname translates as "Circassian".

His mother was Marfa Yakovlevna Odoevskaya daughter of Yakov Nikitich Odoevsky who had served as military commander under and later bodyguard to Alexis I.

In 1702, Prince Cherkassky held a post of senior stolnik (tsar's personal assistant) and was soon assigned to assist his father, Prince Mikhail Yakovlevich Cherkassky, who had been a voivode in Tobolsk at that time. Tcherkassky served under his father for 10 years and in 1714 was summoned to Saint Petersburg. There, he was appointed member of the Urban Construction Commission.

In 1719, Peter the Great sent Aleksey to Siberia as governor. In 1726, he became a senator. During the election of Anna Ivanovna for the Russian throne in 1730, Cherkassky, the richest man in Russia in terms of the amount of serfs he owned at that time, was in charge of the gentry party, which had been in opposition to the verkhovniki (members of the Supreme Privy Council).

For his services to the Crown he was appointed one of the three cabinet ministers and was promoted to the rank of grand chancellor in 1740. As a cabinet minister, Tcherkassky signed a trade agreement with Great Britain in 1734. In his post as chancellor, he signed a treaty with Prussia in 1740 and Great Britain in 1741.

A Baroque palace built for Prince Cherkassky on Palace Quay to Yeropkin's designs has been rebuilt into the Novo-Mikhailovsky Palace.

== Marriages and children ==
Married firstly to Agrafena Naryshkina, daughter of the boyar Lev Kirillovich Naryshkin, who was the maternal uncle of Peter the Great. This marriage to a first cousin to the tsar was a very advantageous match.

After his wife's death in 1709, Cherkassky remarried to Maria Trubetskaya in 1710.

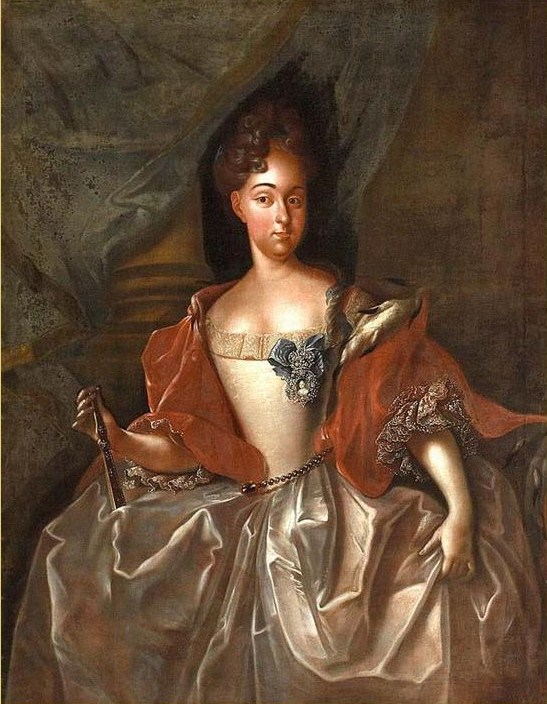
Maria Trubetskaya by Ivan Argunov

The couple had a daughter, Varvara (b. 1711), who inherited her fathers fortune, and married Pyotr Borisovich Sheremetev.

== Death ==
Cherkassky died on June 1712.
