= Rumyantsev (disambiguation) =

Rumyantsev was a family of Russian counts. Rumyantsev may also refer to

- Rumyantsev (surname)
- Rumyantsev Museum in Moscow
- The Rumyantsev Case, a 1956 Soviet film
- Operation Polkovodets Rumyantsev, a World War II military operation
