= Rumyantsev (surname) =

Rumyantsev (Russian: Румянцев), or Rumyantseva (feminine; Румянцева), is a Russian surname. It may refer to the following people:

- The Rumyantsev family, a prominent Russian family in the 18th and early 19th centuries
- Alexander Rumyantsev — several people
- Andrei Rumyantsev (born 1969), Russian football player
- Maria Rumyantseva (1699–1788), Russian lady in waiting
- Mikhail Nikolayevich Rumyantsev (1901–1983), Soviet clown, better known by his stage name Karandash
- Nadezhda Rumyantseva (1930–2008), Russian comedy actress
- Nikita Rumyantsev (born 1988), Russian politician
- Nikolai Rumyantsev (historian) (1892–1956), Soviet historian of Christianity
- Nikolay Rumyantsev (1754–1826), Russian Foreign Minister and Imperial Chancellor
- Pyotr Rumyantsev (1725–1796), Russian field marshal
- Valentin Rumyantsev (1921–2007), Soviet scientist in the field of mechanics
