= Alexei Bogdanov (chemist and molecular biologist) =

Soviet and Russian chemist

Alexei Alexeevich Bogdanov
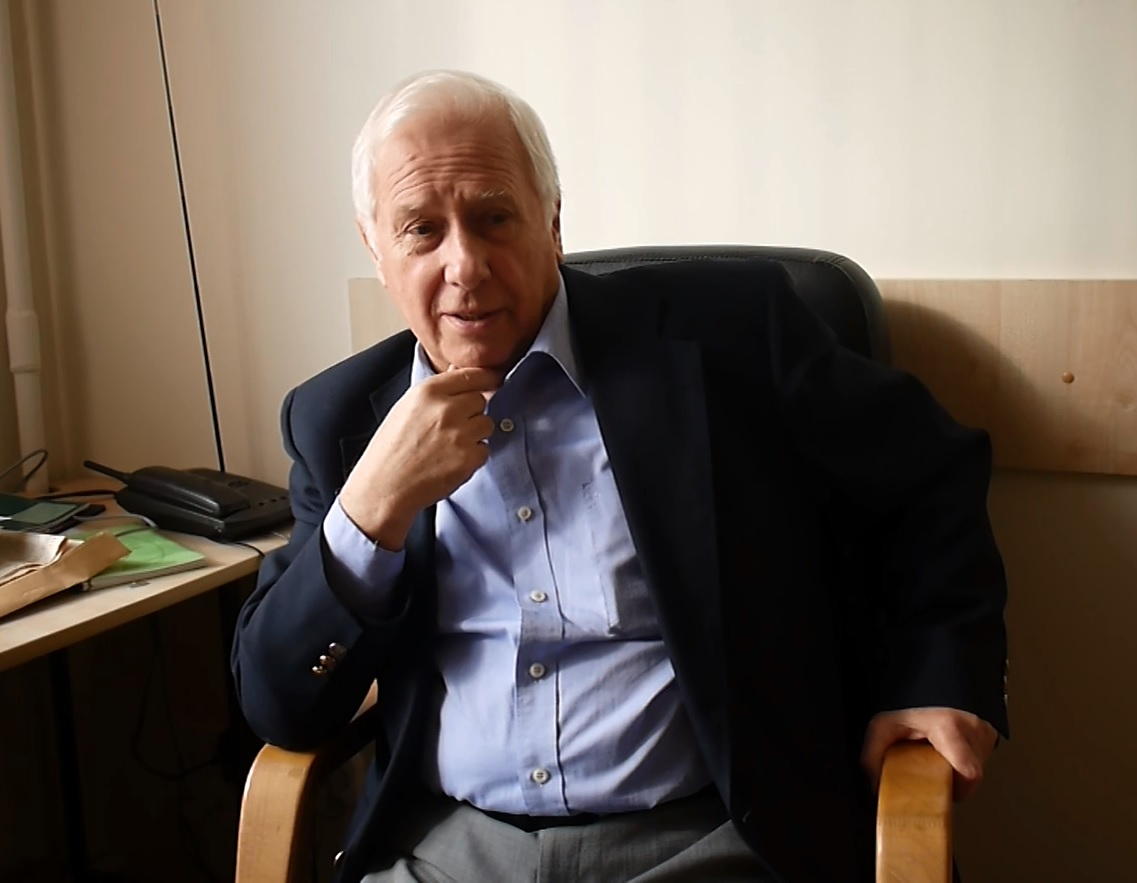
- Bogdanov in December 2014
- Born: October 11, 1935 (age 90); Moscow, USSR
- Citizenship: Russia
- Education: Moscow State University
- Scientific career
- Fields: Molecular biology, Bioorganic chemistry
- Workplaces: Belozersky Research Institute of Physical and Chemical Biology, Moscow State University
- Alexei Bogdanov's voice Recorded 14 October 2012

Alexei Alexeevich Bogdanov (born October 11, 1935, in Moscow) is a Soviet and Russian chemist and molecular biologist, Academician of the Russian Academy of Sciences (since 1994); Corresponding Member of the USSR Academy of Sciences (1984–1994). Professor and (from 1985 to 2010) head of the Department of Chemistry of Natural Compounds at the Faculty of Chemistry, M.V. Lomonosov Moscow State University (MSU). He specializes in bioorganic chemistry and molecular biology and made fundamental contributions to understanding the structure and function of ribosomes, the interaction of nucleic acids with proteins, and the mechanisms of protein biosynthesis.

== Biography ==
=== International Recognition and Leadership ===
In 1984, he was elected a Corresponding Member of the USSR Academy of Sciences. In 1994, he was elected an Academician of the Russian Academy of Sciences (RAS). From 1985 to 2010, he headed the Department of Chemistry of Natural Compounds at the Faculty of Chemistry of Moscow State University. At the A.N. Belozersky Research Institute of Physico-Chemical Biology, Bogdanov served as Department Head until 2002, deputy director of the institute, and from 2001 onwards as Principal Research Fellow in the same department.

He served as visiting professor at Harvard University (1966–1967), the Massachusetts Institute of Technology (MIT) (1976–1977), universities in Italy (1986, 1993), and Bulgaria (1978, 1988).

He is a member of the Russian Society of Biochemists and Molecular Biologists; a member of the European Academy of Sciences and its Presidium (since 2000); a foreign member of the Academy of Sciences of Lithuania (since 2002); a member of the Harvard Chemists Society; an honorary consultant of the International Institute of Molecular and Cellular Biology (Warsaw, Poland); a member of the expert council of the Federation of European Biochemical Societies (FEBS) (2002–2006).

== Scientific research ==
Bogdanov's scientific career, spanning over six decades, was characterized by contributions to understanding the structure and function of the ribosome. He is the author and co-author of more than 270 scientific publications, 5 monographs, and 3 textbooks.

=== Covalent Compounds of Nucleic Acids with Proteins ===
Bogdanov's primary research direction involved studying complexes of nucleic acids with proteins. One of his most significant achievements was demonstrating in the early 1960s the existence of natural covalent compounds of nucleic acids with proteins for both DNA and high-molecular-weight RNA. Based on experimental data, he proposed that natural preparations of nucleic acids contain a protein fraction that could be covalently bound to DNA and RNA rather than merely adsorbed on their surface. Subsequently, jointly with Zoe Shabarova, the principal synthesis methods for such compounds were developed.

=== Structure and Dynamics of Ribosomes ===
A major discovery by Bogdanov was the phenomenon of reversible unfolding (dissociation) of ribosomes upon changes in ionic strength, especially at lowered Mg²⁺ concentration. Working with R.S. Shakulov and N.A. Kiselev, he demonstrated that prokaryotic ribosomes could unfold when the magnesium concentration decreased, losing their compact structure and transforming into extended ribonucleoprotein fibres while retaining all ribosomal proteins on the RNA scaffold. Upon restoration of the original Mg²⁺ concentration, ribosomes spontaneously recovered their compact native structure and catalytic activity.

=== Functional Centers of the Ribosome ===
Bogdanov developed and applied the photoaffinity modification method — a technique in which a photosensitive group is attached to a functional ligand. When such a ligand binds to the ribosome, it is irradiated with UV light, leading to formation of a covalent bond between the ligand and nearby nucleotides or amino acid residues of the ribosome. Using this method, key elements of the ribosomal decoding center — the site where genetic information is read from messenger RNA and where high-fidelity codon–anticodon recognition occurs between mRNA and transfer RNA — were identified.

=== Studies of the Ribosomal Tunnel ===
In the early twenty-first century, Bogdanov focused on investigating the ribosomal tunnel — a channel inside the large ribosomal subunit through which the growing polypeptide chain passes during protein biosynthesis. His laboratory conducted detailed investigations of how tunnel structure affects the elongation process, how various translation inhibitors interact with the tunnel, and how the tunnel participates in translation regulation. Publications on this topic have practical significance for developing new antibiotics and understanding mechanisms of microbial resistance to antimicrobial agents.

From 2013 to 2023, Bogdanov headed the research project 'Design and production of antibacterial substances based on structural analysis of ribosomes. DNA aptamers as promising therapeutic agents.'

== Pedagogical activity ==
Among Bogdanov's students were more than 11 Doctors of Science (D.Sc.) and more than 40 Candidates of Science (Ph.D.). In 1961–1962, he created a practical course in protein and nucleic acid chemistry, which remains in use to the present day. For faculty students, he taught courses on "Fundamentals of Molecular Biology," "Nucleic Acids: Structure and Functions," and "Chemical Basis of Biological Processes." He served as chief editor of the Russian translation of the textbook Lehninger Principles of Biochemistry.

He was deputy chief editor of the journal Biochemistry (Biokhimiya). In 2020, the journal organized a special issue dedicated to Bogdanov's jubilee.

== Honors and awards ==
- Fulbright Prize (United States, 1976)
- USSR State Prize in Science and Technology — for the cycle of work "Structural Foundations of Protein Biosynthesis on Ribosomes" (1986)
- Order of Honor — for services to the state and great personal contribution to the development of science (1996)
- M.V. Lomonosov Prize, First Class, Moscow State University (1997)
- Humboldt Research Award (''Humboldt-Forschungspreis'') (2000)
- Membership in the European Academy of Sciences (since 2000)
- M.M. Shemyakin Prize, Russian Academy of Sciences (2001) — for the cycle of works "Structural-Functional Analysis of RNA in Complex Ribonucleoproteins"
- Foreign Member, Academy of Sciences of Lithuania (since 2002)
- Member of the Expert Council of the Federation of European Biochemical Societies (FEBS) (2002–2006)
- Order of Friendship— for services in scientific and pedagogical activities and great contribution to the training of highly qualified specialists (2005)
- A.N. Belozersky Prize, Russian Academy of Sciences — for the cycle of works "Ribosome: Functional Centers and Inhibitors" (2016)
- Order of Alexander Nevsky — for great contribution to the development of science and many years of conscientious work (May 18, 2022)
- Honors Diploma of the Government of the Russian Federation — for services in research activities, development of education, and many years of productive work (December 21, 2024)
