= Shabarov =

Shabarov, feminine: Shabarova is a Russian-language surname. Notable people with the surname include:

- Yevgeny Shabarov (1922–2003), Soviet rocket and space engineer
- Yuri Shabarov (1919–2005), Soviet and Russian organic chemist
- Zoya Shabarova (1925–1999), Soviet and Russian organic chemist
