= Yuri Shabarov =

Russian organic chemistry scientist

- Юрий Сергеевич Шабаров
- Born: July 5, 1919; Moscow, RSFSR
- Died: October 30, 2005 (aged 86); Moscow, Russian Federation
- Education: Moscow State University, 1948
- Occupation: Scientist
- Organization: Moscow State University
- Spouse: Zoe Shabarova (1950)
- Children: Alexey Yuryevich Shabarov

Yuri Sergeevich Shabarov (August 5, 1919, Moscow, RSFSR — October 30, 2005, Moscow, Russian Federation) was a Soviet and Russian organic chemist, the founder of arylcyclopropane chemistry, the author of 25 patents for the synthesis of compounds from ortho-substituted arylated cyclopropanes. He is the author or coauthor of many textbooks on organic chemistry.

== Early life and education ==
Yuri Shabarov was born on August 5, 1919, in Moscow. He graduated from high school with a gold medal in 1938 and entered the Faculty of Chemistry at Moscow State University (MSU) the same year.

In November 1941, during World War II, Shabarov was conscripted into the Red Army, serving until May 1946 and attaining the rank of senior lieutenant. After his military service, Shabarov resumed his studies and graduated with honors from MSU in 1948. He entered the graduate program at the MSU Chemistry Research Institute in October 1948 and defended his PhD thesis in October 1951.

== Academic career ==
Upon completing his postgraduate studies, Shabarov began his academic career at MSU as a junior researcher. In August 1953, he was appointed acting senior researcher, and by December 1954, he was promoted to senior researcher. In June 1959, Shabarov earned the title of Docent of the Faculty of Chemistry. He defended his doctoral dissertation in 1964. In December 1967, he was appointed acting professor, and in September 1969, he became a full professor at the Faculty of Chemistry.

Yuri Sergeevich also actively engaged in organizational and administrative activities. From 1969 to 1976, he was a member of the Academic Council of the N.D. Zelinsky Institute of Organic Chemistry. Between 1974 and 1985, he served as a member of the Academic Council of the Faculty of Chemistry at Moscow State University, and from 1981 to 1995, he was Deputy Chairman of the Department.

In addition, Shabarov held various positions at the Chemical Department over the years, including Deputy Dean (1954), Chairman of the Admissions Committee (1962–1964), Head of the Organic Chemistry Practicum (1968–1980), Head of the Laboratory of Organic Synthesis (1971–1989), and Deputy Head of the Department of Organic Chemistry (1976–1986). In 1994, he was hired as a consulting professor at the Department of Organic Chemistry and combined it with the position of professor until August 31, 2005.

== Research and scientific contributions ==
Yuri Sergeevich Shabarov's scientific interests were closely tied to the chemistry of small carbocycles. He was a pioneer in the field of arylated cyclopropane chemistry in Russia, and his work earned widespread recognition internationally. Over his career, Shabarov published more than 350 scientific papers, which highlighted a range of novel and specific reactions of functionally substituted arylcyclopropanes. His research explored the unique properties of three-membered carbocycles with aromatic nuclei, including phenomena such as the cyclopropane ortho effect during nitration, ipso-electrophilic attack on the cyclopropane fragment, and the initiating role of small carbocycles in intramolecular rearrangements and transformations.

Shabarov made significant contributions to both fundamental and applied arylcyclopropane chemistry, widely acknowledged by the scientific community. His studies on fundamental mechanisms included the nitration of arylcyclopropanes, nitrodealkylation, electrophile-catalyzed nucleophilic substitution, proton-catalyzed rearrangements, cyclizations, heterocyclizations, and isomerizations of cyclopropyl-substituted substrates. On the applied side, he developed synthetic methods for functionally substituted arylcyclopropanes and various heterocycles such as benzoxazoles, oxazoles, benzoxazines, benzodiazepines, indoles, indazoles, quinolines, and quinolones.

Shabarov's research also demonstrated that the reaction patterns observed in the nitration and electrophile-catalyzed transformations of functionally substituted arylcyclopropanes were characteristic of aromatic substrates capable of generating benzyl and homobenzyl carbocations during the reaction.

His work laid the foundation for the study of ortho-substituted arenes, a promising field for the synthesis of various heterocycles, including natural compounds, potential drugs, and biologically active substances. Findings from Shabarov's research—such as the mechanisms of arylcyclopropane reactions with electrophiles, acid-catalyzed rearrangements, and heterocyclizations—have been included in reference materials, review articles, and textbooks authored by both domestic and international scientists.

Yuri Sergeevich obtained 25 inventor's certificates for his innovations, primarily for methods of synthesizing compounds from ortho-substituted arylcyclopropanes. Notably, nine of these certificates were classified with the "Not for open publication" restriction by the Committee for Inventions and Discoveries of the USSR. This classification was due to Shabarov's 30 years of collaboration, from 1965 to 1995, with various organizations within the military-industrial complex.

== Teaching activity ==
Shabarov began his educational activity in 1951. From the very start of his work at the Chemical Department, he actively engaged in student education, leading seminars and practical classes for third-year students and supervising coursework and diploma projects. Between 1964 and 1968, following the defense of his doctoral dissertation, he taught his own course, "Synthetic Methods in Organic Chemistry." On the recommendation of A.N. Nesmeyanov, Head of the Department of Organic Chemistry, Shabarov taught the general course "Organic Chemistry" for 25 years, from 1968 to 1993.

In 1994, the first edition of the two-volume textbook Organic Chemistry, written by Shabarov and based on his lectures, was published for students of chemistry faculties and higher educational institutions. Due to its popularity, the textbook was reissued three times. It also received high praise from other professors for its comprehensive coverage and logical presentation of fundamental concepts.

From 1994, Shabarov delivered a specialized course, Carbohydrate Chemistry, for students focusing on natural compound chemistry. In 1998, he published the methodological guide Mono– and Disaccharides, tailored for the specialized course as well as the general curriculum for chemistry students on the topic of natural compounds. Shabarov also co-authored several textbooks and educational materials with faculty members of the Department of Organic Chemistry at Moscow State University, some of which were translated into foreign languages. These include Practical Work in Organic Chemistry, Laboratory Exercises in Organic Practicum, and Problems and Exercises in Organic Chemistry (the latter translated into English and Spanish).

Under Shabarov's supervision, more than 120 diploma theses, 30 candidate dissertations, and two doctoral dissertations (in 1984 and 1992) were successfully defended.

His teaching activities and lectures were highly appreciated both by the faculty and the administration of Moscow State University, as well as by the students, who emphasized Shabarov's lecturing skills, his intelligence and tact in communication, and his ability to avoid conflicts.

== Family ==
Yuri Shabarov's wife, Zoya Alekseevna Shabarova (1925–1999), was a bioorganic chemist specializing in nucleic acid chemistry. She married him in 1950.

Their son, Alexey Yuryevich Shabarov (b. 1953), holds a PhD in Physics and Mathematics. He worked at the Faculty of Computational Mathematics and Cybernetics at MSU and later became an employee of the Research Institute of Technical Physics and Automation.

== Hobbies ==
Yuri Sergeevich Shabarov was actively passionate about sports. He held a first-class rank in tennis and shared his enthusiasm with his students. According to accounts, his laboratory sessions often began with a "sports five-minute discussion", where recent sports events were discussed. In addition to sports, Shabarov was fond of painting, graphic arts, and sculpture. Later in life, he also developed interests in philately and fishing.

== Award and honors ==
Yuri Sergeevich Shabarov received numerous awards and honors throughout his career:

- USSR Council of Ministers Prize (1988) ("For his outstanding work in the field of ortho-substituted arylcyclopropane chemistry.")
- Order of Honor (1999), conferred by Presidential Decree No. 1562 ("For his contributions to science and higher education.")
- Medal for Labor Valor (1976)
- Medal "For the Victory over Germany in the Great Patriotic War 1941–1945" (1945) and Medal "For the Victory over Japan" (1946)
- Order of the Patriotic War, II Class (1985)
- Eleven additional medals, including nine commemorative medals celebrating milestones of World War II victories

Honorary Titles:

- "Distinguished Professor of Moscow State University"
- "Soros Distinguished Professor"
