= Alexander Rumyantsev =

Alexander Rumyantsev or Aleksander Rumyantsev may refer to:

- Alexander Rumyantsev (nobleman) (1677–1749), Russian nobleman and assistant of Peter the Great
- Alexander Rumyantsev (minister) (born 1945), Russian minister
- Alexander Rumyantsev (politician) (born 1947), Russian politician
- Alexander Rumyantsev (speed skater) (born 1986), Russian speed skater
