= Alexander Rumyantsev (nobleman) =

Russian nobleman and assistant of Peter the Great

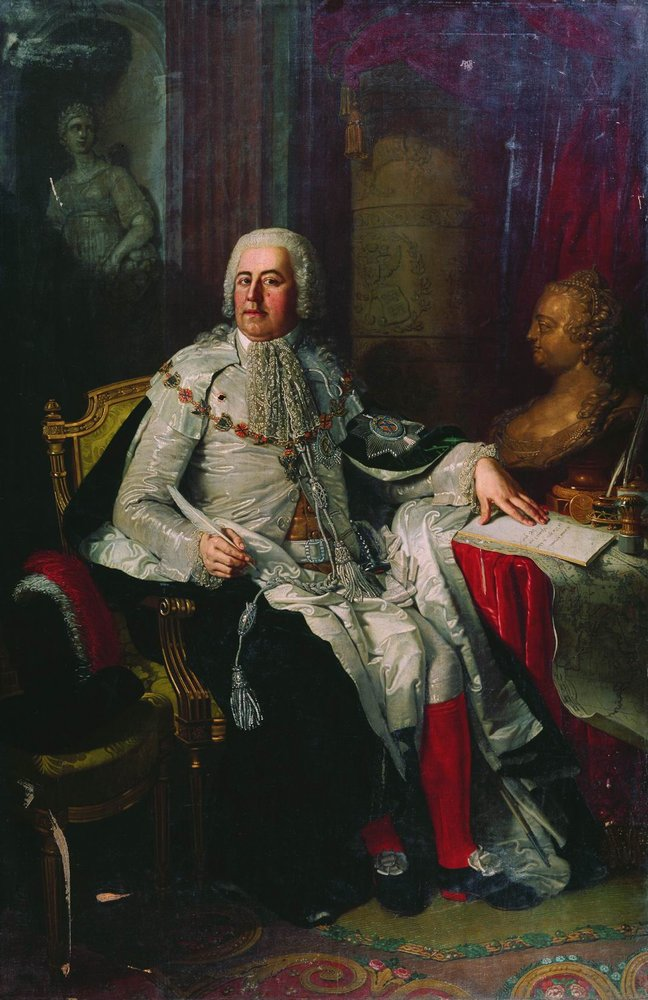
A posthumous portrait by Vladimir Borovikovsky

Count Alexander Ivanovich Rumyantsev (Russian: Алекса́ндр Ива́нович Румя́нцев) (1677–1749) was an assistant of Peter the Great and father of Field Marshal Peter Rumyantsev-Zadunaisky. He came from the Rumyantsev family, which, though little known and documented in the 17th century, later claimed descent from a prominent 14th-century boyar.

Alexander enrolled in the Preobrazhensky regiment of guards in 1704. While he guarded the headquarters of Peter the Great, the monarch noticed him "for his great height and smart face". Peter made Alexander Ivanovich his servant and later recommended him to Peter Shafirov and Peter Tolstoy. In the service of these two courtiers, Rumyantsev led a mission to capture hetman Pavlo Polubotok and carried out various diplomatic errands in Constantinople and Persia.

In 1720, he married the daughter and heiress of Count Andrey Matveyev, Countess Maria Matveyeva, who was rumored to have been intimate with the Tsar. His wife survived him by 40 years, and entertained Saint Petersburg society with the stories of her acquaintance with Louis XIV, Madame de Maintenon, and the Duke of Marlborough. When she died at 90, Gavrila Derzhavin wrote a remarkable ode glorifying her virtues.

From 1736 he served in the army of Burkhard Christoph von Münnich, and took part in the Siege of Ochakov (1737), being a division commander.

After Peter I's daughter Elizabeth Petrovna came to the throne in 1741, Rumyantsev regained favor, became a count and went to govern Malorossia, or left-bank Ukraine. It was he who negotiated and signed the Treaty of Åbo with Sweden. His diplomatic experience seemed to open the prospect of Rumyantsev succeeding Aleksey Bestuzhev as the Chancellor, but this appointment never eventuated. He died in Ukraine on March 4, 1749, leaving a son, Peter "of the Danube", and a daughter, Daria, married to the Austrian count Wallenstein.

• "Румянцов, Александр Иванович". Russian Biographical Dictionary (in Russian). 1899.
