= Pyotr Rumyantsev =

Russian military leader (1725–1796)

Count Pyotr Rumyantsev Zadunaisky
- Пётр Румянцев
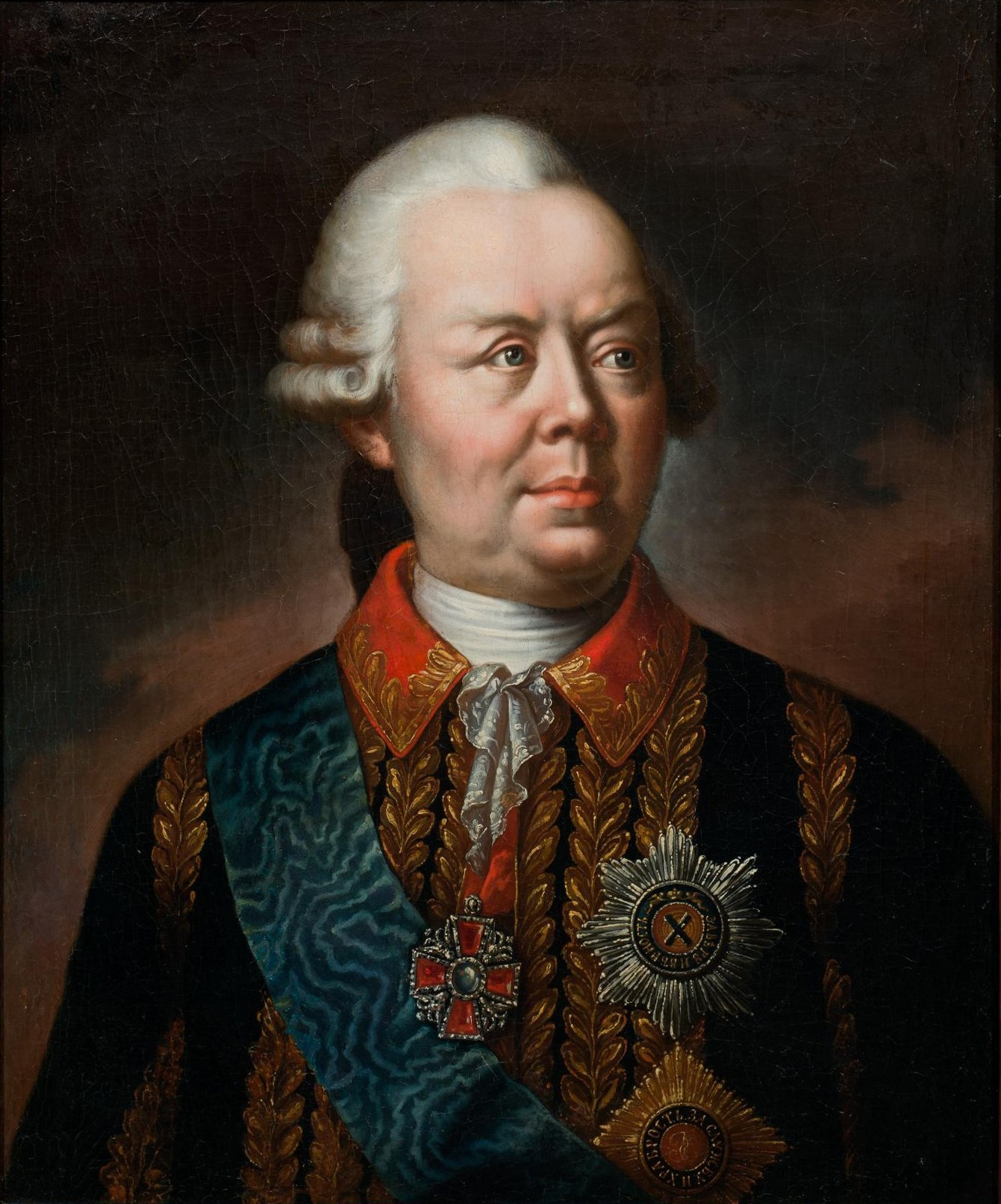
- Portrait by an unknown artist, 1770s

General Governor of Little Russia Little Russian Collegium Chair
- In office 1764–1786
- Monarch: Catherine the Great
- Preceded by: office revived (replacing the Hetman of Zaporizhian Host Kirill Razumovsky)
- Succeeded by: office liquidated (himself as General Governor of Kiev, Chernigov, Novgorod-Seversky)

General Governor of Kursk Namestnichestvo
- In office 1779–1781
- Monarch: Catherine the Great
- Preceded by: office created
- Succeeded by: Alexander Prozorovsky

General Governor of Kiev, Chernigov, and Novgorod-Seversky Namestnichestvos
- In office 1782–1796
- Monarchs: Catherine the Great (1782–1796), Paul I (1796)
- Deputy: Mikhail Krechetnikov (1791–1793), Iosif Igelström (1793–1794)
- Preceded by: office created
- Succeeded by: office liquidated

Personal details
- Born: Pyotr Aleksandrovich Rumyantsev; 15 January 1725 Stroiești, Crown of the Kingdom of Poland or Moscow, Russian Empire
- Died: 19 December 1796 (aged 71) Tashan, Pereyaslavsky Uyezd, Poltava Governorate, Russian Empire
- Awards: See § Honours

Military service
- Allegiance: Russian Empire
- Branch/service: Imperial Russian Army
- Rank: Field Marshal
- Battles/wars: Tree List: War of the Austrian Succession; Rhine Campaign of 1748; Russo-Swedish War; Seven Years' War; Battle of Gross-Jägersdorf; Third Silesian War; Battle of Kunersdorf; Pomeranian War; Siege of Kolberg; Sixth Russo-Turkish War; Battle of Ryabaya Mogila; Battle of Larga; Battle of Kagul; Siege of Silistra (1773); Seventh Russo-Turkish War; Polish Campaign of 1794

Count Pyotr Alexandrovich Rumyantsev-Zadunaisky (Note: His name Pyotr is also anglicized as Peter. The full name is also transliterated as Petr Aleksandrovich Rumiantsev-Zadunaysky. "Rumyantsov" in the Russian Biographical Dictionary.) (Russian: Пётр Алекса́ндрович Румя́нцев-Задуна́йский; (Note: Pre-1918 orthography: Петръ Александровичъ Румянцевъ-Задунайскій) 15 January [O.S. 4 January] 1725 – 19 December [O.S. 8 December] 1796) was one of the foremost Russian military commanders of the 18th century, widely considered to be one of Russia's greatest military leaders and is referred to as one of the greatest commanders in military history. As a commander, he is placed on par with Alexander Suvorov, to whom he was a mentor. Rumyantsev used mobile divisional squares for the first time in history as opposed to linear battle orders and initiated the formation of light (jaeger) battalions in the Russian Army, which operated in a scattered order.

He governed Little Russia in the name of Empress Catherine the Great from the abolition of the Cossack Hetmanate in 1764 until Catherine's death 32 years later. Monuments to his victories include the Kagul Obelisk in Tsarskoye Selo (1772), the Rumyantsev Obelisk on Vasilievsky Island (1798–1801), and a galaxy of Derzhavin's odes.

== Early life ==
Pyotr came from the Russian noble Rumyantsev family. He was the only son of Count Alexander Rumyantsev, and was born in the village of Stroiești (modern Moldova/Transnistria), by Maria, the daughter and heiress of Count Andrey Matveyev. According to other versions, he was born in Moscow, and the Moldovan version of the birth is called legendary. As his mother spent much time in the company of Peter the Great, rumours suggested that the young Rumyantsev was the monarch's illegitimate son. He was named after the ruling Emperor who was his godfather. He was the brother of Praskovya Bruce, confidant of Catherine the Great.

Pyotr Alexandrovich first saw military service under his nominal father in the war with Sweden (1741–1743). He personally carried to the Empress the peace treaty of Åbo, concluded by his father in 1743. Thereupon he gained promotion to the rank of colonel.

His first military glory dates from the great battles of the Seven Years' War (1756–1763), those of Gross-Jägersdorf (1757) and Kunersdorf (1759). In 1761 he besieged and took the Pomeranian fortress of Kolberg, which had twice been unsuccessfully beleaguered by other Russia's commanders; thus clearing for Russian armies the path to Berlin. The siege of Kolberg of 1761 was an important milestone in the development of Russian military art. Here Rumyantsev pioneered a new tactic – the action of troops in battalion (regimental) columns, combined with a scattered formation of jaegers.

== First Russo-Turkish War ==
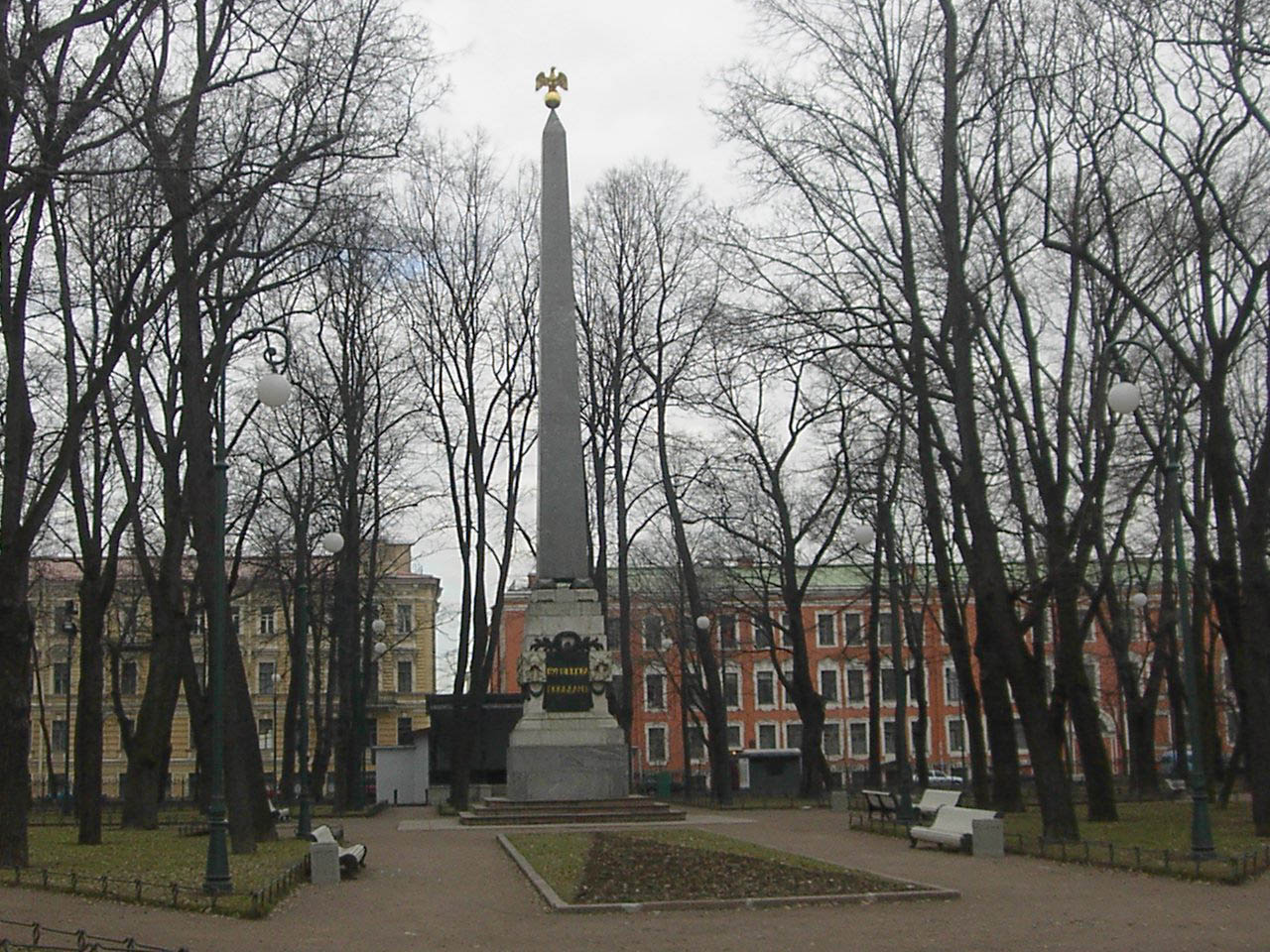
The Rumyantsev Obelisk (1799–1801) was moved from the Field of Mars to St. Andrew's Cathedral by Carlo Rossi in 1818.

Throughout the reign of Catherine the Great, Rumyantsev served as supreme governor of Little Russia. In this post, which his father had held with so much honesty, Rumyantsev made it his priority to eliminate any autonomy of the hetmans and to fully incorporate the newly conquered territories into the Russian Empire. Some accuse him of having promoted serfdom in New Russia, but the choice of such a policy remained out of his control.

With the outbreak of the Russo-Turkish war in 1768, Rumyantsev took command of the army sent to capture Azov. He thoroughly defeated the Turks in the battles of Ryabaya Mogila, Larga, and Kagul, crossed the Danube and advanced to Romania. For these dazzling victories he became Field-Marshal and gained the victory title Zadunaisky (meaning "Trans-Danubian"). When his forces approached Shumla in 1774, the new Sultan Abdul Hamid I started to panic and sued for peace, which Rumyanstev signed upon a military tambourine at the village of Küçük Kaynarca.

== Second Russo-Turkish War ==
By that point, Rumyantsev had undoubtedly become the most famous Russian commander. Other Catharinian generals, notably Potemkin, allegedly regarded his fame with such jealousy that they wouldn't permit him to take the command again. In times of peace, Rumyantsev expressed his innovative views on the martial art in the Instructions (1761), Customs of Military Service (1770), and the Thoughts (1777). These works provided a theoretical base for the re-organisation of the Russian army undertaken by Potemkin.

During the Second Russo-Turkish War, Rumyantsev suspected Potemkin of deliberately curtailing supplies of his army and presently resigned his command. In the Polish campaign of 1794 he once again won appointment as commander-in-chief, but his rival Suvorov actually led the armies into battle. On this occasion Rumyantsev didn't bother even to leave his Ukrainian manor at Tashan which he had rebuilt into a fortress. He died there on 19 December 1796, just over a month after Catherine's death, and was interred in the Kiev Pechersk Lavra.

As the story goes, old Rumyantsev-Zadunaisky grew enormously fat and avaricious, so that he pretended not to recognize his own sons when they came from the capital to ask for money. Under his son Sergey's administration, Tashan fell into ruins, although he erected a mausoleum near Balashikha for his father's reburial (which never took place). Neither Sergey nor his brother Nikolay Petrovich Rumyantsev married, and the comital branch of the Rumyantsev family became extinct upon their death.

== Honours ==
Blessed is he who, striving for glory
Preserved the common good
He was merciful in bloody war
And spared even the lives of enemies;
Blessed among the later ages
May this man be a friend of humanity.
Gavrila Derzhavin, "Waterfall"

Rumyantsev was presented with the following awards:

- Order of St. Alexander Nevsky (1759);
- Order of St. Andrew (1762);
- Order of St. George 1st Class (1770);
- Order of St. Vladimir 1st Class (1782);
- Golden Weapon for Bravery (1775, 1791/92).

== Gallery ==
Portraits:
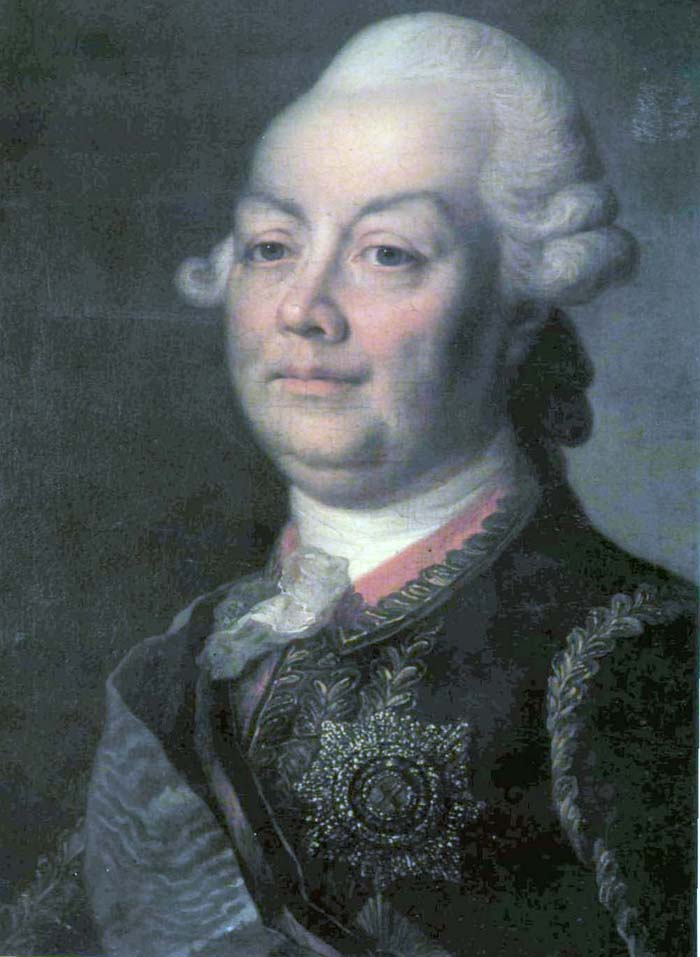
Portrait of Field Marshal Pyotr Rumyantsev-Zadunaisky. (Note: The portrait shows Rumyantsev in a fieldmarshal's uniform with gold embroidery on the collar, sides, and sleeves. Ribbons of the Orders of St. Andrew and St. George 1st Class are worn over the caftan. On the chest of the Field Marshal are embroidered stars of these awards.) Unknown artist of the late 18th century.

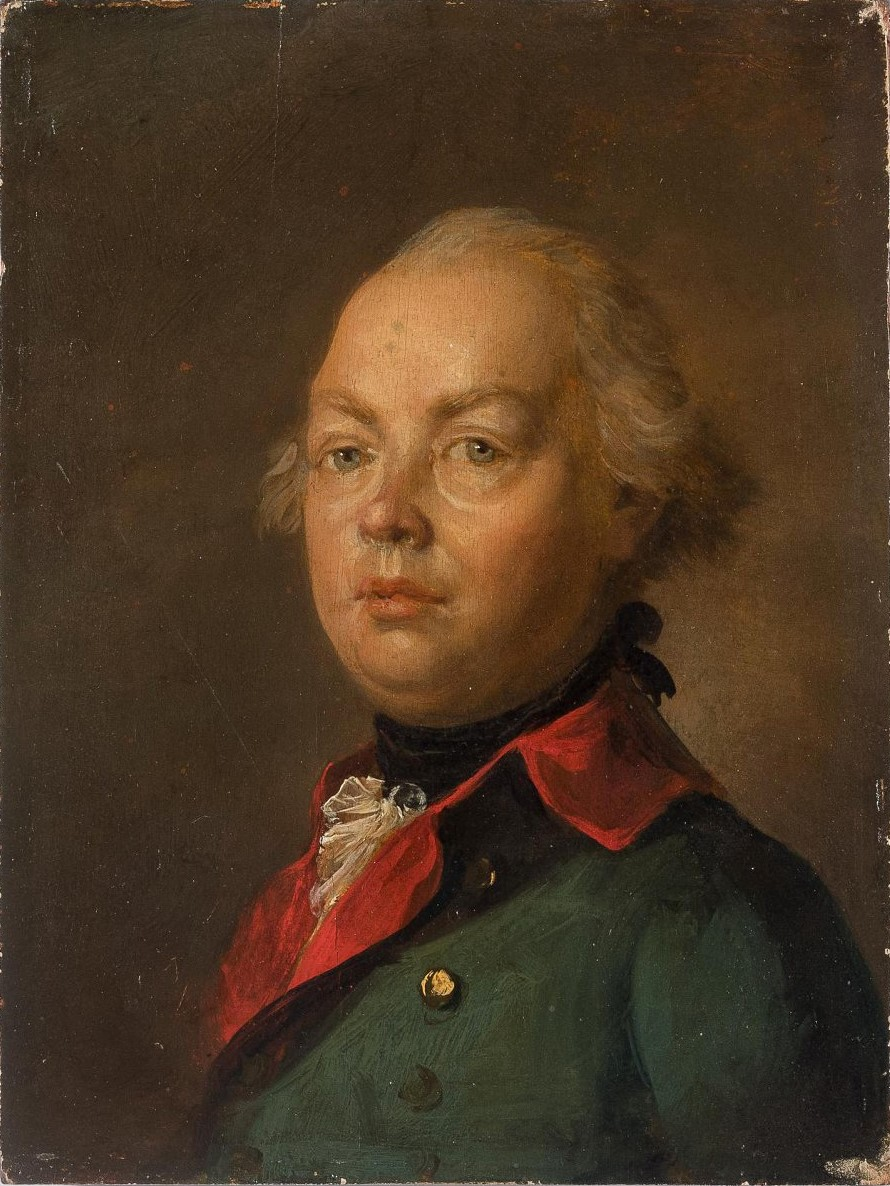
Portrait of Count Pyotr Alexandrovich Rumyantsev-Zadunaisky. Painting of the 1790s by Salvatore Tonci.

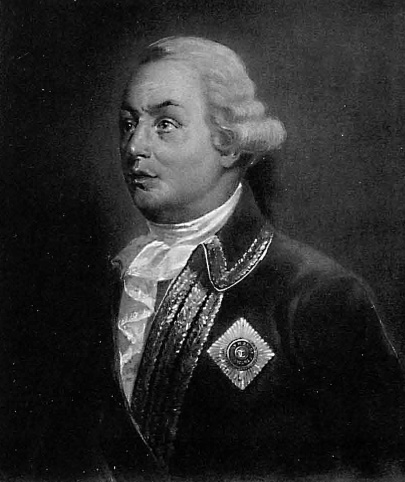
Pyotr Alexandrovich Rumyantsev, 18th century, unknown author
Related architecture:
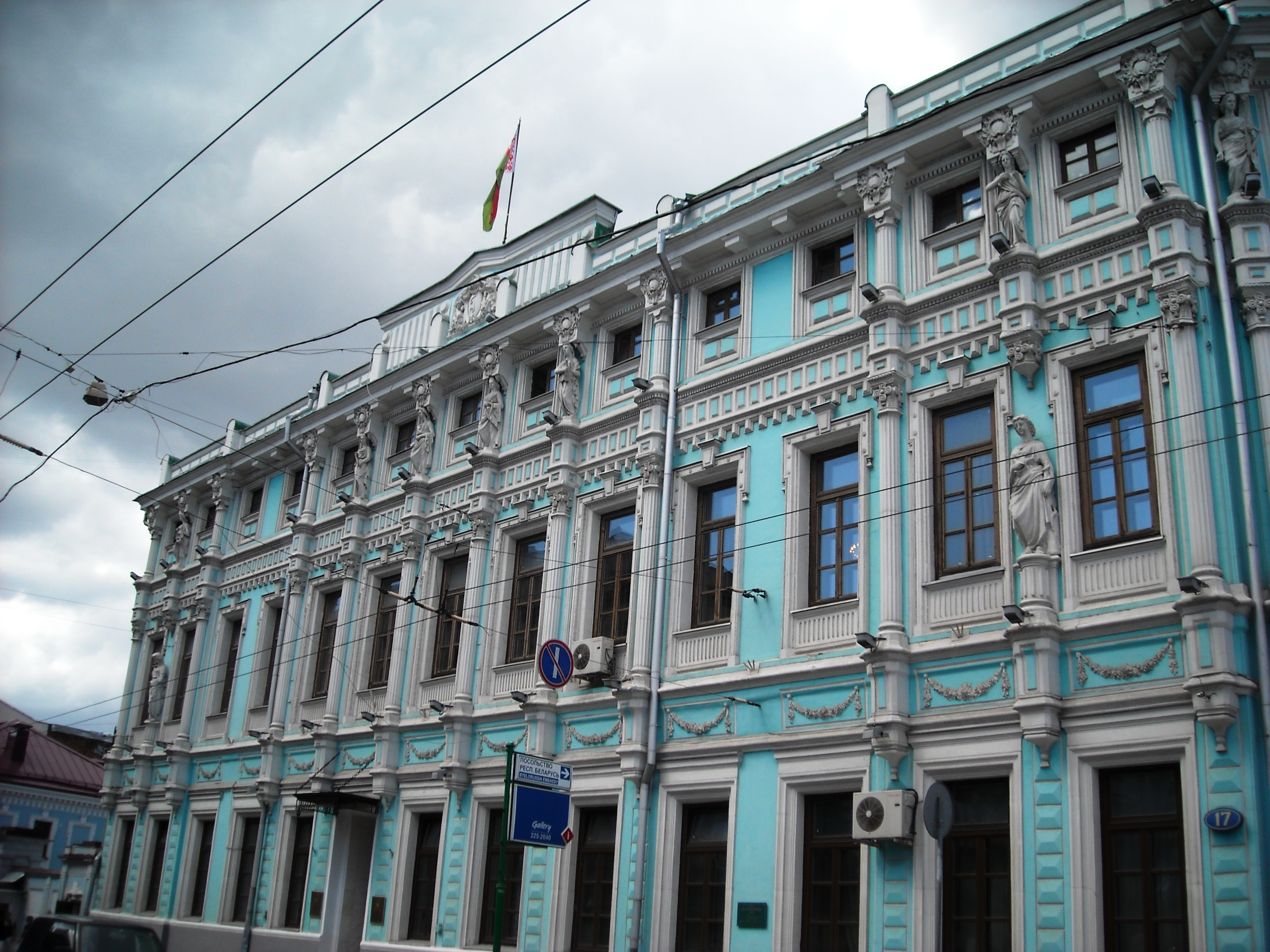
Rumyantsev Zadunaysky Mansion, built in 1782. (Note: A number of researchers called the famous architect of the project Vasily Bazhenov, others attribute the construction to M. F. Kazakov. There is no consensus on the issue; it is possible that both the architects were involved in the project.)

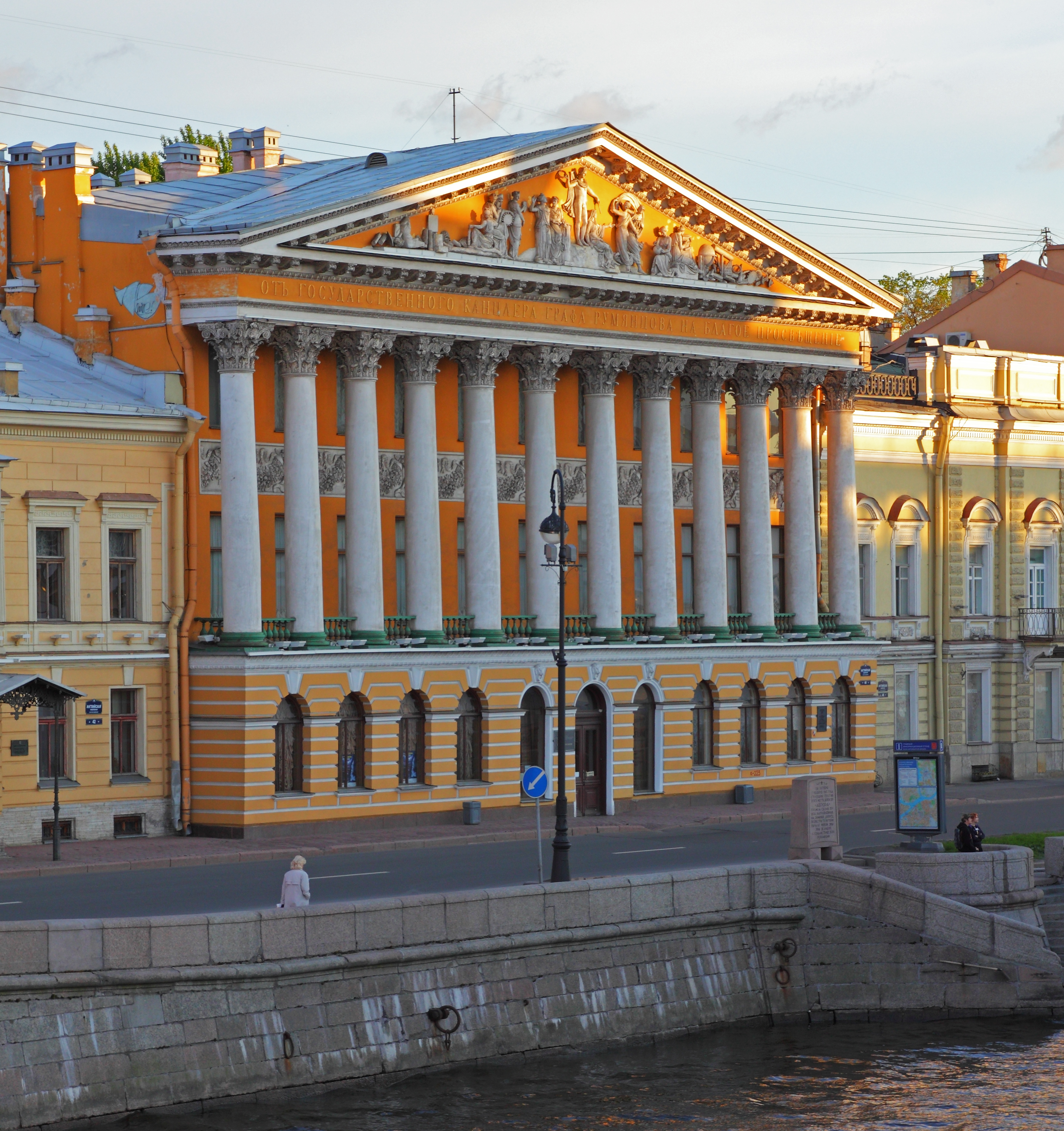
Nikolai Rumyantsev's mansion on English Quay, St. Petersburg

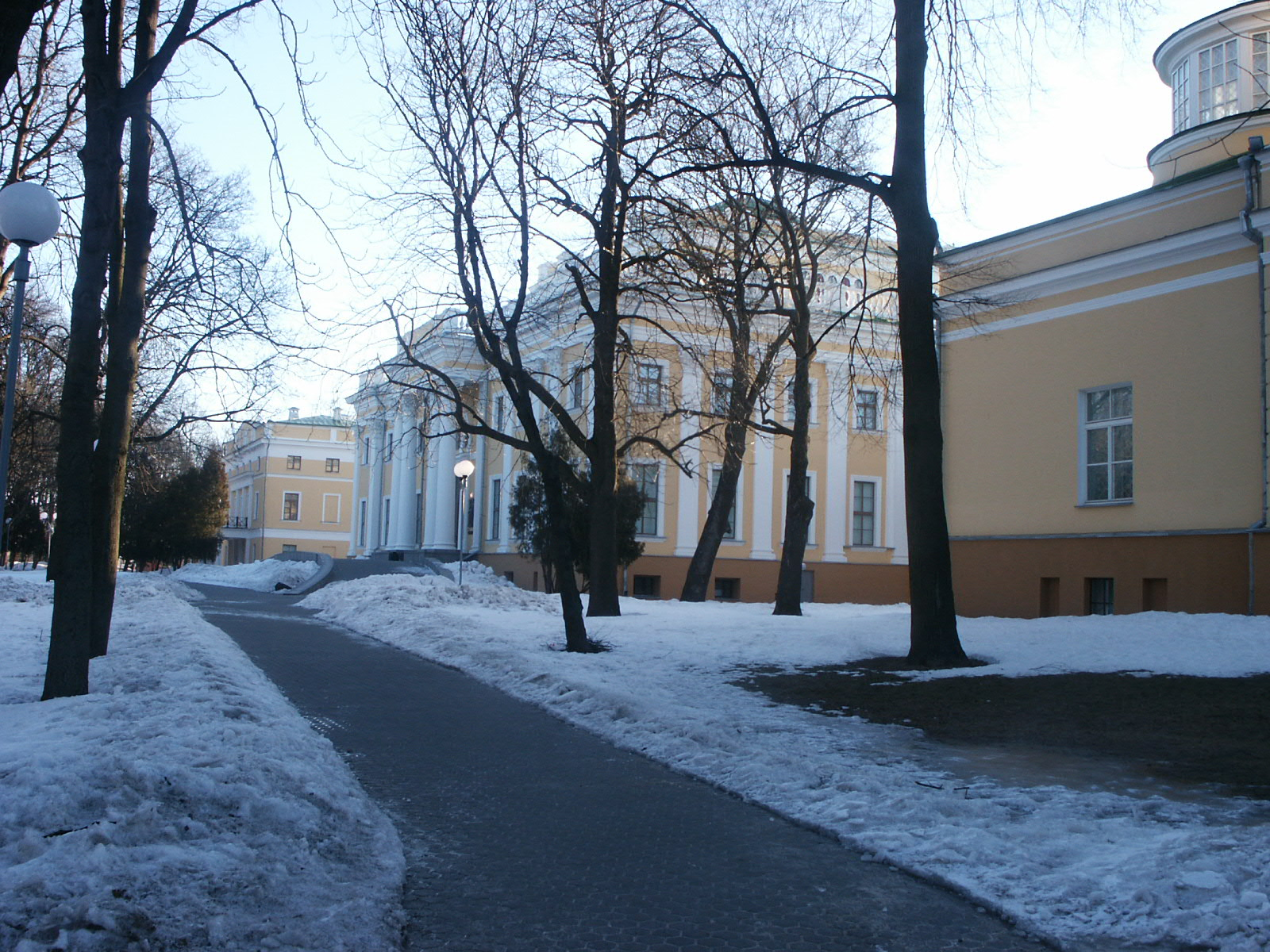
Rumyantsev Residence in Gomel, Belarus

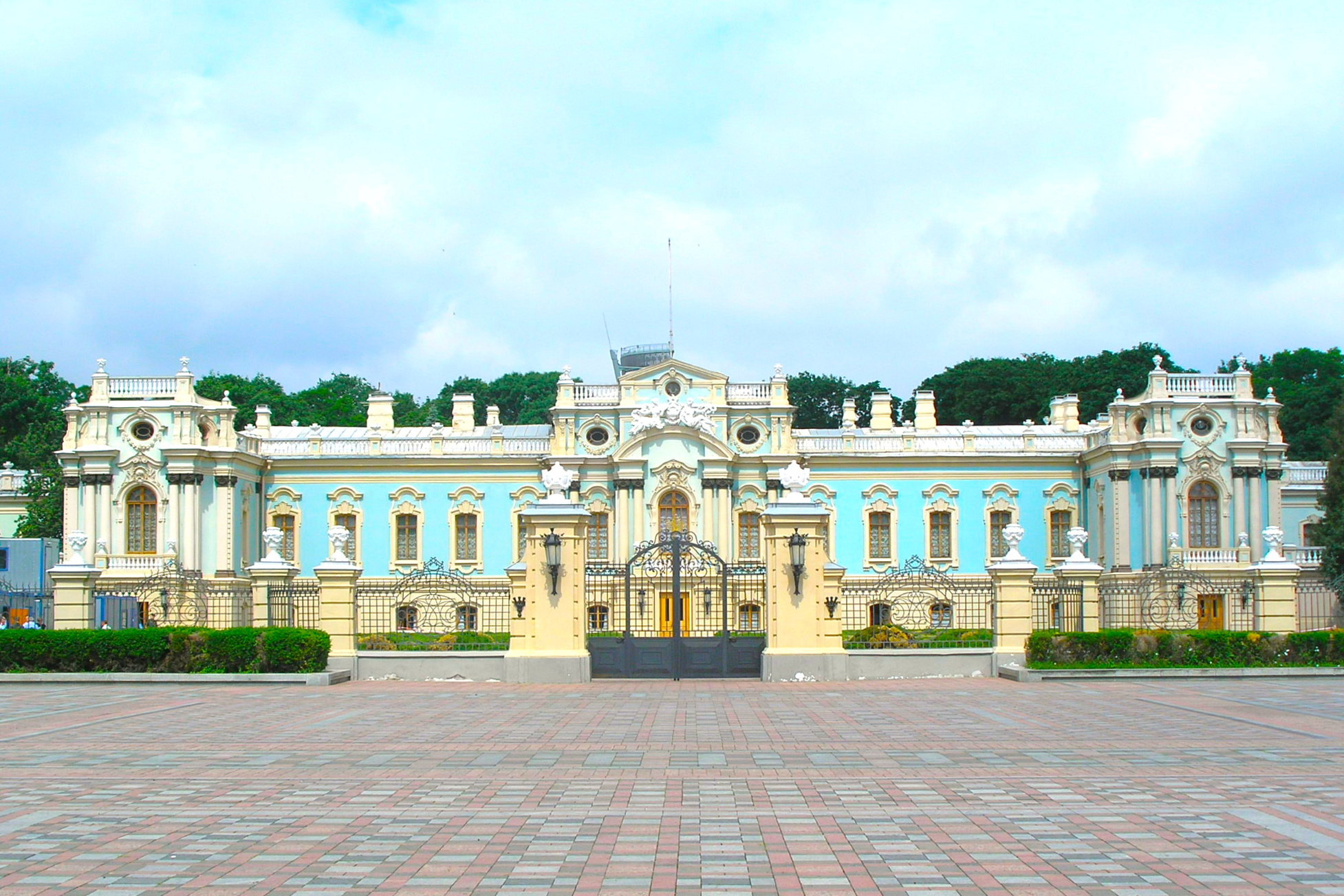
Governors' Palace in Kyiv

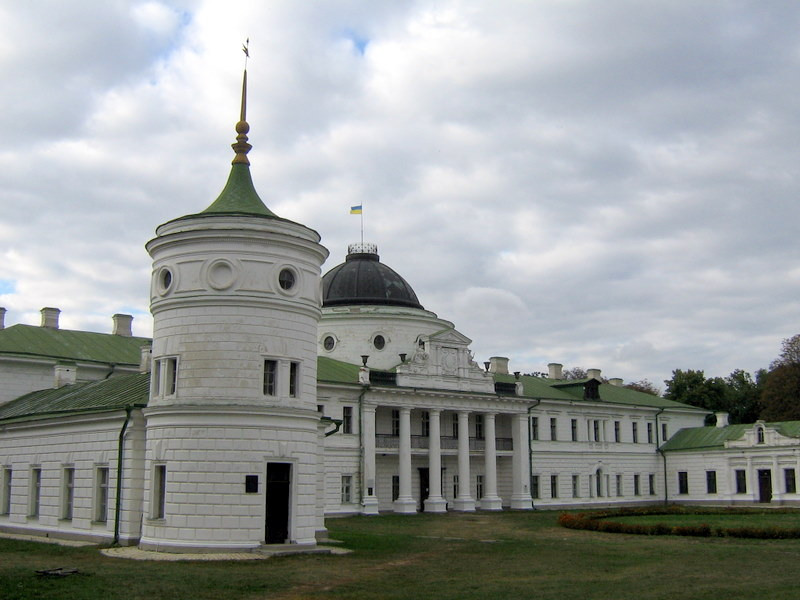
Kachanivka Palace, Ukraine

== Legacy ==
The village of Rumeanțev, Cahul, Moldova, is named in honour of Rumyantsev. The settlement is located 150 kilometres (93 mi) from Chișinău. It was first mentioned in documents in 1878 as Badicul Rusesc. In 1977, the authorities changed the name of the village. According to the 2004 census, the village's population was 457 people.

== See also ==
- Operation Polkovodets Rumyantsev

== Sources ==
- Bodart, Gaston (1908). Militär-historisches Kriegs-Lexikon (1618-1905) (in German). Vienna and Leipzig: C. W. Stern.
- Korobkov, Nikolay Mikhailovich (1947). Фельдмаршал Румянцев [Field Marshal Rumyantsev] (in Russian). Moscow: Политгиз.
- Meerovich, Grigory Ilyich (1987). Румянцев в Петербурге [Rumyantsev in Petersburg] (in Russian). Leningrad: Лениздат.
- Andrunakievich, Vladimir Aleksandrovich; Vartichan, Iosif Konstantinovich (1982). Советская Молдавия: краткая энциклопедия [Soviet Moldavia: short encyclopedia] (in Russian). Kishinev: Глав. ред. Молдавской Сов. энциклопедии.
- Tashlykov, S. L. (2016). "КОЛЬБЕРГА ОСАДЫ". Great Russian Encyclopedia. Electronic version.
  - Kuzmin, A. V. (2017). "РУМЯНЦЕВЫ". Great Russian Encyclopedia. Electronic version.

Government offices
Preceded by Kyrylo Rozumovsky as Hetman of Zaporizhian Host	Governor-General of Little Russia; 1764–1781	Succeeded by himself as General Governor of Kiev, Chernigov and Novgorod-Siversky
Preceded by himself as General Governor of Little Russia	General Governor of Kiev, Chernigov, Novgorod-Siversky; 1782–1796	Succeeded by Sergey Vyazmitinov as General Governor of Little Russia (Kamenets-Podolsky)
Preceded by himself as General Governor of Little Russia	General Governor of Kiev, Chernigov, Novgorod-Siversky; 1782–1796	Succeeded by Ivan Saltykov as General Governor of Kiev
