= Zoya Shabarova =

Russian bioorganic chemist

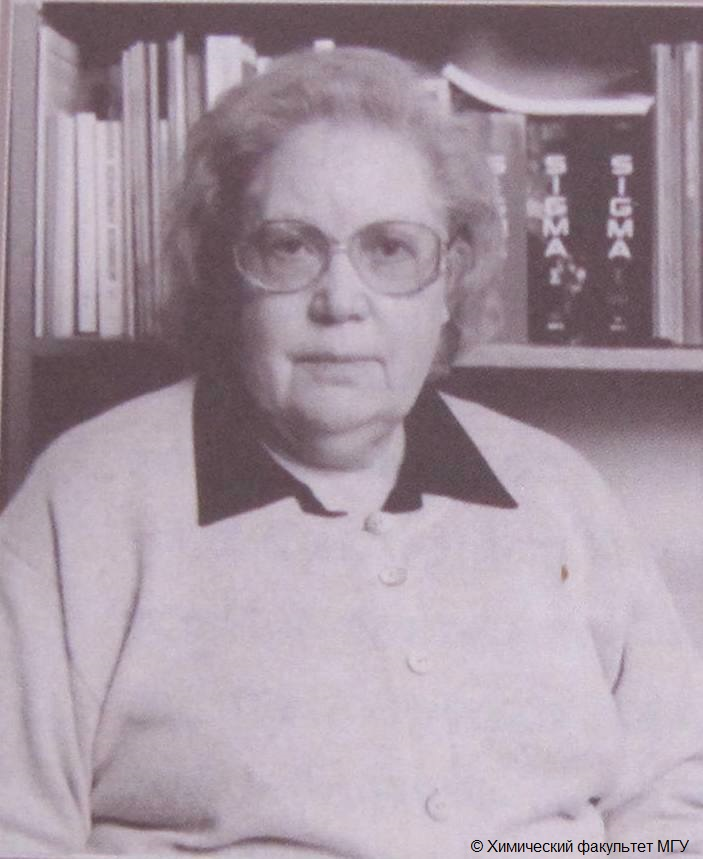
- Born: 15 August 1925; Staritsa, USSR
- Died: 19 September 1999 (aged 74); Moscow, Russia
- Education: Moscow State University
- Awards: Jubilee Medal "In Commemoration of the 100th Anniversary of the Birth of Vladimir Ilyich Lenin" (1970); USSR State Prize for the cycle of works "Reverse transcriptase (revertase)" (1979); Jubilee badge "225 years of MSU" (1980); Medal "Veteran of Labor" (1984); Prize of the Ministry of Higher Education of the USSR for work on the creation of a solid-phase method for the synthesis of gene fragments and the development of a domestic automatic gene synthesizer "Victoria" (1980, 1982, 1986); Lenin Prize together with D. G. Knorre, R. I. Salganik, N. I. Grineva (1990) for a series of works "Creating the foundations of targeted modification of genetic structures" (1990); Honorary title of "Distinguished Professor of Moscow State University" (1996)
- Scientific career
- Fields: Bioorganic chemistry
- Workplaces: Moscow State University
- Doctoral advisor: M.A. Prokofiev

Zoya Alekseyevna Shabarova (Russian: Зоя Алексеевна Шабарова; also Zoe Shabarova; 15 August 1925 – 19 September 1999) was a Soviet organic chemist and Honored Professor of Lomonosov Moscow State University. Her work became fundamental for the development of the theoretical principles of bioorganic chemistry, especially in the area of chemistry of nucleic acids, their properties and synthesis.

== Early years ==
Zoya (maiden surname is Rumyantseva) was brought up in the Tver Oblast. She was the eldest of two sisters. In 1941, Third Reich troops invaded the Soviet Union, so the Rumyantsev family was evacuated to Uzbekistan; they returned home in September 1943. Her father was killed during the war while fighting in Smolensk. While living in Uzbekistan, Rumyantseva got her secondary education at a local school. In 1943 she entered the Chemistry Department of Lomonosov Moscow State University.

Rumyantseva attended lectures on bioorganic chemistry by such influential academicians of Moscow State University as M.M. Botvinik and N.I. Gavrilov. In the late 1940s she joined the scientific group of the famous later Soviet organic chemist M.A. Prokofiev. She graduated in 1948, and continued her research work as a graduate student in Prokofiev's laboratory.

== Scientific achievements ==
Shabarova began her research activity as a member of Prof. Prokofiev's scientific group. Her first study dealt with the structure and chemical properties of nucleopeptides found among the hydrolysis products of natural nucleic acids. This pioneering research was a foundation of modern molecular biology.

Shabarova discovered the chemical properties of the simple model compounds, such as aminopyrimidines, pyrimidylaminoacids and aminoacyl derivatives of pyrimidines. She subsequently studied the aminoacid derivatives of nucleotides (O- and N-types).

In 1951, Shabarova upheld her thesis on the topic "Synthesis and properties of pyrimidylaminoacids and pyrimidyl-(puryl-)-amides of amino acids and peptides". In 1965, she presented her doctoral dissertation on "Research in the field of phosphoamide-type nucleotidopeptides".

While studying compounds consisted of protein or peptide and nucleotide fragments, she discovered a reaction which allows researchers to determine the type of bond in natural nucleoproteins. Due to this research, the mechanism of DNA and RNA ligases' catalysis was established.

In the 1960s, Shabarova started research on the synthesis of oligonucleotides, focusing on the opportunity of solid-phase synthesis. Together with Dr. V.K. Potapov, she continued their study in this new field. In the late 1970s they successfully finished (together with D.G. Knorre), resulting in the development of one's of the world's first automatic synthesizers of oligonucleotides, which they dubbed "Victoria”.

The works, in which Zoya Shabarova with her apprentices developed reactions occurring in supramolecular complexes of biopolymers, received worldwide acknowledgment. They dealt with ultrafast matrix-dependent assembling of genetic structures, obtaining small single-stranded DNA fragments, directional modification of sugar-phosphate backbone, including opportunity to specific cleavage of phosphodiester bonds, modifying DNA-duplexes to be able to form covalent bonds with DNA-recognizing proteins without external exposure. After inventing an automatic synthesizer of oligonucleotides, chemical ligation of synthetic DNA blocks was elaborated. Shabarova’s technic was being used to synthesize modified DNA, which are resistant to the action of enzymes. These studies allowed further supplying the Russian scientific institutes with oligonucleotides with a particular sequence and appropriate modifications. Moreover, research in this area contributed to the development of "protein traps", gene expression modulators, antivirals, antitumors and other drugs based on modified nucleic acids. The unique approach to design DNA-based substrates and inhibitors allowed to scrutinize enzymes' active sites.

Furthermore, methods for activating oligonucleotides in aqueous media to construct nonradioactive probes for medicine diagnostics had been also discovered. In addition, approaches to change the rate of protein synthesis in living systems by injecting specific oligonucleotides had been elaborated, too.

Shabarova also studied the chemical foundations of the construction of recombinant RNAs, including region-specific cleavage of the RNA chain and chemical ligation of fragments on a complementary matrix. Along with it, revertase protein explored in 1970, which is able to synthesize DNA on the RNA matrix from any given position, was investigated. Due to this study, an idea of the life cycle of some viruses was conceived (marked with USSR State Prize for the cycle of works, 1979). Together with D.G. Knorre, R.I. Salganik, N.I. Grineva, she was awarded the Lenin Prize of the USSR (1990) for the cycle of works "Creating the foundations of targeted modification of genetic structures".

== Organizational life ==
Shabarova had active social and scientific-organizational life. Starting in 1966 she was the head of the Laboratory of Nucleic Acid Chemistry of the Belozersky Research Institute of Physical and Chemical Biology, and starting in 1970 she was a professor at the Division of Chemistry of Natural Compounds of the Chemistry Department of Moscow State University. In 1966 she became deputy chairman of the specialized Council for the defense of doctoral dissertations at Moscow State University. Shabarova was also a member of the Scientific Council of the Moscow State University Belozersky Research Institute of Physical and Chemical Biology (1968) and Shemyakin-Ovchinnikov Institute of Bioorganic Chemistry, RAS (IBCh RAS) (1980), a member of the International Scientific Society "Chemistry of Nucleic Acids" (IBCh RAS) (1989) and an Honored Soros Professor, member of the editorial boards of international journals.

Shabarova taught graduate students and students engaged in the Department of the Division of Chemistry of Natural Compounds. She also gave lectures on the chemistry of nucleic acids at the Chemistry Department of Moscow State University. Her book, Chemistry of nucleic acids and their Components, written in collaboration with A.A. Bogdanov in 1978, is still the only textbook that outlines the chemical properties of DNA and RNA, methods of synthesis of oligonucleotides, and the chemical foundations of genetic engineering. An expanded edition, translated into English, was published in Germany in 1994 and received admiring reviews. She also gave a course of lectures on bioorganic chemistry at foreign universities in countries such as the USA, England, France, Germany, Japan, and Italy.

In 1965-1999 she was the head of the Laboratory of Nucleic Acids Chemistry of the Chemistry of Natural Compounds Department.

During her career, Shabarova prepared about 70 Candidates of Sciences, who went on to work in leading laboratories all over the world. One of her apprentices, Benediktas Iodka, was a Head of the Lithuanian Academy of Sciences.

Shabarova wrote approximately 500 scientific papers, published both in Soviet and world authoritative scientific journals. She also had 7 patents.

== Legacy ==
Shabarova was buried at the Aksininsky cemetery (Odintsovo city district of the Moscow region).

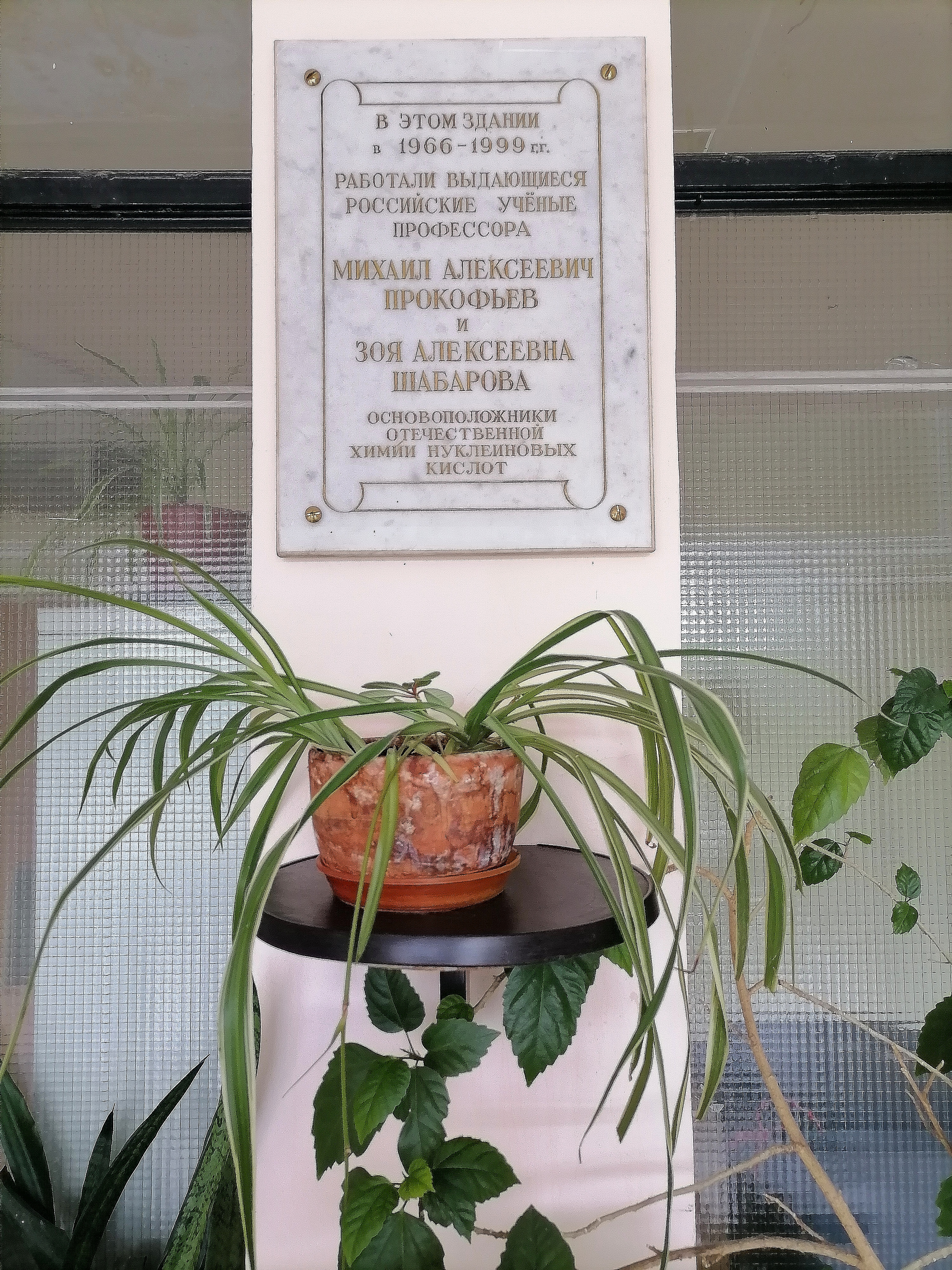
Memorial plaque in the Belozersky Research Institute of Physical and Chemical Biology of Moscow State University

In 2000 a memorial plaque with her name was opened in the Belozersky Research Institute of Physical and Chemical Biology of Moscow State University.

== Awards ==
- Jubilee Medal "In Commemoration of the 100th Anniversary of the Birth of Vladimir Ilyich Lenin" (1970)
- USSR State Prize for the cycle of works "Reverse transcriptase (revertase)" (1979)
- Jubilee badge "225 years of MSU" (1980)
- Medal "Veteran of Labor" (1984)
- Prize of the Ministry of Higher Education of the USSR for work on the creation of a solid-phase method for the synthesis of gene fragments and the development of a domestic automatic gene synthesizer "Victoria" (1980, 1982, 1986)
- Lenin Prize together with D. G. Knorre, R. I. Salganik, N. I. Grineva (1990) for a series of works "Creating the foundations of targeted modification of genetic structures" (1990)
- Honorary title of "Distinguished Professor of Moscow State University" (1996)

== Personal life ==
Zoya Rumyantseva married Yuri Sergeevich Shabarov (1919-2005) in 1950. Shabarov was a famous chemist and a professor of the Chemistry Department of Moscow State University. They had a son, Alexey Yuryevich Shabarov, in 1953. He graduated from Moscow State University, Candidate of Physical and Mathematical Sciences. He worked at the on Computational Mathematics and Cybernetics Department of Moscow State University, and later became an employee of Research Institute of Technical Physics and Automation.

== Books ==
- Shabarova Z.A., Bogdanov A.A. Himiya nukleinovyh kislot i ih komponentov. M.: Himiya, 1978, 582 s.
- Zoe Shabarova, Alexey Bogdanov. Advanced Organic Chemistry of Nucleic Acids. — Weinheim: VCH, 1994. — 588 S. — ISBN 3527290214.
- Shabarova Z.A., Bogdanov A.A., Zolotuhin A.S. Himicheskie osnovy geneticheskoj inzhenerii. M.: MGU, 1994, 224 s.
