= Rumyantsev =

Russian noble family

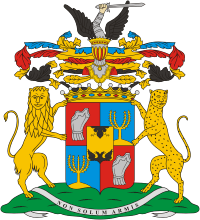
Coat of arms of Counts Rumyantsev

The Rumyantsev family (Russian: Румянцевы, romanized: Rumyantsevy) was an old and prominent Russian noble family, whose members were involved in imperial politics in the 18th and early 19th century. They were granted the title of Count in Russia.

== History ==
The family claimed descent from the boyar Rumyanets who broke his oath of allegiance and surrendered Nizhny Novgorod to Vasily I of Moscow in 1391.

The first Rumyantsev to gain prominence, Alexander Ivanovich (1680–1749), served as orderly of Peter the Great in the Preobrazhensky regiment. In 1720, he married Countess Maria Matveyeva, daughter and heiress of Count Andrey Matveyev. Peter's daughter Elizabeth recalled Rumyantsev to active service and made him a hereditary count as well as Governor of Kiev.

Alexander and Maria's son, Pyotr Alexandrovich (1725–1796), took his name ("Peter" in Russian) from that of the ruling Emperor, whose biological son he was rumored to be. In 1761, Pyotr besieged and took the Prussian fortress of Kolberg, thus clearing the path to Berlin for the Russian armies. During Catherine II's reign, he served as Governor General of Little Russia, which was Ukraine. After crossing the Danube River into Bulgaria and signing the advantageous Treaty of Küçük Kaynarca with the Turks in 1774, Rumyantsev was promoted to Field Marshal and given the victory title of Zadunaisky (literally, "Transdanubian").

Pyotr's sister, Praskovja Bruce (1729–1785), was the confidant and lady-in-waiting of Catherine the Great, who entrusted her with her private affairs. She thus became known in history as l'éprouveuse ("the [lovers'] tester").

During the Napoleonic Wars, Pyotr Rumyantsev's son, Nikolay Petrovich (1754–1826), held the highest offices of the Russian state, including those of Minister of Commerce (1802–1811), President of the State Council (1810–1812), Foreign Minister (1808–1812), and Chancellor of the Russian Empire. On receiving the news of Napoleon's invasion of Russia (1812), he suffered a stroke and lost his hearing. He died childless, and the family became extinct soon thereafter. Nikolay Petrovich founded the Rumyantsev Museum, bestowing to it his art collection. It was dissolved in 1924 by the new, revolutionary regime.

== Claims of family membership ==
French general Nicolas Roumiantzeff claimed in his biography to be a descendant of Pyotr Rumyantsev.
