= Diplomatic Privileges Act 1708 =

Act of the Parliament of Great Britain

Diplomatic Privileges Act 1708 (Note: The citation of this act by this short title was authorised by section 1 of, and the first schedule to, the Short Titles Act 1896. Due to the repeal of those provisions it is now authorised by section 19(2) of the Interpretation Act 1978.)
- Act of Parliament
- Parliament of Great Britain
- Long title: An Act for preserving the Privileges of Ambassadors and other publick Ministers of Foreign Princes and States. (Note: These words are printed against this act in the second column of the first schedule to the Short Titles Act 1896, which is headed "Title".)
- Citation: 7 Ann. c. 12
- Territorial extent: Great Britain

Dates
- Royal assent: 21 April 1709
- Commencement: 16 November 1708 (Note: Start of session.)
- Repealed: 1 October 1964 (Note: The Diplomatic Privileges Act 1964 (Commencement) Order 1964.)

Other legislation
- Amended by: Statute Law Revision Act 1867; Statute Law Revision Act 1887; Statute Law Revision Act 1888
- Repealed by: Diplomatic Privileges Act 1964

Status: Repealed

Text of statute as originally enacted

The Diplomatic Privileges Act 1708 (7 Ann. c. 12) was an act of the Parliament of Great Britain. It is also known as the Act of Anne or the Statute of Anne. It should not be confused with the Copyright Act 1710 (8 Ann. c. 21), also known as the Statute of Anne.

== Background ==
The act was passed as result of an incident in 1708 when the Russian Ambassador, Andrey Matveyev, was arrested and imprisoned by London bailiffs acting on behalf of his creditors. Matveyev was freed on bail, then left the country without presenting his letters of recall. To appease Peter the Great, the act was passed, putting diplomatic immunity in Britain on a statutory basis for the first time.

== Provisions ==
The act provided for the nullity of all civil proceedings against ambassadors and their servants. It also provides that all those who institute such proceedings or attempt to enforce them shall "be deemed violators of the laws of nations" and be punished accordingly.

The act was said to be declaratory of the common law, although this has been doubted by later authorities.

== Subsequent developments ==
Sections 1 and 2 of the act were repealed by section 1 of, and the schedule to, the Statute Law Revision Act 1867 (30 & 31 Vict. c. 59), which came into force on 15 July 1867.

Section 6 of the act, to "pleading and", was repealed by section 1 of, and the schedule to, the Statute Law Revision Act 1887 (50 & 51 Vict. c. 59), which came into force on 16 September 1887.

The whole act was repealed by section 8(4) of, and schedule 2 to, the Diplomatic Privileges Act 1964 (c. 81). It may be still in force in some Commonwealth jurisdictions.
