= Ribosomal tunnel =

Cross-section of a bacterial ribosome with a marked ribosomal tunnel, several ribosomal proteins and transfer RNA.

The ribosomal tunnel, or peptide tunnel, is a part of the ribosome that holds the nascent polypeptide chain during translation. The ribosomal tunnel is located in the large subunit of the ribosome and connects the catalytic site of the ribosome with its surface.

== History ==
The existence of the ribosomal tunnel became apparent in the 1960s. When the nascent protein was exposed to hydrolytic enzymes, part of the protein was protected from hydrolysis, supporting the hypothesis of the existence of a tunnel that shields part of the protein. The tunnel was then identified in the large subunit of the ribosome by cryogenic electron microscopy. Crucial information about the existence of the tunnel was provided by atomically resolved structures of the large ribosomal subunit determined by X-ray crystallography by the research group of Thomas Steitz. In 2009, Thomas Steitz, along with A. Yonath and V. Ramakrishnan, received the Nobel Prize in Chemistry for their research on the ribosome.

The initial view that the tunnel is merely an inert environment through which the nascent polypeptide exits the ribosome has been abandoned based on numerous studies. Today, it is believed that the tunnel is actively involved in regulating translation and maintaining homeostasis.

== Tunnel structure ==
Schematic of the ribosomal tunnel with ribosomal proteins, peptidyl transferase center (PTC) and constriction site (CS) marked.

The shape of the ribosomal tunnel is irregular, and its size varies depending on the organism and cell type. Ribosomal tunnels in bacteria are generally longer and wider than those in the ribosomes of higher organisms. In bacteria, the tunnel length is approximately 9.2 nm, while in eukaryotes it is about 8.3 nm and the average radius of the ribosomal tunnel is on average 0.57 nm in bacteria and 0.51 nm in eukaryotes. The tunnel can accommodate a polypeptide consisting of around 40 to 60 amino acid residues.

The tunnel walls are composed of rRNA and several ribosomal proteins. The tunnel is filled with water and ions, while small molecules such as ornithine may diffuse into it. The tunnel contains a constriction formed by loops of ribosomal proteins uL4 and uL22, which divide the tunnel space into an inner and an outer part (sometimes also referred to as the upper and lower parts). The inner portion near the catalytic site is approximately 3.5 nm long and accommodates a nascent polypeptide of 12 to 16 amino acid residues. There is a second constriction in the ribosomes of some eukaryotes that has implications for the regulation of short peptide synthesis.

The outer part of the tunnel widens toward its opening and forms the so-called vestibule. The opening of the tunnel is flanked by the ribosomal proteins uL23, uL24, uL29 and uL32. In eukaryotes, also uL35, uL39e, or uL25. Ribosome-associated protein biogenesis factors such as the trigger factor or peptide deformylase bind to their vicinity.

== Effect on Proteosynthesis ==
The process of synthesizing of the nascent polypeptide chain can be divided into three stages.

As the nascent polypeptide elongates during proteosynthesis, it passes through the ribosomal tunnel, interacting with the tunnel walls, thus regulating the rate at which it passes through the tunnel. This in turn affect the rate of partial folding, which may already occur at this stage. Short stretches of alpha-helix may form in the inner part of the tunnel and tertiary structure may start forming in the wider tunnel vestibule. As the N-terminus reaches the tunnel exit and is processed by the ribosome-associated protein biogenesis factors, the tertiary structure formed in the tunnel may partially refold. The folding is then completed when the C-terminus is released from the PTC and the protein escapes the tunnel.

== Interaction with Antibiotics ==
The ribosomal tunnel contains binding sites for clinically important antibiotics, such as macrolides or streptogramins. Antibiotics bind to the inner part of the ribosomal tunnel, either near the peptidyl transferase center or near the constriction site. Despite the original belief that macrolide binding to the tunnel causes obstruction, it has been shown that the tunnel remains permeable. Antibiotics instead stabilize the catalytic site of the ribosome in a conformation that is unproductive for peptide bond formation, causing translational arrest. Translational arrest of the ribosome may also be dependent on the sequence of the nascent peptide, as has been observed, for example with chloramphenicol.

== See also ==
- Ribosome
- Translation
- Translational arrest
- Ribosomal RNA
- Ribosomal protein
- Protein
