= Ortho effect =

Effect of spatial atomic arrangement on properties of compounds

Ortho effect is an organic chemistry phenomenon where the presence of a chemical group at the at ortho position or the 1 and 2 position of a phenyl ring, relative to the carboxylic compound changes the chemical properties of the compound. This is caused by steric effects and bonding interactions along with polar effects caused by the various substituents which are in a given molecule, resulting in changes in its chemical and physical properties. The ortho effect is associated with substituted benzene compounds.

There are three main ortho effects in substituted benzene compounds:

- Steric hindrance forces cause substitution of a chemical group in the ortho position of benzoic acids become stronger acids.
- Steric inhibition of protonation caused by substitution of anilines to become weaker bases, compared to substitution of isomers in the meta and para position.
- Electrophilic aromatic substitution of disubstituted benzene compounds causes steric effects which determines the regioselectivity of an incoming electrophile in disubstituted benzene compounds

== Ortho substituted benzoic acids ==
When a substituent group is located ortho position to the carboxyl group in a substituted benzoic acid compound, the compound becomes more acidic surpassing the unmodified benzoic acid.

Generally ortho-substituted benzoic acids are stronger acids than their meta and para isomers.

=== Mechanism of action ===
When ortho substitution occurs in benzoic acid, steric hindrance causes the carboxyl group to twist out of the plane of the benzene ring. The twisting inhibits the resonance of the carboxyl group with the phenyl ring, leading to increased acidity of the carboxyl group. This increased acidity contrasts with the reduced acidity caused by destabilizing cross-conjugation. The destabilizing cross-conjugation causes decreased acidity of benzoic acid compared to formic acid.

==== pKa values ====
The table given below shows pKa values of various monosubstituted benzoic acids.

Substituent	Position on ring			
Substituent	Ortho	Meta	Para	
Substituent	H	4.2	4.2	4.2
CH_{3}	3.9	4.3	4.4	
F	3.3	4.3	4.4	
Cl	2.9	3.8	4.0	
Br	2.8	3.8	4.0	
I	2.9	3.9	4.0	
OMe	4.1	4.1	4.5	
NO_{2}	2.2	3.5	3.4	
OH	2.98	4.08	4.58	

== Ortho substituted aniline ==
When any group is present at ortho position to an amine group (NH_{2}) in aniline then the basic character of that compound becomes weaker. For example, see the order of basicity of following substituted aniline:-

- p-Toluidine > m-Toluidine > Aniline > o-Toluidine
- Aniline > m-Nitroaniline > p-Nitroaniline > o-Nitroaniline
- Aniline > p-Haloaniline > m-Haloaniline > o-Haloaniline
- p-Aminophenol pKb=8.50 > o-Aminophenol pKb=9.28 > Aniline pKb=9.38 > m-Aminophenol pKb=9.80

The protonation of substituted aniline is inhibited by steric hindrance. When protonated, the nitrogen in the amino group changes its orbital hybridization from sp^{2} to sp^{3}, becoming non-planar. This leads to steric hindrance between the ortho-substituted group and the hydrogen atom of the amino group, reducing the stability of the conjugate acid and consequently decreasing the pH of substituted Aniline.

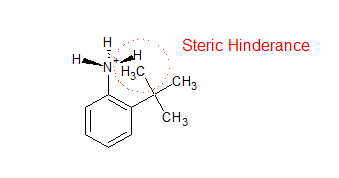
Steric Inhibition of Protonation

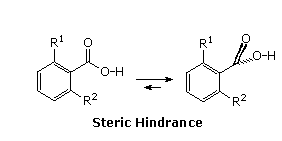
Steric hindrance in ortho substituted benzoic acid

== Electrophilic aromatic substitution of disubstituted benzene compounds ==
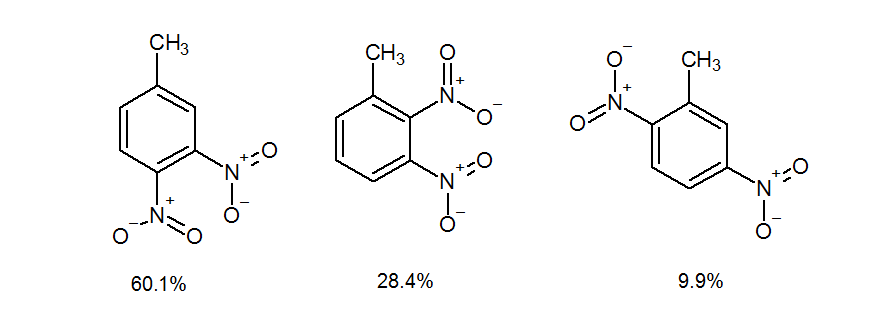
Nitration of m-Nitrotoluene

The ortho effect also occurs when a meta-directing group is positioned in a meta arrangement relative to an ortho–para-directing group, a new substituent introduced into the molecule tends to preferentially occupy the ortho position relative to the meta-directing group rather than the para position. Currently, there is no definitive explanation for the ortho effect, but it is hypothesized that there may be intramolecular assistance from the meta-directing group influencing the positioning of the incoming substituent. For example, the electrophilic aromatic nitration of 1-methyl-3-nitrobenzene affords 4-methyl-1,2-dinitrobenzene and 1-methyl-2,3-dinitrobenzene in 60.1% and 28.4% yields, respectively. In contrast, 2-methyl-1,4-dinitrobenzene (2c) is isolated in only 9.9% yield. As witnessed in the above example, when a π-acceptor substituent (πAS) is meta to a π-donor substituent (πDS), the electrophilic aromatic nitration occurs ortho to the πAS rather than para.

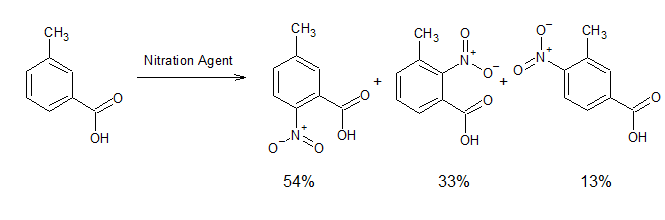
Nitration of 3-Methylbenzoic acid

Similar results were also observed on the nitration of 3-methylbenzoic acid in which 5-methyl-2-nitrobenzoic acid and 3-methyl-2-nitrobenzoic acid were obtained as the major compounds, whereas 3-methyl-4-nitrobenzoic acid was reported as a minor compound. Also in nitration of the nitration of 3-bromobenzoic acid 5-bromo-2-nitrobenzoic acid (83%yield) was obtained as major product and 3-bromo-2-nitrobenzoic acid (13% yield) as minor. On an interesting note the potential isomer 3-bromo-4-nitrobenzoic acid was not detected.

== Diels-Alder reactions ==
The ortho effect occurs in Diels-Alder reactions when the Z-substituted dienophiles react with 1-substituted butadienes to give 3,4-disubstituted cyclohexenes, independent of the nature of diene substituents.
