= MSU Faculty of Chemistry =

Chemical faculty of Moscow State University

Coordinates: 55.7022°N 37.5258°E

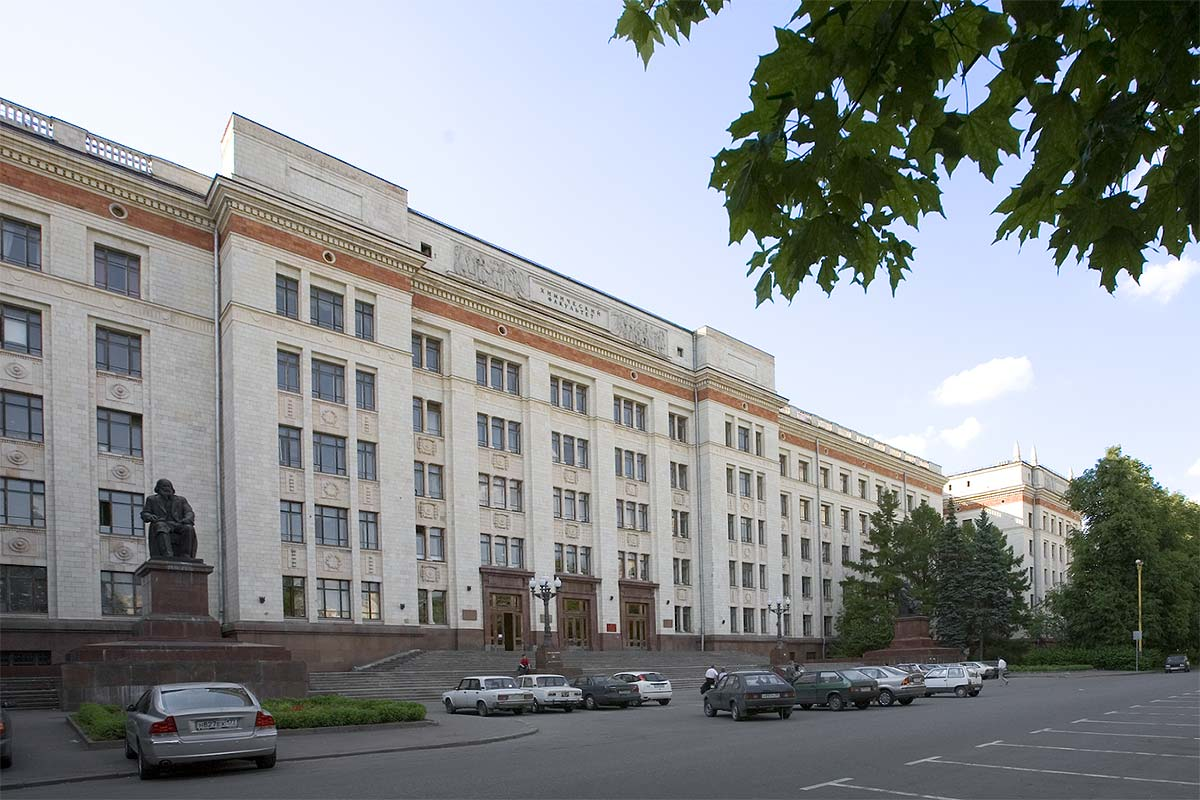
Chemistry Department, Moscow State University

The MSU Faculty of Chemistry is the chemical faculty of Moscow State University. It was established in 1929. The current acting dean of the faculty is Sergej S. Karlov.

== Notable alumni ==
- Ilya Vasilyevich Berezin
- Valeriy Valentinovich Efremov
- Vladimir Isaevich Feldman
- Vasily Semyonovich Grossman
- Miliana Kroumova Kaisheva
- Viktor Aleksandrovich Kabanov
- Bonifatiy Mikhaylovich Kedrov
- Yuriy Anatolyevich Ovchinnikov
- Nikolay Alfredovich Plate
- Mikhail Alekseevich Prokofyev
- Evgeniy Dmitrievich Schukin
- Viktor Ivanovich Spitsyn
- Yuriy Timofeevich Struchkov
- Aleksandr Ivanovich Zaytsev
- Nikolay Serafimovich Zefirov
- Sergey Kara-Murza
