= Miliana Kaisheva =

Bulgarian physical chemist

- Миляна Крумова Кайшева
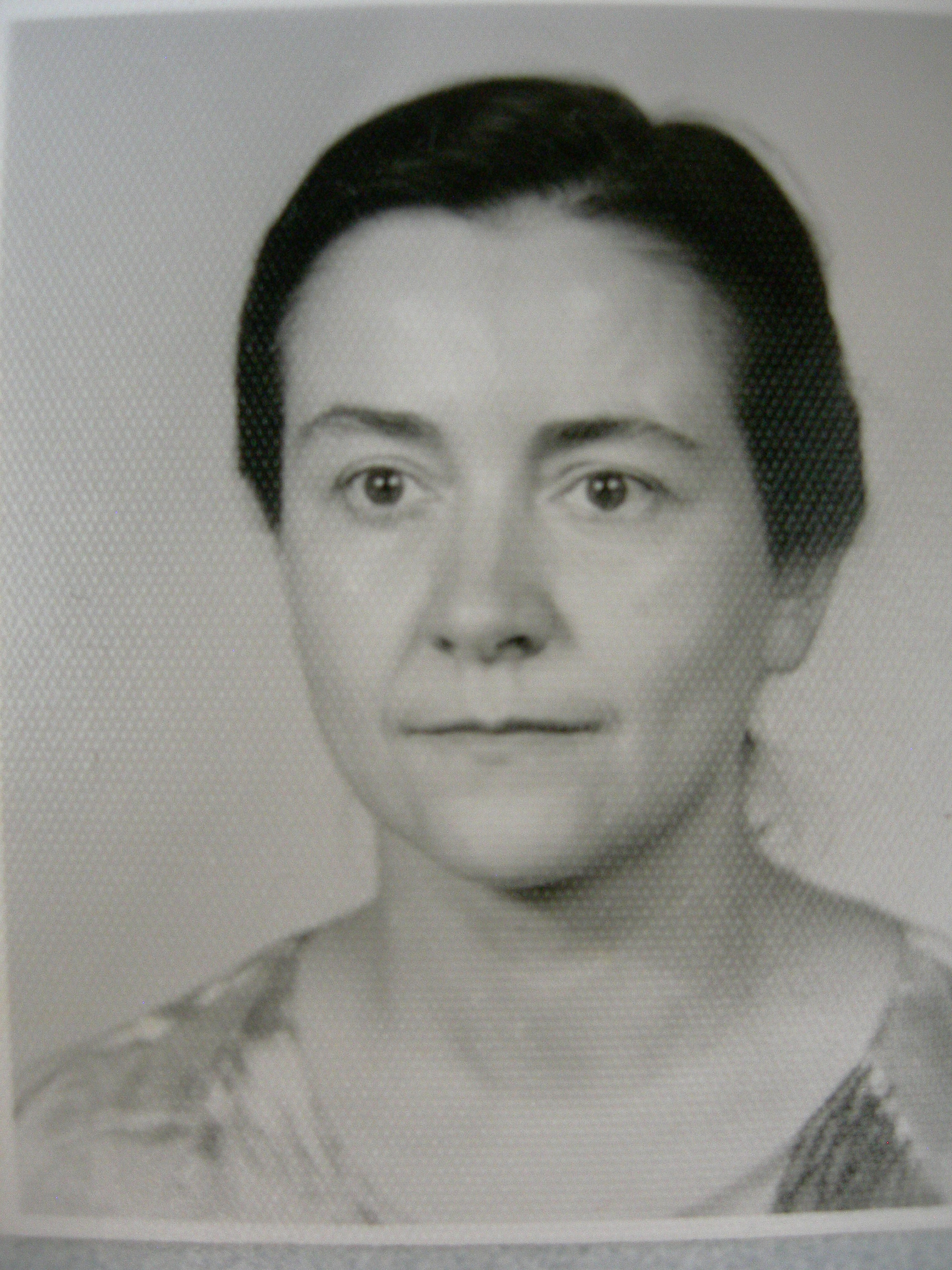
- Born: Miliana Kroumova Kaisheva; 1 November 1945
- Died: 24 March 2003 (aged 57)
- Education: Faculty of Chemistry of Moscow State University
- Scientific career
- Fields: Electrochemistry and Colloid Chemistry

Milliana Kroumova Kaisheva (Bulgarian: Миляна Крумова Кайшева) (1 November 1945 in Sofia, Bulgaria – 24 March 2003 in Sofia, Bulgaria) was a Bulgarian physical chemist, internationally known for her work in electrochemistry and colloid chemistry.

== Biography ==
Kaisheva's father, Kroum P. Kaishev (1913-2004), was a professor in oil chemistry and former Rector of the University of Chemical Technology, Sofia. Her mother, Maria D. Kaisheva (born October 1920) was a journalist.

In 1969 Kaisheva received a Master of Science degree from the Faculty of Chemistry of Moscow State University and in 1974 she obtained a PhD from the same university's Department of Electrochemistry, under the joint supervision of Alexander N. Frumkin and Boris B. Damaskin, the authors of what is now known as the Frumkin-Damaskin theory of adsorption of molecules on electrodes. In 1975 she joined the Department of Physical Chemistry of the Faculty of Chemistry at Sofia University, Bulgaria as an assistant professor. In 1988 she became associate professor in the same department. On 19 April 2001, she received the degree of Doctor of Sciences in Chemistry.

== Career ==
Her main research subjects was the study of the capacitance of the double layer of organic molecules of surfactants on a dropping mercury electrode and the study of thin liquid films formed by surfactants. She has over 80 publications, among which academic papers published in: Journal of Electroanalitical Chemistry, Colloid and Polymer Science, Colloids and Surfaces, Langmuir, Electrochimica Acta, J. Coll. Int. Sci., Advances in Colloid Interface Sci., J. Applied Electrochemistry, Soviet Electrochemistry, J. Dispersion Science and Technology, Plating and Surface Finishing, Colloids and Surfaces, B: Biointerfaces, STP Pharma Sciences, etc.

In 1999 she received the Abner Brenner Silver Medal and First Time Authors Award of the American Electroplaters & Surface Finishers’ Society for an outstanding paper published in the journal Plating and Surface Finishing.

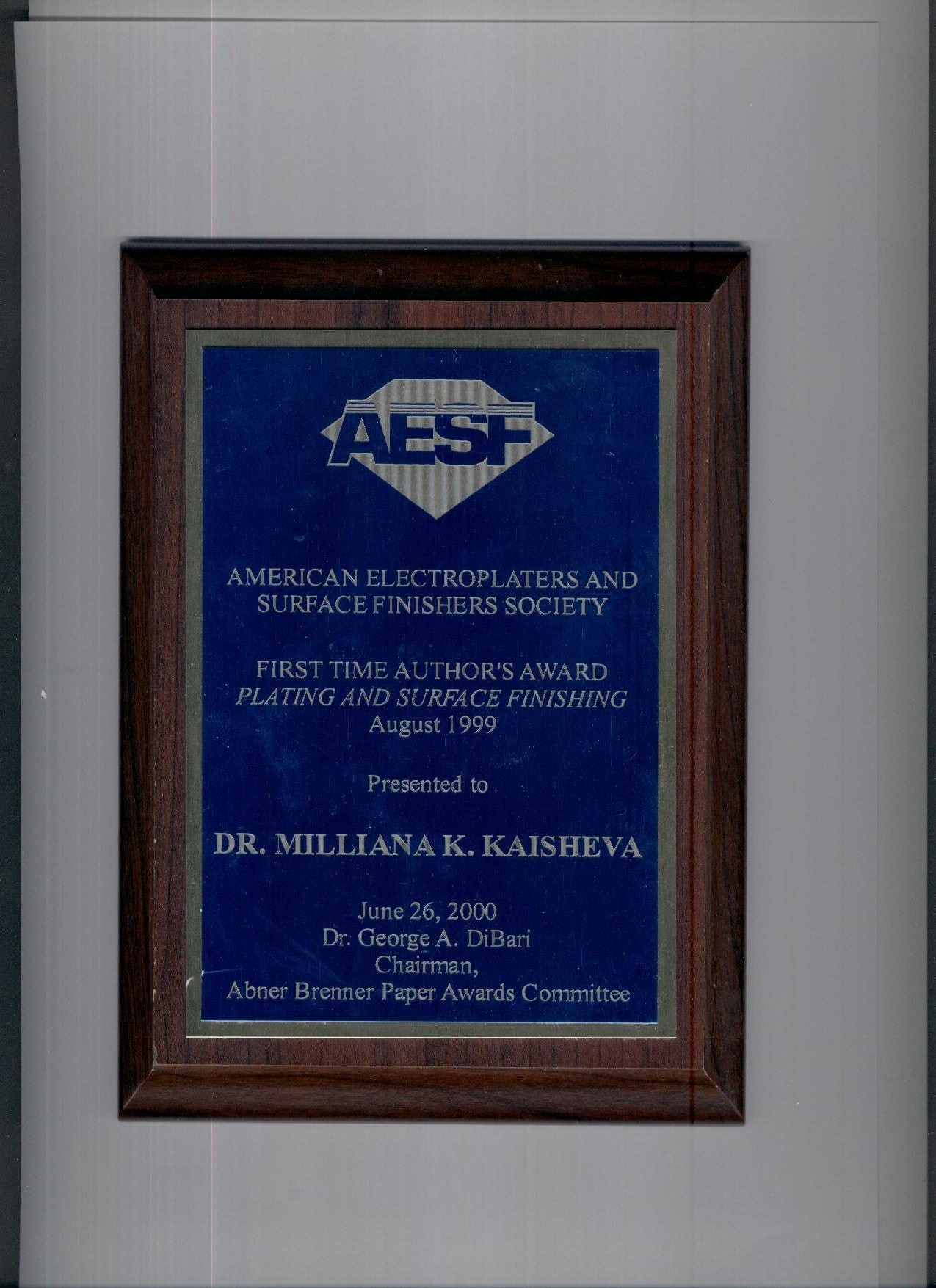

Kaisheva has been a teacher in her field at Undergraduate, Master and PhD levels, as a professor at Sofia University and also as a visiting professor and scientist at the University of Franche-Comté (Besançon, France), Kyoto University, University of Sendai (Tohoku, Japan), Katholieke Universiteit, Leuven (Belgium). She taught courses in Electrochemistry, Applied Electrochemistry, Physical Chemistry, Colloid Chemistry, Properties of Surfactant Solutions. Prof Kaisheva has supervised 5 PhD students and over 20 MSc students at the Department of Physical Chemistry of Sofia University. She was also external examiner for PhD students from other foreign universities.(e.g. Alagappa University, Madurai-Kamaraj-University, Central Electrochemical Research Institute in Karaikudi, Tamil Nadu – India).

In 1986 she was invited as a visiting scientist to Kyoto University, Institute for Chemical Research, Uji, Kyoto, Japan, to the Laboratory of Prof. T. Takenaka as well as to the University of Sendai (Tohoku), Research Institute for Mineral Dressing and Metallurgy, Katahira, Sendai, Japan, the Laboratory of Prof. S. Usui. In 1991-1992 she was awarded a Senior Fulbright Fellowship and worked in the Faculty of Chemistry, Georgetown University, Washington DC, USA, at the Laboratory of Prof. Robert de Levie.

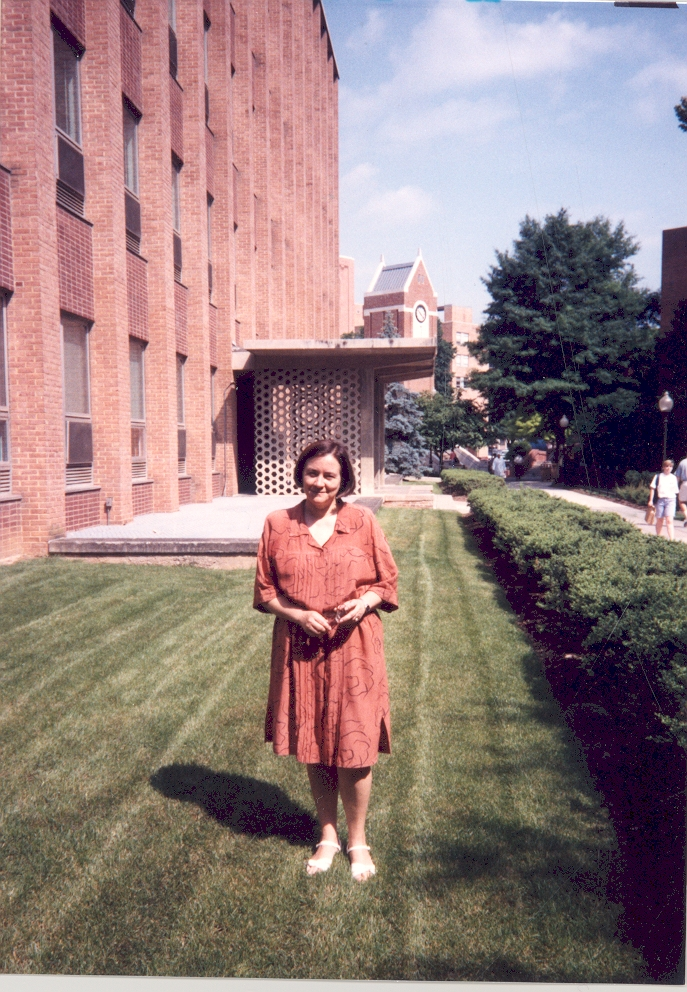

From 1995 to 1998 Kaisheva was the Bulgarian co-ordinator of a successfully completed international joint Copernicus project entitled"Improvement of the Electrolytic Synthesis of Corrosion and Wear Resistant Composite Coatings by the Controlled Use of Selected Ionic and Nonionic Surfactants", funded by the European Commission with a co-ordinator from Belgian side - Prof. dr. Ir. Jean-Pierre Celis, Katholieke Universiteit, Leuven, Department of Metallurgy and Materials Engineering, and with the participation of partners from Polish Academy of Sciences, Jagiellonian University, Kraków, Poland and National Technical University of Athens, Greece.

In 1999 Kaisheva was the Bulgarian co-ordinator of the international joint Inco-Copernicus project "COPELFLOW - ERBI C 15 98 01 21" on electro-floto-coagulation after the electrolytic synthesis of Ni-SiC composite coatings, funded by the European Commission with a co-ordinator from the French side - Prof. A. Foissy from the Laboratory of Electrochemistry and Microdisperse Systems at the University of Franche-Comté, Besançon, France, and with the participation of partners from the Polish Academy of Sciences and the Katholieke Universiteit, Leuven, Belgium.

In 2002 she worked at the Laboratory of Surface and Interface Engineered Materials, Department of Metallurgy and Materials Engineering, Katholieke Universiteit Leuven, Belgium, collaborating with Dr. Jan Fransaer.

Milliana Kaisheva died on 24/03/2003 in her home city of Sofia. An "In Memoriam" article has been published for her in the journal of the Union of Scientists of Bulgaria (USB), written by Prof. B. Tsarnorechki. The final scientific article of Milliana Kaisheva has been published after her death.

=== Selected publications ===
1. R.I. Kaganovich, B. Damaskin, M. Kaisheva, Investigation of the Adsorption of Naphthalene and Biphenyl on Mercury from Dimethylformamide solutions. Electrokhimiya 6 (1970) 1359; Soviet Electrochemistry, 6 (1970) 1313.
2. M. Kaisheva, B. Damaskin, R.I.Kaganovich, Adsorption of - and -Naphthol on Mercury from Dimethylformamide solutions. Electrokhimiya, 8 (1972) 1642; Soviet Electrochemistry 8 (1972) 1599.
3. M. Kaisheva, R.I. Kaganovich, B. Damaskin, Investigation of the Adsorption on Mercury of - and -Naphthylamine from Dimethylformamide solutions. Electrokhimiya, 9 (1973) 94; Soviet Electrochemistry, 9 (1973) 92.
4. M. Kaisheva, B. Damaskin, R.I. Kaganovich, Application of the Generalized Model of Interfacial Layer to the Description of the Adsorption on Mercury of Biphenyle, Naphthalene and their Polar Derivatives from Dimethylformamide solutions. Electrokhimiya, 10 (1974) 1725; Soviet Electrochemistry, 10 (1974) 1636.
5. M. Kaisheva, B. Damaskin, R.I. Kaganovich, Role of the Functional Group during Adsorption on Mercury of Monosubstituted Derivatives of Naphthalene from Dimethylformamide solutions. Electrokhimiya, 11 (1975) 431; Soviet Electrochemistry, 11 (1975) 398.
6. M. K. Kaisheva, Investigation of the Adsorption of Naphthalene, Biphenyl and Their Derivatives at the Mercury-Dimethyleformamide Interface, Ph. D. Thesis, Moscow State University, Moscow, 1974.
7. D. Platikanov, M. Nedyalkov, M. Kaisheva, Contact Angles in the Case of Thin Aqueous Films on a Polaized Mercury Substrate, Ann. Sof. Univ., Fac. Chem., 69 (1974/1975) 113.
8. M. Kaisheva, V. Kaishev, Study of the Adsorption of Cetyle Trimethyle Ammonium Bromide on a Dropping Mercury Electrode, Ann. Sofia Univ., Fac. Chem., 70 (1975/1976) 71.
9. M. Kaisheva, Influence of the Surfactant on the Average Activity of the Supporting Electrolyte in Adsorption Studies, Ann. Sof. Univ., Fac.Chem., 73 (1978/1979) 123.
10. M. Kaisheva, Modelling of Adsorption Processes in the Electrical Double Layer by Means of Experimental and Statistical Methods, Ann. Sof. Univ., Fac. Chem., 75 (1981) 247.
11. M. Kaisheva, V. Kaishev, Estimation of Electrical Double Layer Parameters on the Basis of Frumkin Isotherm, Ann. Sofia Univ., Fac. Chem., 76 (1982) 154 .
12. N. Raev, V. Kaishev, M. Kaisheva, Determination of Colloid Surfactants concentration by means of Differential Capacity Measurements, Travaux Scientifiques de l'Institut des Industries Alimentaires - Plovdiv, 29 (1982) 109.
13. M. Matsumoto, M. Kaisheva, The Adsorption Structure on the Mercury Electrode in a Thin Liquid Film, Coll. Polymer Sci., 263 (1985) 512.
14. M. Matsumoto, M. Kaisheva, Structure Formation by Nonionic Surfactant in a Thin Liquid Film Between a Mercury Electrode and a Hydrogen Bubble, Ann. Sof. Univ., Fac. Chem., 76 (1982) 144.
15. M. Kaisheva, V. Kaishev, M. Matsumoto, "Adsorption of Dodecylhexaoxyethylene Glycol Monoether. A Spline Regression Model", J.Electroanal. Chem., 171 (1984) 111.
16. M. Kaisheva, A Method for Amalgamation of Platinum Electrodes, Bulgarian Patent (Author's Certificate) No. 38572, October 2, 1984.
17. M. Kaisheva, Kinetics of Adsorption of a Colloid Surfactant at Mercury Electrode/Solution Interface, Materials Sci. Forum, 25-26 (1988) 463.
18. M. Kaisheva, Study of Surfactant Adsorption Kinetics on a Mercury Electrode, Ann. Sof. Univ., Fac. Chem., 78 (1984) 119.
19. M. Kaisheva, S. Usui, T. Girkov, Thin Films from Anionic Surfactant Solutions on Mercury, Ann. Sof. Univ., Fac. Chem., 78 (1984) 153.
20. M. Kaisheva, T. Girkov, B. Damaskin, Temperature Dependence of the Sodium Dodecylsulphate Adsorption, Electrokhimiya, 21 (1985) 831; Soviet Electrochemistry, 21 (1985) 773.
21. 19. M. Kaisheva, V. Kaishev, Estimation of Adsorption Parameters in Two Models of Differential Capacity. A Comparison Based on Nonlinear Regression Analysis, Langmuir, 1 (1985) 760.
22. M. Kaisheva, Correlation Between Adsorption Phenomena and Stability of Thin Films from Dodecylhexaoxyethylene Glycol Monoether Solutions on Electrodes, Proc. Sixth Int. Conf. Surface Active Substances, Bad Stuer, Akademie Verlag, Berlin (1987) 251.
23. M. Kaisheva, Ann. Sof. Univ., Fac. Chem., 79 (1985) 466.
24. M. Kaisheva, V. Kaishev, Statistical Estimation of Electrical Double Layer Parameters of a Stationary Electrode in the Presence of Sodium Dodecylsulphate, Electrokhimiya, 22 (1986) 854; Soviet Electrochemistry, 22 (1986) 804.
25. M. Kaisheva, V. Kaishev, Nonlinear Regression Analysis Applied to a Model of Differential Capacity with Six Adsorption Parameters, Proc. 37-th Meeting of the Int. Soc. Electrochem., Vilnius, 3 (1986) 287.
26. M. Kaisheva, S. Usui, Dai Qi, Interaction Between a Stationary Mercury Electrode and a Hydrogen Bubble in an Aqueous Sodium Dodecylsulphate Solution, Colloids and Surfaces, 29 (1988) 147.
27. M. Kaisheva, M. Matsumoto, Y. Kita, T. Takenaka, Adsorption of Transfer Ribonucleic Acid on a Stationary Mercury Electrode, Langmuir, 4 (1988) 762.
28. A. Anastopoulos, M. Kaisheva, Adsorption of Tri(n)octylphosphine Oxide From Methanolic Solutions of Different Supporting Electrolyte Content, Electrochimica Acta, 35 (1990) 379.
29. Q. Dai, H. Sasaki, S. Usui, M. Kaisheva, Effect of Sodium Dodecylsulphate Concentration on the Attachment Between Mercury and Argon Bubbles in Aqueous Solutions, J. Coll. Int. Sci., 139 (1990) 30.
30. M. Kaisheva, G. Saraivanov, Ann. Sof. Univ., Fac. Chem., 83 (1991) 31.
31. M. Kaisheva, G. Saraivanov, A. Anastopoulos, Adsorption Studies of n-Hexadecyl Tributylphosphonium Bromide at the Mercury/Solution Interface Through Differential Capacity Measurements, Langmuir, 7 (1991) 2380.
32. M. Kaisheva, B. Damaskin, R.I. Kaganovich, I. Kostova, Ditropyl in Dimethyle Formamide Solutions Adsorption Parameters, Elektrokhimiya, 27 (1991) 367.
33. A. Anastopoulos, M. Kaisheva, On the Effect of Adsorbed Substances Undergoing Interfacial Rearrangements on the Kinetics of Ion and Electron Transfer Reactions. The Case of n-Hexadecyl Tributylphosphonium Bromide, J. Electroanal. Chem., 317 (1991) 279.
34. E. Stenina, B. Damaskin, M. Kaisheva, G. Saraivanov, Calculation of the Adsorption Parameters of Organic Substances on the Basis of the Two-Component System Adsorption Isotherm, Elektrokhimiya, 27 (1991) 1385; Soviet Electrochemistry, 27 (1991) 1226 (Copyright 1992 Plenum Press Publishing Corporation).
35. G. Saraivanov, M. Kaisheva, Influence of the Interfacial Potential Differences on the Line Tension, Bulgarian Academy of Sciences, Communications of the Department of Chemistry, 24 (1991) 613.
36. S. Ch. Miloshev, I. M. Nishkov, M. K. Kaisheva, Potassium Oleate's Influence on Electroflotation of Metal-containing Waste Waters, Bulgarian Academy of Sciences, Communications of the Department of Chemistry, 24 (1991) 640.
37. M. Kaisheva, V. Ilieva, V. Kaishev, Ann. Sofia Univ., Fac. Chem., 80 (1992) 150.
38. M. Kaisheva, M. Matsumoto, Y. Kita, T. Takenaka, Ann. Sofia Univ., Fac. Chem., 80 (1992) 159.
39. G. Saraivanov, M. Kaisheva, Analytical Model of Differential Capacity Based on the Isotherm of Quasi-Chemical Approximation. An influence of the adsorption parameters, Electrochim. Acta, 37 (1992) 1273.
40. M. K. Kaisheva, Electrosorption of Amphiphilic Surfactants at the Mercury-Solution Interface and its Influence on the Stability of Thin Liquid Films, Advances in Colloid Interface Sci., 38 (1992), 319.
41. G. Saraivanov, M. Kaisheva, Ann. Sofia Univ., Fac. Chem., 82 (1992) 219.
42. M. Kaisheva, V. Kaishev, Ann. Sofia Univ., Fac. Chem., 82 (1992) 225.
43. M. Kaisheva, Ann. Sof. Univ., Fac. Chem. 82 (1992) 235.
44. B. Kurtyka, M. Kaisheva, R. De Levie, On interfacial dynamics: capacitance transients accompanying partial desorption, J. Electroanal. Chem., 341, (1992), 343.
45. M. Kaisheva, R. De Levie, Kinetic observations of the capacitance of near-saturated 1-octanol solutions, J. Electroanal. Chem., 352, (1993), 321.
46. A. Anastopoulos, M. Kaisheva, Influence of Supporting Electrolyte Concentration on the Electrosorption of Tri(n)octylphosphine Oxide From Methanolic Solutions, Ann. Sof. Univ., Fac. Chem, 81, (1994) 183.
47. V. Ilieva, B. Damaskin, M. Kaisheva, Study of Differential Capacity and Adsorption Parameters of 1-Propanol, Bulgarian Chemical Communications, 27, No. 3 (1994) 539.
48. Rossen D. Atanassov, Dimo N. Platikanov and Milliana K. Kaisheva, Investigation of thin films formed on an aqueous surface from dichloroethane solutions; J. Coll. Interface Sci., 169 (1995) 79
49. V. Vacheva, B. Damaskin, M. Kaisheva, Electrokhimiya, 31, No. 8 (1995) 848–855.
50. V. Vacheva, M. Kaisheva, P. Nikitas, Application of a Two-State Adsorption Isotherm to the Electrosorption of Dodecyl Diphenylphosphine Oxide on Mercury, Langmuir, 11 (1995) 4564–4567.
51. V. Vacheva, P. Nikitas, M. Kaisheva, "Description of Dodecyl Diphenylphosphine Oxide Electrosorption on Mercury by a Molecular Model Including the Polarizabilities of the Solvent and Adsorbate", Annuaire de l'Universite de Sofia, Faculte de Chimie, 88 (1995) in press.
52. M. K. Kaisheva, L. Alexandrova, T. Nedialkova, Influence of Surfactants and other Factors on the Treatment of Waters, Contaminated by Heavy Metal Ions, Proceedings of the 4-th World Surfactants Congress, June 1996, Barcelona, Spain, Vol. 4, (1996) 233.
53. V. Vacheva, M. Kaisheva, B. Damaskin, Influence of the Chain-Length on the Adsorption Parameters of Fatty Alcohols Estimated on the basis of Differential Capacity Data, Electrochimica Acta, 42 (1997) 2327.
54. M. Kaisheva, E. Dimitrova, D. Platikanov, V. Todorova, "Thin Liquid Films from Water-Based Dispersions of Cellulose Acethophthalate in the Presence of Pilocarpine Hydrochloride", J. Dispersion Science and Technology, 18 (1997) 719.
55. V. Terzieva, M. Kaisheva, S. Ganeva, "Application of Drop Weight Interfacial Tensiometry to the Quantitative Analysis of Cu/SiO2 composite coatings", Colloids and Surfaces, 155 (1999) 155.
56. C. Dedeloudis, M. K. Kaisheva, N. Muleshkov, T. Muleshkov, P. Nowak, J. Fransaer, J. P. Celis, "Codeposition of submicron silicon carbide with nickel", Plating and Surface Finishing, 86, August (1999) 57.
57. M. K. Kaisheva, M. Krasteva, S. Usui, "Thin liquid films from dilute sodium dodecyl sulphate solutions formed on mercury electrode" Langmuir 16 (2000) 1243.
58. P. Nowak, R. Socha, M. Kaisheva, J. Fransaer, J.-P. Celis, Z. Stoinov, "Electrochemical Investigations of the Codeposition of SiC and SiO2 particles with Nickel", J. Applied Electrochemistry, 30 (2000) 429–437.
59. B. Diakova, M. Kaisheva, D. Platikanov, E. Dimitrova, "Thin liquid Films from Aqueous Solutions of Polyoxyethylene-polyoxypropylene- Block Copolymer, Cellulose Acetophthalate and Pilocarpine Hydrochloride", STP Pharma Sciences 10 (2000) 229–233.
60. M. Kaisheva, L. Alexandrova, I. Spassov, B. Diakova, "Investigations of thin films formed from liposome suspensions on quartz substrate", Colloids and Surfaces, B: Biointerfaces, 20 (2000) 137–143.
61. B. Diakova, M. Kaisheva, D. Platikanov, "Thin Liquid Films from Polyoxyethylene-polyoxypropylene-block copolymer on the Surface of Fused Quartz", Colloids and Surfaces, A, 190 (2001) 61–70.
62. B. Diakova, C. Filiatre, D. Platikanov, A. Foissy, M. Kaisheva, Thin wetting films from aqueous electrolyte solutions on SiC/Si wafer, Advances in Colloid Interface Science, 96 (2002), 193.

Books

1. N. Rangelova, S. Tchaliovska, M. Nedialkov, J. Petrov, M. Kaisheva, "Handbook of Physical and Colloid Chemistry", Sofia University Press, Sofia, First Edition1987,
2. N. Rangelova, S. Tchaliovska, M. Nedialkov, J. Petrov, M. Kaisheva, "Handbook of Physical and Colloid Chemistry", Sofia University Press, Sofia, Second Revised Edition 1997.
