= Maria Rumyantseva =

Russian lady-in-waiting (1699–1788)

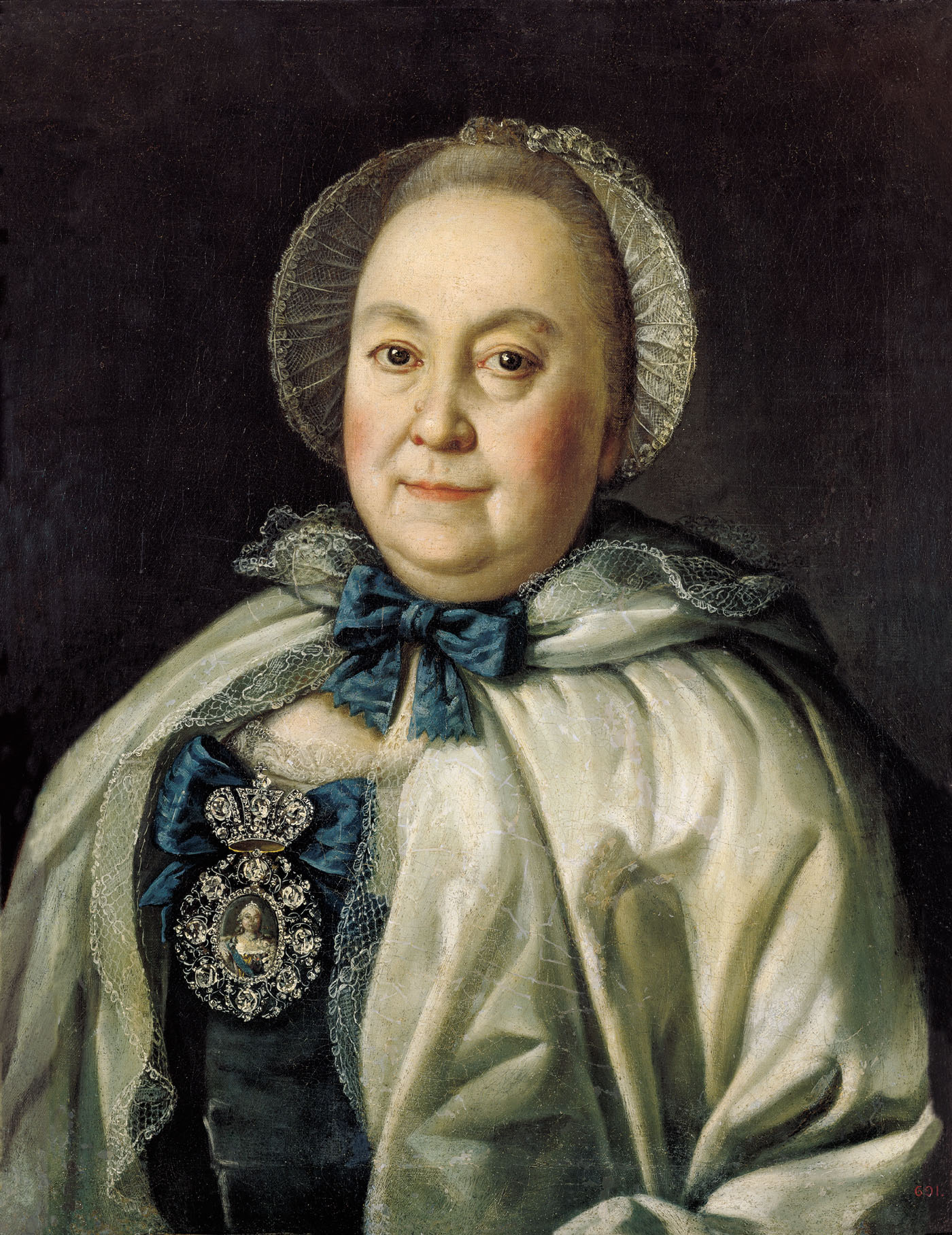
Portrait by Aleksey Antropov, 1764

Countess Maria Andreyevna Rumyantseva (Russian: Мари́я Андре́евна Румя́нцева, née Matveyeva, Russian: Матве́ева; 1699–1788) was a Russian lady-in-waiting and alleged royal mistress of Tsar Peter the Great.

== Life ==
She was the daughter of privy councilor of Count Andrey Matveyev (1666–1728) from his first marriage with Anna Stepanovna Anichkov (1666–1699), and paternal granddaughter boyar Artamon Matveyev. She received a European education, living the first years of her life in Vienna and The Hague, where her father served as ambassador until 1710.

=== Reign of Peter the Great ===
Fluent in French, a skillful dancer, beautiful and lively she attracted the attention of Peter I. Peter was severely jealous, reportedly threatened her with corporal punishment if she had another lover, placed her first among his mistresses and is said to have loved her until his death. She married 10 July 1720 Alexander Rumyantsev, and the couple were granted valuable gifts from the monarch.

In 1725 her husband was in Constantinople and then to the Persian frontier to the disengagement, but Mary remained in Moscow and gave birth to a fourth child, a son, baptized in honor of Tsar Peter Alexandrovich. Grand Duke Nikolai Mikhailovich reported that the boy's father was not her spouse, but Tsar Peter himself.

=== Reign of Anna ===
When Anna Ivanovna stripped her spouse of rank and exiled him to Kazan village, she and the children were sent to live in Alatyr village, where they spent about three years. In 1735 her husband had been restored to the rank of lieutenant general and made of Astrakhan, and then the Kazan governor, and appointed commander of the troops sent against the rebellious Bashkir. In 1738 Rumyantsev was appointed governor of Ukraine, and the family moved to Kiev where, with the help of Mavra Shuvalova, Rumyantsev liaised with the disgraced Princess Elizabeth.

=== Reign of Elizabeth ===
She was given the title countess and made lady in waiting to Empress Elizabeth of Russia, and had a lot of influence at court during her reign: reportedly, foreign powers paid her bribes for her influence.

In 1744, Empress Elizabeth ordered her to head the court of princess Catherine as Ober-Hofmeisterin. She was not popular with Catherine, who claims in her memoirs that Rumyantseva was the cause of her great debts during her first years in Russia, by introducing her to expensive habits motivated by claiming it to be necessary Russian etiquette customs.

After the marriage of Catherine to Grand Duke Peter in 1745, she was replaced in her office by Maria Choglokova.

=== Reign of Catherine II ===
During the reign of Empress Catherine II, she continued to take part in court life and be present at ceremonies. In 1776, she was again appointed Ober-Hofmeisterin to the household of Catherine.
