= Scottish Russians =

Ethnic group

Scottish Russians are Russians with full or partial Scottish ancestry. Scottish migration to Russia occurred primarily during the early 17th-century Polish–Muscovite War, the Ingrian War, and the Thirty Years' War. Some estimates of the number of Scottish settlers in Russia during the 17th century are as high as 100,000. This has led some demographers to believe that the current number of Russians of a partial Scottish descent (in a varying degree) could be up to 1 or 2 million. There are believed to be around 400 different Russian surnames that owe their names to Scottish ancestors.

Despite the long history of the Scottish presence in Russia, the 2021 Russian census was not recording individuals who claimed to be ethnic Scottish, it defined them as part of the British people instead, whose number was 1,167. According to the same census, nobody in Russia claimed to be a native speaker of Scottish Gaelic or Scots.

== History ==
In 1507, four Scottish gunners were sent by King Christian III of Denmark to support Russian-allied forces. During the Polish–Russian War (1605–18), a regiment originally under the command of William Grim and later under Captain (Rittmeister) Jacob Shaw was in the service of the Polish–Lithuanian Commonwealth. During the 1614 siege of the fortress of Bely the regiment switched sides, surrendered the fortress and joined Russia's military forces. It was raised in Scotland, and a company was raised in Ireland. The regiment participated in several Russo-Crimean Wars against the Crimean–Nogai raids. Beginning in 1626, foreign mercenaries were identified by their Russian names and (after converting to Orthodox Christianity) typically received land, serfs, money and clothing.

== Clans ==
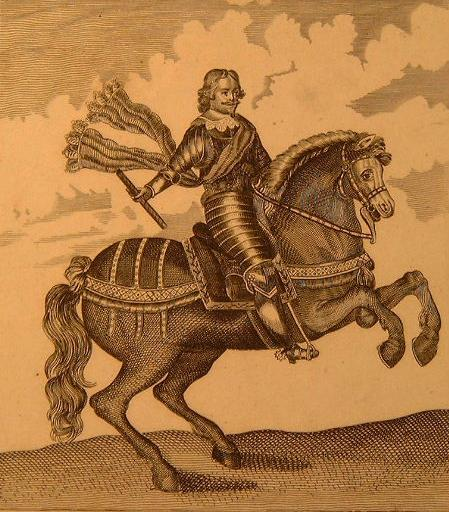
Alexander Leslie

A number of families of Scottish origin were part of the Russian Empire's landed aristocracy. Two noble families were descended from Clan Ramsay: Ramsay and De Balmen (both counts).

The Leslie family was headed by Alexander Leslie of Auchintoul (died 1663 in Smolensk), a Scottish soldier in the service of the tsar. Leslie commanded Russian forces during the Siege of Smolensk (1654), one of the first major events of the Russo-Polish War (1654–67), and was descended from Clan Leslie of Auchintoul. The owner of Gorchakov Manor, he was the voivode of Smolensk.

Tam Dalyell of the Binns (1615–1685), a Scottish Royalist general in the Wars of the Three Kingdoms known as "Bluidy Tam" and "The Muscovite De'il", was in Russian service. William Drummond, 1st Viscount Strathallan, Lord Drummond of Cromlix (1617–1688), was a lieutenant-general in the tsar's army.

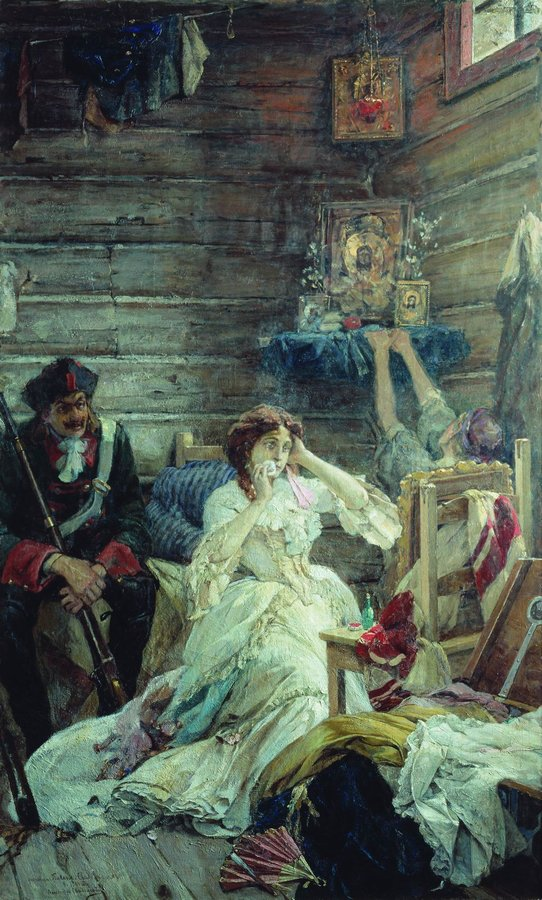
Pavel Svedomskiy's Mary Hamilton Awaiting Execution (1904)

Several families are descendants of Clan Hamilton. The Gamontovs (or Gamoltovs) are descendants of Petr Gomoltov-Hamilton, an officer of Count Jacob De la Gardie since 1610 who remained in Russian service after the Battle of Klushino and had several granddaughters. The first (Eudoxia) was an aunt of Natalya Kirillovna Naryshkina, the Tsaritsa of Russia from 1671–1676 and the second wife of Tsar Alexei I and regent of Russia as the mother of Peter the Great in 1682. The second was a wife of Artamon Matveyev. The best-known was Mary Hamilton (Maria Danilovna Gamil'ton, Гамильтон, died 14 March 1719), lady-in-waiting of Empress Catherine I and mistress of Tsar Peter the Great, who was executed for abortion, infanticide, theft and slander (of Catherine).

The Khomutov family (Хомутовы) are descendants of Thomas Hamilton, a soldier who began Russian service in 1542 and arrived in the country with his son Petr (David). Michail G. Khomutov (Хомутов) was a cavalry general, adjutant general and an earl (Russian: Hаказной атаман) of the Don Cossacks in from 1848 to 1862. Anna Khomutova (1787–1858) was a Russian writer, sister of Michail Khomutov and cousin of Ivan Kozlov. The von Fersen family are descendants of the Clan Macpherson, and Baron Vasili Nikolaevich von Fersen (1858–1937) was an admiral in the Imperial Russian Navy.

The Bruces are descendants of the Clan Bruce. Count Roman Vilimovich Bruce (1668–1720) was the first commander of Saint Petersburg, brother of Jacob Bruce and father of Alexander Romanovich Bruce. Bruce joined Peter the Great's army in 1683, became captain of the Preobrazhensky Regiment in 1695 and participated in Peter's 1695–6 Azov campaigns.

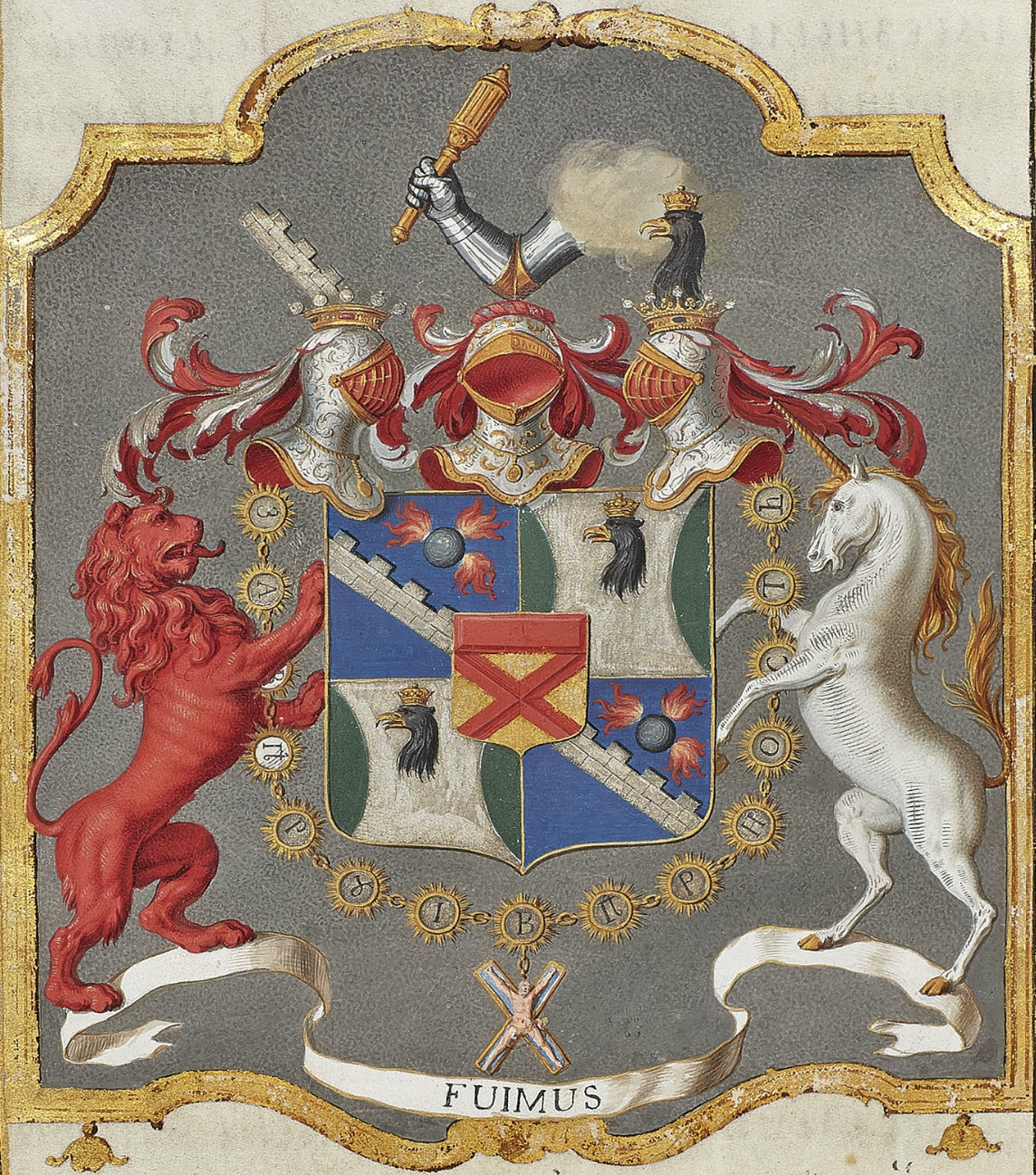
Coat of arms of Count Jacob Bruce from his diploma of nobility. Note the red lion and unicorn, symbols of Scotland.

Jacob Bruce (Брюс, 1669–1735) was a statesman, military leader and scientist descended from the Clan Bruce. According to Bruce, his ancestors had lived in Russia since 1649. He was the brother of Robert Bruce, the first military governor of Saint Petersburg.

Count Yakov Alexandrovich Bruce (1732–1791) was a Russian general. Bruce was a grandson of Lieutenant General Robert Bruce and a great-nephew of Jacob Bruce. His father was Count Alexander Bruce, and Ekaterina Alekseyevna Dolgorukova was his stepmother. Bruce married Praskovia Rumiantseva, sister of General (later Field Marshal) Pyotr Rumyantsev.

Prince Michael Andreas Barclay de Tolly was a field marshal and minister of war during Napoleon's 1812 invasion and the War of the Sixth Coalition. Prince Alexander Barclay de Tolly-Weymarn (1824–1905) was a Russian regimental, division and corps commander. He was the son of Wilhelm Peter Jost von Weymarn, and the grandson of Kristina Bogdanovna Barclay de Tolly.

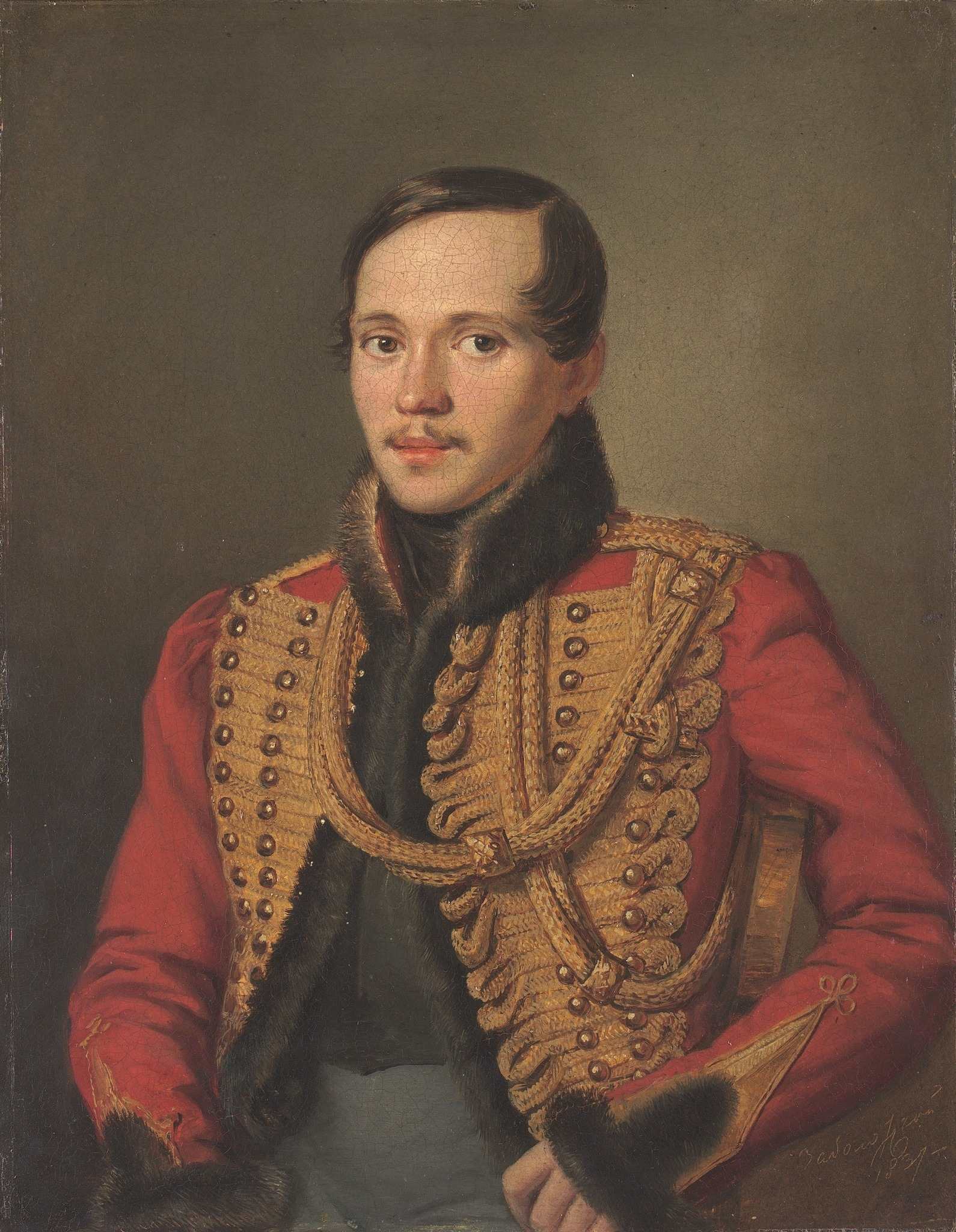
Mikhail Lermontov in 1837

The Lermontovs were descendants of George Learmonth (Лермонт), an ensign in Jacob Shaw's regiment during the Smolensk War (1632–1634). A Rittmeister of Reiters commanded by Semen Prozorovsky, Learmonth died in battle against soldiers commanded by Field Hetman of Lithuania Krzysztof Radziwiłł in August 1633.

Mikhail Lermontov, of the Learmonth family, can be traced to George Learmonth. According to his family, George Learmonth descended from the 13th-century Scottish poet Thomas the Rhymer (also known as Thomas Learmonth).

Julia Lermontova (1846–1919), the first female Russian chemist, was the first woman in the world to obtain a doctorate in chemistry, graduating magna cum laude. Lermontova studied at the Universities of Heidelberg and Berlin before receiving a doctorate from the University of Göttingen in 1874. She was inducted into the Russian Chemical Society the following year.

Mikhail N. Lermontov (Лермонтов, Михаил Николаевич) (1792–1866) was an admiral who served with distinction in the Finnish War (1808–1809) and the Crimean War. Alexander Mikhailovich Lermontov (1838–1906) was a division commander who participated in the Russo-Turkish War (1877–1878) and liberated Burgas, Bulgaria. Mikhail Lermontov, born 27 January 1953 in Pyatigorsk, is a doctor of culturology and was a member of the Civic Chamber of the Russian Federation from 2014 to 2017.

The Famintsyns are descendants of the Clan MacThomas by Kristof Tobias Tomson-Hominsky, a soldier in the Russian service. Egor Famintsyn was an ober-commandant of the Petropavlovkaya Fortress, and Andrei Famintsyn (Андрей Серге́евич Фаминцын) (1835, Moscow – 1918, Saint Petersburg) was a botanist and academician at the Petersburg Academy of Sciences in 1884. Alexander Famitsin (1841–1896) was a Russian musical writer, critic and musicologist, a professor at Saint Petersburg Conservatory, a pupil of Ignaz Moscheles, Moritz Hauptmann Ernst Richter, and a friend of Alexander Serov.

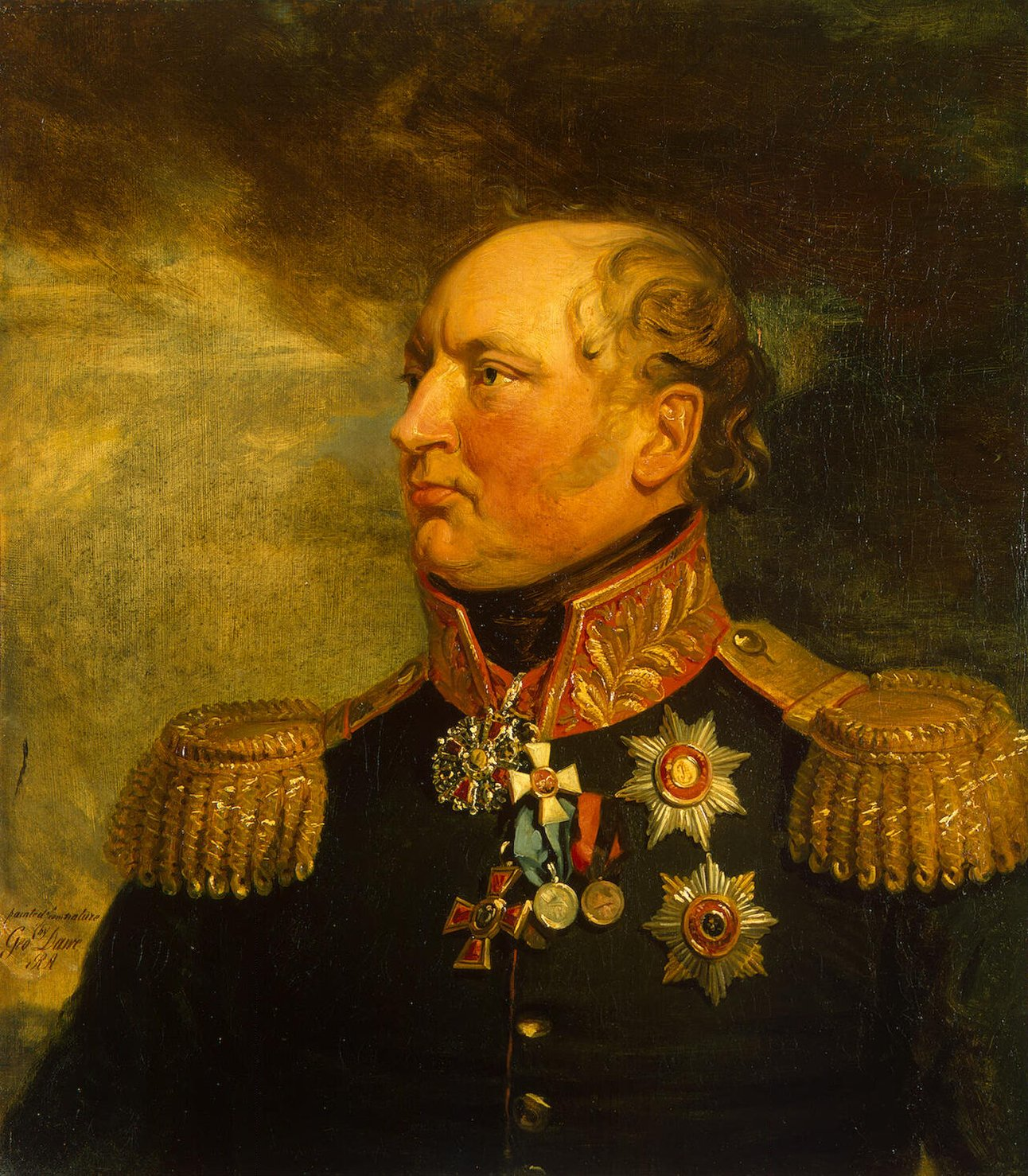
Fedor Fedorovich Leviz

The Kravtsovs are descendants of Donoghue Macgermerie-Mangarmov, a mercenary who was recruited for Jacob Shaw's regiment. Alexander J. Kravtsov, was an Imperial Army officer during World War I and a commander of the Orenburg Army's north group in the White movement during Alexander Dutov's revolt against Soviet authorities in Orenburg. He received the Gold Sword for Bravery during World War I on the Eastern Front for valor in 1915.

The Artamonovs were descendants of Art MacKeen-Magin, a soldier in the Polish–Lithuanian service who settled in Russia and became a pomeschik in Vologda. His son Ivan was ancestor of Artamonovs. Nikolay D. Artamonov (1840—1918) was a General of the Infantry, a military geodesist and a member of the Russian Astronomical Society.

Charles Cameron (1745–1812) was an architect who had an illustrious career at the court of Catherine II. Cameron, a devotee of early neoclassical architecture, was the chief architect of Tsarskoye Selo, the Pavlovsk Palace and the adjacent new town of Sophia from his 1779 arrival in Russia to Catherine's death in 1796. Count Andrey Matveyev (1666–1728), whose mother was Scottish, was one of the first Russian ambassadors and Peter the Great's agent in London and The Hague.

The Greig branch (Грейг) of Clan Gregor changed its name to "Greig" due to persecution of the MacGregors after the Jacobite rising of 1745. Samuel Greig (Самуи́л Ка́рлович Грейг), (1735, Inverkeithing, Fife, Scotland – 15 October 1788, Tallinn, Estonia, Russian Empire) was an admiral who distinguished himself in the Battle of Chesma (1770) and the Battle of Hogland (1788). His son, Alexey Greig, also had a career in the Imperial Russian Navy.

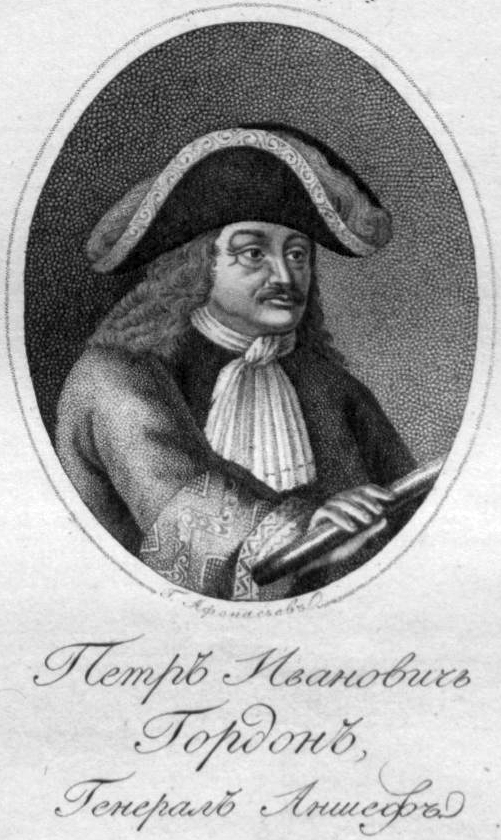
Petr Ivanovich Gordon (1635–1699)

Friedrich von Löwis of Menar (Russian: Фёдор Фёдорович Левиз, 6 September 1767, Haapsalu – 16 April 1824) was a lieutenant-general during the Napoleonic Wars. His family (commonly spelled "Lewis" in English) came to Sweden from South Scotland around 1630. By the time of Fedor's birth, his family was established in Livonia. William Fermor was an Imperial Russian Army officer best known for leading his country's army at the Battle of Zorndorf during the Seven Years' War.

The House of Gordon included Patrick Gordon (1635, Auchleuchries, Aberdeenshire, Scotland – 1699, Moscow), a general and rear admiral. Gordon, descended from an Aberdeenshire family who owned a small estate in Auchleuchries (near Ellon, was connected to the clan's Haddo branch. Alexander Gordon (1670–1752) was a general who fought under Peter the Great from 1696 to 1711 and for the Jacobites in the Jacobite rising of 1715. Gordon is mentioned as "Sandy Don" in the song, "Cam Ye O'er Frae France". He wrote a history of Peter the Great (including a brief account of his own life) which was published in Aberdeen in 1755 and in Leipzig a decade later and is available online. Thomas Gordon (c. 1658–1741) was a commodore of the Royal Scots Navy and an Imperial Russian Navy admiral.

Vasily Heste (Гесте) (c. 1753–1832) was an architect, civil engineer and town planner. Because of his influence at court, Heste's designs for buildings and towns remain throughout Russia. He built the Blue, Green, Red and Potseluev bridges.

Foma Fomich Mekenzi (1740–1786) was a rear admiral who founded the city of Sevastopol in 1783. Of Scottish Catholic origin from the Clan Mackenzie, he was born in the spring of 1740 (two years after his parents' marriage). MacKenzie was the son of another Thomas MacKenzie (Foma Kalinovich Mekenzi; Russian: Фома Калинович Мекензи where Kalinovich signifies "son of Colin"), who was also a rear admiral in Russian service. His mother, Ann MacKenzie (née Young), was the granddaughter of Kronstadt governor Thomas Gordon.

== See also ==
- Anglo-Russians
- Irish Russians
- Scottish diaspora
- Jacobite risings
- Highland Clearances
- Lowland Clearances
- Scottish Lithuanians
