= List of listed buildings in Dairsie, Fife =

This is a list of listed buildings in the parish of Dairsie in Fife, Scotland.

== List ==
Name	Location	Date listed	Grid ref. (Note: Sometimes known as OSGB36, the grid reference (where provided) is based on the British national grid reference system used by the Ordnance Survey. • "Guide to National Grid". Ordnance Survey. • "Get-a-map". Ordnance Survey.)	Geo-coordinates	Notes	LB number (Note: Historic Environment Scotland assign a unique alphanumeric identifier to each designated site in Scotland, for listed buildings this always begins with "LB", for example "LB12345".)	Image
Pittormie House Garden Wall Fountain To South And Gatepiers				56°21′17″N 2°56′29″W	Category B	2593	Upload Photo
Craigfoodie House And Garden Walls & Dovecot				56°21′02″N 2°57′41″W	Category B	2604	Upload Photo
Craigfoodie House Former Stable Block				56°21′01″N 2°57′44″W	Category B	2606	Upload Photo
Dairsie Bridge Over River Eden				56°20′01″N 2°56′47″W	Category A	2607	Upload another image
Middlefoodie House				56°20′44″N 2°57′55″W	Category C(S)	2616	Upload Photo
Newmill Farm House				56°19′26″N 2°58′30″W	Category B	2617	Upload Photo
Todhall House				56°20′31″N 2°58′35″W	Category B	2595	Upload Photo
Dairsie Old Church (St Mary's) Former Session House, Cemetery Walls And Gatepiers				56°20′01″N 2°56′58″W	Category A	2610	Upload another image
Dairsie Village 66 Main Street				56°20′46″N 2°56′53″W	Category C(S)	2611	Upload Photo
Todhall Steading				56°20′29″N 2°58′42″W	Category B	2597	Upload Photo
Dairsie Parish Manse And Garden Wall				56°20′23″N 2°57′10″W	Category B	2609	Upload Photo
Pittormie House Steading				56°21′17″N 2°56′40″W	Category B	2594	Upload Photo
Damside				56°20′52″N 3°00′25″W	Category B	4325	Upload Photo
Todhall Dovecot				56°20′33″N 2°58′28″W	Category B	2596	Upload Photo
Foodie Farmhouse				56°20′33″N 2°59′59″W	Category B	2613	Upload Photo
Dairsie Village, Vantage				56°20′47″N 2°57′14″W	Category B	4324	Upload Photo
Dairsie Castle				56°19′59″N 2°56′59″W	Category B	2608	Upload another image
Dairsie Village Woodville House (To South Of Dairsie Autopoint Garage)				56°20′40″N 2°57′02″W	Category B	2612	Upload Photo
Foodie Steading				56°20′34″N 3°00′08″W	Category B	2614	Upload another image
Wester Craigfoodie House And Garden Walls				56°20′59″N 2°57′43″W	Category B	2598	Upload Photo
Craigfoodie House Lodge				56°20′59″N 2°57′39″W	Category C(S)	2605	Upload Photo
Foodie Dovecot				56°20′34″N 2°59′47″W	Category B	2615	Upload Photo

== Key ==
The scheme for classifying buildings in Scotland is:

- Category A: "buildings of national or international importance, either architectural or historic; or fine, little-altered examples of some particular period, style or building type."
- Category B: "buildings of regional or more than local importance; or major examples of some particular period, style or building type, which may have been altered."
- Category C: "buildings of local importance; lesser examples of any period, style, or building type, as originally constructed or moderately altered; and simple traditional buildings which group well with other listed buildings."

In March 2016 there were 47,288 listed buildings in Scotland. Of these, 8% were Category A, and 50% were Category B, with the remaining 42% being Category C.

== See also ==
- List of listed buildings in Fife
