= Artamonov (disambiguation) =

Artamonov/Artamonova is a Russian surname.

Artamonov or Artamonova may also refer to:

- Artamonov (Russian nobility), Russian noble family
- Artamonov (crater), lunar crater
- Artamonova, Perm Krai, rural locality in Russia
