= George Learmonth of Balcomie =

Scottish landowner (died 1585)

George Learmonth of Balcomie (died 1585) was a Scottish landowner.

== Family background ==
He was the son of James Learmonth of Dairsie and Balcomie (d. 1547), who was Master of Household to James V of Scotland, and Katherine Ramsay. James Learmonth was a commissioner for the 1543 Treaty of Greenwich.

== Career ==
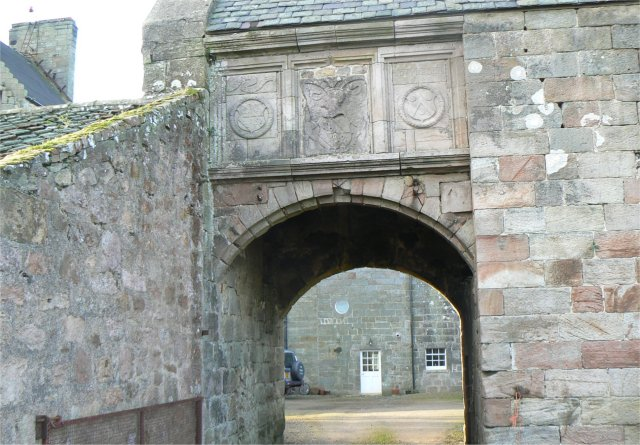
Entrance gateway to Balcomie Castle

His home was Balcomie Castle in Fife. He also leased property belonging to the Hospital of St Nicholas in St Andrews.

George Learmonth took part in the rebellion known as the Chaseabout Raid in 1565, and received a remission or pardon from Mary, Queen of Scots, in March 1566.

On 9 August 1569 he wrote to John Lesley, Bishop of Ross, from London, asking for a passport for himself, the son of James MacGill, Peter Young, and Patrick Adamson. He mentioned he carried a supply of German pistols.

His brother Patrick Learmonth of Dairsie was Provost of St Andrews. Patrick Learmonth lent money to his son-in-law, William Kirkcaldy of Grange, during the "lang siege" of Edinburgh Castle taking jewels belonging to Mary, Queen of Scots as security. These included a "carcan" necklace of 7 great rubies set in gold with 32 great pearls, for a loan of £1000 Scots made jointly with Michael Balfour feuar of Montquhanie.

At this time Learmonth and James Sandilands of St Monans were prosecuted by St Andrews burgh council for not paying rents for lands formerly belonging to the Dominican friars.

He died in 1585.

== Family ==
He married Euphemia Leslie, a daughter of George Leslie, 4th Earl of Rothes and Margaret Crichton. Their children included:

- James Learmonth of Balcomie, one of the Gentleman Adventurers of Fife and father of James Learmonth, Lord Balcomie. James Learmonth had a child with Grissell Gray in 1585, and with Helen Huntar, the wife of Alan Lentroun in St Andrews, in 1586.
- John Learmonth of Balcomie, who married Elizabeth Myrton. Their heraldry with the date 1602 is carved above the gateway at Balcomie.
- Robert Learmonth, who married Janet Skene, a daughter of John Skene, Lord Curriehill.

After his death, Euphemia Leslie married John Cunningham of Barns.
