= James Learmonth of Dairsie =

James Learmonth of Dairsie and Balcomie (died 1547) was a Scottish courtier and diplomat.

== Family ==
The Learmonth family estate was centered on Dairsie Castle and Clatto near St Andrews. James Learmonth bought Balcomie in 1526. James Learmonth married Katherine Ramsay, and secondly Grizel Meldrum. His children included Patrick Learmonth, George Learmonth of Balcomie, and Margaret Learmonth who married William Kirkcaldy of Grange.

According to George Buchanan, when Mary of Guise first came to Scotland in June 1538, she landed near James Learmonth's Balcomie Castle and travelled by land to St Andrews.

== Career ==
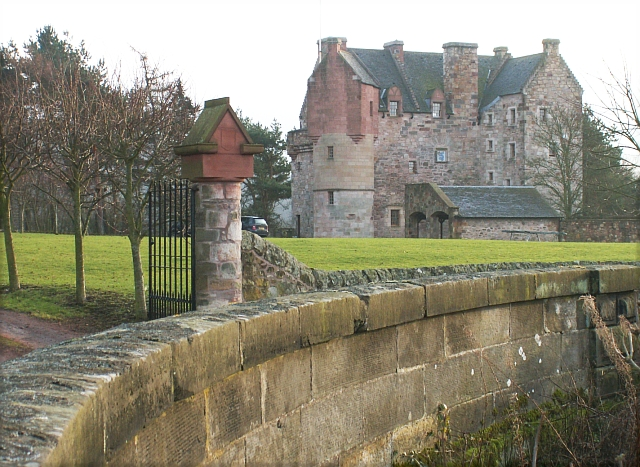
Dairsie Castle

James Learmonth was Master of Household to King James V. He was involved in the arrest of James Hamilton of Finnart in 1540.

James V sent Learmonth as ambassador to England in August 1542 after the battle of Haddon Rig. After taking part in peace negotiations at York, Learmonth went to Greenwich Palace but was not granted an audience with Henry VIII. According to the chronicle of Robert Lindsay of Pitscottie, he carried a secret private letter from James V for Henry, which was "sealed and closed so straitly as could be devised for opening of the same" and Learmonth was to invite Henry VIII to reply in kind.

Learmonth's task in London was to try to persuade Henry VIII to agree to a future meeting with James V at York. Although Pitscottie's story of letter may be doubtful, Learmonth discussed secret or private instructions and went to London. Henry VIII conceived a good opinion of Learmonth at this time.

Learmonth had returned to England on 17 September 1542 with the Bishop of Orkney and Lord Erskine for more talks with the Duke of Norfolk at York. They discussed plans for a meeting between Henry and James and Scotland's continuing "auld alliance" with France. According to the English diplomats, Learmonth said that James's intentions differed from their official commission, which had regard to his honour as a king, "who regards outwardly his honour in his open commission and in secret instruction declares his inward heart". As a point of honour, James was reluctant to come to London, and was more willing to have the meeting at York or Newcastle. The English diplomats offered to send a copy of Learmonth's "secret instruction" to Henry VIII. The Scottish diplomats also reported that Mary of Guise was pregnant and would "take to her chamber" at Linlithgow Palace at Michaelmas (29 September). They thought James V would not come to England for a meeting during his wife's pregnancy.

As the Scottish diplomats at York held a conjoint commission, Learmonth was not allowed to return to Scotland on his own to speak with James V in early October 1542. Learmonth told the Duke of Norfolk that James V would have spoken to him at Coldstream to serve justice on border reivers. Learmonth went to London, hoping to meet Henry VIII. He was refused an audience at Greenwich Palace and after two days allowed to speak to the Privy Council. The two Scottish diplomats at York remained inactive and hesitated to open new letters brought by a Scottish herald. George Buchanan claims that Learmonth was forced to return from the talks as the Duke of Norfolk's raid began (on 22 October 1542).

James Learmonth was a witness to a legal instrument made at Falkland Palace in December 1542 on the death of James V, which purported to make Cardinal Beaton as Regent or Governor of Scotland.

He was sent as a diplomat to England by Regent Arran in March 1543 with William Hamilton and Henry Balnaves. Their mission was to discuss the marriage of Mary, Queen of Scots, and Prince Edward. Learmonth was a commissioner for the 1543 Treaty of Greenwich.

In July 1543, Henry VIII hoped that Learmonth would be among a council of his supporters in Scotland. In the same month, Regent Arran sent Learmonth to negotiate with his factional opponents at Linlithgow. Their "Secret Bond" led to the removal of Mary, Queen of Scots to Stirling Castle.

Learmonth was killed fighting the English at the battle of Pinkie in September 1547.
