= Learmonth (noble family) =

Noble family from Fife, Scotland

Learmonth Learmouth
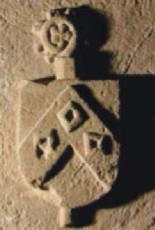
- The Arms of Prior George Learmonth, Pluscarden Abbey of Benedictines, Elgin, Morayshire, Scotland
- Country: Kingdom of Scotland

Learmonth is the name of a noble family of Scottish origin from Fife in Scotland. The name Leirmont was among Malcolm III's supporters described for the first time by Hector Boece in his "Scotorum historiae a prima gentis origine" printed in Paris in 1527:

Ili primi fuere comites quorum nostri meminerunt anales. Multarum nova cognomia Scotorum familiis indita, Calder, Locart, Gordon, Setoun, Gallora, Laudir, Wawaim, Meldrun, Shaw, Leirmaont, Libert, Straquhyn, Cargil, Ratra, Doundas, Cocburn, Mar, Menzees, Abbercromme, Lesbei, Myrtoun multaque alia praediorum nomina, quibus viri fortes a rege donati in munerum concessere cognomina.""

— Hector Boece, Scotorum historiae a prima gentis origine, 1527 "Scotorum Historia".

According to Boece, Leirmont came from England, among Knights that were sent by Edward the Confessor to support Malcolm in his war with Macbeth to regain his rightful place at King of Scotland. These knights were rewarded with land including Scots border locations named East and West Learmouth. First mention in Fife, Scotland about year 1400 as an individual name Learmont, due to documents from Collection of Sir Robert Douglas of Glenbervie that Learmont was the Laird of Earlston (Earlstone).

== History ==
The Learmonths were an ancient and respectable Scottish noble family. By the sixteenth century the Learmonths had become a powerful clan in eastern Scotland, especially in the region of Fife.

== James Learmonth of Dairsie, Master Household ==
James Learmonth of Dairsie was Master of Household to James V of Scotland. He was involved in the arrest of James Hamilton of Finnart in 1540. The king sent Learmonth as ambassador to England in August 1542 after the battle of Haddon Rig. After taking part in peace negotiations at York, Learmonth went to Greenwich Palace but was not granted an audience with Henry VIII. According to the chronicle of Robert Lindsay of Pitscottie, he carried a secret private letter from James V for Henry.

James Learmonth was a witness to a legal instrument made at Falkland Palace on the death of James V, which purported to make Cardinal Beaton as Regent or Governor of Scotland. He was a commissioner for the 1543 Treaty of Greenwich, and killed at the battle of Pinkie in 1547.

== Russia and Sweden ==
James Spens who was the son of David Spens and Margaret Learmonth, and James Spens made serious efforts to hire his own kinsmen, including the Learmonths. In the sixteenth and seventeenth centuries many Learmonths served abroad in Continental armies, including those of Sweden, Poland–Lithuania, and Russia. In the mid-sixteenth century Michael Learmonth became one of the first Scots to attempt to recruit Scottish soldiers for Sweden. It is therefore no surprise to find several Learmonths serving as officers under James Spens's command in the Swedish army. Among those officers was George Learmonth's outstanding kinsman, Peter Learmonth, who has occasionally been misidentified as the founder of the Lermontov family.

According to Chester S.L. Dunning's fundamental story about the Russia's Time of Troubles (Smuta) in 1598–1613, Peter Learmonth entered Swedish service in 1603 as an ensign, and he rose through the ranks in Colonel James Spens’s regiment. In 1610 Peter Learmonth served as a captain in the Swedish army that was invited by Tsar Vasilii Shuiskii to enter Russia to oppose Polish military intervention. At the battle of Klushino in June 1610 the large Swedish and Russian armies were decisively defeated by a small Polish army. After the battle, over 1500 foreign mercenary soldiers transferred their allegiance to the king of Poland–Lithuania, Sigismund III. In 1619 King Sigismund III rewarded the ‘noble’ and ‘brave’ Scot with a hereditary estate.

In 1632 a new formation cavalry regiment was formed composed of approximately 2000 Russian dvoriane (provincial noblemen) and deti boiarskie (petty gentry) under the command of a high-ranking foreign general.50 Among the officers chosen to train this new cavalry regiment was Lieutenant Iurii Lermont, who was promoted to the rank of captain and given the astronomically high salary of 100 rubles per month. Also joining the same new formation cavalry regiment were two newly arrived kinsmen of Iurii Lermont– John and Thomas Learmonth. Captain Iurii Lermont was given command of a company of 200 cavalrymen, mostly Russian provincial nobles and petty gentry, along with some foreigners who had recently converted to Russian Orthodox Christianity.

== Notable members ==
- George-Yuri Andreevich Learmonth (1590ths – 1633) was a Scottish soldier in Russian service, paternal ancestor of the Lermontov's family.
