= Secret Bond =

Scottish document drawn up on 24 July 1543

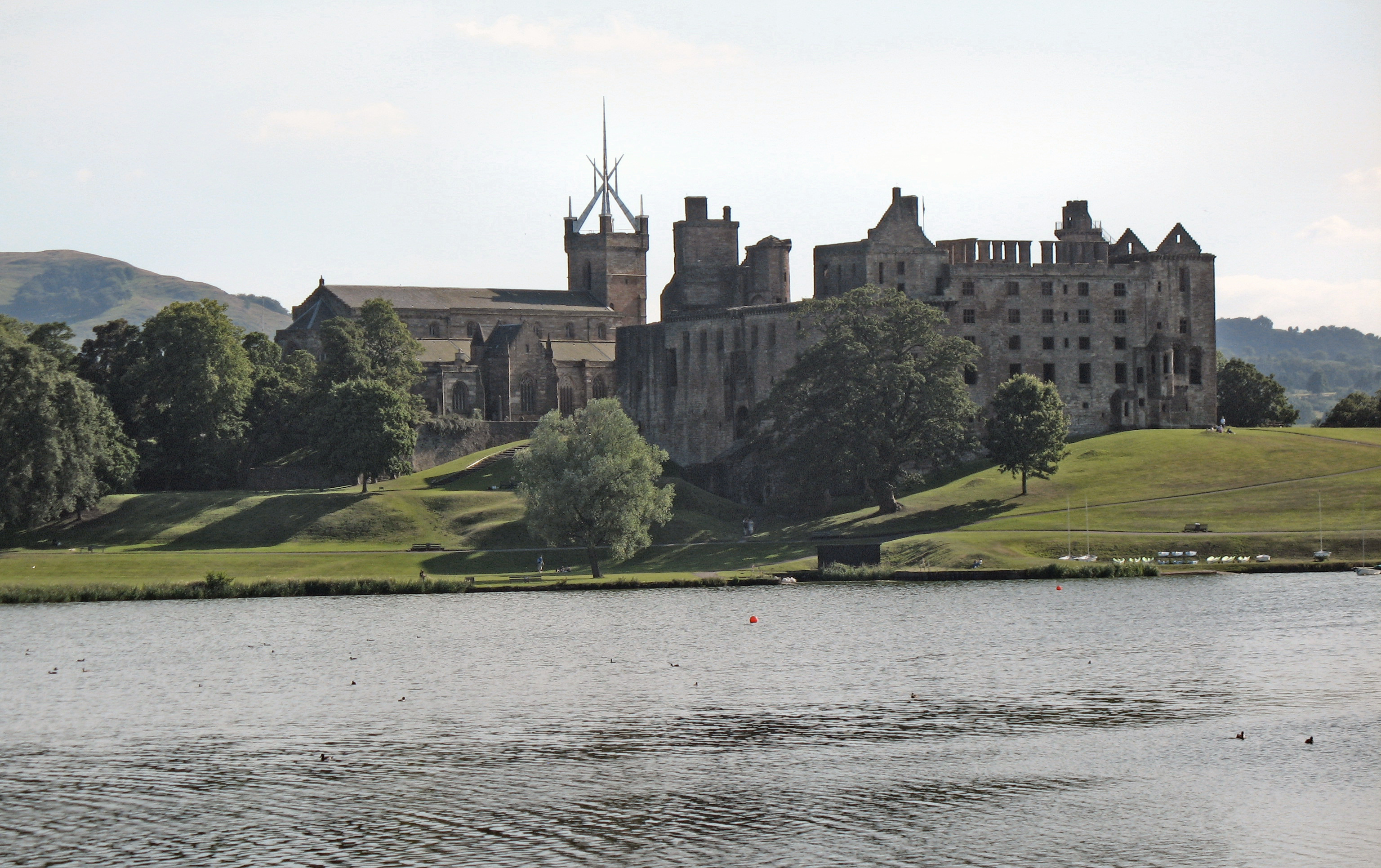
An army gathered around Linlithgow Palace in July 1543

The Secret Bond (also known as the Secret Band) was a document drawn up by Cardinal Beaton and signed at Linlithgow by a number of Scottish peers and lairds on 24 July 1543. They agreed to prevent the marriage of Mary, Queen of Scots, to Prince Edward of England. The document is sometimes called the "Linlithgow Bond". After an agreement was reached with the Governor of Scotland, Regent Arran, Mary moved from Linlithgow Palace to Stirling Castle.

== Historical context ==
Following the death of James V of Scotland in December 1542, his infant daughter, Mary, Queen of Scots, succeeded to the Scottish throne. A struggle for the Regency of Scotland between Cardinal Beaton and the Earl of Arran was won by the latter. On 1 July 1543, Regent Arran entered into the Treaty of Greenwich with Henry VIII of England. Under the treaty, Mary would marry Henry's son, Edward. The alliance and eventual union of the thrones of England and Scotland which the treaty envisaged was controversial in Scotland. Some thought the union might only enrich England. The treaty's Anglo-centric policy was resisted by many who preferred to continue the Auld Alliance with France.

Mary remained with her mother Mary of Guise at Linlithgow Palace, where she had been born. She was nursed in Mary of Guise's own chamber, five rockers looked after her cradle. When Mary of Guise made arrangements to move to Stirling Castle in February 1543, Arran would not allow it. Opponents of the marriage continued to worry that Mary would be taken to England. After a rumour Mary would be taken to France, Regent Arran increased security at Linlithgow Palace. Shots were fired at the English ambassador Ralph Sadler.

Mary of Guise seems to have been in control of the situation. She wrote to an ally, David Paniter, on 12 July, saying that she expected to agree with the Governor, Regent Arran, about a move to Stirling. After arriving at Stirling, Mary of Guise wrote to her mother, Antoinette of Bourbon, Duchess of Guise, in positive terms about the situation in Scotland. The Duchess replied that she rejoiced to hear that her daughter and the little queen were in good health and their long captivity was over.

== Two armies ==
According to the Scottish chronicle writer Robert Lindsay of Pitscottie, Cardinal Beaton and Mary of Guise persuaded the Earl of Argyll to raise an army of Highlandmen and men from the Mearns. The force assembled at Linlithgow to prevent Regent Arran taking Mary away. They stayed long enough to devastate the cornfields around the town, "thair oist in Linlythgow quha lay thair so lang that they distroyit the haill cornis around the towne bayth of pure and riche the space of ane myll round about" ― their host in Linlithgow who lay there so long that they destroyed the whole corns around the town both of the poor and rich the space of a mile round about. This also appears in David Lindsay's poem, The Tragedie of Cardinal Beaton:

The Governour purposyng to subdew
I rasit ane oyst of mony bold Baroun
And maid ane raid quhilk Lythgow yit may rew;
For we distroyit ane myle about the town

Meanwhile, Arran's forces gathered in Edinburgh. Ralph Sadler estimated that the Cardinal's party had as many as 5 or 6,000 men at Linlithgow, while Regent Arran's strength at Edinburgh was 7 or 8,000. Arran sent James Learmonth of Dairsie, Henry Balnaves, and Adam Otterburn to negotiate at Linlithgow.

== The Secret Bond ==
On 24 July 1543, when Mary was to be moved from Linlithgow Palace to Stirling Castle, the leaders of the Scottish-French party signed a bond drawn up by Cardinal Beaton. The notary who penned the original document was John Lauder. The signatories pledged themselves to resist the marriage and the realm being "swbdewit till our awld enymyis of Ingland" by the transport of Mary to England. The signatories included Beaton, a number of churchmen, and these lords and lairds:

- George Gordon, 4th Earl of Huntly
- Archibald Campbell, 4th Earl of Argyll
- Matthew Stewart, 4th Earl of Lennox
- Patrick Hepburn, 3rd Earl of Bothwell
- John Gordon, 11th Earl of Sutherland
- William Graham, 3rd Earl of Menteith
- John Erskine, 5th Lord Erskine
- William Ruthven, 2nd Lord Ruthven
- Malcolm Fleming, 3rd Lord Fleming
- William Crichton, 5th Lord Crichton of Sanquhar
- David Drummond, 2nd Lord Drummond
- John Lyle, 4th Lord Lyle
- George Home, 4th Lord Home
- William Abernethy, 5th Lord Saltoun
- Hugh Fraser, Master of Lovat
- William, Master of Forbes
- John Campbell of Cawdor
- John Campbell of Lundie
- Walter Scott of Buccleuch
- Walter Ker of Cessford
- William Murray of Tullibardine
- Mark Kerr
- John Cunningham of Caprington
- Robert Douglas of Lochleven.
- Walter Ogilvie of Dunlugus
- James Stirling of Keir
- John Ross of Craigie
- James Kennedy of Blairquhan.
- William Edmondstone of Duntreath
- John Leslie of Balquhain
- James Grant of Freuchie
- George Gordon of Schivas
- John Colquhoun of Luss
- George Buchanan of that ilk.

== Mediation at Kirkliston ==
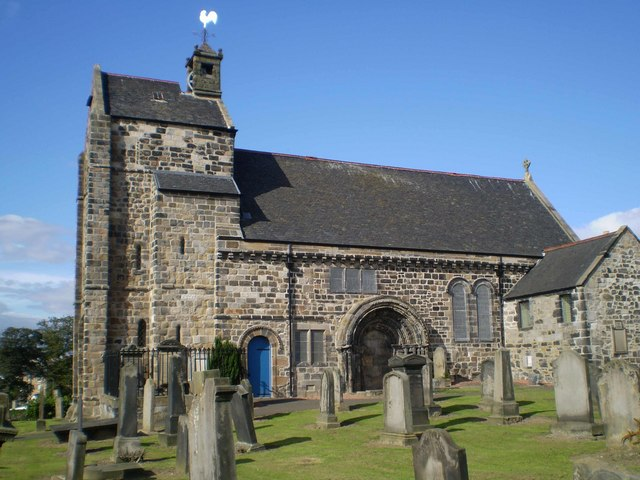
Mary's immediate future was determined during mediation at Kirkliston

In England, William Parr collected conflicting intelligence reports and he heard on 22 July that Regent Arran and the opposition might fight a battle near Linlithgow, or that Arran might be persuaded to join their cause and change his policies. Ralph Sadler wrote:

Surely, here is great appearance of much mischief and rebellion, for great preparation is on both parties; the Cardinal, the Earls of Argyll, Lennox, Huntly, with their friends, of one party, and the Governor [Regent Arran], the Earls of Angus, Cassilis, the Lord Maxwell, and their friends, of the other party. What will be the end, I cannot yet tell; but, if I should say my own phantasy, I think surely, when all is done, they will not fight, for all their brags.

Meanwhile, Sadler was collecting signatures to another bond, Henry VIII's "secret device", an undertaking that some Scottish nobles would support the English marriage plan regardless of the Scottish politics of the moment. He later wrote to Parr, explaining that he ought not to fully trust information from the spies he employed in Scotland.

Around the time the secret bond was made, the two opposing factions met for talks. Pitscottie and George Buchanan say the mediation was made at Kirkliston. Ralph Sadler described two meetings in the "middle waye betwene Edenburgh and Lythcoo".

The two sides made an agreement at Kirkliston which was enacted on 25 July 1543 by a mass meeting for reconciliation in a field between Edinburgh and Linlithgow with "shaking of hands" and "friendly embracings". This ceremony was described by Ralph Sadler in a letter to Henry VIII:

it was agreed that the said Cardinal and his complices, with the nombre of oone hundreth persons and th'erle of Anguysshe with such other barons as were nowe with the Governor [Regent Arran] with the like nombre of oone hundreth persons shulde mete altogither in the feeldes betwene this towne [Edinburgh] and Lythcoo, and so to talk famyliarly togither like freends ... there was shaking of hands one with another, freendlie embracings and familiar communications and verie good agreament amongst them

== Mary moves to Stirling ==
On completion of this peace making, the Earls of Cassilis and Glencairn rode to Linlithgow Palace to order the household appointed for the queen by Regent Arran to stand down. Four governors or neutral lords previously appointed by Parliament (on 15 March) as Mary's keepers took charge at the Palace, and on the next day, 26 or 27 July, Mary and her mother Mary of Guise moved from Linlithgow to the relative security of Stirling Castle. The Earl of Lennox with foot and mounted soldiers, escorted Guise and her daughter to Stirling. Twenty four horses transported the luggage, including Mary's cradle, a great bed and the beds of the ladies in waiting, and nineteen horses carried the kitchen and baking equipment.

Regent Arran's eldest son, James Hamilton, was sent to St Andrews Castle as the Regent's pledge or hostage to Cardinal Beaton under the terms of the agreements made at Kirkliston. According to Ralph Sadler, the four keepers of Mary at Stirling Castle (Lords Erskine, Fleming, Livingston, and Ruthven) refused to allow Cardinal Beaton to stay in the castle with the queen. An agreement was also made for Cardinal Beaton to have a say in a termly rotation of the four lords keeper of the queen.

Ralph Sadler offered an explanation for the move to Stirling, explaining that the households of the four keepers could not all be accommodated at Linlithgow, because "the house of Lythcoo is so lytell". The remark may have intended to reassure Henry VIII that all was well with his plans. As Marcus Merriman suggested, the move may instead indicate Regent Arran's waning hopes for Mary's English marriage.

== A developing situation ==
In August, Ralph Sadler obtained a copy of the "secret bond" or "band" made at Linlithgow from a Scottish spy and forwarded it to Henry VIII, drawing the king's attention to the signatories. The significance was that some of those who signed had been captured at the battle of Solway Moss and made pledges to Henry VIII, or had previously made "assurances" of their support for English policy. Sadler also showed the bond to Regent Arran, who said he was unaware of it. Sadler described the bond as Cardinal Beaton's sole work, his "only act and device".

Sadler went to Stirling, and reported to Henry VIII that:

"(Mary of Guise) is very glad that she is at Stirling, and much she praised the air about the house, and told me, "That her daughter did grow apace; and soon," she said, "she would be a woman, if she took of her mother;" who indeed, is of the largest stature of women. And therefore she caused also the child to be brought to me, to the intent I might see her, assuring your majesty, that she is a right fair and goodly child, as any that I have seen for her age.

Mary was crowned at Stirling Castle on 9 September 1543. By this time, Arran had changed his position, renouncing religious reform and pro-English policy, and was now aligned with the signatories of the Cardinal's secret bond.

== War and rivalry ==
Henry VIII, understanding the reversal of Scottish policy, had, before the end of September 1543, made plans to invade Scotland and waste the countryside to the gates of Edinburgh. His advisors and military experts in the north of England argued against starting before winter, and suggested some cross-border raids.

On 15 December 1543, the Parliament of Scotland rejected the Treaty of Greenwich and other treaties with England. Scotland's rejection of the treaty and its pursuit of a French alliance led to the war known the Rough Wooing, Henry VIII's attempt to impose his matrimonial policy by force, which lasted until the Treaty of Norham in 1551. The first major action was the Burning of Edinburgh in May 1544.

After the English invading army left Scotland, Arran's regency was challenged at a council meeting and convention in Stirling on 29 May 1544 which continued in June in the frater of the Grey Friars, and for a time Mary of Guise was acknowledged as Regent by her allies. She began to mint four penny bawbees at Stirling with her insignia. Arran gained control of Edinburgh. Arran and Guise held rival parliaments in November, but she was forced to concede her claim to the regency to Arran.

== Historians and the secret bond ==
John Knox included a slightly different version of these events in his History of Reformation. He described Cardinal Beaton meeting his allies at Linlithgow, to "raise a party against the Governor, and against such as stood fast at (supported) the marriage and peace with England". He does not mention the negotiations or the reconciliation, and wrote that the Cardinal's party escorted Mary and her mother to Stirling, not the four lords chosen by Parliament. John Lesley attributed the controversy at Linlithgow to the Earl of Lennox and also wrote that the Cardinal's party conveyed Mary to Stirling. Mary's secretary Claude Nau emphasised the role of Lennox and described the enduring enmity of his family and the Hamiltons. A brief summary in the chronicle A Diurnal of Remarkable Occurents may be more accurate.

The conflict and the "secret band" were described by the historian David Hay Fleming who used contemporary letters first published in 1890 in the Hamilton Papers. Douglas Hamer gave a summary in his notes on Lindsay's Tragedie of Cardinal Beaton. Rosalind K. Marshall emphasises that Mary of Guise gained an advantage and increased power by the move to Stirling, especially because she was the owner of Stirling Castle. John Guy gives Mary of Guise a more active and central role in these events.
