= Nadezhda Lermontova =

Russian Soviet painter and set designer (1885–1921)

- Надежда Лермонтова
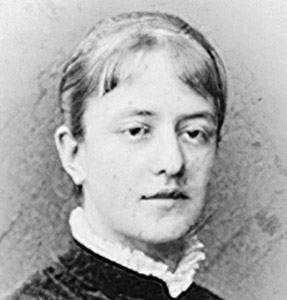
- Lermontova before 1921
- Born: Nadezhda Vladimirovna Lermontova; 1885; Saint Petersburg, Saint Petersburg Governorate, Russian Empire
- Died: 1921 (aged 35–36); Petrograd, Russian SFSR, Soviet Union
- Education: Zvantseva School of Drawing and Painting
- Occupations: Painter; set designer
- Relatives: Mikhail Lermontov (great-uncle)
- Family: Lermontov family

Nadezhda Vladimirovna Lermontova (Russian: Надежда Владимировна Лермонтова; 1885 – 1921) was a Russian and Soviet painter and set designer.

== Early life and education ==
Lermontova was born in Saint Petersburg, Saint Petersburg Governorate (present-day Russia) in 1885 to Vladimir Vladimirovich Lermontov, an experimental physicist, lecturer at Saint Petersburg Imperial University and member of the Lermontov family. Through her father Lermontova was the great-niece of the poet Mikhail Lermontov.

From 1907 to 1910, Lermontova stuided under Léon Bakst at the Zvantseva School of Drawing and Painting.

== Career ==
Lermontova's oeuvre merged elements from the Modernist and Symbolist movements. Her colours carried the luminosity and purity which was taught by Bakst at the Zvantseva School. During her short art career, she corresponded with Bakst, who encouraged her, writing "Believe in yourself, but equally, be ruthless and demanding of yourself. Above all, seek to express your thoughts clearly. I wish you the best of luck!" After Bakst left Zvantseva in 1910, Lermontova was among the students who were in opposition to the teaching methods of Kuzma Petrov-Vodkin. She and several other students left the school, rented a studio, and worked independently. They hosted soirées, took field trips to neighboring towns, and held life drawing sessions. She exhibited her work from 1911 on, participating in exhibitions by the Union of Youth (Soyuz Molodezhi) in 1911 and 1912.

Her 1910s painting On the Sofa: Self-Portrait is perhaps her best known work. It is on display at the State Russian Museum.

In St. Petersburg, she was a set designer for theatre productions.

With Kuzma Petrov-Vodkin, she created paintings for the church at Ovruch, Ukraine.

== Personal life ==
Lermontova died in 1921 in Petrograd, Russian SFSR (present-day Saint Petersburg, Russia).

== Gallery ==
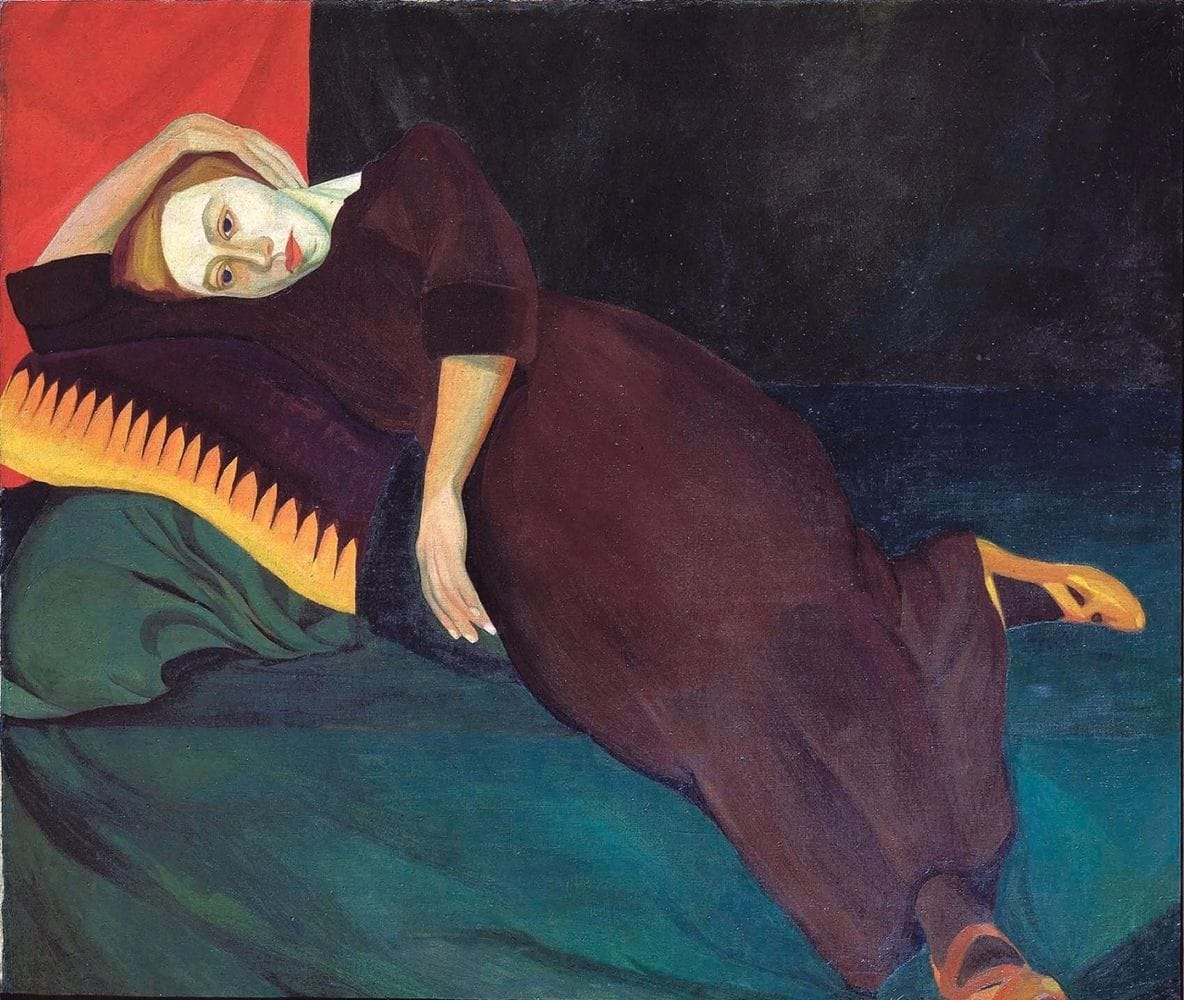
On the divan

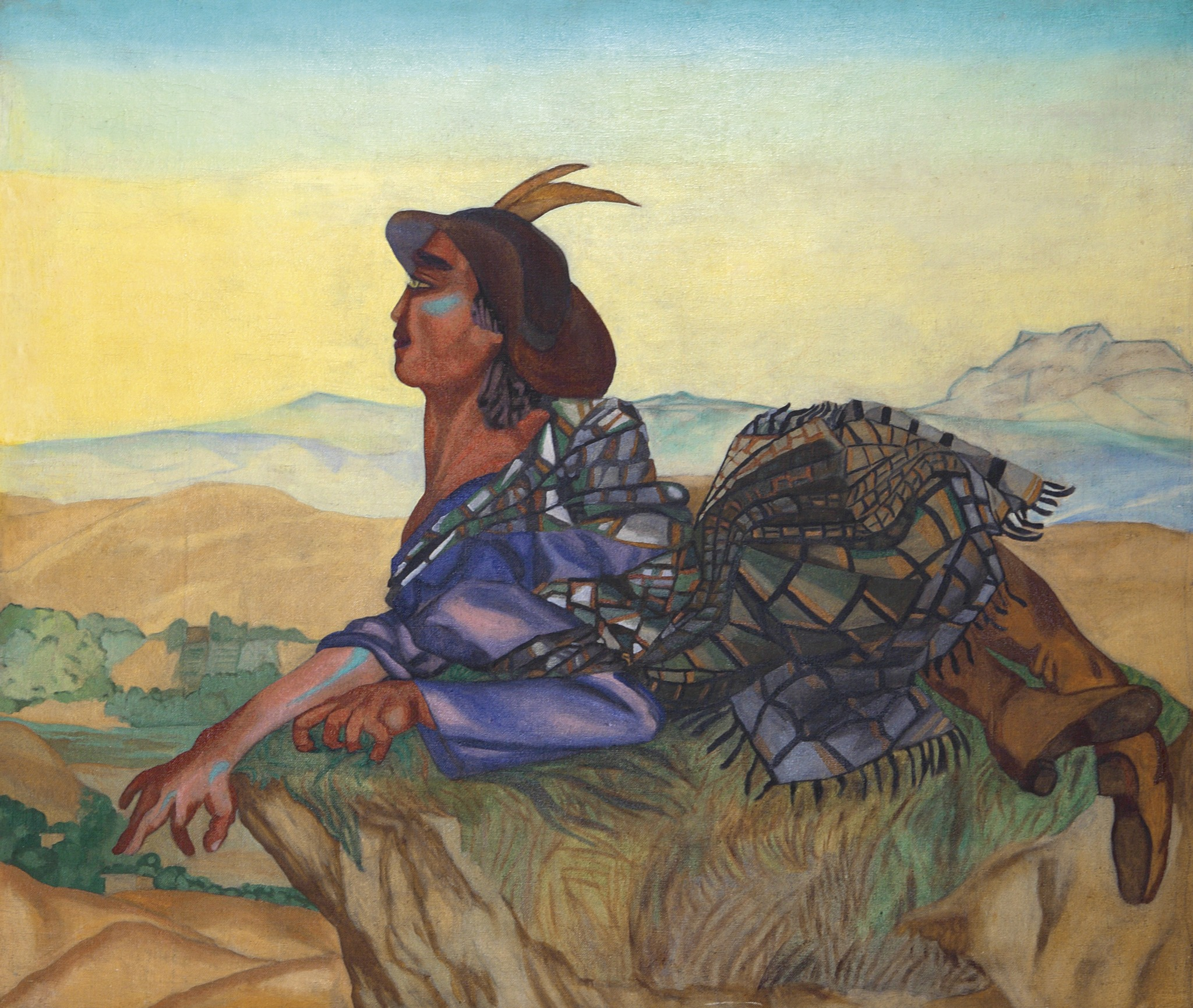
Sphinx

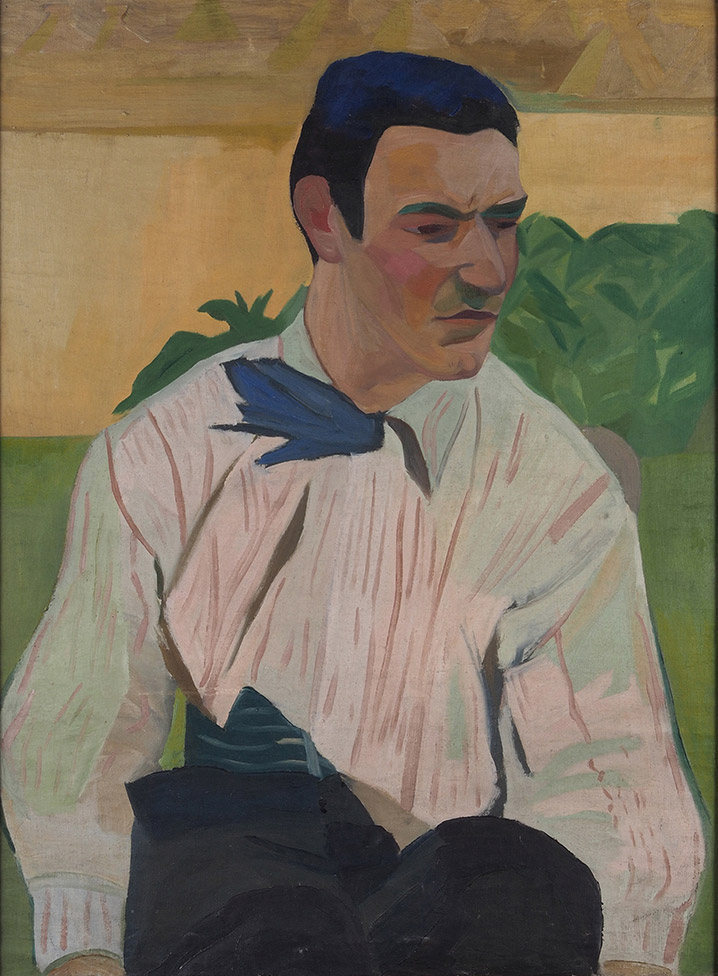
Portrait of Sergei Solovyov

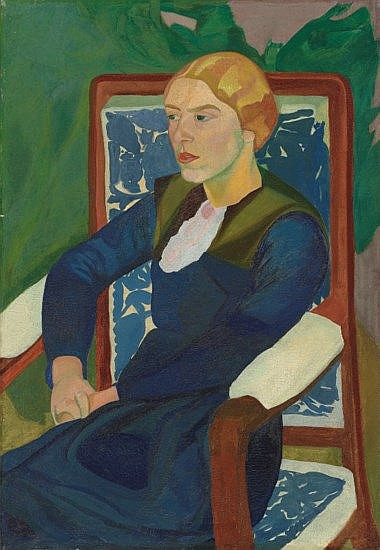
Portrait of Varvara Klimovich-Toper
