= Dairsie Hoard =

Hoard of Roman hacksilver found in Scotland

Coordinates: 56°20′48.38″N 2°56′44.79″W

The Dairsie Hoard is a hoard of late 3rd-century Roman hacksilver that was found near Dairsie, Fife, Scotland, in 2014 by a teenage boy, David Hall, at a metal-detecting rally. The hoard comprises over 300 pieces of silver, including fragments of at least four vessels. The artifacts were on display at the National Museum of Scotland in Edinburgh between October 2017 and February 2018. Fraser Hunter, principal curator at National Museums Scotland stated that the hacksilver may have been a gift or payment to local Pictish tribes by the Roman army.
