= Dairsie =

Village located in North-East Fife, Scotland

Coordinates: 56°20′40″N 2°57′00″W

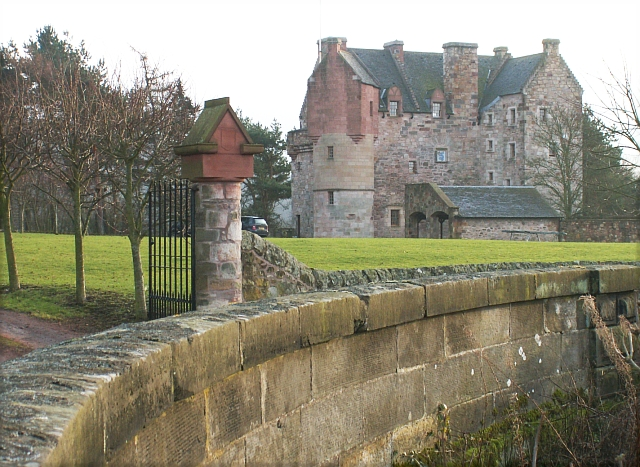
Dairsie Castle

Dairsie, or Osnaburgh (Scottish Gaelic: Dàirsidh), is a village and parish in north-east Fife, Scotland. It is three miles (five kilometres) south-southwest of Leuchars Junction, and three miles (five kilometres) east-northeast of Cupar on the A91 Stirling to St Andrews road. The village grew out of two smaller settlements (called Dairsiemuir and Osnaburgh), and developed principally around the industry of weaving. Since the late twentieth century it has become a dormitory settlement for nearby towns.

The village may have derived its name of Osnaburgh from weaving osnaburg, a coarse linen or cotton, originally imported from Osnabrück in Germany.

The civil parish has a population of 387 (in 2011).

Local businesses include a small Village Shop and Post Office, a Petrol Station and Garage (also selling second hand vehicles) and The Dairsie Inn, recently trading as Rumbledethumps Restaurant but currently closed. It has a small locals bar, a conservatory restaurant and a small function room / additional restaurant.

== Historic buildings ==
Dairsie Bridge, one mile (1.5 kilometres) south of the village, dates from the early sixteenth century, although it has been modified since. Nearby Dairsie Castle (now restored) dates from the early seventeenth century, and was briefly the residence of John Spottiswoode (1565–1639), Archbishop of St Andrews.

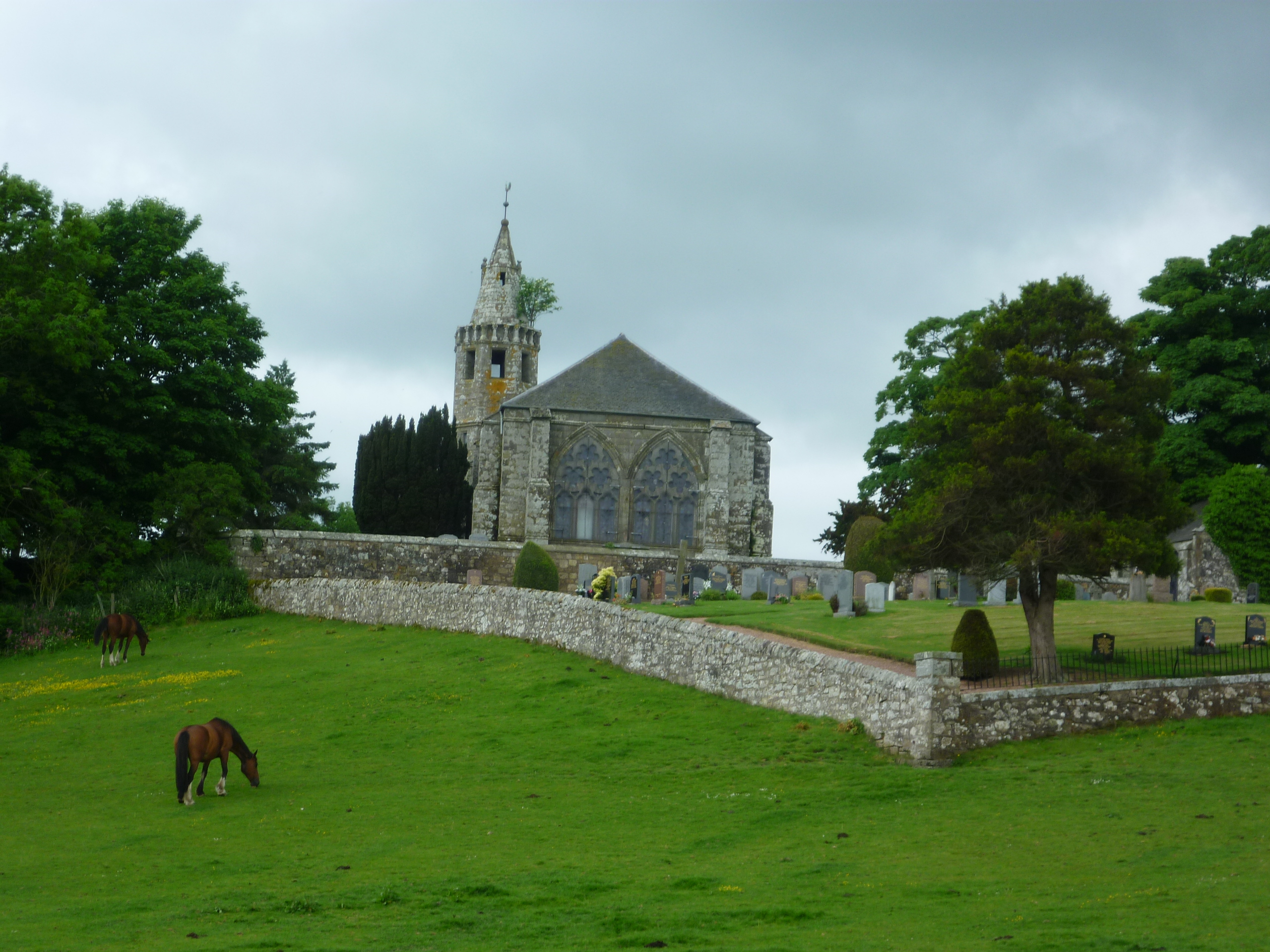
Dairsie Old Parish Church

King James VI stayed at Dairsie Castle following his escape from the Raid of Ruthven in June 1583. James Melville of Halhill wrote that he lodged in the "auld Inns" at Dairsie, which was not as secure as Falkland Palace.

St Mary's Church was built by Archbishop Spottiswoode in 1621. The church is some distance from the village and ceased to be used for worship in 1966. It is now in private hands, the parish worshippers were using the former St Leonard's Church in the village. This, however, has now been sold into private hands. The congregation is united with St John's Church in Cupar.

== History ==
In 2014 a hoard of Roman hacksilver was found in a field at Dairsie. It is thought that the hacksilver was used by Roman soldiers to pay off the local Pictish tribes when they travelled through the area.

== Notable people ==
- Rev Patrick Scougal (later Bishop of Aberdeen) was parish minister 1636 to 1645
