= Auchterlonie =

Family name

Auchterlonie or Ouchterlony, Scottish surname from Forfar in the county of Angus, may refer to:

- Dorothy Auchterlonie (1915–1991), academic
- Laurie Auchterlonie (1868–1948), golfer
- William Auchterlonie (1872–1963), golfer
- James Auchterlony, a soldier in Regiment of Jacob Shaw, in Russian service from 1610th. In 1672 James Auchterlony served as a witness to the will of Alexander 11th Lord Forbes in Stockholm.
- Örjan Ouchterlony (1914–2004) was a Swedish bacteriologist and immunologist who is credited with the creation of the Ouchterlony double immuno diffusion test in the 1940s.
- Ouchterlony, Swedish noble family of Scottish origin. Descents of John Ouchterlony († 1778), from Dundee in Scotland.
