= Khomutov family (Tula) =

Russian noble family

Khomutov Хомутовы
- noble family
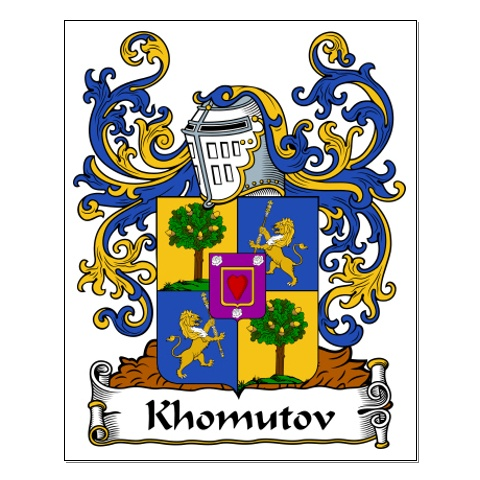
- Parent house: Clan Hamilton
- Country: Russian Empire
- Founded: 17th century
- Founder: Thomas Hamilton

The Khomutov family (Russian: Хомутовы) is the name of a Russian noble family of Scottish origin.

== History ==
According to the family's genealogy they are descended from Thomas Hamilton, who first entered the service to the Polish–Lithuanian Commonwealth and later became a soldier in Russia. He had a son named Petr (David) Homutov.

== Notable members ==
- Mikhail Khomutov (1795—1864) was a general of cavalry, adjutant general and an earl (Hаказной атаман) of the Don Cossacks in 1848–1862.
- Anna Khomutova (1787, Moscow – 1858, Saint Petersburg), Russian writer, sister of Michail G. Khomutov. Cousin of Ivan Kozlov.
