= Artamonov =

Artamonov (masculine) or Artamonova (feminine) is a Russian patronymic surname literally meaning "son of Artamon". It belongs to Artamonov noble family of Scottish origin.

Notable people with the surname include:

== People ==
- Aleksey Artamonov (1916–1941), Soviet pilot and Hero of the Soviet Union
- Anatoly Dmitriyevich Artamonov (born 1952), Governor of Kaluga Oblast, Russia
- Anna Artamonova
- Igor Artamonov
- Inga Artamonova (1936–1966), Soviet speed skater, the first four-time Allround World Champion in women's speed skating history
- Leonid Artamonov (1859–1932), Russian military engineer, general, writer, geographer and explorer
- Mikhail Artamonov (1898–1972), Soviet historian and archaeologist
- Natalya Artamonova-Kurova
- Nikolay Artamonov (1906–1965), Soviet rocket scientist
- Nikolay D. Artamonov (1840–1918), military geodesist, member of Russian Astronomical Society, Chief of the Corps of Military Topographers of the Russian Imperial Army
- Olga Artamonova
- Yevgeniya Artamonova (born 1975), Russian volleyball player, who was a member of the Olympic medal winning national team
- Catena Artamonov, chain of craters on the Moon located near Artamonov crater
- Valentina Artamonova (born 1960), Russian politician

== Fictional characters ==
- Protagonists in:
  - The Artamonov Business, a 1925 novel by Maxim Gorky
  - The Artamonov Business (film), a 1941 film based on the novel
