= Dairsie Bridge =

Bridge in fife, Scotland

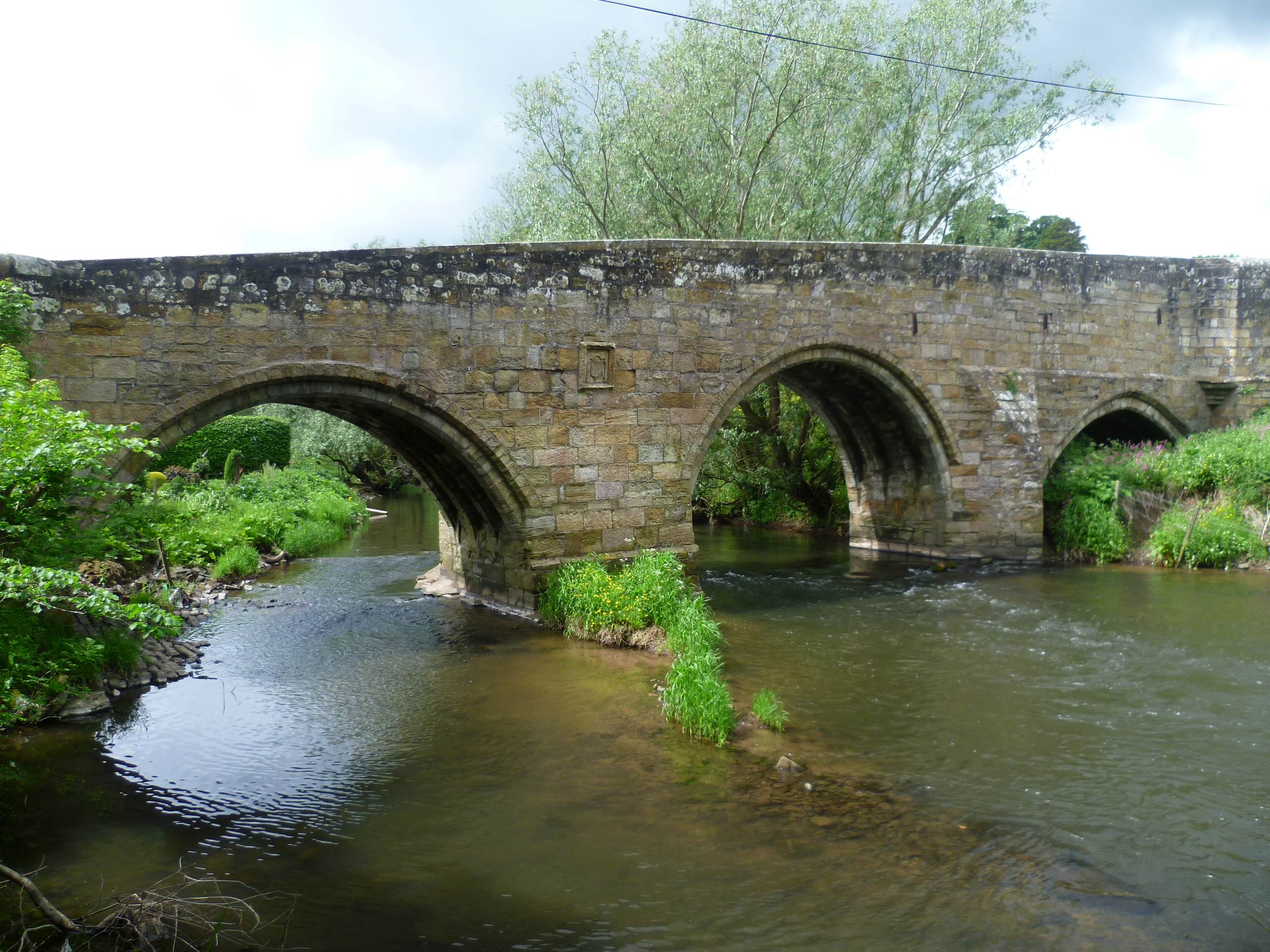
- Dairsie Bridge, viewed from downstream
- Coordinates: 56°20′01″N 2°56′47″W
- OS grid reference: NO415161
- Crosses: River Eden
- Locale: Fife

History
- Opened: Early 16th century

Listed Building – Category A
- Official name: Dairsie Bridge over River Eden
- Designated: 1 March 1984
- Reference no.: LB2607

Location
- Interactive map of Dairsie Bridge

Dairsie Bridge is a 16th-century stone bridge, located 1.2 kilometres (0.75 mi) south of Dairsie, in north-east Fife, Scotland. It carries a minor road across the River Eden, linking the parishes of Dairsie to the north and Kemback to the south. The bridge is protected as a Category A listed building.

== History ==
There was an earlier bridge at Dairsie, as it is recorded that King James IV crossed it on his way from St Andrews to Stirling in 1496.

The present bridge bears an inscribed stone displaying the coat of arms and initials of James Beaton (1473–1539), Archbishop of St Andrews, and it is likely that he ordered the bridge to be built during his episcopate (1522–1539). Nearby Dairsie Castle had been a property of the archbishops of St Andrews until the early 16th century.

The three-arched bridge is 30 metres (98 ft) long and 3.5 metres (11 ft) wide. The Eden flows under the two southern arches, and cutwaters project from the bridge's piers. Only minor alterations, to the parapets and approaches, have been carried out since the bridge's construction.

== See also ==
- List of bridges in Scotland
