= George Learmonth =

Scottish soldier for Russia (c. 1595 – 1633)

- Born: 1590s Fife, Scotland
- Died: 1633; Smolensk, Russia
- Relatives: Clan Learmonth, Lermontovs
- Military career
- Allegiance: Poland–Lithuania; Russia
- Rank: Rittmeister (Russia)
- Conflicts: Smolensk War; Russo-Polish War (1654–1667); Siege of Smolensk (1654); Russo-Swedish War (1656–1658); Siege of Riga (1656)

George Learmonth (Russian: Юрий Андреевич Лермонт, romanized: Yury Andreevich Lermont; 1590s–1633) was a Scottish soldier in Russian service. He entered Russian service in 1613 as the praporshchik (ensign) in Jacob Shaw's Regiment.

At least six former members of the Belaya garrison, including George Learmonth, helped decisively turn back Prince Wladyslaw's troops in intense fighting at Moscow's Arbat Gates of Bely Gorod while defending Moscow against Polish forces. In that battle, Ensign George Learmonth's bravery was on display 'for all to see'. When Lieutenant David Edwards was killed in the defence of Moscow, the Irish soldiers in his company immediately petitioned to have George Learmonth replace him. Newly promoted Lieutenant Learmonth received fifteen rubles per month.

During the Smolensk War (1632–1634), he was Rittmeister of the Russian Reiter regiment of Charles d'Ebert, under the command of Prince Semyon Prozorovsky. He died in battle against the units of Krzysztof Radziwiłł on 30 August 1633.

== Life ==
According to family history, George Learmonth descended from the famed 13th-century poet-prophet Thomas the Rhymer (also known as Thomas Learmonth). George was the brother of Peter-Patrick Learmonth (born about 1596), who was captured by the Poles whilst in Swedish service, fighting in Russian service during the Polish–Russian War. He then entered Polish service and commanded troops at Smolensk and Viazma in 1617/1618. Peter Learmont rejoined the Polish Army in 1648.

George Learmonth was the son of Andrew Learmonth and the great-nephew of George Learmonth of Balcomie, who married before 1545 to Lady Euphene Leslie, a daughter of George Leslie, 4th Earl of Rothes and Margaret Crichton (the daughter of William Crichton, 3rd Lord Crichton). Lady Euphene was a sibling of Norman Leslie (b. c. 1518), who would become well known for the murder of Archbishop of St Andrews and the last Scottish Cardinal David Beaton. No records have survived concerning George's early career, but it is likely that he was swept up in his kinsman James Spens's large-scale recruiting campaign. George Learmonth probably entered Swedish service in 1610. Like Peter Learmonth, George probably served in the large Russian-Swedish army that was decisively defeated by a smaller Polish army at the battle of Klushino in June 1610.

He had three sons: William, Andrey-Henry and Peter, who all served in the Russian army. Their descendants, the Lermontov noble family, included the 19th-century Romantic writer Mikhail Lermontov.
