= Lermontov (Russian nobility) =

Russian noble family of Scottish origin

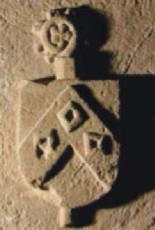
- Parent house: Clan Learmonth
- Country: Russian Empire
- Motto: Sors mea Jesus
- Estates: Tarkhany; Kropotovo-Lermontovo

The Lermontov family (Russian: Лермонтовы) is the name of a Russian noble family of Scottish origin, descended from George Learmonth (known in Russia as Yuri Andreevich Lermont). Family legend has it that he descended from the 13th-century Scottish poet Thomas the Rhymer (also known as Thomas Learmonth).

== Notable members ==
George Learmonth (Russian: Юрий Андреевич Лермонт, romanized: Yuriy Andreyevich Lermont) (1590s–1633), was poruchik in regiment of Captain-Rittmeister Jacob Shaw, during the Smolensk War (1632–1634) and Rittmeister of the Moscouvite Reiters regiment of Charles d'Ebert, under command of Semen Prozorovsky. He died in battle with units of Field Hetman of Lithuania Krzysztof Radziwiłł in August 1633.

Mikhail Lermontov (1814–1841) was a Romantic writer, poet and painter, sometimes called "the poet of the Caucasus", the most important Russian poet after Alexander Pushkin's death in 1837 and the greatest figure in Russian Romanticism. His influence on later Russian literature is still felt in modern times, not only through his poetry, but also through his prose, which founded the tradition of the Russian psychological novel.

Julia Lermontova (1846–1919) was a chemist. She is known as the first Russian female doctor in chemistry, and the third woman to have been given a doctorate in Europe. She studied at the University of Heidelberg and the University of Berlin before she received her doctorate by the University of Göttingen in 1874. She was inducted to the Russian Chemical Society in 1875.

Alexander Mikhailovich Lermontov (1838–1906) was a division commander who served in the Russo-Turkish War (1877–1878).
