= Famintsyn (Russian nobility) =

Russian noble family of Scottish origin

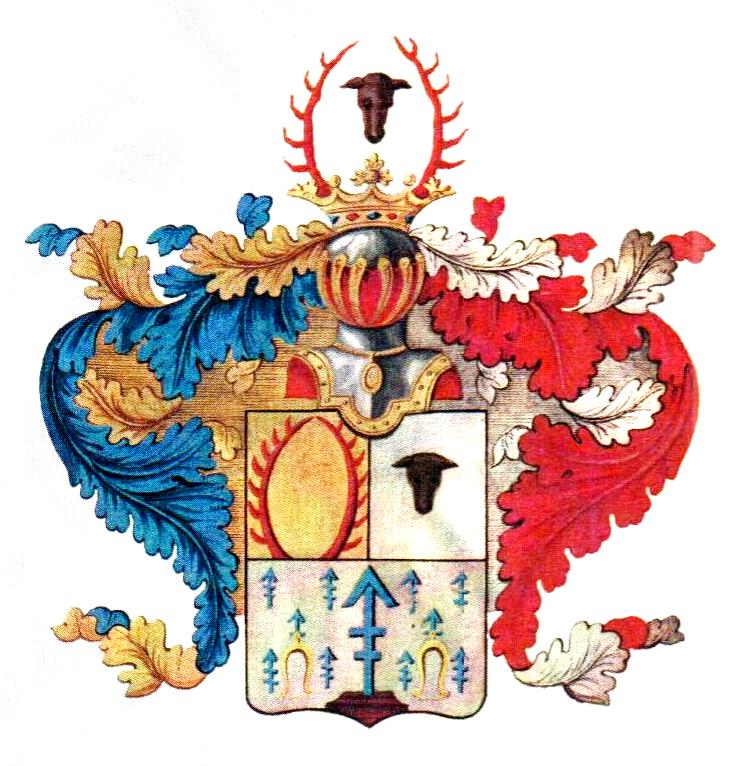
- Parent house: Clan MacThomas
- Country: Russian Empire

The Famintsyn family (Russian: Фаминцыны) is the Russian noble family of Scottish origin. Descendants descents of Kristof Tobias Tomson-Hominsky, first in the service of the Polish–Lithuanian Commonwealth later a soldier in Russian service.

== Notable members ==
- Andrei Famintsyn (Russian: Андрей Серге́евич Фаминцын) (1835, Moscow – 1918, Petrograd) was a Russian botanist, public figure, and academician of the Petersburg Academy of Sciences (1884). Grand-grand-grandson of Egor Famintsyn, an Ober-Commandant of the Petropavlovkaya Fortress.
- Alexander Famitsin (Russian: Александр Сергеевич Фаминцын, (1841 — 1896) was a renowned Russian musical writer, critic and musicologist, professor at Saint Petersburg Conservatory, pupil of Ignaz Moscheles, Moritz Hauptmann and Ernst Richter and friend of Alexander Serov.
