= Irish Russians =

Russian people of Irish descent

Irish Russians are Russian nationals whose ancestry originates wholly or partly in Ireland. Migration occurred in the context of conflicts in Eastern Europe: the Polish–Muscovite War (1605–18), Ingrian War, and Thirty Years' War.

The 2021 Russian census recorded 85 citizens who claimed to be ethnic Irish, while 25 persons even claimed Irish as their native language, mostly in Moscow.

== History ==
The first known Irish people who resided in Russia were part of a company that, during the Polish–Russian War (1609–1618), was part of a regiment under the command of Wilim Grim. Later, captain-Rittmeister Jacob Shaw switched sides. In 1614 they left the fortress of Bely to join Russian forces. The regiment participated in several Russo-Crimean Wars against the Crimean–Nogai raids. In 1626, all foreign mercenaries received Russian names, and after converting to Orthodox Christianity they received material benefits (typically lands with serfs or rubles and clothes).

== Notable people ==
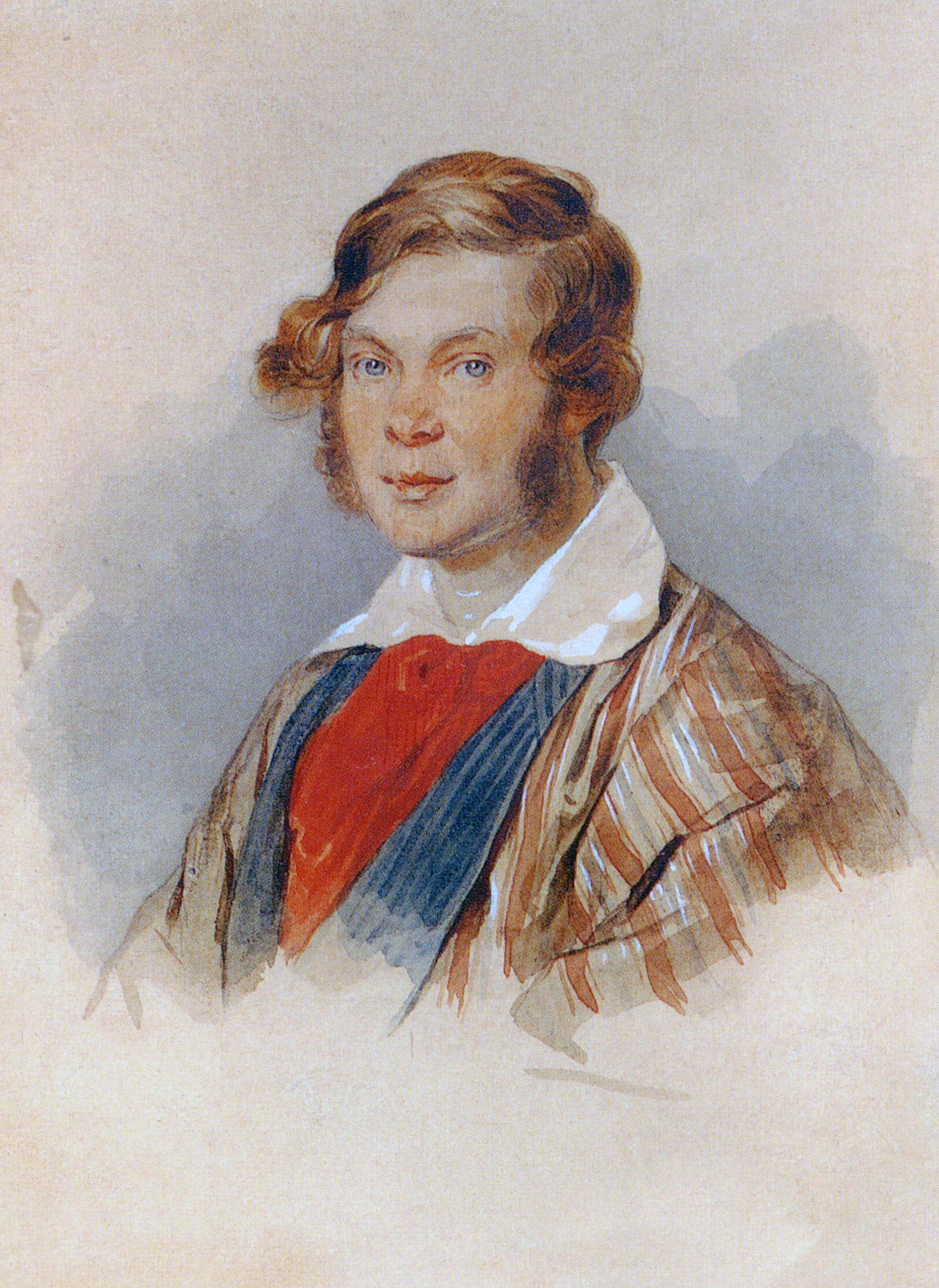
Pyotr Vyazemsky

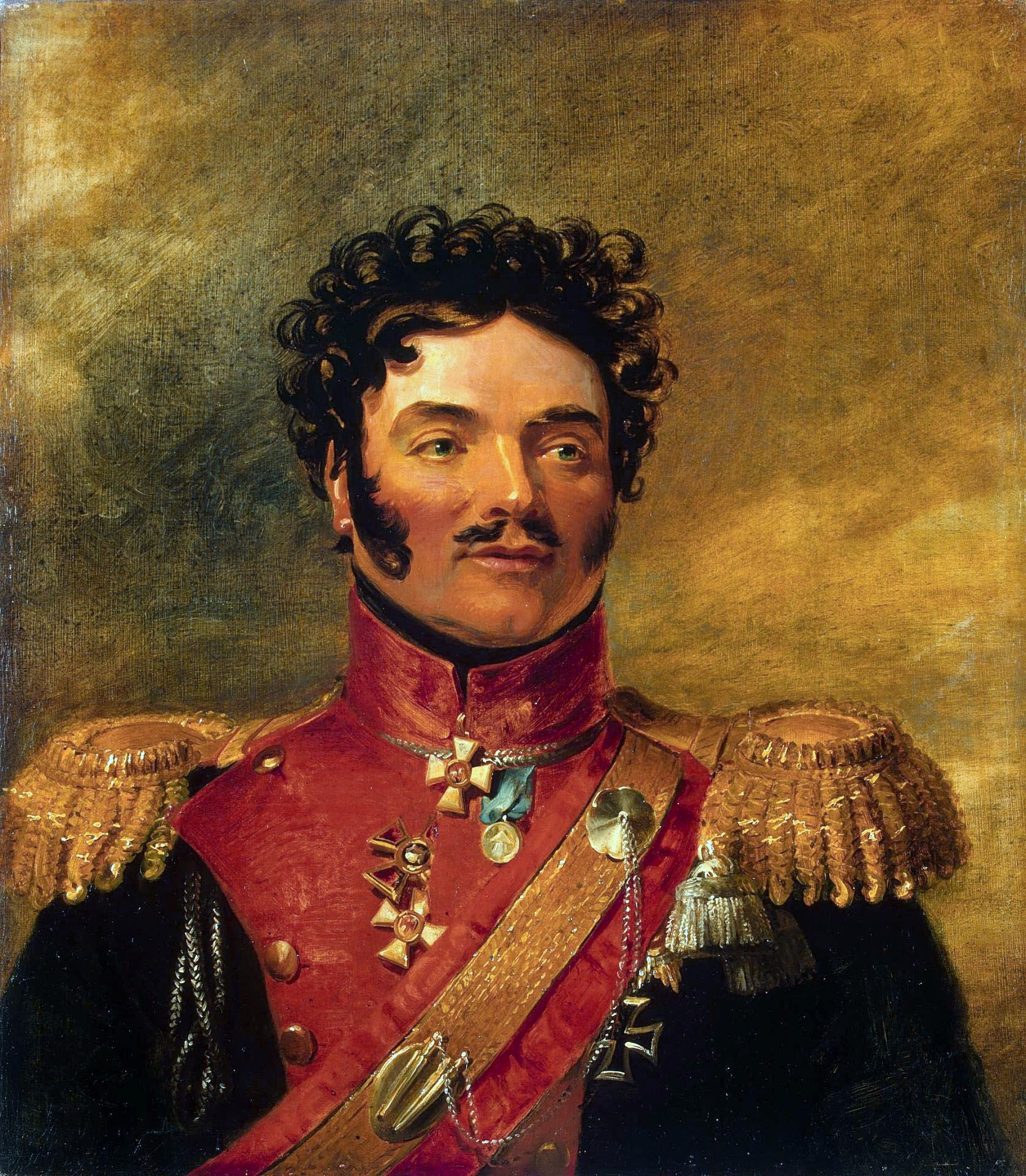
Portrait of Joseph Cornelius O'Rourke by George Dawe in the Military Gallery of the Winter Palace.

- Prince Pyotr Andreyevich Vyazemsky (1792–1878) was a leading personality of the Golden Age of Russian poetry. His parents were a Russian prince of Rurikid stock, Prince Andrey Vyazemsky (1754–1807), and an Irish lady, Jenny Quinn O'Reilly (1762–1802), in baptism Evgenia Ivanovna Vyazemskaya. As a young man, he took part in the Battle of Borodino and other engagements of the Napoleonic Wars. Many years later, Tolstoy's description of the battle in War and Peace appeared inaccurate to him and he engaged in a literary feud with him.
- Count Johann Georg von Browne (1767–1827) was an officer in the Russian army, and settled in Vienna where he was a patron of Ludwig van Beethoven during the composer's early career.
- Yuri Yurievich Browne, Count von Browne in the nobility of the Holy Roman Empire (1698–1792), was an Irish soldier of fortune who became a full general in the Russian military. Browne was descended from a family which could trace its descent to the time of the Conqueror, and had settled in Ireland at a very early period. His immediate ancestors were the Brownes of Camas, Limerick, where he was born 15 June 1698. He was educated at Limerick diocesan school.
- Count Ioseph Kornilovich O'Rourke (1772–1849) was a Russian nobleman. He was a military leader who fought in the Napoleonic Wars and achieved the rank of lieutenant general; he is noted in present-day Serbia, where he led a combined Russian and Serb army to defeat the Turks at Varvarin in 1810.
- Pyotr Petrovich Lassi, Generalfeldmarschall of Russian Imperial Army.
- Alexander Arturovich Rou (also, Rowe, from his Irish father's name) (1906–1973) was a Soviet film director, and People's Artist of the RSFSR (1968). He worked primarily in the fairy-tale genre.

== See also ==
- Ireland–Russia relations
- Irish people in mainland Europe
- Russians in the United Kingdom
- Scottish Russians
