= Mikhail Khomutov =

General Michael Grigorievich Khomutov
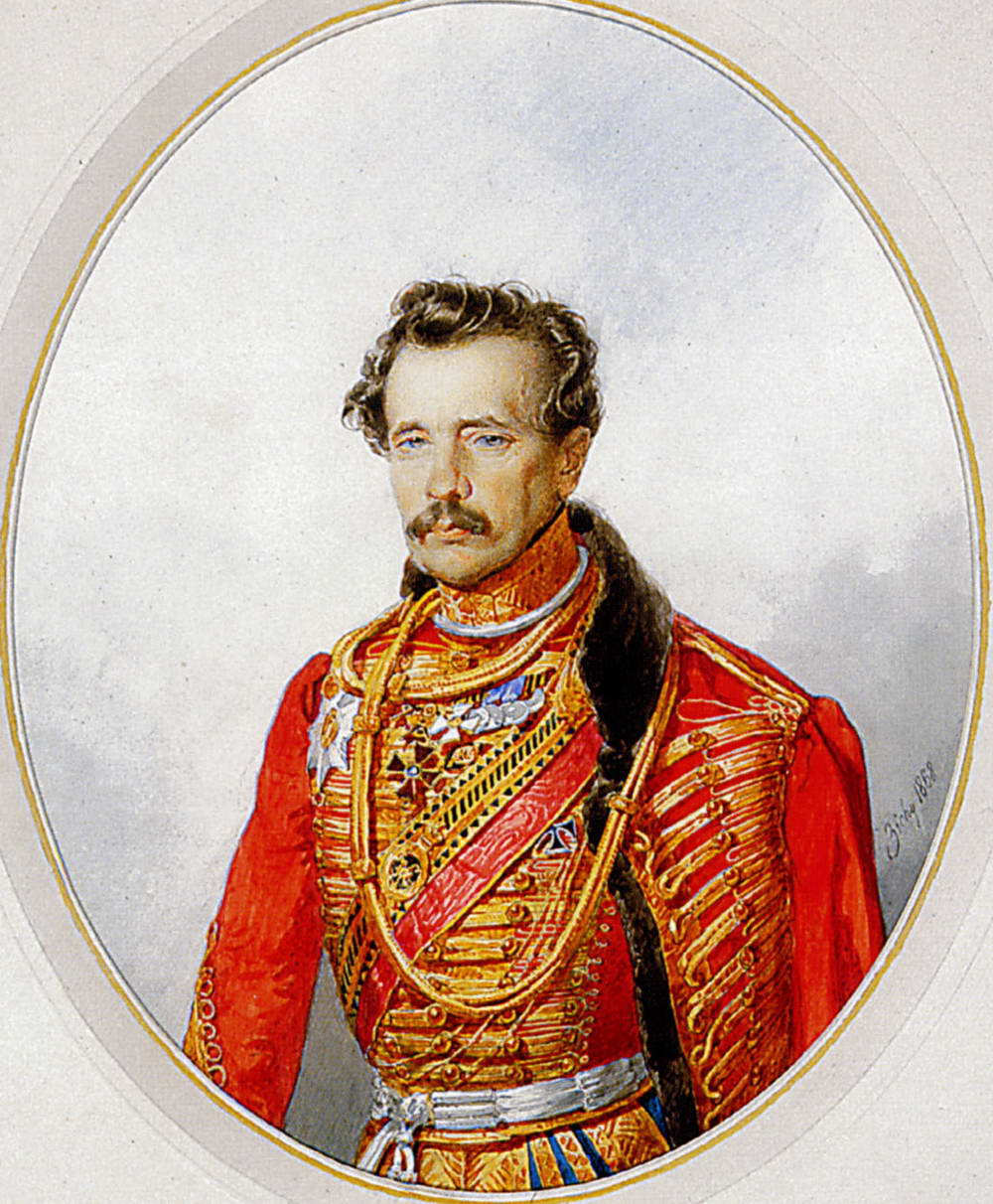
- Portrait by Mihály Zichy, 1868
- Born: 1795
- Died: 1864 (aged 68–69)
- Relatives: Khomutov family (Tula)
- Military career
- Allegiance: Russia
- Branch: Imperial Russian Army
- Service years: 1844–1864
- Rank: General of the cavalry
- Commands: Acting ataman of the Don Cossacks
- Conflicts: Napoleonic Wars; War of the Sixth Coalition; Fifth Russo-Turkish War
- Awards: Gold Sword for Bravery

Michael Grigorievich Khomutov (Russian: Михаи́л Григо́рьевич Хомуто́в; 1795—1864) was a Russian general of the cavalry and adjutant general. He was also the acting ataman of the Don Cossacks from 1848 to 1862.

== Sources ==
- "Хомутов, Михаил Григорьевич" . Brockhaus and Efron Encyclopedic Dictionary (in Russian). 1906.
