= Gamontov (Russian nobility) =

- Parent house: Clan Hamilton
- Country: Russian Empire

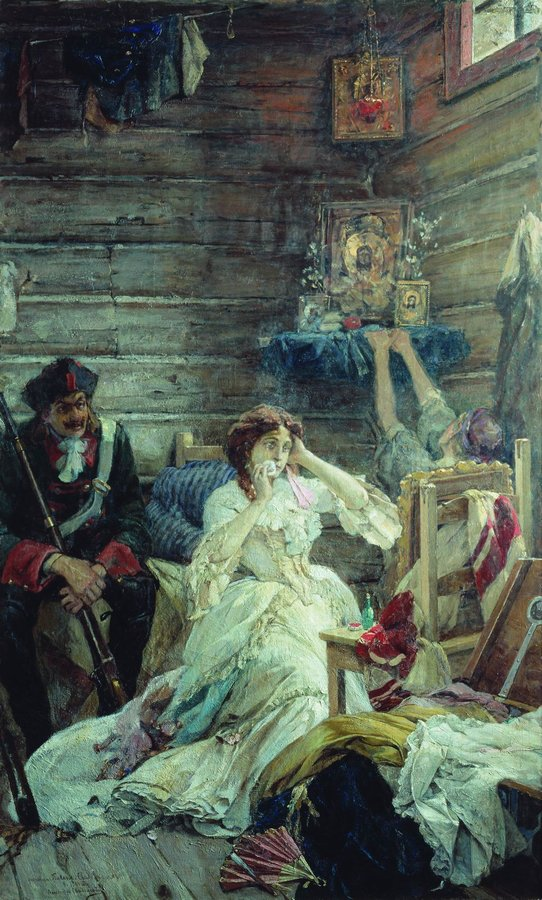
Mary Hamilton Before Execution, St. Petersburg by Pavel Svedomskiy, 1904

The Gamoltov family (Russian: Гамолтовы) is the name of Russian noble family of Scottish origin, descend from Petr Gamoltov-Hamilton, an officer in Russian service since 1610. He had several granddaughters. The first, Eudoxia, was an aunt of Natalya Kirillovna Naryshkina the Tsaritsa of Russia from 1671 to 1676 as the second spouse of Tsar Alexei I of Russia, and regent of Russia as the mother of Tsar Peter the Great in 1682. The second was a wife of Artamon Matveyev.

== Descendants ==
- The most famous is Maria Hamilton or Maria Danilovna Gamentova (died 14 March 1719). She was the lady-in-waiting of Empress Catherine I of Russia and a royal mistress of Tsar Peter the Great. She was executed for abortion, infanticide, theft and slander of Empress Catherine. She is cited as one of the possible inspirations for the ballad "Mary Hamilton".
- Count Andrey Artamonovich Matveev (Russian: Андрей Артамонович Матвеев) (1666–1728), son of Artamon Matveyev and his wife Eudoxia Gamoltova, he was a Russian statesman of the Petrine epoch best remembered as one of the first Russian ambassadors and Peter the Great's agent in London and The Hague.
