= De Balmen (Russian nobility) =

- Parent house: Clan Ramsay
- Country: Kingdom of England, Kingdom of France, Russian Empire
- Titles: Counts of Russian Empire since 1845
- Estate: Lynovytsia

The De Balmen family (Russian: Де Бальмен) is the name of a noble family of Scottish origin. The family members bear the title of Count. The family estate was located at Lynovytsia, in present-day Ukraine.

== Notable members ==
- Count Anton Bogdanovich de Balmen (Russian: Антон Богданович де Бальмен) was a Russian Empire general of Scottish origin, Governor-General of Kursk and Oryol, commander of the Russian Caucasian corps.
- Count Jakov Petrovich de Balmen (Russian: Яков Петрович де Бальмен; 16 June 1813 – 14 July 1845) was a Russian Army cavalry officer, adjutant of general Alexander von Lüders and painter, student of Karl Rabus. After early graduation he was commissioned as an adjutant in the Belgorod Lancers and after that moved to the 12th Akhtyrsky Hussar regiment, serving in Austria, Hungary and on the Polish frontier, where he again became known for his horsemanship and was promoted to senior lieutenant. Jakov de Balmen was killed at the Battle of Dargo in 1845. Ukrainian romantic poet Taras Shevchenko decided his poet The Caucasus to his friend while condemning the Russian imperialism he was serving at the time of his death.
