= Dairsie Old Church =

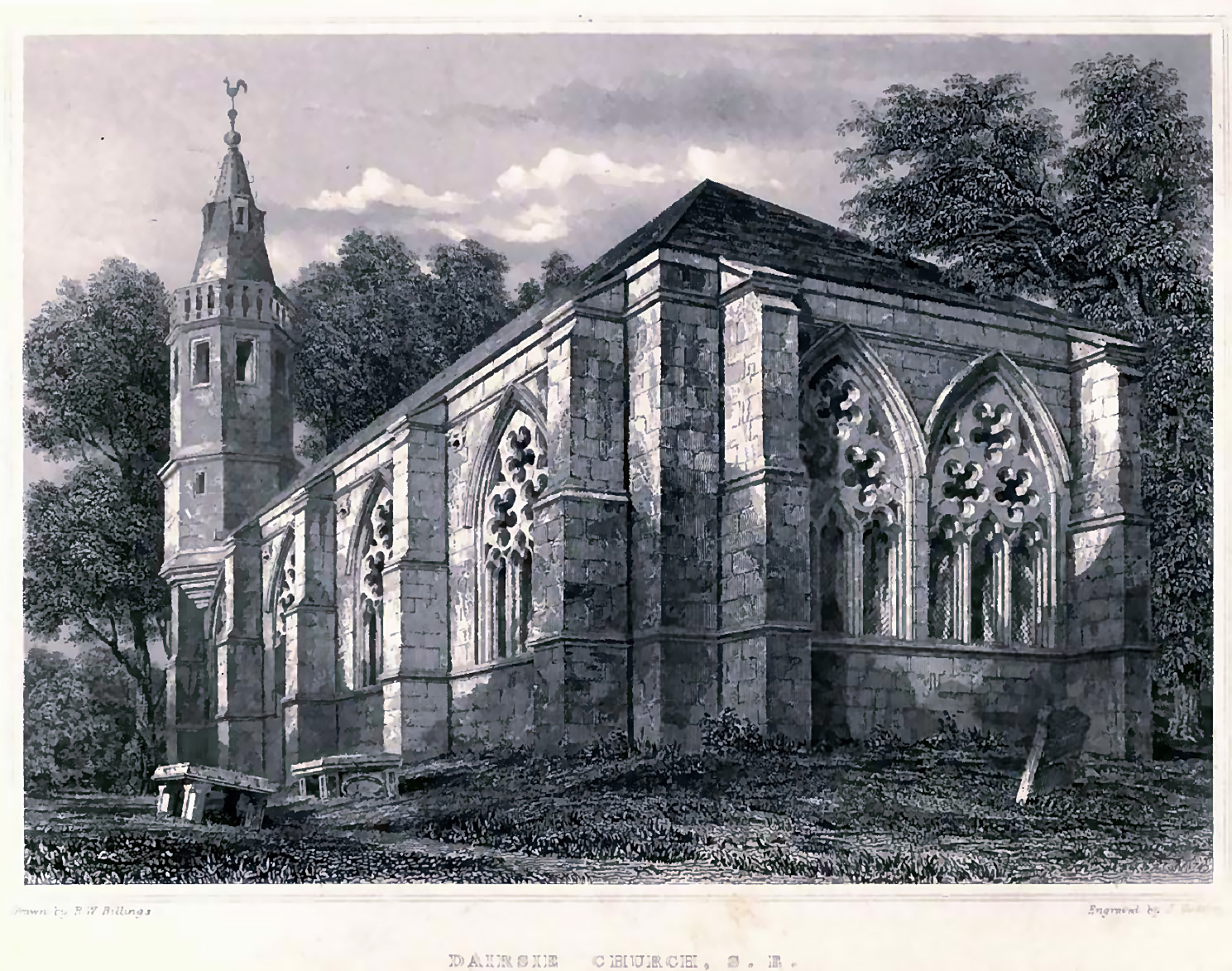
- Dairsie Church in the late 19th century, engraved by R W Billings

- Location of Dairsie Old Church in Fife
- 56°20′0″N 2°56′58″W
- Location: Dairsie, Fife, Scotland; GB grid reference NO413161

History
- Built: 1621
- Built for: John Spottiswoode

Listed Building – Category A
- Official name: Dairsie Old Church (St Mary's)
- Designated: 1 March 1984
- Reference no.: LB2610

Dairsie Old Church, formerly St Mary's Church, is the former parish church of Dairsie, in north-east Fife, Scotland. It is located around 1.2 kilometres (0.75 mi) south of Dairsie village. The present church was built in 1621, and is an unusual example of post-Reformation Gothic architecture in Scotland. It is no longer in use as a church, and is protected as a Category A listed building.

== History ==
A church at Dairsie is recorded in 1183. In 1300 the church was granted to the Convent of St Andrews; it may have been rebuilt at this time.

In 1621, the present church was built by John Spottiswoode (1565–1639), Archbishop of St Andrews, who had recently bought the adjacent Dairsie Castle. The Spottiswoode family crest, with John Spottiswoode's initials, is carved over the west door.

In the late 18th century the original flat roof was replaced with the present piend (hipped) roof. A major refit was carried out in 1835–1837, including works to the interior, although most of this has since been removed.

Ecclesiastical use of the church ceased in 1966, the congregation now using the former Free Church in Dairsie village.
