= John Spottiswoode =

Scottish archbishop (1565–1639)

The Most Reverend John Spottiswoode
- Archbishop of St Andrews
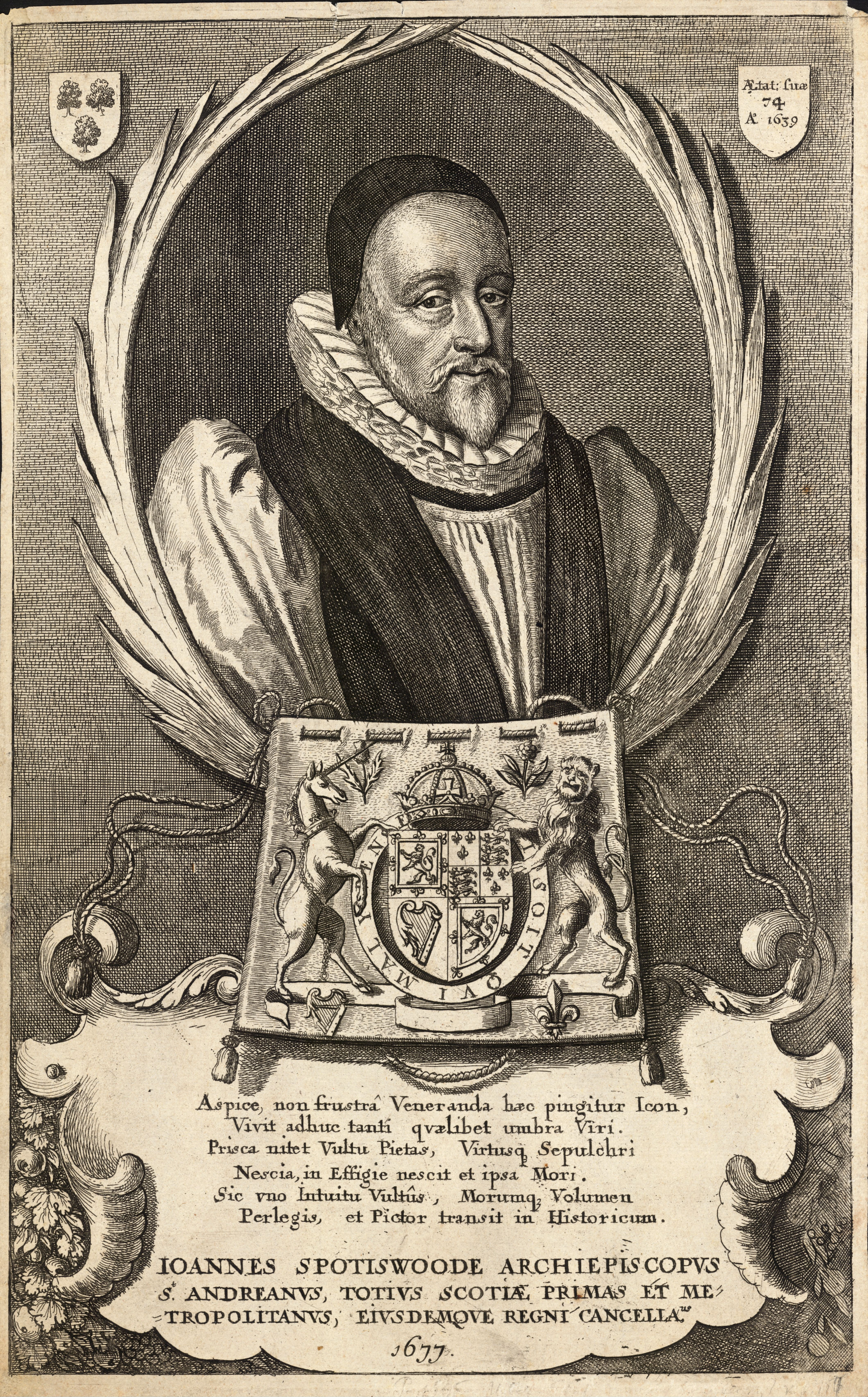
- Church: Church of Scotland
- In office: 1615–1639
- Predecessor: George Gledstanes
- Successor: James Sharp

Orders
- Consecration: 21 October 1610 by George Abbot

Personal details
- Born: 1565 Mid Calder, West Lothian, Scotland
- Died: 26 November 1639 (aged 74) London, England
- Parents: John Spottiswood; Beatrix Crichton
- Spouse: Rachel Lindsay
- Children: Anne Spottiswoode; Sir John Spottiswoode of Dairsie; Sir Robert Spottiswood

John Spottiswoode (Spottiswood, Spotiswood, Spotiswoode or Spotswood) (1565 – 26 November 1639) was an Archbishop of St Andrews, Primate of All Scotland, Lord Chancellor, and historian of Scotland.

== Life ==
He was born in 1565 at Greenbank in Mid Calder, West Lothian, Scotland, the eldest son of John Spottiswood, minister of Calder and superintendent of Lothian, and wife Beatrix Crichton. He was educated at the University of Glasgow (MA 1581), and succeeded his father in the parish of Calder in 1583. In 1601 he attended Ludowick, Duke of Lennox, as his chaplain, in an embassy to the court of France, returning in 1603. He followed James VI and I to England on his accession at the Union of the Crowns. He was sent back to Scotland to attend Anne of Denmark as her almoner or "elemosynar", receiving a yearly stipend of £80. In the same year he was nominated to the Archbishop of Glasgow, his consecration in London, however, not taking place until October 1610.

Spottiswoode had originally become prominent as an ardent supporter of the strict Presbyterian party, but gradually came to see the inconveniences of "parity of ministers", attributed little importance to the existing matters of dispute, and thought that the interests of both church and state were best secured by keeping on good terms with the king. He was therefore ready to co-operate with James in curtailing the powers of the Kirk which encroached on the royal authority, and in assimilating the Church of Scotland to that of England. On 30 May 1605 he became a member of the Scottish Privy Council. In 1608 he worked closely with George Home, Earl of Dunbar in appointing suitable ministers to vacant parishes in the Borders as part of James' programme for bringing peace to the region. In 1610 he presided as moderator over the assembly in which the supremacy of presbytery was abolished. That same year he was consecrated bishop on 21 October by the bishops of London, Ely, Rochester, and Worcester. In 1614, he was instrumental in the arrest and subsequent trial and condemnation to death of John Ogilvie. In 1615 he was made Archbishop of St Andrews and primate of Scotland, and in 1618 procured the sanction of the privy council to the Five Articles of Perth with their ratification by parliament in 1621.

In 1633 he crowned Charles I at Holyrood. In 1635 he was appointed Lord Chancellor of Scotland, an office which he retained until 1638. John founded Dairsie Old Church, and re-built Dairsie Castle as a family home. The castle was rebuilt from a ruin in the 1990s, and his family crest is visible inside and outside the buildings.

He was opposed to the new liturgy as inexpedient, but when he could not prevent its introduction he took part in enforcing it. He was a spectator of the riot of St Giles, Edinburgh, on 23 July 1637, endeavoured in vain to avoid disaster by concessions, and on the taking of the Covenant perceived that "now all that we have been doing these thirty years past is thrown down at once." He escaped to Newcastle, was deposed by the assembly on 4 December on a variety of ridiculous charges, and died in London on 26 November 1639, receiving burial in Westminster Abbey on 2 December 1639.

Spottiswoode published in 1620 Refutatio libelli de regimine ecclesiae scoticanae, an answer to a tract of David Calderwood, who replied in the Vindiciae subjoined to his Altare damascenum (1623). The only other writing published during his lifetime was the sermon he preached at the Perth assembly. His most considerable work was The History of the Church and State of Scotland (London, 1655, seq.). It displays considerable research and sagacity, and even when dealing with contemporary events gives a favorable impression, upon the whole, of the author's candour and truth. The opposite side can be studied in Calderwood's History of the Kirk of Scotland.

== Criticism ==
The Secession historian Thomas M'Crie was very critical of Spottiswoode. He said,

"Gladstanes was succeeded in the primacy by John Spotswoode, a shrewd and crafty politician, and the author of a History of the Church of Scotland, which, as has been well observed, might more properly be called "Calumnies against the Church of Scotland." This historian, as appears from his private correspondence, was engaged in all the Jesuitical plots of the government for overturning Presbytery, which he had sworn to support, and could hardly be expected to give a fair account of transactions in which his own credit was so deeply implicated, and for his share in which he was afterwards excommunicated by the Church which he had betrayed. His falsehoods and misrepresentations have been so completely exposed, that to appeal to him now as an authority on any point of history affecting the cause of Presbytery, may be set down at once as a mark of blindfolded prejudice."

== Family ==
Spottiswoode married Rachel Lindsay, daughter of David Lindsay, Bishop of Ross, and first wife Joneta Ramsay, with issue a daughter and two sons:

- Anne Spottiswoode
- Sir John Spottiswoode of Dairsie in Fife. He was appointed one of the Gentlemen of the Bedchamber to Charles I of England when a young man, and was knighted by the King as appears by a charter under the great seal, dated 5 June 1621. He died before the restoration of King Charles II. His only son was:
  - John Spottiswoode, a staunch loyalist, who joined James Graham, 1st Marquess of Montrose and was taken prisoner with him and executed immediately after him, on 21 May 1650.
- Sir Robert Spottiswood, Lord President of the Court of Session (1596–1646), who was captured at the battle of Philiphaugh in 1645 and executed on 20 January 1646.

== Sources ==
- the accounts prefixed to the first edition of Spottiswoode's History of Scotland
- the accounts published by the Spottiswoode Society in 1851
- David Calderwood's History of the Kirk of Scotland (1842–1849).

== See also ==
- Alexander Spotswood - the noted Lieutenant-Governor of Virginia, who was grandson of Robert Spottiswoode (1596–1646) and great-grandson of Archbishop John Spottiswoode.

Political offices
Preceded by 1st Earl of Kinnoull	Lord Chancellor of Scotland; 1635–1638	Succeeded by 1st Duke of Hamilton
Religious titles
Preceded by George Gledstanes	Archbishop of St Andrews; 1615–1639	Succeeded by James Sharp
Academic offices
Preceded by George Gledstanes; Archbishop of St Andrews	Chancellor of the University of St Andrews; 1615–1639	Succeeded by 1st Earl of Loudoun
