= Artamonova, Perm Krai =

Artamonova Артамонова
- Village
- Location within Perm Krai Location within Russia
- Coordinates: 58°57′N 54°42′E
- Country: Russia
- Region: Perm Krai
- District: Kudymkarsky District
- Time zone: UTC+5:00

Artamonova (Russian: Артамонова) is a rural locality (a village) in Stepanovskoye Rural Settlement, Kudymkarsky District, Perm Krai, Russia. The population was 181 as of 2010. There are five streets.

== Geography ==
Artamonova is located 8 km south of Kudymkar (the district's administrative centre) by road. Tarova is the nearest rural locality.
