= Jacob Shaw's Regiment =

- Active: ≈1613–1629
- Disbanded: 1630
- Allegiance: (Poland) Polish–Lithuanian Commonwealth; Tsardom of Russia
- Type: Infantry
- Role: Line infantry
- Size: 150-200
- Garrison/HQ: Tula, Moscow
- Nickname: Bel’skie nemtsy/Бельские немцы
- Engagements: Polish–Muscovite War (1605–18), Russo-Crimean Wars

Commanders
- Current commander: Captain William Grim
- Ceremonial chief: Captain-Rittmeister Jacob Shaw

Jacob Shaw's Regiment (Russian: Бельские немцы Яковлевы роты Ша) was a Russian regular infantry regiment of the Russian Army. The regiments of the new order, or regiments of the foreign order ("Полки нового строя" or "Полки иноземного строя", Polki novovo (inozemnovo) stroya), was the Russian term that was used to describe military units that were formed in the Tsardom of Russia and Russian Empire in the 17th century according to the Western European military standards composed of Mercenary officers and soldiers of Russian origin. Some number of soldiers and officers from Jacob Shaw's Regiment later participated in the New Russian Army reform that was done in cooperation with general Alexander Leslie with Boyar Boris Morozov.

== History ==
=== Formation ===
During the Polish–Russian War of 1609–1618, a Regiment under the command of William Grim, later under Captain-Rittmeister Jacob Shaw, (both Scots) was in the service of the Polish–Lithuanian Commonwealth. In August 1613, a Russian army commanded by Voevoda Dmitrii M. Cherkasskii laid siege to the Bely fortress. After putting up a stout defence for almost a month, the garrison switched sides, surrendered the fortress and took service with Russia's military force. Voevoda Cherkasski was impressed by the garrison's skill and determination, and he reported that to Moscow. The Bel'skie nemtsy, as the Russians called them, consisted of excellent, well-ordered soldiers with highly competent officers, it was raised in Scotland and another company was raised in Ireland

=== Campaigns ===
In 1618, at least eighteen former members of the Belaia garrison served in military forces defending Moscow against a Polish army that contained many Irish and Scottish troops. Several of the Belskiye nemtsy were killed or wounded while defending the capital. At least six of them, including George Learmonth, played a decisive role in turning back Prince Wladyslaw's troops during intense fighting at Moscow's Arbat Gates in Bely Gorod. In that battle, Learmonth's bravery was on display "for all to see". When Lieutenant David Edwards was killed in the defence of Moscow, the Irish soldiers in his company immediately petitioned to have George Learmonth replace him. He was promoted to the rank of lieutenant and received fifteen rubles per month.

The regiment participated in several of the Russo-Crimean Wars against the Crimean–Nogai raids. From 1626, all foreign mercenaries were known under Russian names, and after converting to Orthodox Christianity, they always received certain material benefits, typically lands with serfs or rubles and clothes.

After 1629, it was quickly disbanded, with some soldiers moving to Sweden and others continuing their service under the command of Alexander Leslie of Auchintoul, later Patrick Gordon of Auchleuchries. Some of them first joined the Muscovite Reiter regiment of Charles d'Ebert.

== 1st Platoon ==
- Captain William Grim/Вилим Грим
- Captain-Rittmeister Jacob-James Shaw/Яков Ша
  - Captain Andrew (Henry, Alexander?) Mowbray/Ондрей Мутр
  - Poruchik John Wood/Ян Иванов сын, Вуд, landlord in Nizhny Novgorod
  - Praporshchik William Durie/Вилим Дюри
  - Praporshchik David Andrews/Давыд Адворец
  - Praporshchik Peter Yuille/Пётр Юль (killed in action)
  - Ensign George-Yuri Leirmont/Юрья Лермант
    - Scribe John Fermor/Ян Фарфар
    - Drummer Frank Sewell/Франциск Сеуль (wounded).
    - Doctor/Орн Бартень
    - Andrew Anston/Андрей Ангстон, nobleman
    - William Aston/Вилим Иванов сын, Анстон (Янстун), nobleman
    - Arthur Armon/Артур Армон, nobleman
    - James Auchterlony (Ouchterlony)/Якуб Охторлони, nobleman
    - David Buist or Bruce/Давид Бюст, nobleman
    - Andrew Henry Wood/Ондрей-Давид Вуд (Вод), nobleman, landlord in Galich
    - Alexander Gordon/Александер Гордон
    - William Car/Вилим Кар, nobleman
    - Robert Kingan/Роборт Кинган, nobleman
    - John Crichton/Ян Крихтон, nobleman
    - Robert Cunningham/Робарт Кумнигем, nobleman, landlord in Nizhny Novgorod
    - John Laundie/Ян Лунды Романов, nobleman (Note: Due to Vasili Storozhev, Laudie was in Irish Platoon)
    - Peter Monteith/Петр Мантет, nobleman
    - Andrew Moutray/Андрей Марлы, nobleman
    - Gilbert Mellick/Гиберт Мелех (Меллер), nobleman
    - John Mowbrey/Ян Мубр, nobleman
    - William Paul/Вилим Паул, nobleman
    - Edward Paull/Едварт Андреев сын, Пауль (Note: Due to Vasili Storozhev, Laudie was in Irish Platoon)
    - Robert Stenson/Роборт Стинсон, nobleman (wounded)
    - James Steele/Якуб Стыль, nobleman
    - James Scott/Якуб Шкот, nobleman
    - James Adamson/Якуб-Ульян Адамсон, Васильев, nobleman
      - Adam Aikman/Адам Акмон, private
      - William Arthur/Вилим Артор, private
      - /Юрий Бах, private
      - /Анц Брандоборк, private
      - David Brown/Давыд Иванов сын, Брун, private
      - /Михайло Венглин, private
      - John Williamson/Анц Вилимсон, private
      - James Drew/Якуб Дреф, private
      - John Antzplatov/Иван Анцплатов-Кобылин, landlord in Rostov
      - Arthur Antz/Антур-Юрий Анц
      - James Duff/Якуб Дуф
      - John Forbes/Ян(Якуб) Томасов сын, Фарбус
      - William Harvie/Вилим Гарви-Ганри
      - William Horne/Вилим Гарвин (with wife in Tula)
      - John Gents/Ян Ген
      - Peter (Patrick) Gordon/Петр Гордон
      - John Gurthrie/Ян Горты, сын Адамов
      - John Inglis/Ян Ингле(н)т
      - David Laundie/Давыд Лунды
      - /Ян Лян
      - /Ян Мудр
      - /Симан Клеиншмет
      - Thomas Clelland/Томас (orthodox name Анофрий) Клилянт (wounded near Mozhaysk)
      - William Clelland/Вилим (orthodox name Петр) Клилянт, landlord in Vologda, since 1627 in Nizhny Novgorod
      - George Peebles/Юрья Пиблит
      - Thomas Philips/Тумас Филипов
      - /Александр Рар
      - David Ruthven/Давыд Ровен (wounded)
      - William Ruthven/Вилим Ровен-Радван (killed in action)
      - William Shearer/Вилим Иванов сын, Шеир
      - Allan Sympson/Алону Сымсон
      - James Steele/Якуб Стиль
      - William Steward/Вилим Стуарт
      - /Анц Суцвент (Суцвелт)
      - /Давыд Сухвалт
      - Gabriel Yetts/Гаврил Яц

== 2nd Platoon ==
- Captain Thomas Wyeast/Томас Юстос
- Poruchik Neil O’Donald/Нил Одонол-Одонил
  - Praporshchik Brian O’Donald/Брин Одонол
  - Praporshchik Ian Bain/Ян-Осип Бан
  - Ensign /Атеган (Отеган) Мартин, nobleman
  - Scribe /Адрей Баба писарь
  - Drummer /Балах Тарлах
  - Drummer /Михелт
  - Drummer /Ян Романов сын Терел-Терех
    - /Ардор Иванов сын, Аганлон, nobleman
    - /Якуб Акалан, nobleman
    - /Бреян Акан (Окаян), nobleman, landlord in Vologda
    - /Ардон Андох, nobleman
    - /Донолт Аферон, nobleman
    - Gabriel Bredon/Гаврила Юрьев сын Бреден (Бред)
    - Ian Broom/Ян Брун, nobleman, landowner at Alatyr
    - /Он Яковлев сын, Грум, nobleman
    - Ian Duffy/Ян Дуф, nobleman
    - /Томас Ирис, nobleman
    - /Варнава Килеварт, nobleman
    - /Рыцерт Кумен, nobleman
    - Thomas MacCurtain/Тумас Макартол, nobleman
    - /Ян Макаф, nobleman
    - Peter MacNailly/Петр-Павел Макноли, nobleman
    - Donoaghie Macnamari/Данах Макнамори (Мангармов), nobleman
    - Ian MacToole/Ян Мактуль, nobleman
    - /Кал Рели, nobleman
    - Ian Row/Ян Ро, nobleman
    - /Юрий Фишгарец, nobleman
      - Alexander Ardson/Александр cын Иванов, Ард(ов), private
      - John Arnott/Ян cын Борисов, Арн(от), private
      - /Брин Артан, private
      - /Бриен Асирдон, private
      - /Ян Ахи, private
      - /David Bell/Давыд Бели, private
      - Michael Bourke/Михель Бурк
      - /Вилим Врим, private
      - /Томас Вяст(Васт), private
      - Richard Cax-Cox/Кирилл-Роман Куй, Кондратьев
      - Alexander Gar/Александр Гарь
      - /Ян Гети, private
      - /Арт Донахи, private
      - /Ляхлин Доск, private
      - /Ян Дюри ирл, private
      - /Михаил Камен, private
      - William Carroll/Вилим Карил, private
      - Ian Cook/Ян Кук, private
      - /Рицерт Линс, private
      - Art MacMahon/Арт Макмагони, private
      - Conagher MacKeen/Конохор Макине, private
      - /Торлах Магдермонт (Магин), private
      - Arthur MacGinn/Арт-Ермоген Магин
      - James MacAllen/Якуб Маканал
      - Donoaghie MacKinley/Данах Макноли-Макнали
      - Conagher MacKeen/Конохор Макине
      - Michail Kriush/Михаль(orthodox name Maxim) Михайлов Круг (Note: Due to Vasili Storozhev, Kriush was in Scottish Platoon)
      - Art MacKeen/Арт Магин, landlord in Vologda
      - Thomas MacCurtain/Василий-Корнила, Мартынов
      - Donoaghie O'Cahane/Донах Окаян-Окоян
      - Ian O'Collins/Ян Околон (Orlov/Орлов)
      - /Доноль Маклукаш, private
      - /Донолт Моклан, private
      - Ian O'Kelly/Ян Окели, private
      - Arthur O'Hanlon/Рури Одонол, private
      - /Обонак Роборт, private
      - /Обрин Калах, private
      - /Околон Ян, private
      - Niall O’Mara/Нел Омори-Мори, private
      - /Смет Ян, private
      - Brian O’Sirdan/, private
      - /Рицерт Ускисен (Федор Устриков), private
      - Jarlath Scrope/Скруп Джан, private
      - Ian Parekh/Ян Парах, private
      - George Peebles/Юрий Пиблиз, private
      - Alexander Ward/, private
      - Andrew Wood/Андрей Вуд, private

- Scottish captain-Rittmeister Antz Op/Анц Оп and Irish Captain Siman Biy/Симан Бий

== Assimilation in Russia ==
In late 1610, many former members of the Swedish-Russian army participated in the Polish capture of the Russian border town of Belaia and newly served Belaia garrison composed of approximately 150 soldiers organized in two cavalry companies, one Scottish and one Irish. Those companies served side by side for three years while maintaining their separate identities and strong unit cohesion. Some of the men married local women and started families. After 1616 part of them had been sent to Tula, a major southern military headquarters, where they helped defend Russia's vulnerable steppe frontier against Tatar raids.

While living in the Tula region several officers of the former Belaia garrison, including George-Yuri Leirmont, petitioned Tsar Mikhail for an increase in status and salary. They requested transfer into the ranks of the Russian gentry militia called "pomeshchiks". That would qualify each of them to receive several hundred acres of land with serfs. In their petition, the men stated: "We your slaves do not wish to go to our own land, because we have married here and have children, and we want to spill our blood for Thee the Sovereign." After a review of their condition, the Russians dismissed twenty one of them as unfit for further duty due to old age or infirmities; those men were honourably settled near Tula at half pay. About a dozen Scottish and Irish soldiers successfully petitioned the tsar to allow them to return home.

== See also ==
- Thirty Years' War
- Scottish Russians
