= Artamonov (Russian nobility) =

Russian noble family

Artamonov family Артамоновы
- Russian noble family
- Country: Russian Empire
- Founded: 17th century
- Founder: Art McKeen

The Artamonov family (Russian: Артамоновы, the Artamonovs) is a Russian noble family of Scottish origin, descended from Art MacKeen (Russian: Арт Магин), a mercenary that was recruited to the regiment under the command of William Grim ( later under Captain-Rittmeister Jacob Shaw). He first entered service to the Polish-Lithuanian Commonwealth, but during the siege of the fortress of Bely in 1614, his regiment switched sides, surrendered the fortress and allied to Russia. Later on, the regiment participated in several Russo-Crimean Wars during the period of Crimean–Nogai raids. Ivan, son of Denis Artmanov, was mentioned as a pomeschik in Vologda.

== See also ==
- Artamonov, list of people with the surname
