= Treaty of Greenwich =

1543 treaty between England and Scotland

The Treaty of Greenwich (also known as the Treaties of Greenwich) contained two agreements both signed on 1 July 1543 in Greenwich between representatives of England and Scotland. The accord, overall, entailed a plan developed by Henry VIII of England to unite both kingdoms (i.e. Union of the Crowns). The first sub-treaty helped to establish peace between the Kingdom of England and the Kingdom of Scotland. The second sub-treaty was a marriage proposal between Edward, Prince of Wales and Mary, Queen of Scots. In this part of the treaty, it was agreed that Mary would be accompanied by an English nobleman/gentleman (and his wife) until she was ten years old. Afterwards, Mary would reside in England until the time of her marriage. Also, the Treaty of Greenwich permitted the Kingdom of Scotland to maintain its laws. Even though the Earl of Arran signed the accord on 1 July and ratified it on 25 August 1543, the Treaty of Greenwich was ultimately rejected by the Parliament of Scotland on 11 December 1543, leading to eight years of Anglo-Scottish conflict known as the Rough Wooing.

== Diplomacy ==
The treaty was the culmination of diplomatic efforts by Adam Otterburn, George Douglas of Pittendreich and Earl of Glencairn in London, and Ralph Sadler in Edinburgh. The commissioners for Mary (with the consent of Regent Arran) were Glencairn, Pittendreich, William Hamilton, James Learmonth of Dairsie and Henry Balnaves. Henry's commissioners were Baron Audley of Walden, Thomas Howard, 3rd Duke of Norfolk, Stephen Gardiner Bishop of Winchester, Thomas Thirlby Bishop of Westminster, and the Barons St John and Gage.

A significant part of the negotiation was the understanding, on the part of Regent Arran, Governor of Scotland, that his son James Hamilton would marry Elizabeth, the daughter of Henry VIII and Anne Boleyn.

== Articles signed at Greenwich Palace ==
Two Anglo-Scottish treaties were signed at Greenwich Palace on 1 July 1543. The first treaty was a general peace treaty in traditional terms. The articles agreed were;

1. Peace during the life of either Henry VIII or Mary, Queen of Scots and for one year after.
2. That neither monarch shall make war upon the other or his confederates, or do anything to the hurt of the other.
3. If anyone, spiritual or temporal, even though pretending supreme authority, allied or connected with either Prince, shall do or procure any hurt to any territory of the other, the Prince shall not give, or permit his subjects to give, any aid thereto, notwithstanding any former contracts.
4. That neither monarch, upon pretext of any ecclesiastical sentence or censure, shall violate any article of this treaty; and that either party shall, within three months of this date, before notaries and in presence of ambassadors, publicly and in writing renounce all privileges, dispensations etc., which might impede the effect of this treaty.
5. Neither monarch shall receive the other's rebels or traitors, but deliver them up within 20 days, upon letters of requisition
6. Nor homicides, robbers, and other fugitives, who shall be delivered within ten days.
7. Neither monarch to give safe-conducts to subjects of the other except upon the latter's written request.
8. Punishment of homicides, robbers etc., on the Marches according to the laws of the Marches.
9. Ships, sailors and merchants to be well treated as in former times of peace, and specially in accordance with the treaty between Edward IV and James III dated 1 June 1464.
10. Right of subjects whose goods are spoiled and carried across the March to follow in pursuit of them.
11. No dweller in either March or in the Debatable Ground to take timber out of the other March without obtaining leave.
12. The castle and town of Berwick upon Tweed with its ancient limits shall remain at peace.
13. The repairing or breaking of the fish garth of Esk shall not be held an attemptate against this treaty.
14. Fugitives of Scotland who have become lieges of the King of England to be treated as Englishmen, and similarly Englishmen, if any, who may have become lieges of the Queen of Scots as Scots.
15. Any subject of either monarch who, being despoiled by a subject of the other, shall of himself make reprisals, shall thereby forfeit his cause.
16. The island of Lundy in England and the lordship of Lorne in Scotland are not comprised in this peace.
17. Attacks upon Lundy and Lorne shall not be considered ruptures of this peace.
18. In this treaty are comprehended, for England the Emperor Charles, the king of the Romans and the Hanse and Teutonic companies, and for Scotland the Emperor Charles, the French king, the king of the Romans, the king of Denmark, the dukes of Gueldres and Holstein, the margrave of Brandenburg and the Company of the Teutonic Hanse; and all friends and confederates of both parties, unless they detain lands, pensions or goods of either party or molest his lands, in which case they shall not be held as comprehended. And all the said princes shall be held as comprehended under the above conditions, provided that within six months they certify by letter their acceptance of this comprehension. And the one party of the contrahents may be hired by the other to fight against any of those named in this article, all excuses set apart (et quod [alter]a [p]ars contrahentium ab altera poterit mercede et stipendio conduct at pro parte requirentis et conducentis contra quosvis in hoc articulo nominatos omni allegatione cessante militant).
19. Each monarch to publish this peace throughout his Marches within thirty days from this date.
20. No article in this treaty shall derogate from the article of reformation of attemptates concluded in the truce made at Newcastle 1 October 1533.
21. This treaty to be ratified within two months.

The second treaty provided for the royal marriage;

1. That Prince Edward, eldest son and heir apparent of Henry VIII, now in his sixth year, shall marry Mary queen of Scotland, now in her first year.
2. Upon the consummation of the marriage, if Henry VIII is still alive, he shall assign to the said Mary, as dower, lands in England to the annual value of £2,000 to be increased upon his death to £4,000.
3. Until, by force of this treaty, the said Mary is brought into England she shall remain in custody of the barons appointed thereto by the Three Estates of Scotland; and yet, for her better education and care, the King may send, at his expense, an English nobleman or gentleman, with his wife or other lady or ladies and their attendants, not exceeding 20 in all, to reside with her.
4. Within a month after she completes her tenth year she shall be delivered to commissioners of England at the bounds of Berwick, provided that before her departure from Scotland the contract of marriage has been duly made by proxy.
5. Within two months after the date of this treaty shall be delivered into England six noblemen of Scotland, two of whom, at the least, shall be earls or next heirs of earls and the rest barons or their next heirs, as hostages for the observance on the part of Scotland of these three conditions, viz., the first and fourth articles of this treaty and the condition that if any of these hostages die he shall be replaced within two months by another of equal quality; Scotland, however, is to have power to change the hostages every six months for others of equal quality.
6. Scotland shall continue to be called the kingdom of Scotland and retain its ancient laws and liberties.
7. If after the marriage Prince Edward should die without issue Mary Queen of Scots shall be at liberty to return into Scotland unmarried and free of impediment.
8. Upon her going into England, James earl of Arran, governor of Scotland, who meanwhile shall receive the fruits of that realm, shall receive an acquittance thereof from the King and Prince Edward, a convenient portion for her honourable entry into England reserved.
9. This treaty to be ratified within two months

== See also ==
- List of treaties

== Sources ==
- Herbert Albert Laurens Fisher. The History of England, from the Accession of Henry VII, to the Death of Henry VIII, 1485–1547 (Volume V). Longmans, Green, and Co., 1906.
- Loades, David Michael. John Dudley, Duke of Northumberland, 1504–53. Oxford University Press, 1996. ISBN 0-19-820193-1
- Merriman, Marcus, The Rough Wooings. Tuckwell, 2000, pp 111–136. ISBN 1-86232-090-X
- Letters and Papers Henry VIII, vol. 18 part 1 (London, 1901), nos. 804, 805, British History Online.
