= Dairsie Castle =

Restored tower house in north-east Fife, Scotland

- Dairsie, Fife, Scotland; GB grid reference NO413160
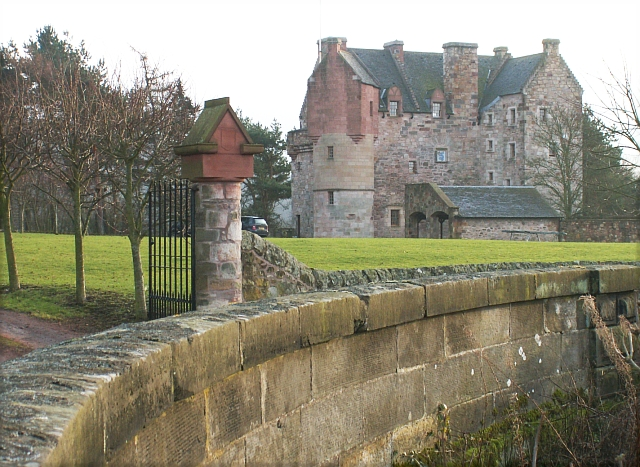
- Dairsie Castle

Site information
- Type: Z-plan tower house
- Owner: Private
- Open to the public: No

Location
- Coordinates: 56°19′59″N 2°57′00″W

Site history
- Built: First castle c.1300 Rebuilt 16th century Rebuilt from ruin in the 1990s
- Built by: Bishops of St Andrews

Dairsie Castle is a restored tower house located 1.3 kilometres (0.81 mi) south of Dairsie in north-east Fife, Scotland. The castle overlooks the River Eden.

== History ==
The first castle built here was the property of the bishops of St Andrews, and may have been constructed by William de Lamberton, bishop of St Andrews from 1298 to 1328. A Scottish parliament was held at the castle in early 1335.

The castle was rebuilt in the 16th century by the Learmonth family. In March 1572, during the Marian Civil War, the Laird of Dairsie, who was Provost of St Andrews, invited two English ambassadors Thomas Randolph and William Drury to banquet at the castle. They refused to come, and, it was said, instead he invited the new archbishop of St Andrews Gavin Hamilton, the minister of St Andrews, Robert Hamilton and William Skene to enjoy the feast he had prepared.

Patrick Learmonth of Dairsie loaned money to William Kirkcaldy of Grange and held some jewels of Mary, Queen of Scots, as a pledge. James Douglas, 4th Earl of Morton, then regent of Scotland, asked him to return the jewels. Regent Morton laid siege to Dairsie Castle in 1575. King James VI of Scotland stayed at Dairsie Castle in 1583 following his escape from the Raid of Ruthven in June 1583. In the 17th century it was sold to John Spottiswoode (1565–1639), Archbishop of St Andrews, who built Dairsie Old Church next to the castle in 1621.

Dairsie Castle became ruinous in the 19th century, but was rebuilt in the 1990s, and is now operated as holiday accommodation. It is a Category B listed building, and was formerly a Scheduled Ancient Monument, having been de-scheduled in 1997 prior to the restoration works.
