= 1730 in Russia =

- Years in Russia: 1727 1728 1729 1730 1731 1732 1733
- Centuries: 17th century · 18th century · 19th century
- Decades: 1700s 1710s 1720s 1730s 1740s 1750s 1760s
- Years: 1727 1728 1729 1730 1731 1732 1733

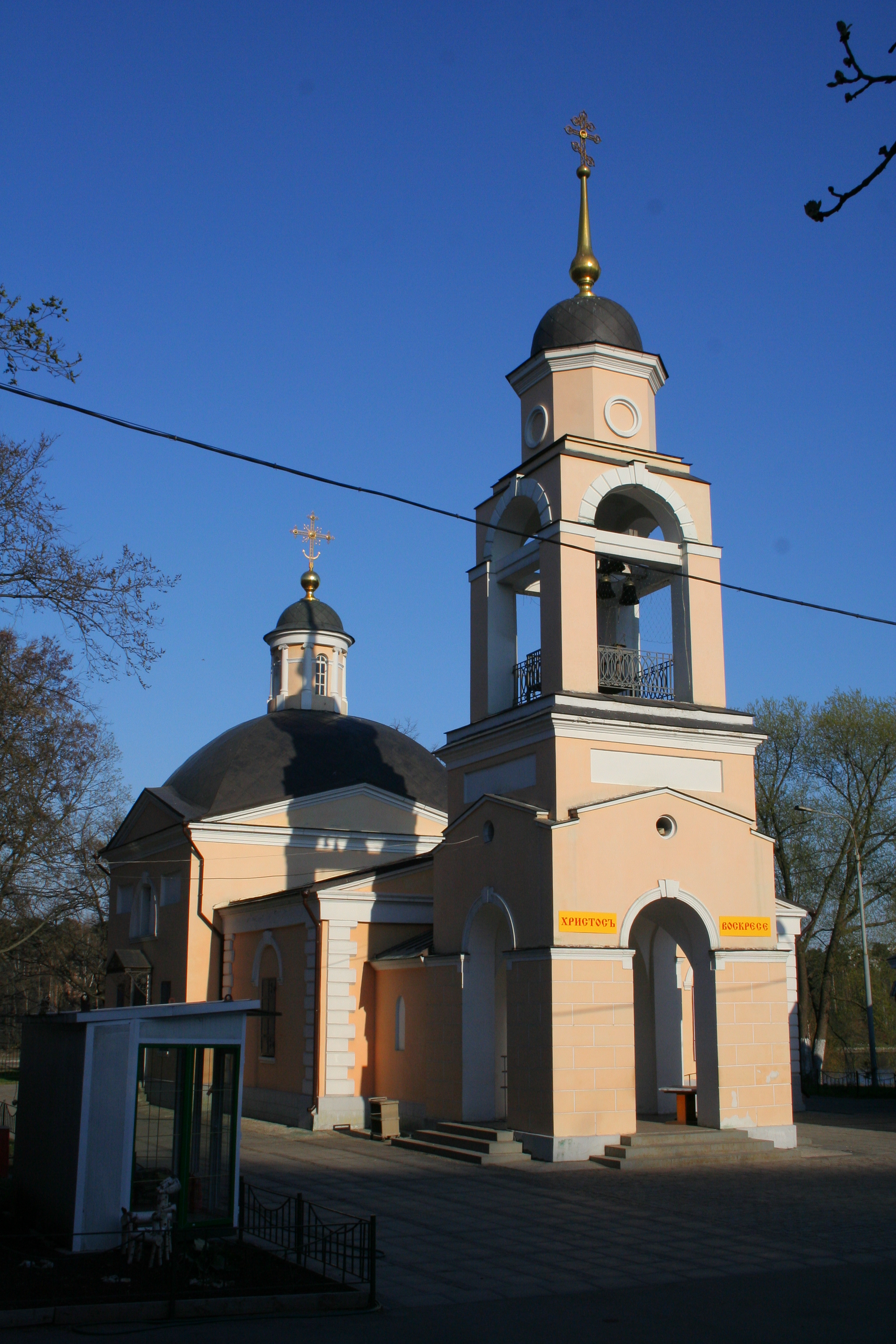
Церковь Космы и Дамиана на Правобережной

Events from the year 1730 in Russia

== Incumbents ==
- Monarch – Peter II (until 30 January [O.S. 19 January] 1730), Anna (after 30 January [O.S. 19 January] 1730)

== Births ==
- 24 November [O.S. 13 November] 1730 - Alexander Suvorov, Russian military leader, considered a national hero. (d. 1800)

== Deaths ==
- 30 January [O.S. 19 January] 1730 - Peter II of Russia, Emperor. (b. 1715)
- Varvara Michajlovna Arsen'eva, royal mistress and courtier (b. 1676)
