= 1729 in Russia =

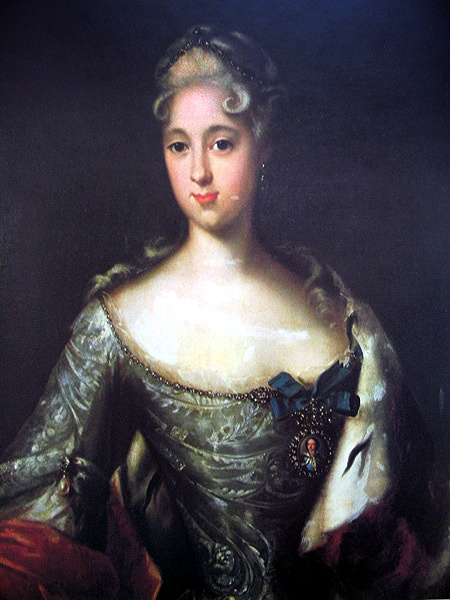
Princess Maria; portrait by Johann Gottfried Tannauer

Events from the year 1729 in Russia

== Incumbents ==
- Monarch – Peter II

== Births ==
- Praskovya Bruce - Russian lady-in-waiting and noble, confidant of Catherine the Great (d. 1785)
- November 24 – Alexander Suvorov, Russian general (d. 1800)
- - Ivan Argunov, painter (d. 1802)

== Deaths ==
- 23 November [O.S. 12 November] - Prince Alexander Danilovich Menshikov, Russian statesman (born 1673)
- 8 January [O.S. 26 December] - Maria Menshikova, fiancée of Grand Duke Peter of Russia (born 1711)
