= Alexander Menshikov =

Alexander Menshikov may refer to:

- Alexander Danilovich Menshikov (1673–1729), Russian statesman
- Alexander Sergeyevich Menshikov (1787–1869), Finnish-Russian nobleman
- Alexander Alexandrovich Menshikov (1714–1764), officer in the Russian army
