= Varvara Arsenyeva =

Russian courtier (1676–1730)

Varvara Mikhailovna Arsenyeva
- Born: Варва́ра Миха́йловна Арсе́ньева; 1676
- Died: 1730 (aged 53–54); Goritsky Monastery
- Noble family: Arsenyev
- Father: Mikhail Afanasyevich Arsenyev
- Occupation: Lady-in-Waiting to Catherine I of Russia; Ober-Hofmeisterin to Maria Menshikova

Varvara Mikhailovna Arsenyeva (Russian: Варва́ра Миха́йловна Арсе́ньева; 1676–1730), was a Russian courtier and mistress of Peter the Great.

== Biography ==
She was the daughter of the yakut Governor Mikhail Afanasyevich Arsenyev. Her sister Daria married Alexander Danilovich Menshikov in 1706. She was appointed lady in waiting to the Empress Catherine, and was for a time the lover of Peter the Great. In 1727, she was appointed Ober-Hofmeisterin to her niece Maria Menshikova, daughter of her sister Daria, who was bethrothed to Grand Duke Peter of Russia. The same year, however, she was exiled to the Alexandrov Kremlin after the fall of Menshikov.

Wishing to be released from captivity, Varvara sent gifts and wrote to the Grand Duchesses Ekaterina and Praskovya, Princess Tatiana Kirillovna Golitsyna, M. M. Rzhevskaya, and other influential ladies of the time, but it was in vain. A year later, the position of the Menshikov's worsened, and it was decided to send the Menshikov and his family to Berezov and Varvara to the Goritsky Monastery where she would be forcibly tonsured under the name Varshanuphia. She would die in the following year.

== Awards ==
On 29 June 1727, Varvara and her nieces Maria and Alexandra were awarded with the Order of Saint Catherine, 1st degree. However the order was withdrawn on 14 October 1727 by Captain Pyrsky who accompanied the family into exile.
