= Santi Vittore e Carlo, Genoa =

Church building in Genoa, Italy

Coordinates: 44°24′54.72″N 8°55′32.54″E

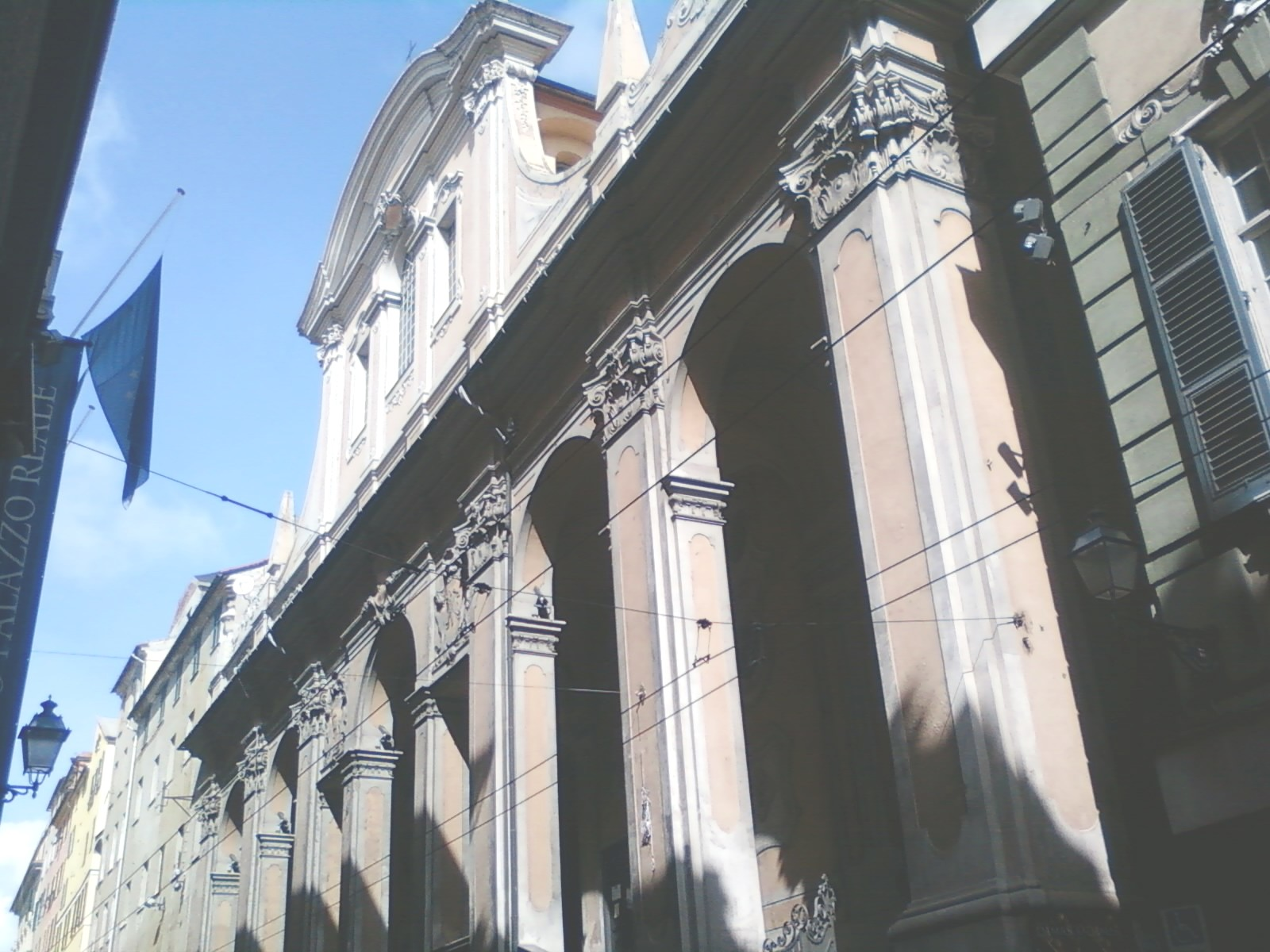
Santi Vittore e Carlo Church Façade

Santi Vittore e Carlo is a Baroque-style church on Via Balbi in central Genoa, Italy. Originally belonging to the Discalced Carmelite Order, the church was constructed in the shape of a Latin Cross between 1629 and 1635 from a design by Bartolomeo Bianco. Designs by Eugenio Durazzo were incorporated in 1743 with the construction of a façade.

Inside the church are a number of works of 17th- and 18th-century artists, including the wooden sculptures Madonna of the Carmine (Alessandro Algardi, 1678) and Angels and Saints (Filippo Parodi, 1680) and paintings by Andrea Carlone (Saint Teresa), Lorenzo De Ferrari (Saints Anne and Young John the Baptist, Francesco di Paola and Liborio), Orazio De Ferrari (Nativity, Adoration of the Magi), Giovanni Maria delle Piane (Decapitation of Sant'Agostino) and Domenico Piola (Saint John of the Cross). The main altar is the remnant of a destroyed church of San Domenico.

Domenico Parodi painted the figure of "Virtue", but many of the decorations were overseen by Maurice Dufour in the last decade of the 19th century, 1890–1898.

== Gallery ==
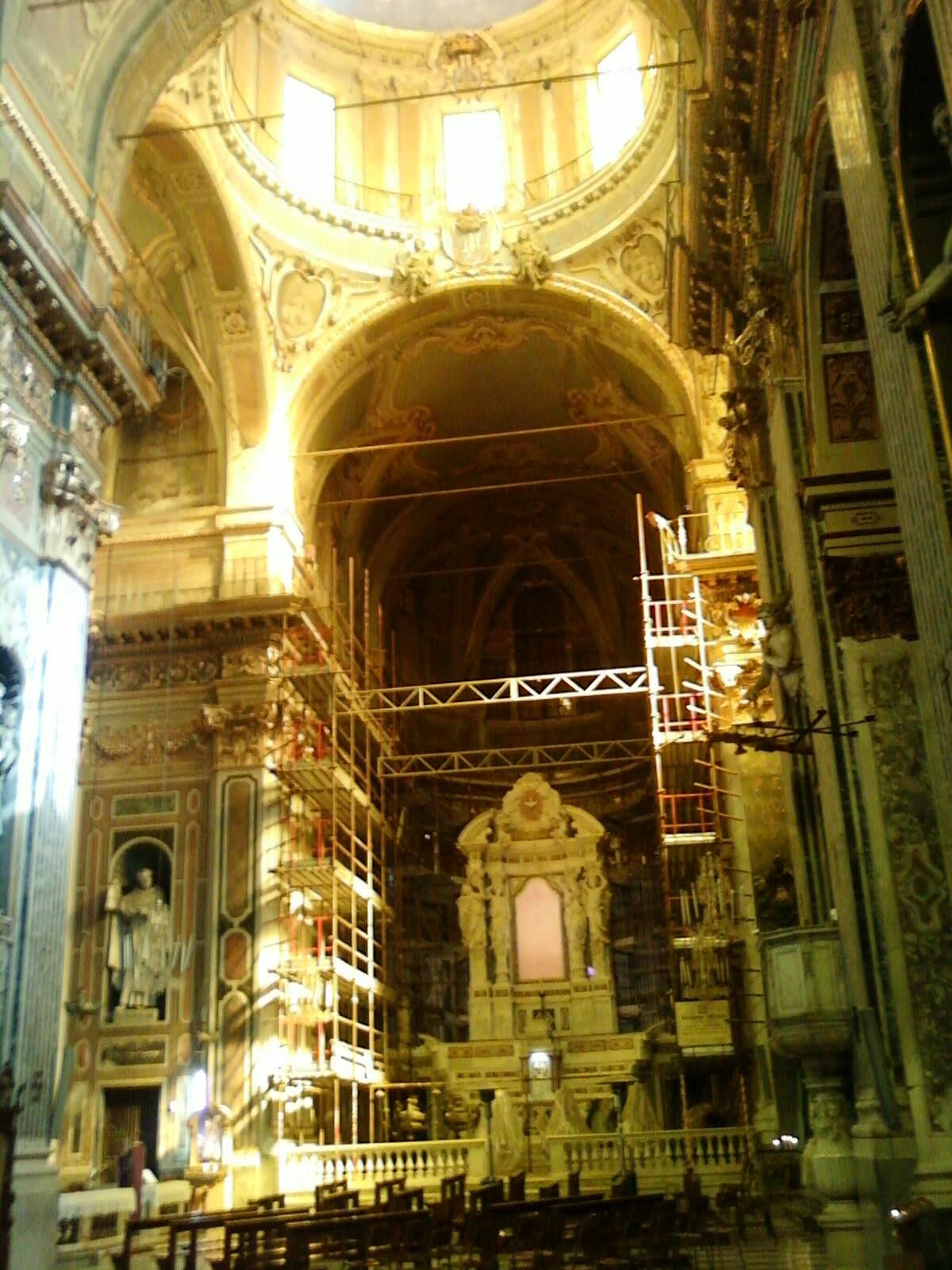
Presbytery

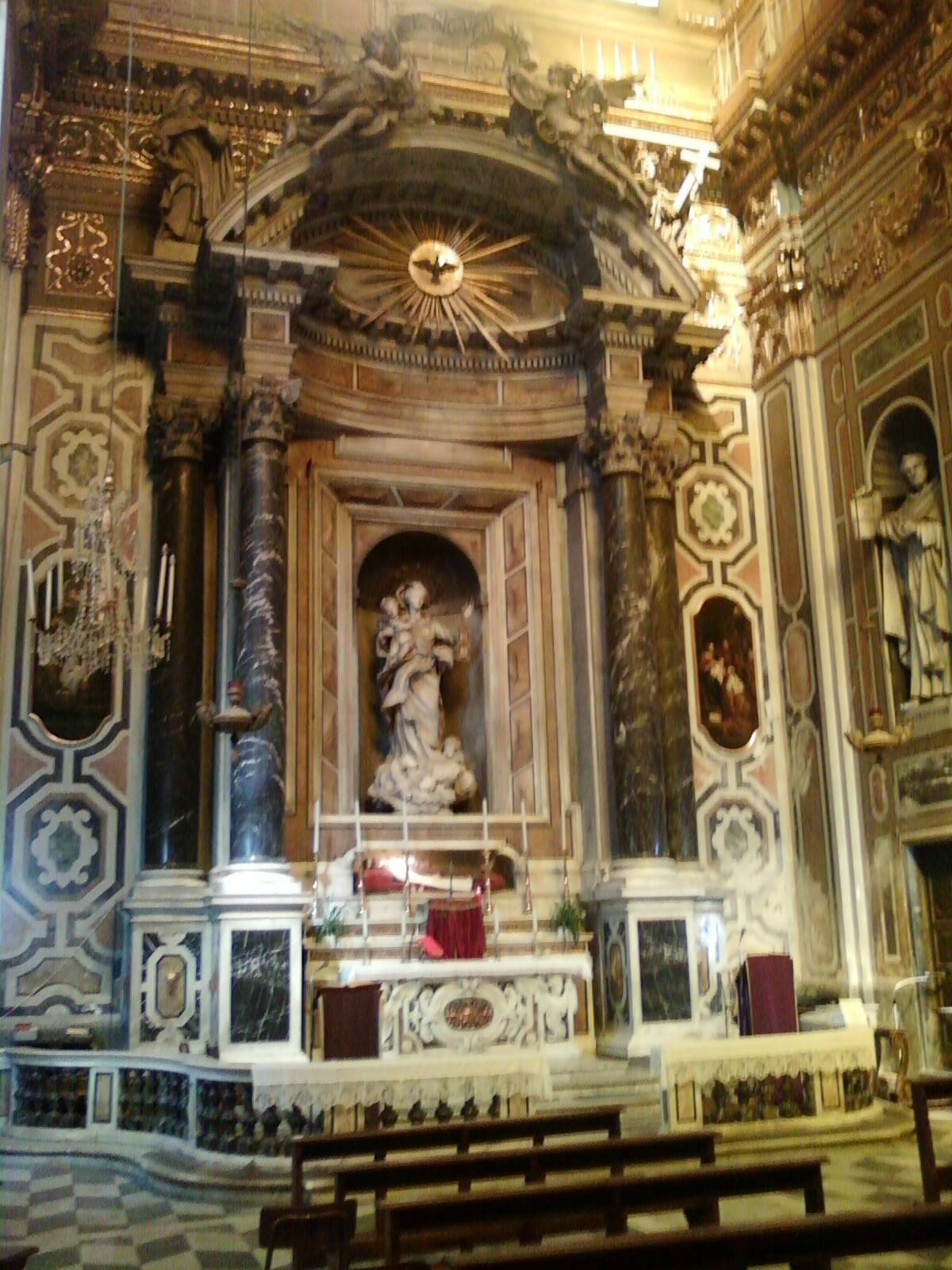
Right transept

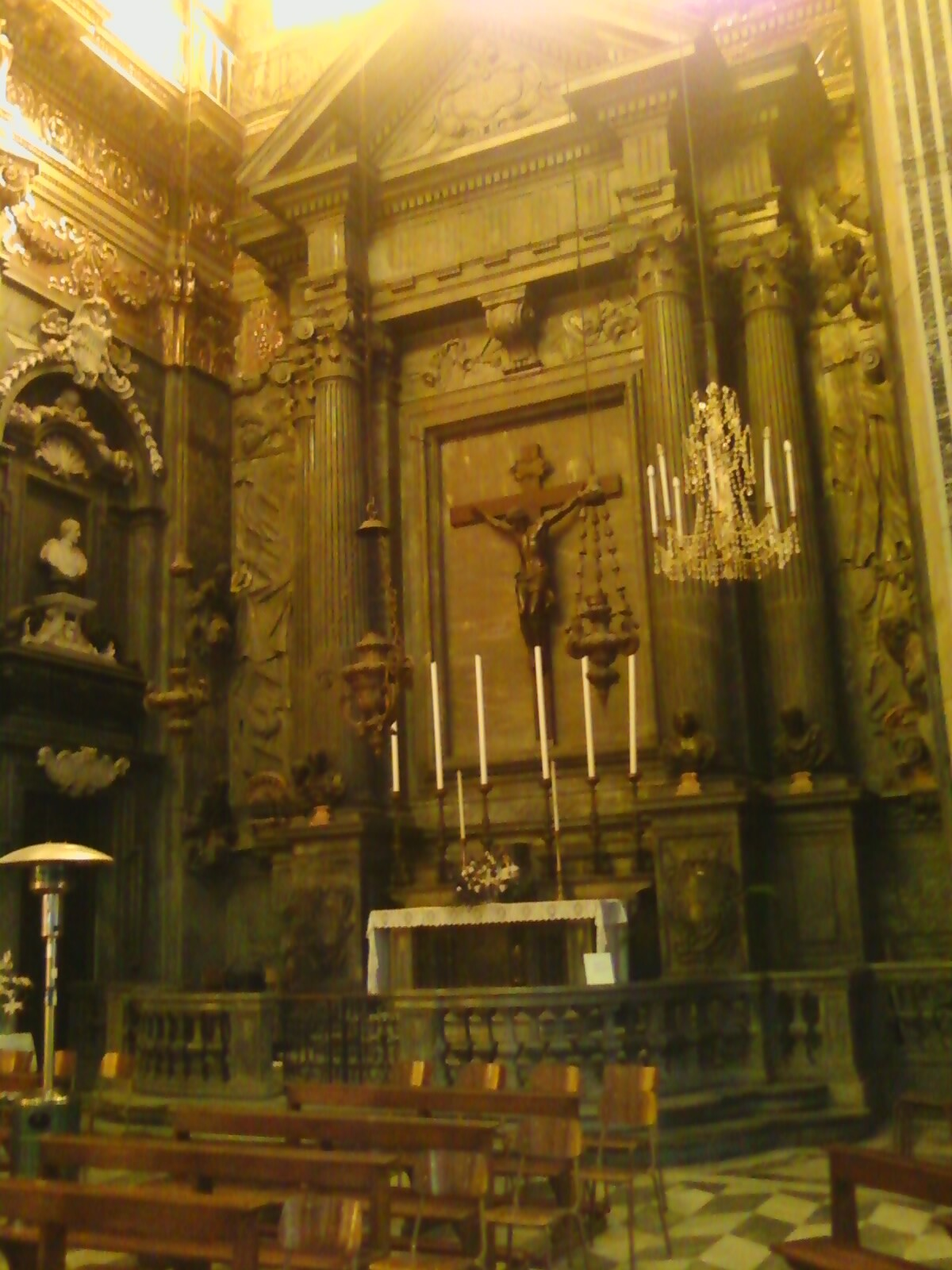
Left transept
