= Angelo de Rossi =

Italian artist (1671–1715)

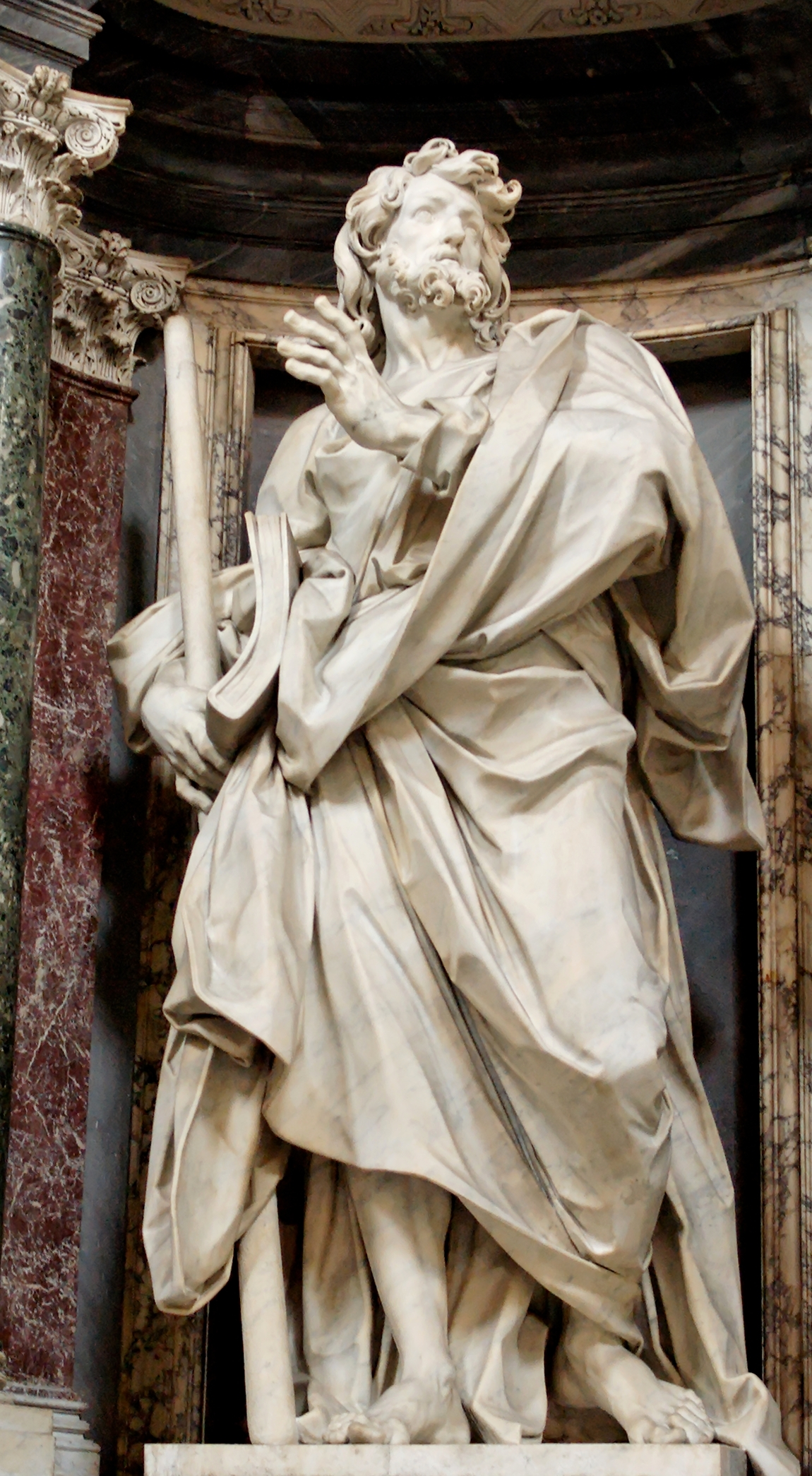
Saint James the Less (1705–11), St. John Lateran, Rome

Angelo de Rossi (1671 – 12 June 1715) was an Italian sculptor. Born in Genoa, he was apprenticed to Filippo Parodi in 1680; Parodi's influence is clear in his first pre-1689 work, a Small Satyr in marble. Nearly unavoidably, he was also influenced by the work of Pierre Puget. He went to Rome in 1688, remaining there until his death; a 1692 relief of Three Men in the Fiery Furnace won first prize in all three sculpture classes at the Accademia di San Luca.

In 1699, Cardinal Pietro Ottoboni appointed de' Rossi court sculptor in the Palazzo della Cancelleria, Rome, and put him in charge of making the Tomb of Pope Alexander VIII, Ottoboni's granduncle, in St. Peter's Basilica (in parts finished after de' Rossi's death). Another important work is the apostle Saint James the Less in St. John Lateran, Rome (1705–11). The commemorative Bust of Arcangelo Corelli (died 1713) in the Protomoteca Capitolina of the Palazzo del Senatore of the Campidoglio, Rome, is also attributed to de' Rossi.

De' Rossi was said to be close friends with Pierre Le Gros. With a promising career ahead, Angelo de' Rossi died prematurely in Rome.

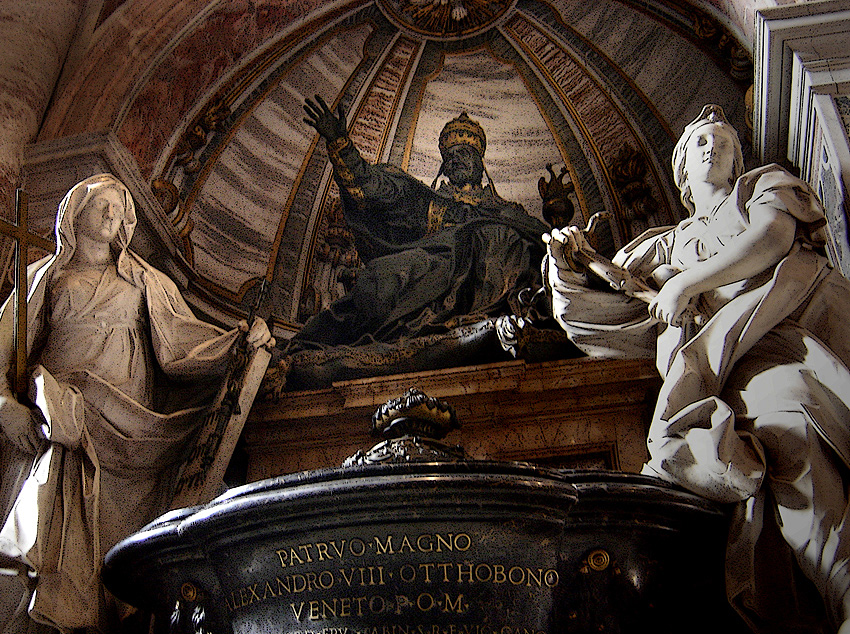
Tomb of Pope Alexander VIII

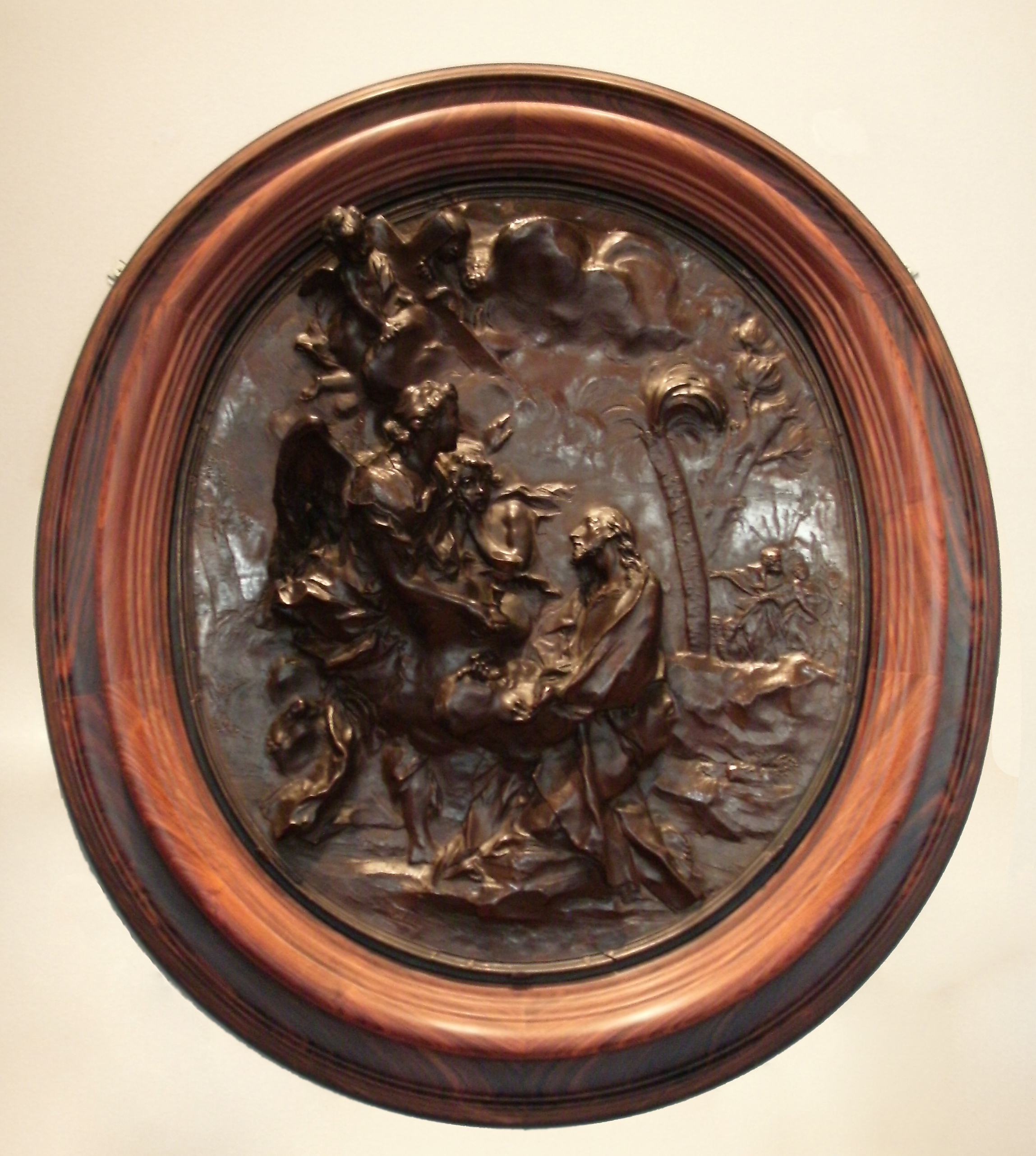
The Agony in the Garden copper relief of c. 1700, National Gallery of Art
