= Francesco Campora =

Italian painter (1693–1763)

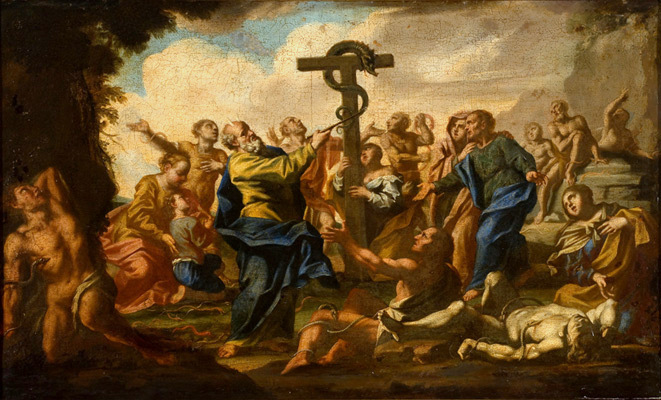
Moses and the Bronze Serpent, Museu Nacional de Belas Artes, Rio de Janeiro

Francesco Campora (16 January 1693 – 19 December 1763) was an Italian painter of the late-Baroque.

== Biography ==
He was born in Rivarolo. He initially trained in Genoa, under Giuseppe Palmieri, then under Domenico Parodi, but moved to Naples by the age of twenty years to study in the studio of Francesco Solimena. He would return to Genoa via Rome. Among his works, mostly for churches, were Jesus giving Peter the Keys for the church of Santa Maria delle Grazie in Genoa; Sbarco delle ceneri del Battista for the Oratory of Santo Cristo at Sestri Ponente; Saints Nicolas and Erasmus with the Virgin for the church of Sant' Erasmo at Voltri; a Saints Michael and Francis of Sales for the church of Gesù e Maria, Genoa; Repose in Egypt for the church of San Francesco d'Albaro; a Saints Rocco and Isidore for the church of Rivarolo Ligure, Marriage of the Virgin for the church of San Siro; and altarpiece of St John the Baptists and other saints for the Cathedral of Sarzana (La Spezia). He was a member of the Accademia Ligustica di Belle Arti founded in 1751. Campora died in Genoa in 1763.

== Bibliography ==
- Lanzi, Luigi (1847). History of Painting in Italy; From the Period of the Revival of the Fine Arts to the End of the Eighteenth Century. Vol. III. Translated by Thomas Roscoe. London: Henry G. Bohn. p. 285.
- Costa Calcagno, Paola (1974). "CAMPORA, Francesco". Dizionario Biografico degli Italiani (in Italian). Vol. 17: Calvart–Canefri. Rome: Istituto dell'Enciclopedia Italiana. ISBN 978-88-12-00032-6.
