= Giacomo Antonio Ponsonelli =

Italian sculptor (1654–1735)

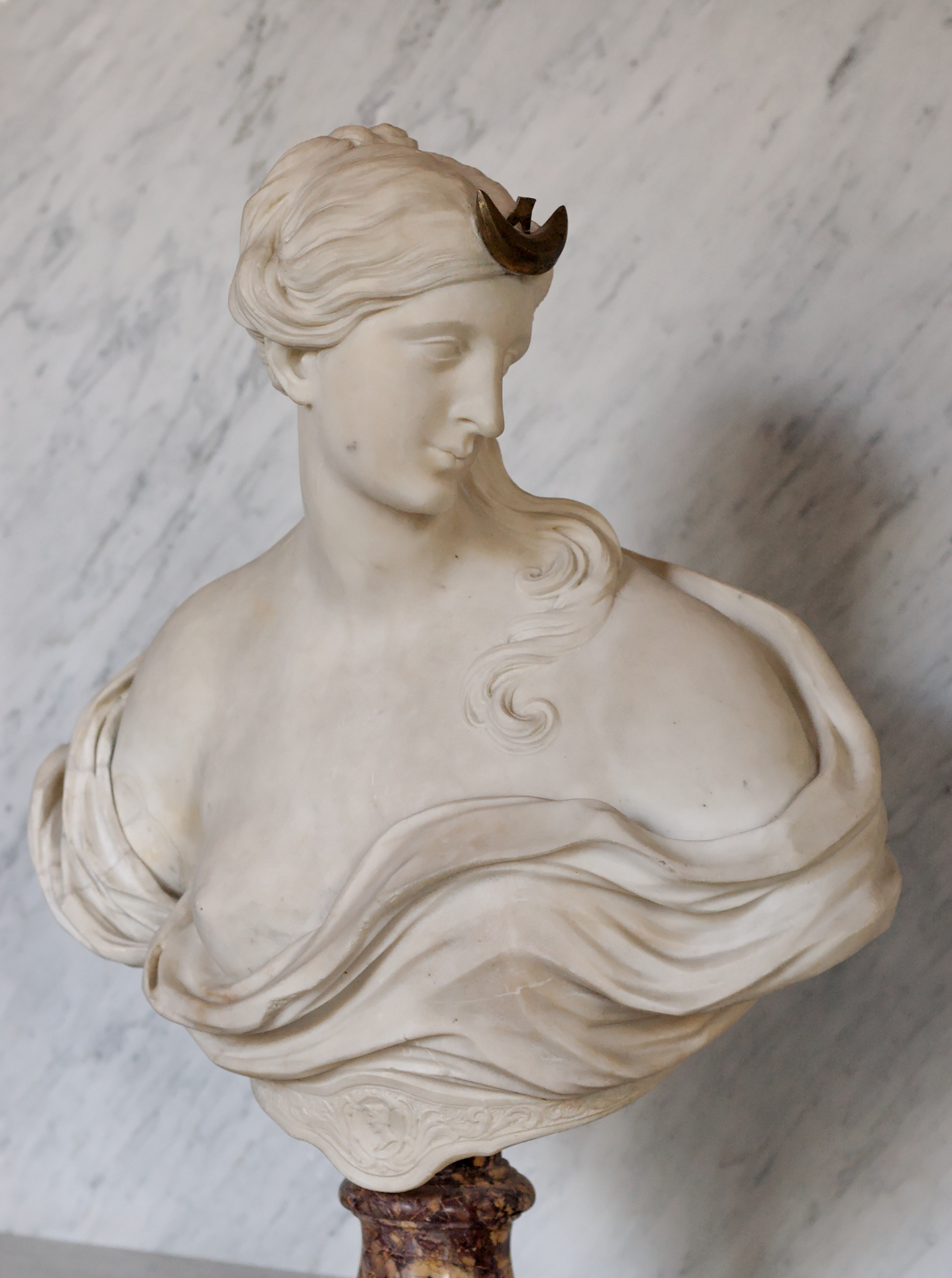
Bust of Diana (Louvre)

Giacomo Antonio Ponsonelli (1654–1735) was an Italian late-Baroque sculptor.

Born in Massa Carrara, where he first worked under his father, Giovanni Ponsonelli, a sculptor, in Finale Liguria and Savona. He worked in Genoa under his father-in-law Filippo Parodi for many years and was involved in portraiture. He accompanied Parodi to Venice and Padua. His studio became prolific after Parodi died in 1702. He sent statues and reliefs to Albissola, Cádiz, and Lisbon. His portrait of Marcantonio Grillo is in the Albergo dei Poveri in Genoa. His pupil, Pasquale Bocciardo (c. 1710 – c. 1791), completed posthumously the dramatic high altar for the church of Nostra Signora delle Vigne in Genoa.
