= Sebastiano Bombelli =

Italian painter (1635–1719)

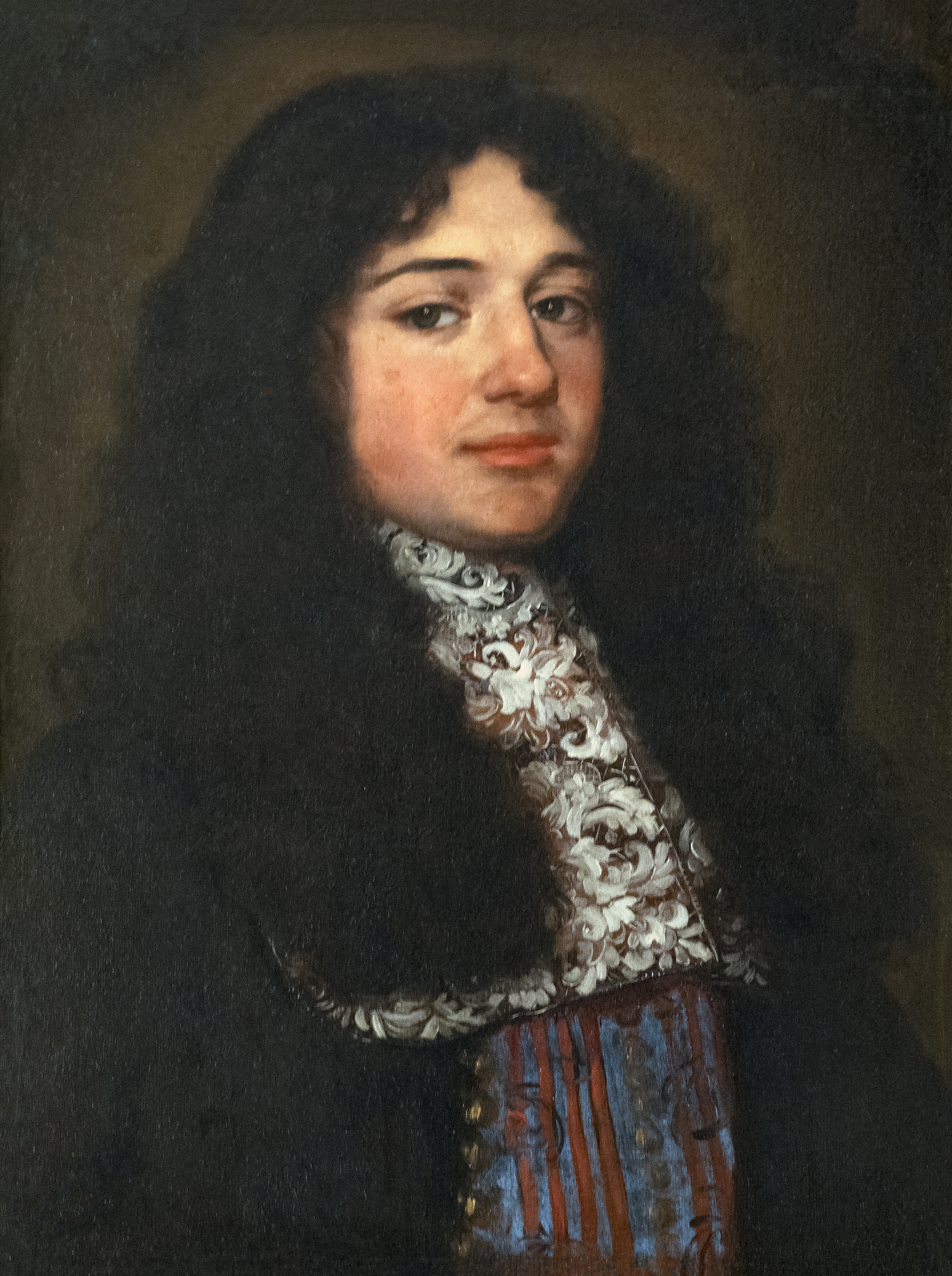
- Portrait of Gerolamo Querini, 1669, Pinacoteca Querini Stampalia, Venice
- Born: October 1635; Udine, Republic of Venice
- Died: 7 May 1719 (aged 83); Venice, Republic of Venice
- Education: Guercino
- Known for: Painting
- Movement: Baroque, Venetian School

Sebastiano Bombelli (October 1635 – 4 May 1719) was an Italian painter, mainly active in Venice, during the Baroque period.

== Biography ==
He was born in Udine on 14 or 15 October 1635 (baptised on the 15th), educated and trained under the guidance of his father Valentino and the godfather Girolamo Lugaro, he moved from a young age to Venice where, after a period of specialization with Guercino in Bologna, he began his career studying the manner of Paolo Veronese, quickly becoming one of his greatest connoisseurs.

The synthesis of the techniques of Cinquecento, of the impulse given by naturalists and of the contemporary taste of the "tenebrosi" was addressed by Bombelli in the sector in which he specialized most, namely portraiture. Not to underestimate his stay in Florentine, during which he was able to appreciate the technique of Sustermans.

His first surviving work dates back to 1665, it is the Portrait of Benedetto Mangilli (Civici Musei, Galleria d'Arte Antica, Udine), a painting that shows influences from Bernardo Strozzi.

Among the peculiar characteristics of his works emerge vitality, expressiveness and communicability, both in the portraits anchored to the tradition Baroque like the Polo Querini of 1684 (Querini Stampalia Foundation, Venice) and in the most simplified ones. His characters emerge from the shadows, although described to the smallest detail, showy with their showy and festive attires.

Del 1675 is the first Self-portrait (Civici Musei, Galleria d'Arte Antica, Udine), characterised by a marked introspective vein and free from the embellishments typical of the official portrait which had made it famous to Venice.

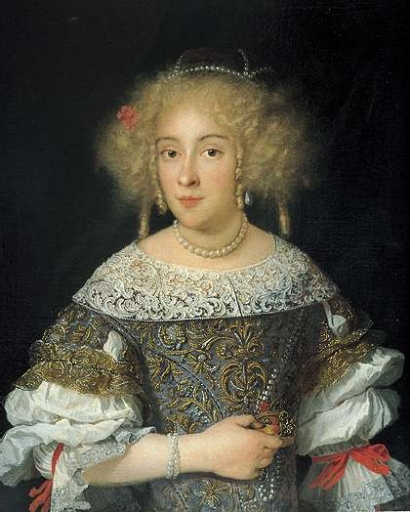
Portrait of Isabella del Sera, around 1671

One of his many followers was Fra' Galgario (Giuseppe Vittore Ghislandi), who spent a decade in Venice and had the opportunity to meet and collaborate with Bombelli. For a time he also studied in his workshop a young man Anton Domenico Gabbiani, who learned much from Bombelli (see his first portraits, like those of the Musicians of the court of the Grand Prince Ferdinando de 'Medici at the Galleria dell'Accademia); the two artists remained on excellent terms throughout their lives, as demonstrated by a beautiful letter from Bombelli addressed to the former student in 1716. He was also the master of Domenico and Giovanni Battista Parodi, sons of the Genoese sculptor Filippo Parodi, a personal friend of the friulian painter; Bombelli's fame as a skilled portrait painter was known internationally, so much so that one of his pupils was Johann Gottfried Tannauer, famous painter and miniaturist at the court of Tsar Peter the Great of Russia. He was also very fond of friendship and affection with the fellow Luca Carlevarijs and with the young and promising Rosalba Carriera, of whom he painted an intense portrait on the occasion of his appointment to Academia di San Luca. His portraiture style later also influenced other painters, including Alessandro Longhi and Niccolò Cassana.

Bombelli had a half-brother, Raffaele, also a painter, less well known than Sebastiano and active in the Friuli area.

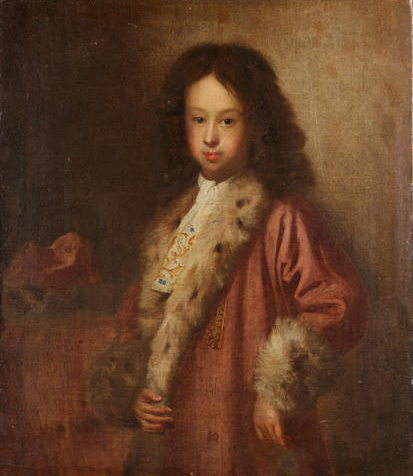
Portrait of Joseph Clement of Bavaria

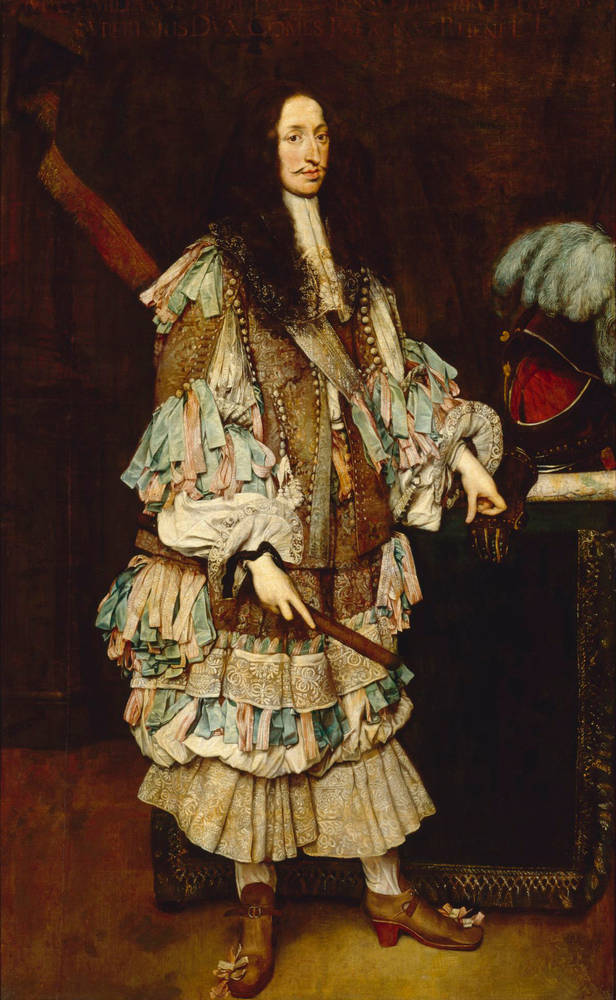
Portrait of Maximilian Philip Jerome of Bavaria, 1666

The artist also traveled and worked abroad, for example in Bavaria, where he portrayed the Elector Ferdinand Maria of Bavaria, his wife Enrichetta Adelaide di Savoia, the children Maria Anna Vittoria of Bavaria, Maximilian II Emanuel of Bavaria, Joseph Clement of Bavaria and his brother Maximilian Philip Jerome of Bavaria, to Innsbruch portraying the Archduchess Anna de 'Medici and the daughters Claudia Felicita of Austria (future emperor's Leopold I second wife) and Mary Magdalene, for the dukes of Brunswick-Lüneburg, as well as Vienna where he portrayed the emperor Leopold I of Habsburg and the couple Joseph I of Habsburg and Wilhelmina Amalia of Brunswick-Lüneburg, was also active in Florence, Mantua and Parma and lent his service to some cardinals. His atelier in Venice was very famous and frequented by important personalities passing through Venice, in particular during Carnival: on this occasion he portrayed the prince in 1692 Frederick of Denmark (future king Frederick IV).

Sebastiano Bombelli was also an art expert: being the greatest connoisseur of Paolo Veronese, he was often contacted to verify the authenticity of works that surfaced on the market. Concurrently with this activity, Bombelli was also a restorer. Unfortunately, to give new brilliance to ancient artworks, he used paints and lacquers that - with the passing of time - oxidised, blackening the paint film. Various sources, contemporary and non-contemporary, refer to this information, in particular Lanzi. His mastery of the use of colors, however, was much appreciated, to the extent that he was the dedicatee of the text Nuovo plico d'ogni sorte di tinture by Gallipido Tallier - published in 1704 - and the painter was addressed with these words «... knowing the world the virtue, which she generally possesses of coloring and painting; And I am going to say, that the opre of his penoron have a not that of celestial, which dazzles the sight to whom they aim ...».

He was a member of the fraglia pictorial of Venice from 1687 to 1700.

Infirm in the last years of his life, he died in Venice on 4 May 1719. His executors were the beloved and powerful nephews Paolo and Girolamo Celotti, both Servite friars.

== Bibliography ==
- "BOMBELLI, Sebastiano". Web Gallery of Art.
- Steer, John (1970). A Concise History of Venetian Painting. London: Thames and Hudson. p. 131.
- Bryan, Michael (1886). Dictionary of Painters and Engravers, Biographical and Critical. Vol. I: A-K. London: George Bell & Sons. p. 150.
- Aldo Rizzi (1969). "Bombelli, Sebastiano". Dizionario Biografico degli Italiani (in Italian). Vol. 11: Boccadibue–Bonetti. Rome: Istituto dell'Enciclopedia Italiana. ISBN 978-88-12-00032-6.
- Rizzi, Aldo (1964). Mostra del Bombelli e del Carneo. Udine: Doretti.
