= Filippo Parodi =

Italian sculptor (1630–1702)

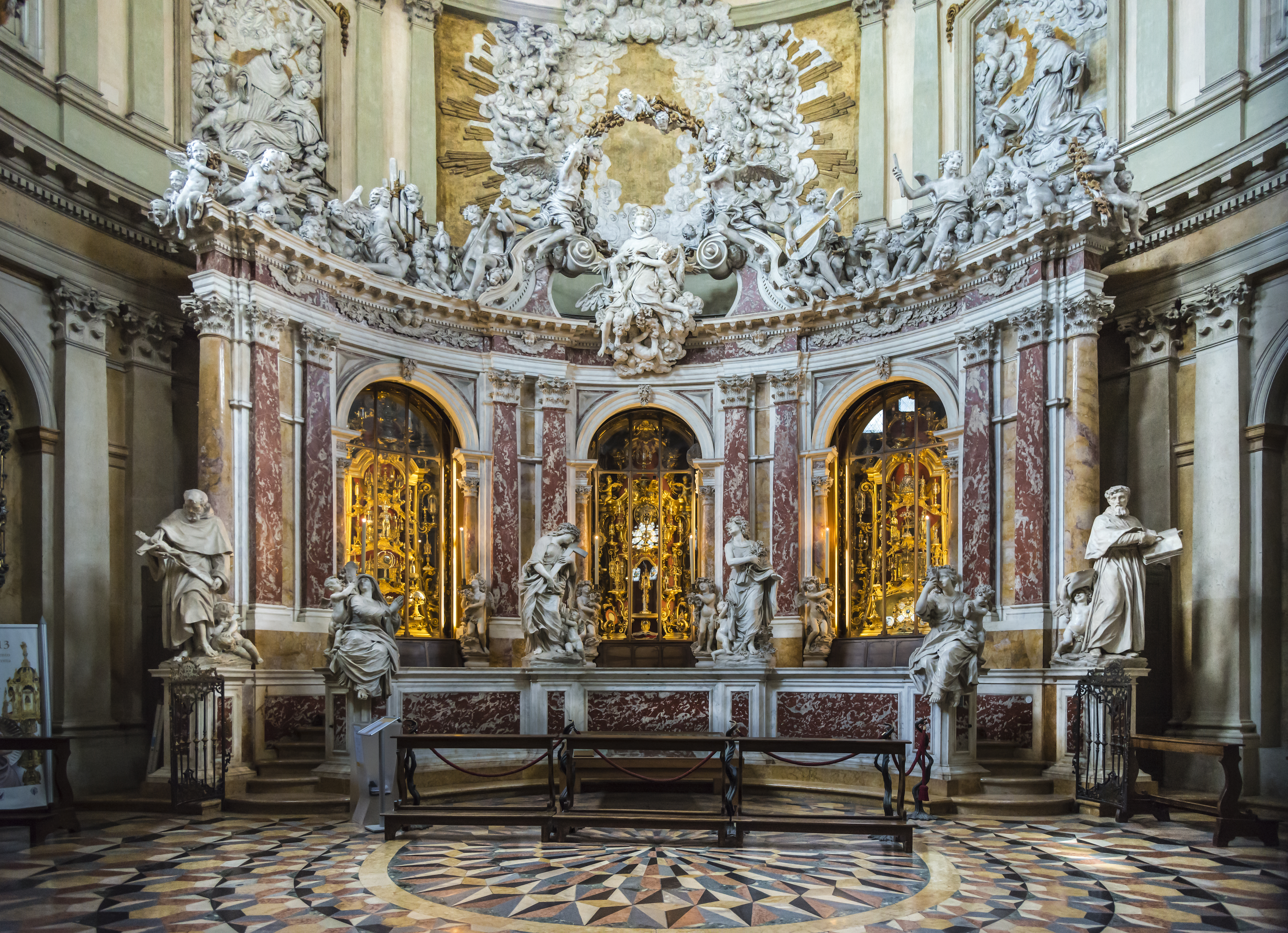
- Glory of Saint Anthony by Parodi and assistants, 1689-97 (Basilica of Saint Anthony of Padua
- Born: 1630; Genoa, Italy
- Died: July 22, 1702 (aged 71–72)
- Style: marble sculptor
- Family: Domenico Parodi

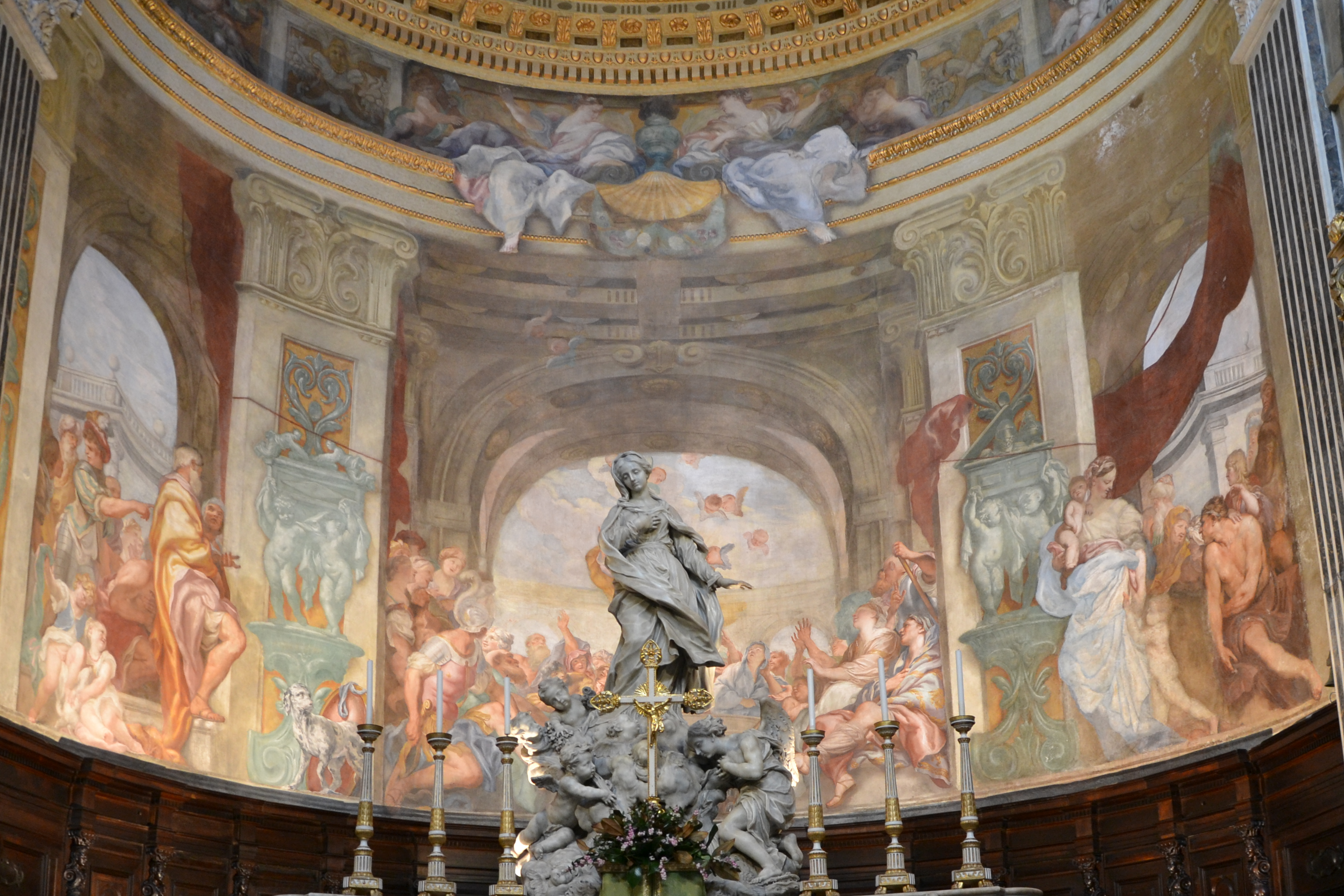
Genova, san luca, immacolata di Filippo Parodi, affreschi di domenico piola, 1695

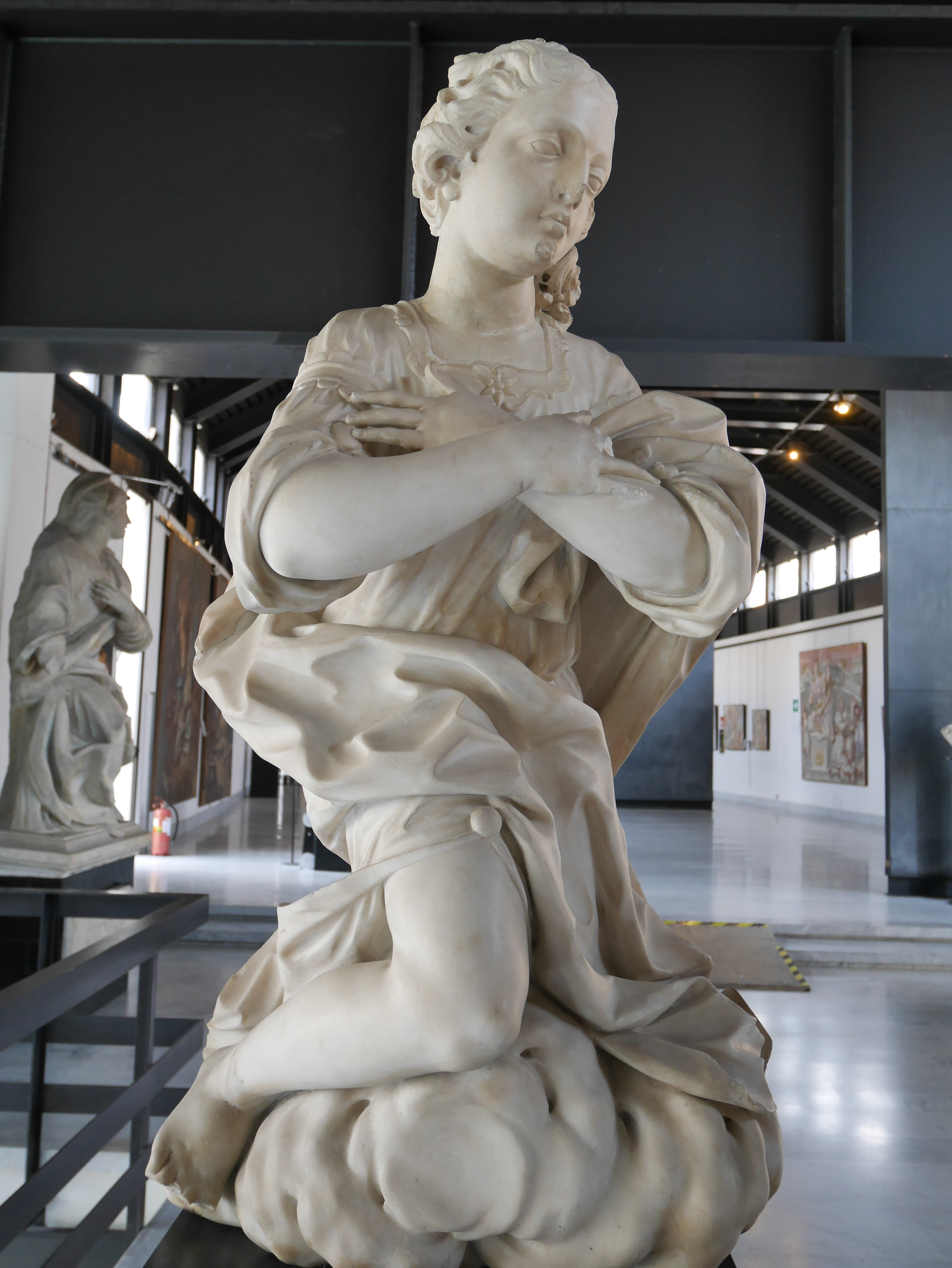
(Museo di Sant'Agostino di Genova)

Filippo Parodi (1630 – 22 July 1702) was an Italian sculptor of the Baroque period, "Genoa's first and greatest native Baroque sculptor".

== Biography ==
Filippo Parodi was born in Genoa into a family of sculptors. His father, Giovanni Battista, was a woodcarver. Filippo trained in the family workshop. Having developed his facility with wood, he then transferred his mastery to marble in the 1670s. He also worked in stucco.

His two extended sojourns in Rome refined his style; he joined the studio of Bernini as an assistant (1655–1661), although he appears to have been influenced by Algardi and his pupil Ercole Ferrata. Under Bernini, Parodi learned to exploit the sensuous and tactile possibilities of the marble to enhance the emotional impact. The influence of the Roman Baroque style permeates his early work. Later on returning to Genoa, he met the French Baroque sculptor Pierre Puget, who stayed in Genoa from 1661–1666. Parodi developed a large studio to handle a large number of commissions.

In Genoa during the 1661-1670s, he completed an Ecstasy of Saint Martha for Santa Marta, a Saint John for Santa Maria di Carignano, and a Virgin and Child for Santi Vittore e Carlo.

In Venice, he completed the elaborate funeral Monument of Bishop Francesco Morosini (1678), in San Nicolò da Tolentino.

For Johann Adam Andreas I von Liechtenstein of Vienna, he produced two allegorical busts: Vice and Virtue, which remain in the Liechtenstein collection, Vienna. The expressive bust of Vice has a specific Bernini source in Bernini's Anima dannata.

His sculptures commissioned by Eugenio Durazzo in 1679 during the renovation of the Palazzo Balbi Durazzo, Genoa, remain in situ (the present Palazzo Reale); they are a sentimental Christ at the Column for the chapel and a set of four mythological figures from Ovid's Metamorphoses (Venus, Clytie, Adonis, and Hyacinth) for the garden. The statues are emotive and often witty reworkings of sculptures by Bernini.

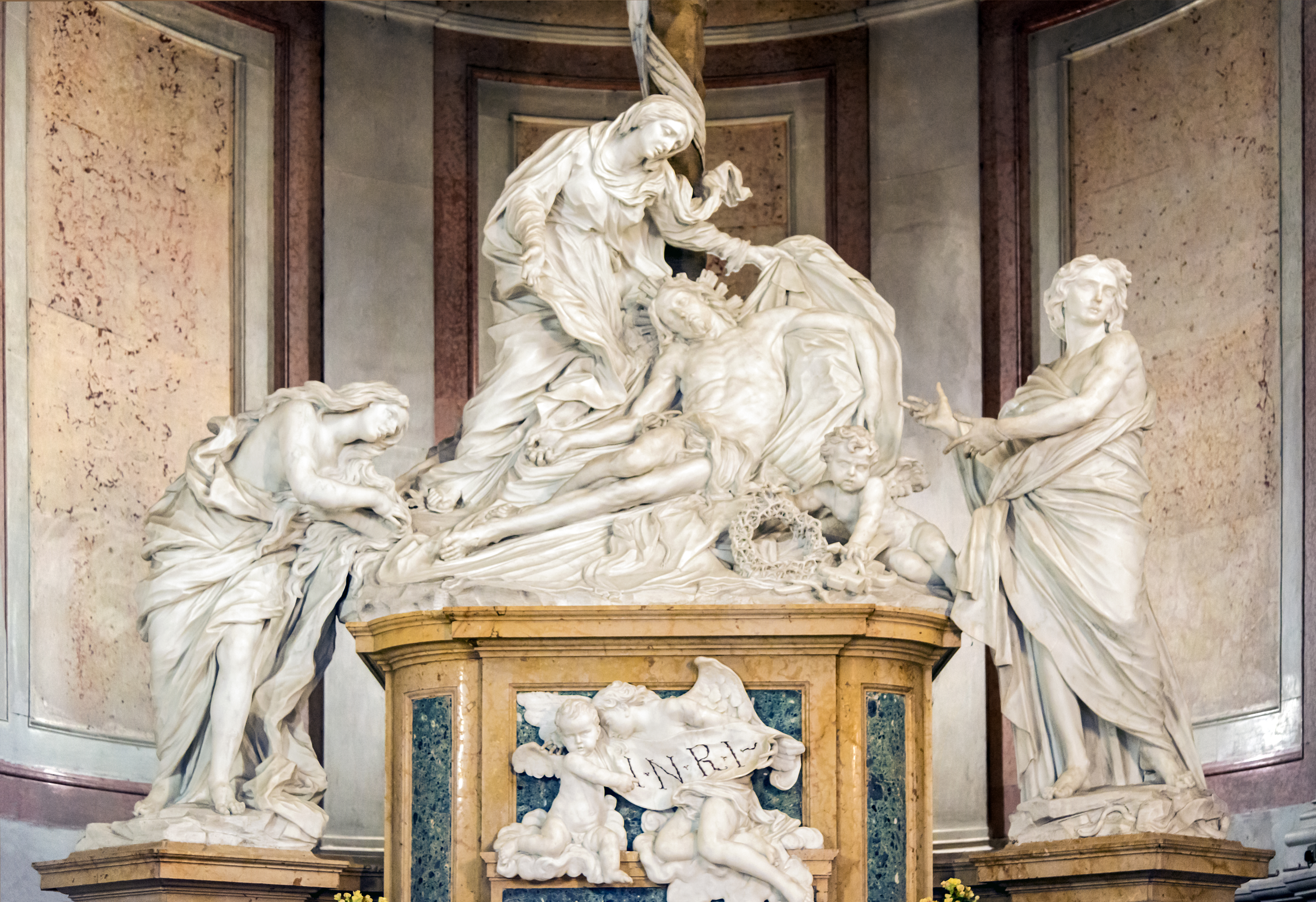
Chapel of La Pieta - Santa Giustina (Padua)

In 1689, Parodi was in charge of the architectural, decorative and sculptural design of the Cappella della Pietà in the abbey church of Santa Giustina. The ceiling is adorned with stucco angels. In the center is the Pietà, surrounded by statues of Mary Magdalene and John the Apostle. In 1691 he and his studio were responsible for the six white marble sculptures of saints and the Glory of Saint Anthony (1689–97) in the polychrome marble setting of the Cappella del Tesoro ("Chapel of the Treasure") at the Basilica of Saint Anthony of Padua. The cornice is crowded with celebrative angels by his student, Pietro Roncaioli, a stuccador from Lugano.

Parodi also worked with Giacomo Antonio Ponsonelli (1654–1735) an Italian late-Baroque sculptor who was also his son-in-law. Parodi's son, Domenico Parodi (1672–1742), was a painter of some merit, initially apprenticed with Sebastiano Bombelli, then, in the early 1690s, working in the studios of Carlo Maratta and then his pupil Paolo Girolamo Piola. Other pupils of Parodi were Angelo de' Rossi, Andrea Brustolon, the brothers Francesco, Francesco Bonanni, and Bernardo Schiaffino.

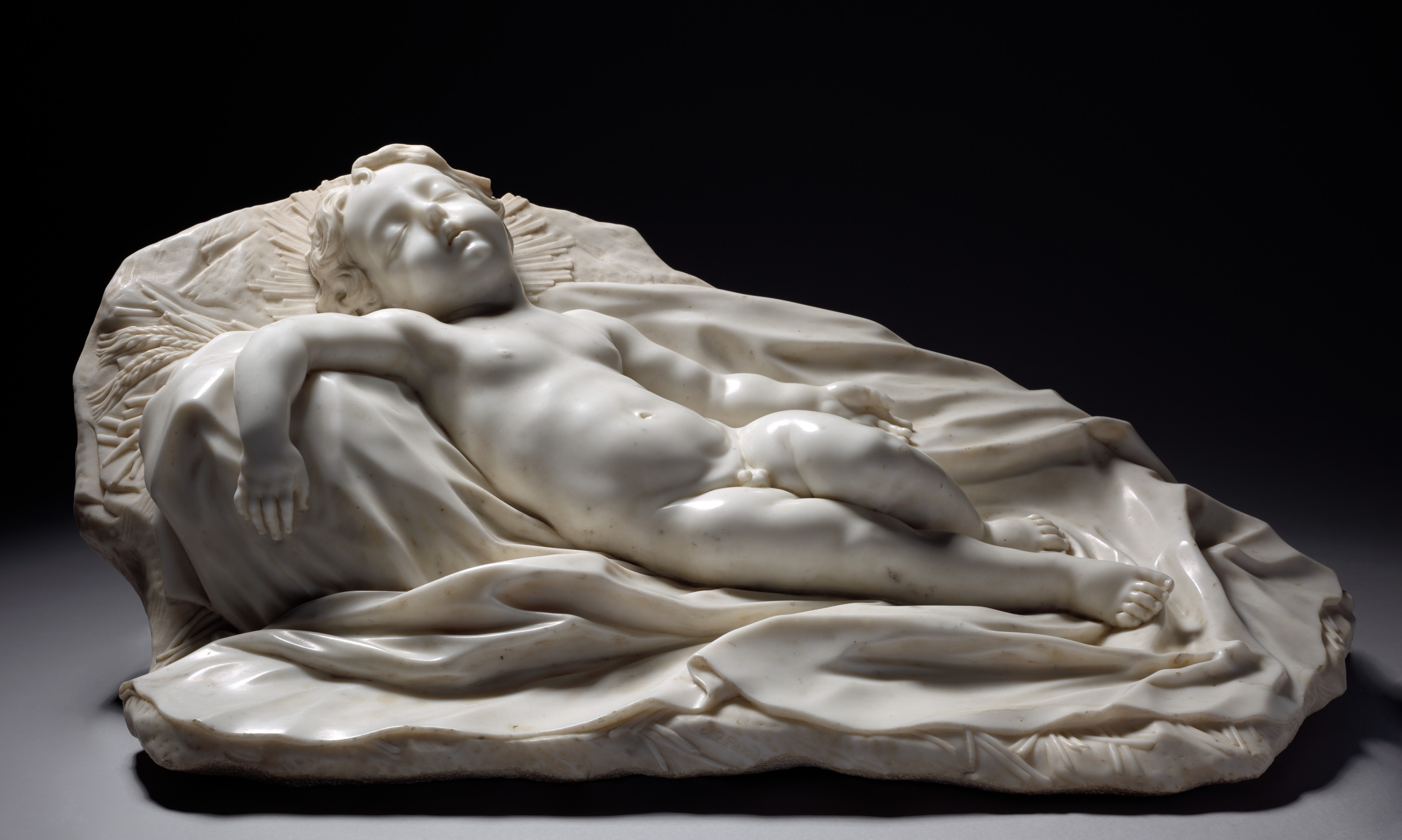
Sleeping Christ Child, Cleveland Museum of Art

== Other works ==
- Glory of the Magdalene, high altar, S. Maria delle Vigne, Genoa .
- Boy with a Skull (Vanitas) Hermitage Museum, Saint Petersburg
- Sleeping Christ Child (Cleveland Museum of Art)
- Winter from a set of Seasons (Cleveland Museum of Art).
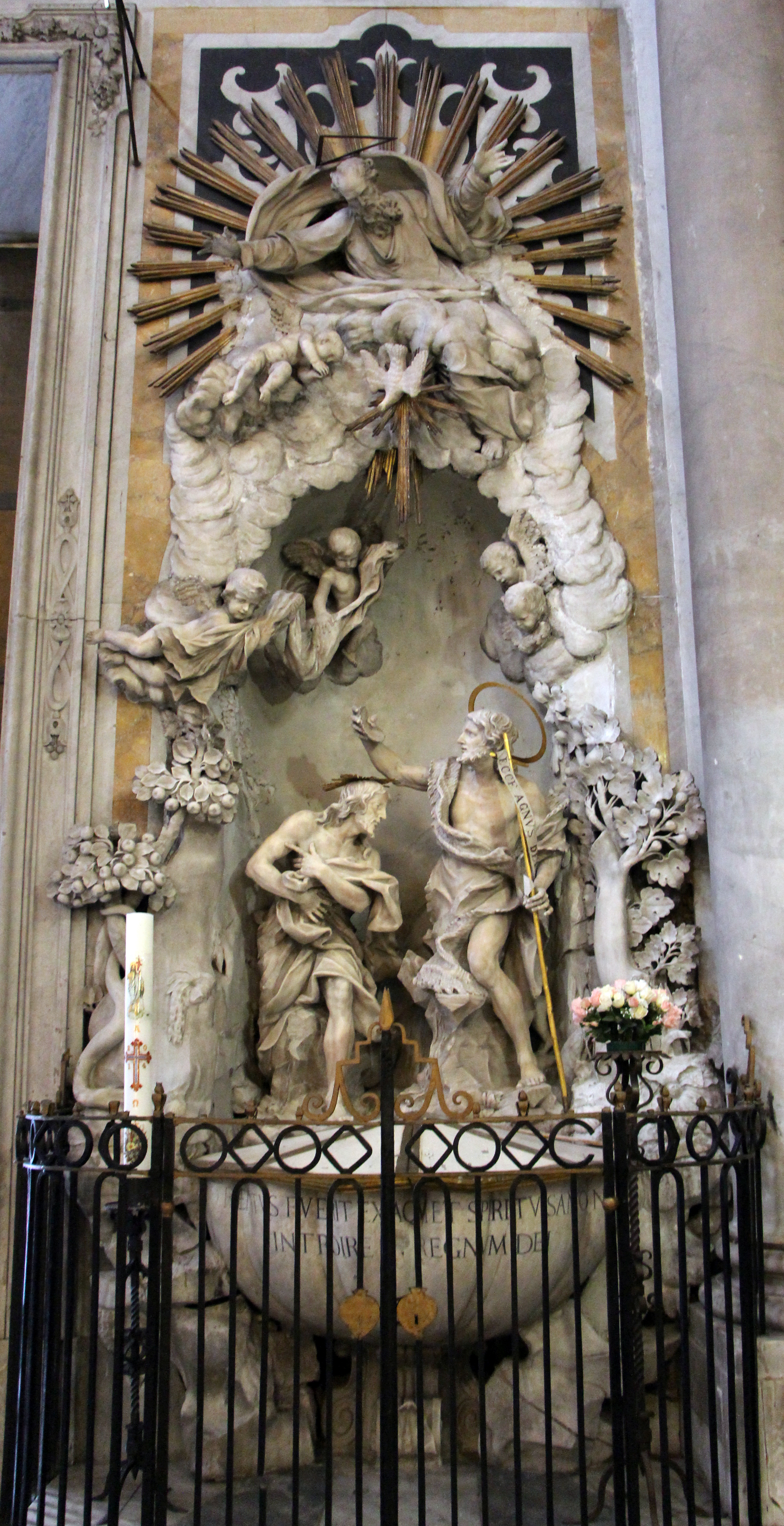
Baptism of Christ, Santa Maria delle Vigne, Genoa

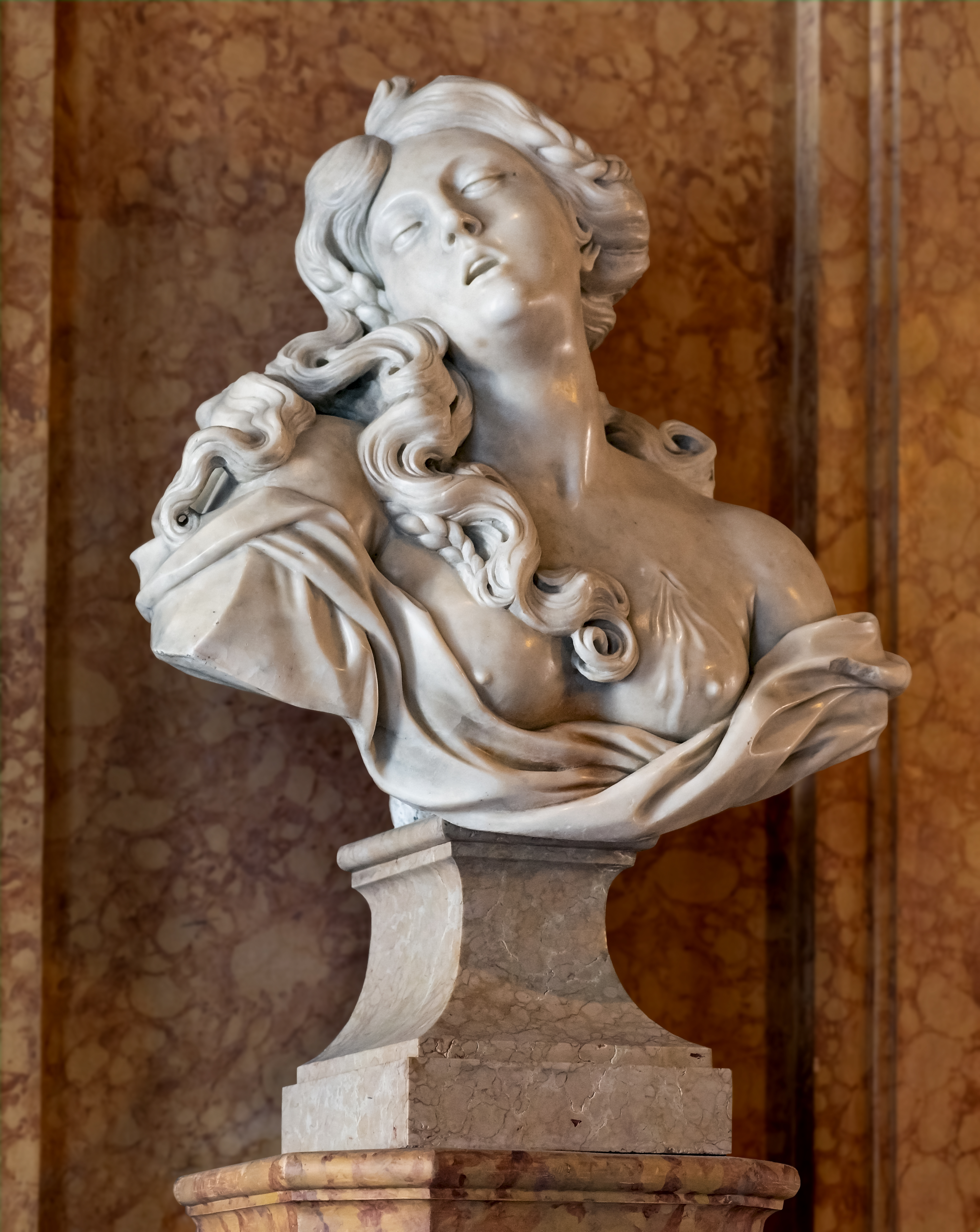
Lucretia

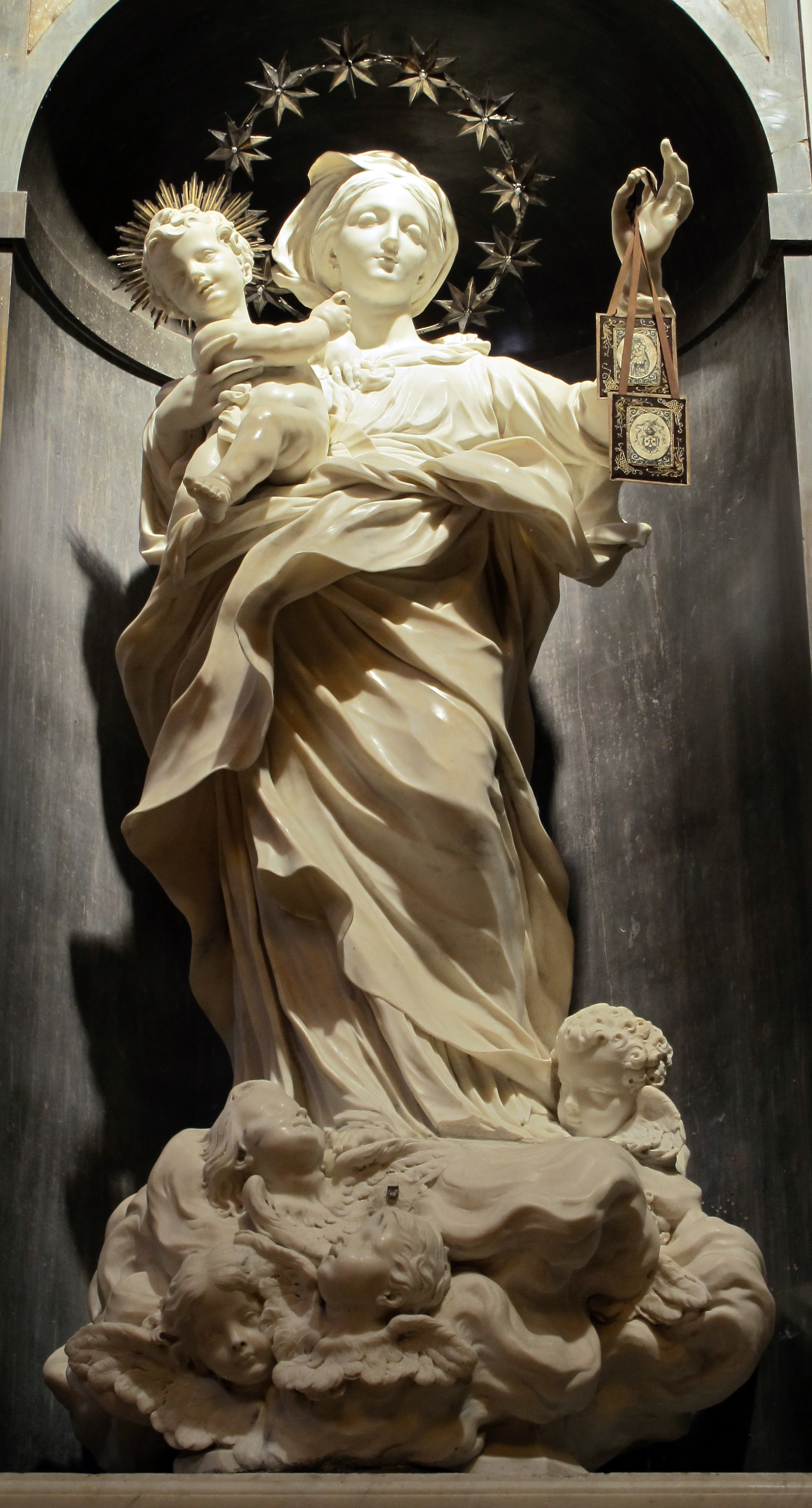
Madonna del Carmine, Santi Vittore e Carlo

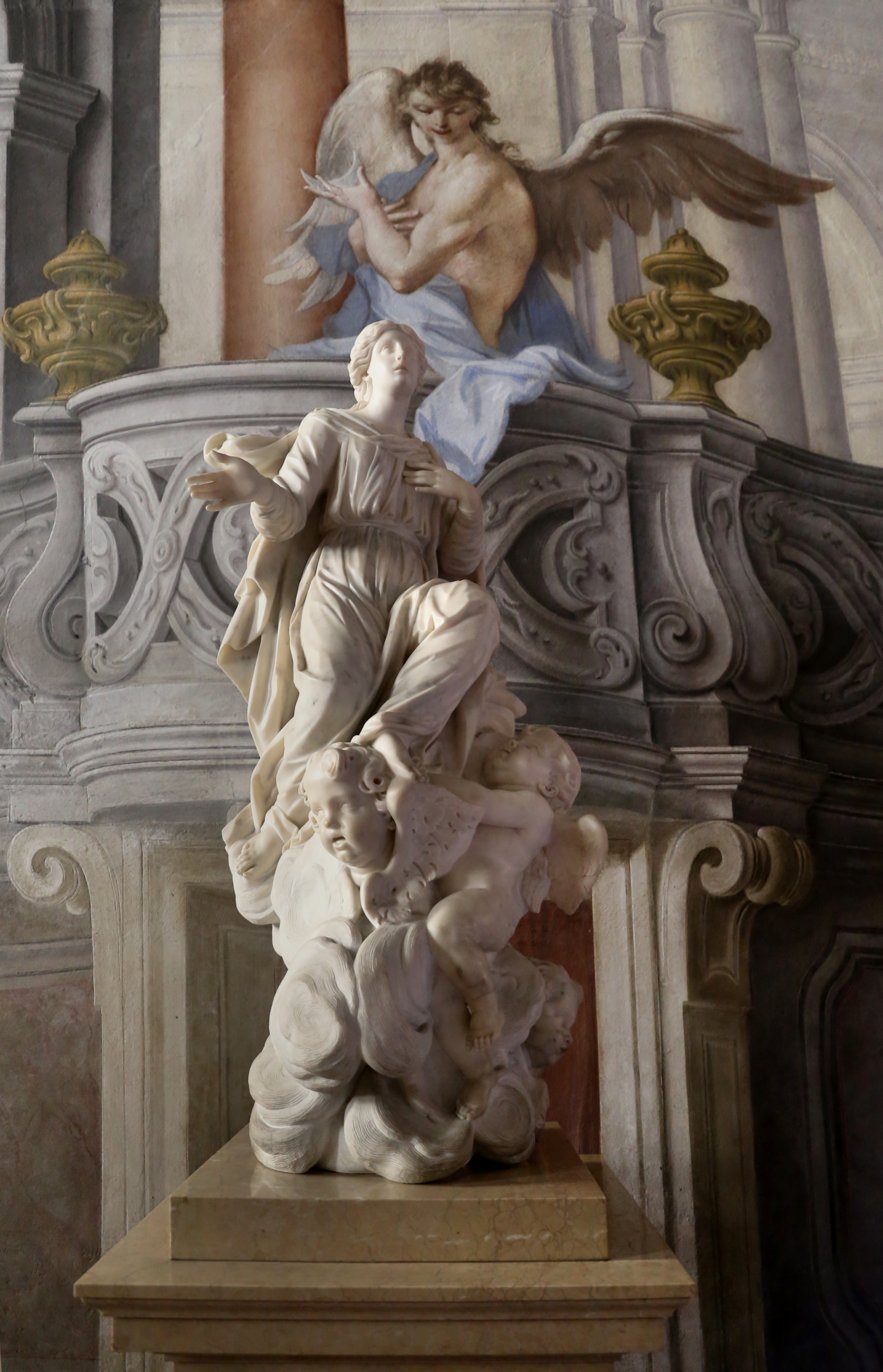
Madonna con angeli, 1690 ca
