= Alexander Alexandrovich Menshikov =

Prince Aleksandr Aleksandrovich Menshikov (1 March 1714 – 27 November 1764) was a son of Prince Menshikov who, at one stage, was betrothed to Grand Duchess Natalya Alexeyevna, a granddaughter of Peter the Great. He later served as an officer in the Russian Imperial Army.

== Life ==
Aleksandr Aleksandrovich Menshikov was the son of Prince Aleksandr Danilovich Menshikov and his wife Darya Mikhailovna Arsenyeva (1682-1728).

With the accession of Catherine, the second wife of Peter the Great, to the Russian throne in 1725, Prince Menshikov was practically the absolute ruler of Russia. Prince Menshikov arranged the betrothal of his elder daughter Princess Maria to the future Tsar Peter II. Prince Menshikov similarly arranged the betrothal of his son to Grand Duchess Natalya Alexeyevna, a granddaughter of Peter the Great. However, following the fall and exile of the Menshikovs in September 1727, the engagement was broken off and the family was stripped of all their positions and property titles and charged with embezzlement and abuse. The family was exiled to the Siberian town of Beryozovo.

After the death of their father in 1729, Aleksandr and his surviving sister, Alexandra, (his sister Maria had died of smallpox while they were in exile) were able to return from exile in 1731 during the reign of Empress Anna Ivanovna. Only part of their personal property was returned such as clothing, linens and tableware including copper and tin. However, the Menshikov jewels were retained by the Empress. The jewels of the family were later used for the crown for the coronation of the Emperor, including diamonds, pearls and emeralds.

In 1731, Aleksandr Menshikov became an ensign in the Guards Preobrazhensky Regiment. He participated in the capture of Ochakov (1737) and Khotin (1739), under the leadership of Count Munnich, and in 1738 became a captain-lieutenant. In 1748 he received the rank of second-major and took part in the Prussian War. In 1757 he was made a Knight of the Order of St. Alexander Nevsky and the given the rank of lieutenant-general.

He married Princess Elizaveta Petrovna Galitzina (1721–1764) and they had four children:

- Peter Aleksandrovich Menshikov (1743–1781) - married Princess Ekaterina Alexandrovna Dolgorukova (1747–1791);
- Sergei Aleksandrovich Menshikov (1746–1815) - Senator, married Princess Ekaterina Nikolaevna Galitzine (1764–1832), father of A.S Menshikov;
- Daria Alexandrovna Menshikova (1747–1817) - married Prince Alexander Bakarovich Gruzinsky (1726–1791);
- Catherine Alexandrovna Menshikova (1748–1791) - married Stepan Stepanovich Zinoviev.

In 1762, he was among the first residents notified of the accession to the throne of the Empress Catherine II. He was then elevated to the rank of General-in-chief. He died two years later.

== Awards ==
- Order of Saint Catherine (2 May 1727) - the only man who was awarded the medal.
- Order of the Black Eagle (2 May 1727)
- Order of St. Andrew (25 May 1727)
- Order of St. Alexander Nevsky (25 May 1727)

After the fall of his father he was deprived of all his ranks and awards.

- Order of St. Alexander Nevsky (30 August 1757)
