= Domenico Parodi =

Italian painter

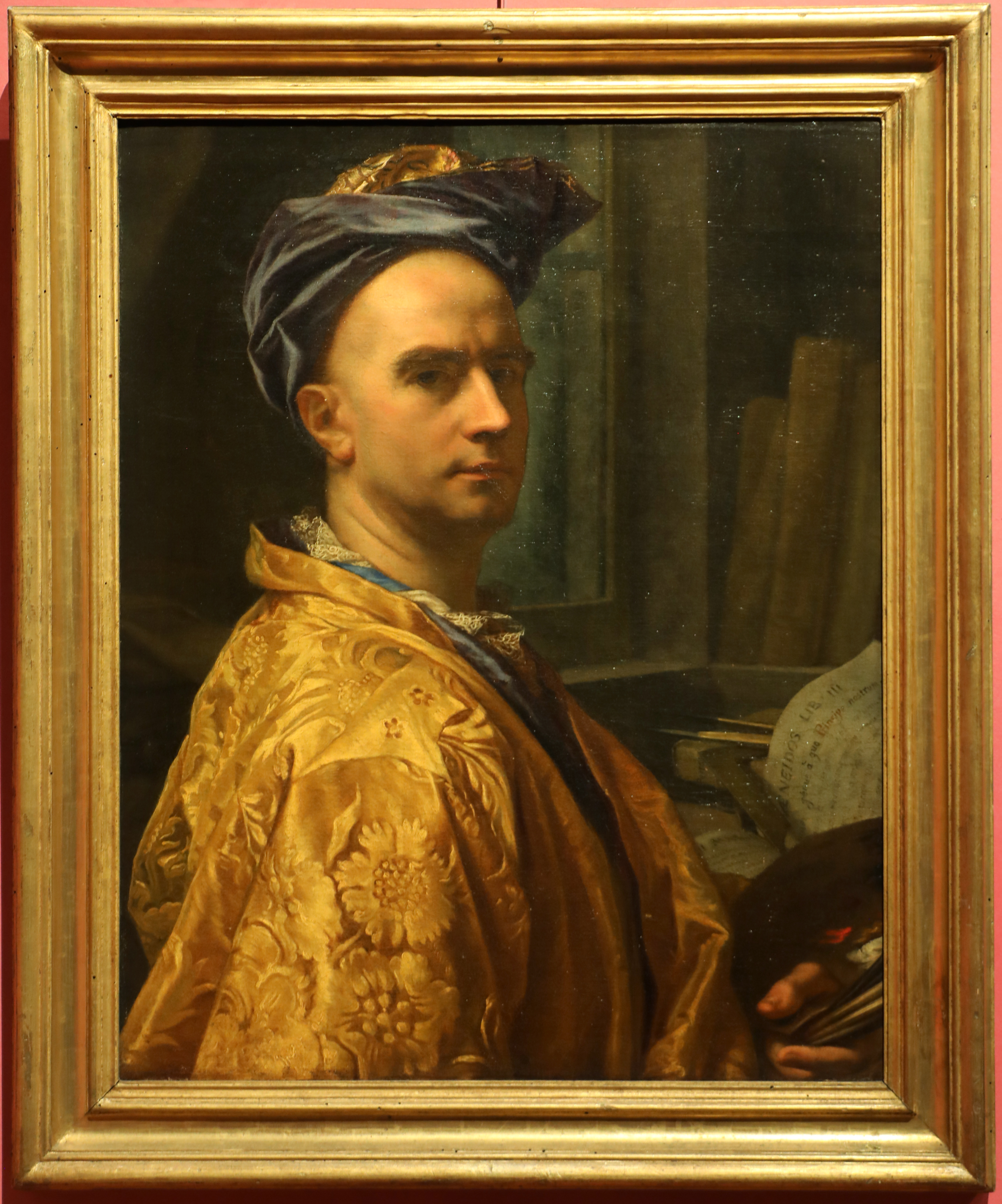
Self-portrait, c. 1700–1710, Florence, Uffizi

Domenico Parodi (1672 – 19 December 1742) was an Italian painter, sculptor, and architect, of the late Baroque. He was the son of the famous Genoese sculptor Filippo Parodi and the elder brother of the Baroque painter Giovanni Battista Parodi (1674–1730)

== Biography ==
Domenico was initially apprenticed in Venice under Sebastiano Bombelli. In the early 1690s, he worked in the studios of Carlo Maratta, and later under Maratta's pupil, Paolo Girolamo Piola. His designs combined elements from Castiglione, the Carracci, Maratta, Cortona, Bernini and Giordano and were in turn important for the compositions of Francesco Campora and Giovanni Agostino Ratti. Among his pupils were Nicolò Malatto, Angiolo Rossi, Batista Parodi (his brother); and son Domenico. Domenico Junior resided in Lisbon, and was a celebrated portrait painter in his day. Another pupil, briefly, was Francesco Campora. He frescoed a hall in the Palazzo Negroni.

Parodi died in Genoa in 1742.

== Bibliography ==
- Soldani, Silvana (1967). "Profilo di Domenico Parodi". Critica d'Arte (in Italian). 14 (87): 60–70.
- Franchini Guelfi, Fausta (1988). "Domenico Parodi e Francesco Biggi". La scultura a Genova e in Liguria dal Seicento al primo Novecento (in Italian). Genoa: Carige. pp. 280–1.
