= 1733 in Russia =

Events from the year 1733 in Russia

== Incumbents ==
- Monarch – Anna

== Event ==
- Peter and Paul Cathedral was completed
- Northern Fleet was founded

== Birth ==
- Boris Kurakin, Russian statesman
- Mikhail Shcherbatov, Russian philosopher
- Ivan Firsov, Russian painter
- Alexander Sergeyevich Stroganov, Russian aristocrat

== Death ==
- Catherine Ivanovna of Russia, Tsarevna of Russia
- Ivan Fyodorov, Russian explorer
