= Maria Menshikova =

Russian noble

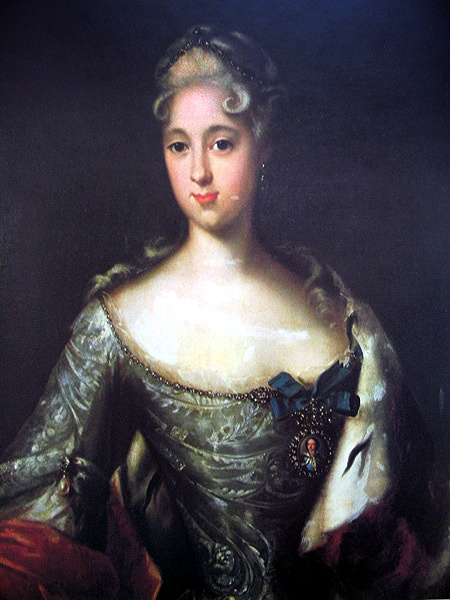
- Princess Maria; portrait by Johann Gottfried Tannauer
- Born: Princess Maria Alexandrovna Menshikova; 26 December 1711; Saint Petersburg
- Died: 26 December 1729 (aged 18); Berezovo
- Noble family: Menshikov
- Father: Alexander Danilovich Menshikov
- Mother: Daria Mikhailovna Arsenieva

Princess Maria Alexandrovna Menshikova (26 December 1711 – 26 December 1729) was a daughter of Aleksandr Danilovich Menshikov, the favourite of Peter I of Russia.

== Life ==
She was the eldest daughter and first child of Prince Aleksandr Danilovich Menshikov and Daria Mikhailovna Arsenieva.

Thanks to her father's influence in the Russian court, she was engaged to Grand Duke Peter of Russia, a grandson of Peter the Great. Though they never married their engagement was announced and a dowry discussed. This proposal brought about the disgrace of her father who was subsequently exiled to Siberia.

== Death ==
After following her father into exile, she died of smallpox in Berezovo at age eighteen.
