= Alexander Danilovich Menshikov =

Russian statesman and general (1673–1729)

His Serene Highness Alexander Menshikov Duke of Ingria
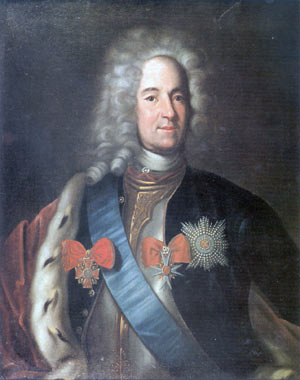
- Portrait, 18th century

Member of the Supreme Privy Council
- In office 1726–1728
- Preceded by: Position established
- Succeeded by: Vasily Lukich Dolgorukov

1st President of the College of War
- In office 1717–1724
- Preceded by: Position established
- Succeeded by: Anikita Repnin

Member of the Governing Senate
- In office 1711–1728
- Preceded by: Position established

1st Governor-General of St. Petersburg
- In office 1703–1724
- Preceded by: Position established
- Succeeded by: Pyotr Apraksin

Personal details
- Born: 16 November 1673 Moscow, Russia
- Died: 23 November 1729 (aged 56) Beryozovo, Russia
- Spouse: Darya Mikhailovna Arsenyeva
- Children: Maria Menshikova; Alexandra Alexandrovna Menshikova; Alexander Alexandrovich Menshikov
- Awards: See list: Titles; Prince of the Russian Empire, Prince of the Holy Roman Empire, 1st Duke of Izhora, 1st Duke of Cosel; Orders; Order of St. Andrew, Order of St. Alexander Nevsky, Order of the Black Eagle, Order of the White Eagle, Order of the Elephant

Military service
- Allegiance: Tsardom of Russia; Russian Empire
- Branch/service: Army of Peter; Imperial Russian Army; Imperial Russian Navy
- Years of service: 1699–1728
- Rank: Generalissimo
- Battles/wars: See list: Streltsy uprising; Russo-Turkish War (1686–1700); Azov campaigns; Great Northern War; Storming of Nöteborg; Battle of Praga; Battle of Kalisz; Battle of Holowczyn; Battle of Lesnaya; Battle of Oposhnya; Battle of Poltava; Surrender at Perevolochna; Siege of Riga; Siege of Stralsund; Battle of Friedrichstadt; Siege of Tönning; Siege of Stettin

Prince Alexander Danilovich Menshikov (Russian: Александр Данилович Меншиков; 16 November [O.S. 6 November] 1673 – 23 November [O.S. 12 November] 1729) was a Russian soldier and statesman. His official titles included generalissimo, prince of the Russian Empire, duke of Izhora, prince of the Holy Roman Empire, and duke of Cosel. Rising from humble origins, he became a highly appreciated associate and friend of Tsar Peter the Great, leading to his rise as a prominent political and military figure in early 18th-century Russia. Following Peter's death, he was the de facto ruler of Russia from 1725 to 1727.

== Early life ==
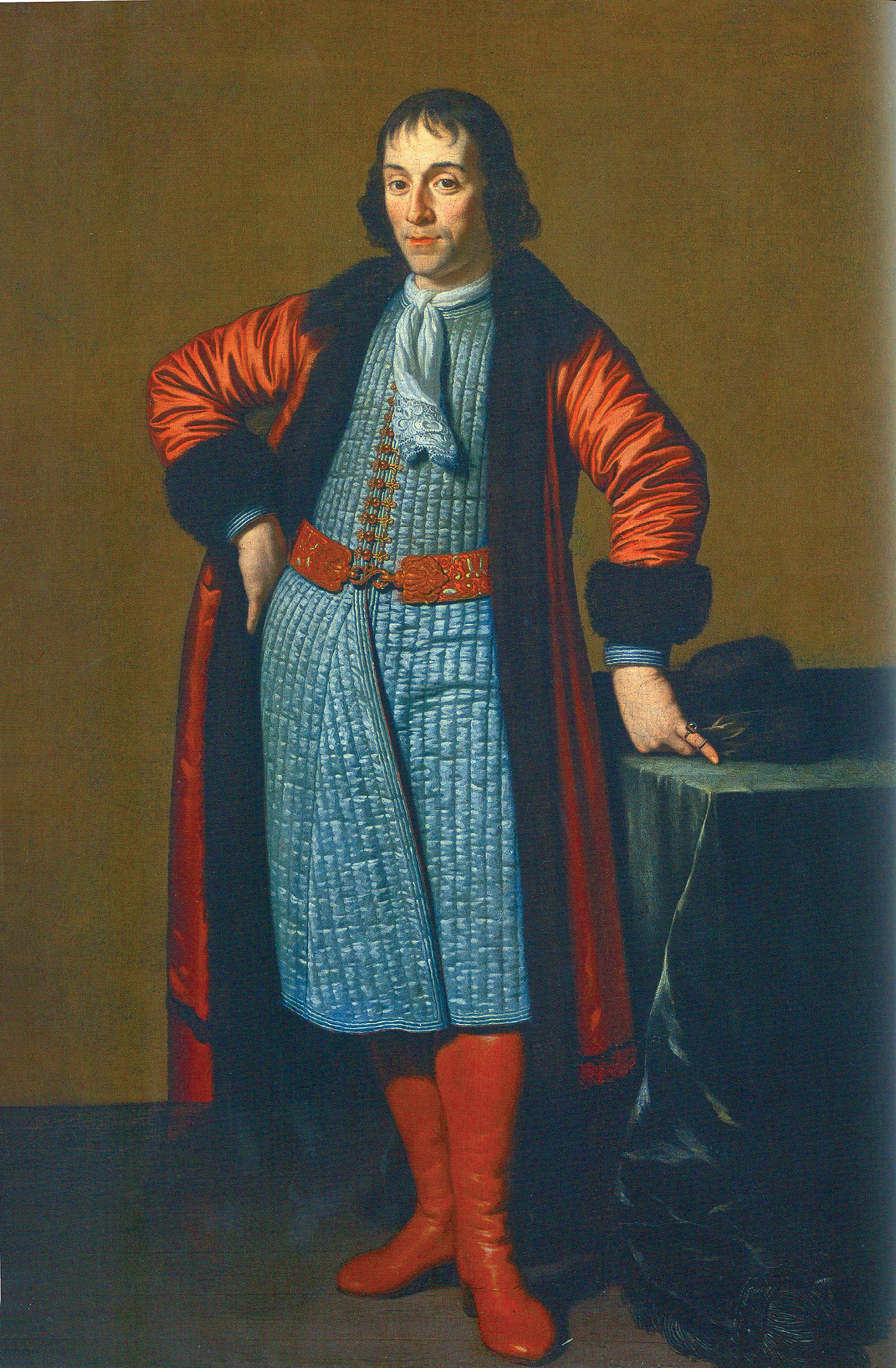
Portrait of Menshikov by Michiel van Musscher (1698)

Menshikov was born on 16 November [O.S. 6 November] 1673 in Moscow. The origins of his youth are not known for certain. Historian Paul Bushkovitch argues that Menshikov was not an aristocrat and was most likely descended from servants of the palace stables, who among others made up the first soldiers of Peter's 'toy armies.' Another legend states that Menshikov was making a living on the streets of Moscow as a vendor of stuffed buns known as pirozhki (pies) at the age of twenty. His fine appearance and witty character caught the attention of Franz Lefort, Peter's first favourite, who took him into his service and finally transferred him to the Tsar. However, Robert K. Massie states it was likely his father was an ex Lithuanian corporal-clark stationed in the Preobrazhenskoye District where his son was noticed and became a soldier in the Tsar's newly formed army units. Whatever his antecedents, Menshikov had not had a thorough education and while he could read, he never learned to write. For the rest of his life, he always wrote through a secretary.

Menshikov took an active part in the Azov campaigns (1695–1696) against the Ottoman Empire. Then, from 1697 to 1698 he accompanied Peter the Great on the Grand Embassy tour of Europe. During the Tsar's first foreign tour in the next year, Menshikov worked by his side in the dockyard of Amsterdam, and acquired a thorough knowledge of shipbuilding and colloquial Dutch and German. As a result of his Dutch shipbuilding education, in 1698, the East India Company issued to Menshikov a shipbuilder's certificate. In 1698, on his return to Russia, Menshikov was one of those required to lead the punishment of those streltsy soldiers captured during the streltsy uprising. During the subsequent executions, he later boasted of having cut off twenty heads.

On the death of Lefort in 1699, Menshikov succeeded him as one of Peter's prime favourites and confidants.

== Rise in rank ==
Menshikov accompanied the Russian forces of the Tsar to besiege the fortress of Nöteborg (renamed Shlisselburg by the Russians), then held by the Swedish forces of Charles XII of Sweden in 1702. In October, Russian forces succeeding in taking the fortress after the Swedish surrendered following a ten-day bombardment. As a reward for his service under the Tsar and Marshall Boris Sheremetev, he was made the first Russian governor the re-christened fortress.

In May 1703, Menshikov participated in the capture of the Swedish fortress of Nyenskans (Nyenschantz), which brought an area of control suitable for the Tsar to establish Saint Petersburg. He also accompanied the Tsar in a force of Guards in some 30 boats in a naval action following the seizure in which two Swedish ships were captured. As a result of this naval action, Menshikov was awarded the Order of St. Andrew. Later in 1703, following the Russian seizure of land along the Neva and the Gulf of Finland he was appointed the first Governor of the newly established Saint Petersburg. It was during this time, that the young Catherine I of Russia had entered Menshikov's household as a servant. There are no confirmed accounts that she was Menshikov's mistress, however she later became the mistress of Tsar Peter and rose through the ranks to eventually become the Tsar's wife and later, despite humble origins, Empress in her own right. In 1705, he was appointed official governor of the teenage Alexei Petrovich, Tsarevich of Russia. Menshikov exercised responsibility for the Tsarevich mostly from afar while on campaign but when meeting in later years, it was said that they did not get on. Alexei also claimed that Menshikov had made him a drunkard and tried to poison the Tsarevich.

In August 1706, he married Darya Mikhailovna, one of his household, who was a companion of Catherine. By October 1706, Menshikov commanded forces of the Tsar at the Battle of Kalisz. As a reward, the Tsar gave him the Russian title Prince of Izhora, along with large estates. In 1706, at the Tsar's request, he was also made a Prince of the Holy Roman Empire. Around 1706 he had a conflict with Andrew Vinius; Vinius lost all of his land and goods to Menshikov as he rose in power.

He acted as subordinate to Boris Sheremetev and Georg Benedikt von Ogilvy during the campaigns before Charles XII in 1708. He commanded the cavalry at the Battle of Grodno and during the subsequent retreat. He subsequently participated in the battle of Holowczyn in July 1708. Following a series of defensive river manoeuvres, Menshikov accompanied the Tsar to intercept the Swedish army of Adam Ludwig Lewenhaupt which resulted in a Russian victory at the Battle of Lesnaya. Menshikov commanded the left wing of the Russian army, some eight regiments of Guards and dismounted dragoons. Later at the sack of Baturyn in November 1708, Menshikov led Russian forces to sack the capital of the Cossack hetman Ivan Mazepa who had decided to support the Swedish invasion of Russia.

In January 1709, Menshikov narrowly escaped captured at Opishnia after Charles XII himself led five cavalry regiments to seize control of a river crossing where Menshikov and his forces were resting and having dinner. Menshikov led the Russian defences of the region during early 1709, with his headquarters at the village of Krutoy Bereg on the Vorskla river. The Tsar arrived in June 1709 to renew offensive actions with Menshikov, resulting in the crowning victory of Poltava (8 July [O.S. 27 June] 1709) where Menshikov won his field-marshal's baton. At the battle of Poltava, he initially commanded the vanguard of the Russian army, with dragoons at a series of fortified redoubts, before commanding the entire left flank of the Russian forces. After the battle, as the surviving Swedish forces retreated, Menshikov and some 6,000 Russian soldiers pursued them over several days. This led to the subsequent Surrender at Perevolochna in which Menshikov, who had only a third of the number of soldiers of the Swedish forces opposite him, offered terms to the surviving army under Lewenhaupt. As King Charles XII had managed to escape, Lewenhaupt surrendered to Menshikov, resulting in the complete destruction and imprisonment of the remaining Swedish forces outside greater Sweden, which further contributed towards the Russian victory in the Great Northern War.

== Later life and corruption ==
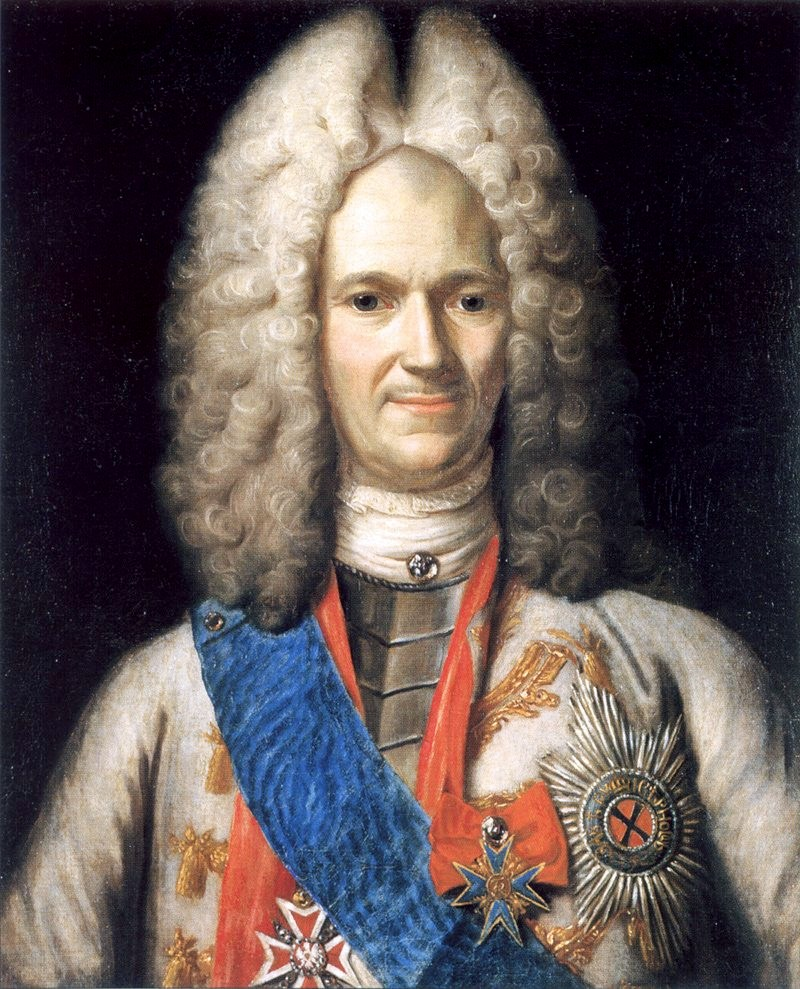
Portrait of Menshikov; c. 1716 to 1720

From 1709 to 1714 he served during the Courland, Holstein and Pomeranian campaigns, but then, as governor-general of Ingria, with almost unlimited powers, was entrusted with a leading part in the civil administration. Menshikov understood perfectly the principles on which Peter's reforms were conducted and was the right hand of the Tsar in all his gigantic undertakings. But he abused his powerful position, and his corrupt practices frequently brought him to the verge of ruin, although he survived because Tsar Peter repeatedly forgave his corruption. Every time the Tsar returned to Russia he received fresh accusations of plunder against "his Serene Highness." Peter's first serious outburst of indignation (March 1711) was due to the prince's looting in Poland. Peter threatened him with execution and Menshikov apologised, which was accepted by the Tsar.

In an effort to force Charles XII to conclude a formal peace treaty in the years following Poltava, Menshikov led the Russian army in an invasion of Swedish Pomerania in 1711 leading to the so-named Siege of Stralsund. This involved the initial ineffective failed siege of the city of Stettin in the Baltic, though Russian forces under Menshikov would succeed in its capture with Saxon army assistance in September 1713.

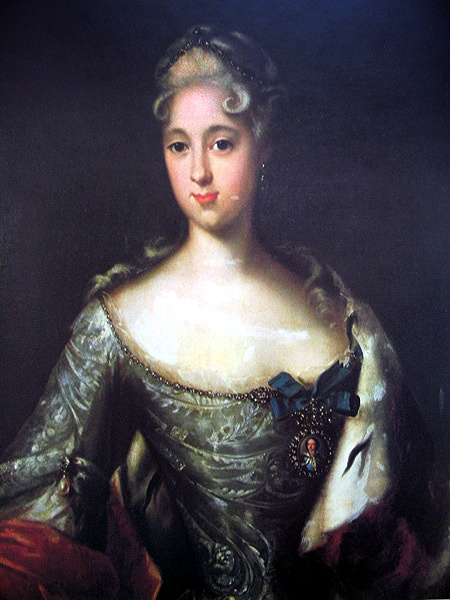
Menshikov's eldest daughter, Princess Maria who was engaged to the future Peter II of Russia but followed her father into exile. Portrait by Johann Gottfried Tannauer

On his return to Russia in 1712, Peter discovered that Menshikov had turned a blind eye to wholesale corruption in his own governor-generalship. Peter warned him "for the last time" to change his ways. By 1713, he was implicated in corruption again in the "Solovey process", in the course of which it was demonstrated that he had defrauded the government of 100,000 roubles. He only owed his life on this occasion to a sudden illness. On his recovery Peter's fondness for his friend overcame his sense of justice. Returning to command Russian forces, his allied coalition succeeded in the Siege of Tönning in May 1713.

In 1714 he was elected a Fellow of the Royal Society. According to Simon Sebag Montefiore in his book The Romanovs 1613–1918 Menshikov was once punched twice by Tsar Peter the Great, once in the nose and once on the side of the head, after Tsar Peter saw Menshikov dancing with his sword still on, which was considered to rude manners. Menshikov was accused of fraud and financial dishonesty along with several other notables in 1715. As a result of his rise from humber origins, gathering of huge wealth and favouritism by the Tsar, exaggerated claims were made against Menshikov by some aristocrats, include Yakov Fyodorovich Dolgorukov. An investigation revealed some instances of irregularity but Menshikov was able to moderate the claims and persuade the Tsar that he was acting in the best interests of the state, citing instances of lending money to government and hosting events at his palaces. Tsar Peter fined Menshikov but forgave him.

In 1718, Menshikov was responsible for the arrest of those who helped Alexei Petrovich, Tsarevich of Russia escape Russia before he was forcibly returned. The Tsarevich died following torture and Menshikov then swore an oath of allegiance to Peter Petrovich, Tsarevich of Russia as Peter's new heir, however Peter Petrovich died before taking the throne. In the last year of Peter's reign new allegations of fraud by Menshikov came to light, and he was obliged to appeal for protection to the empress Catherine. Initially sentenced to lose all property and title, Menshikov was again forgiven and restored to all his properties and titles by the Tsar as the Tsar lay ill in his final days.

It was chiefly through the efforts of Menshikov and his colleague Tolstoi that, on the death of Peter, in 1725, Catherine was raised to the throne. Menshikov was committed to the Petrine system, and he recognised that, if that system were to continue, Catherine was, at that particular time, the only possible candidate as a member of the new Russia. Her placement on the throne meant a final victory over ancient prejudices, a vindication of the new ideas of progress, and not least security for Menshikov and his ill-gotten fortune.

== Supremacy, exile and death ==
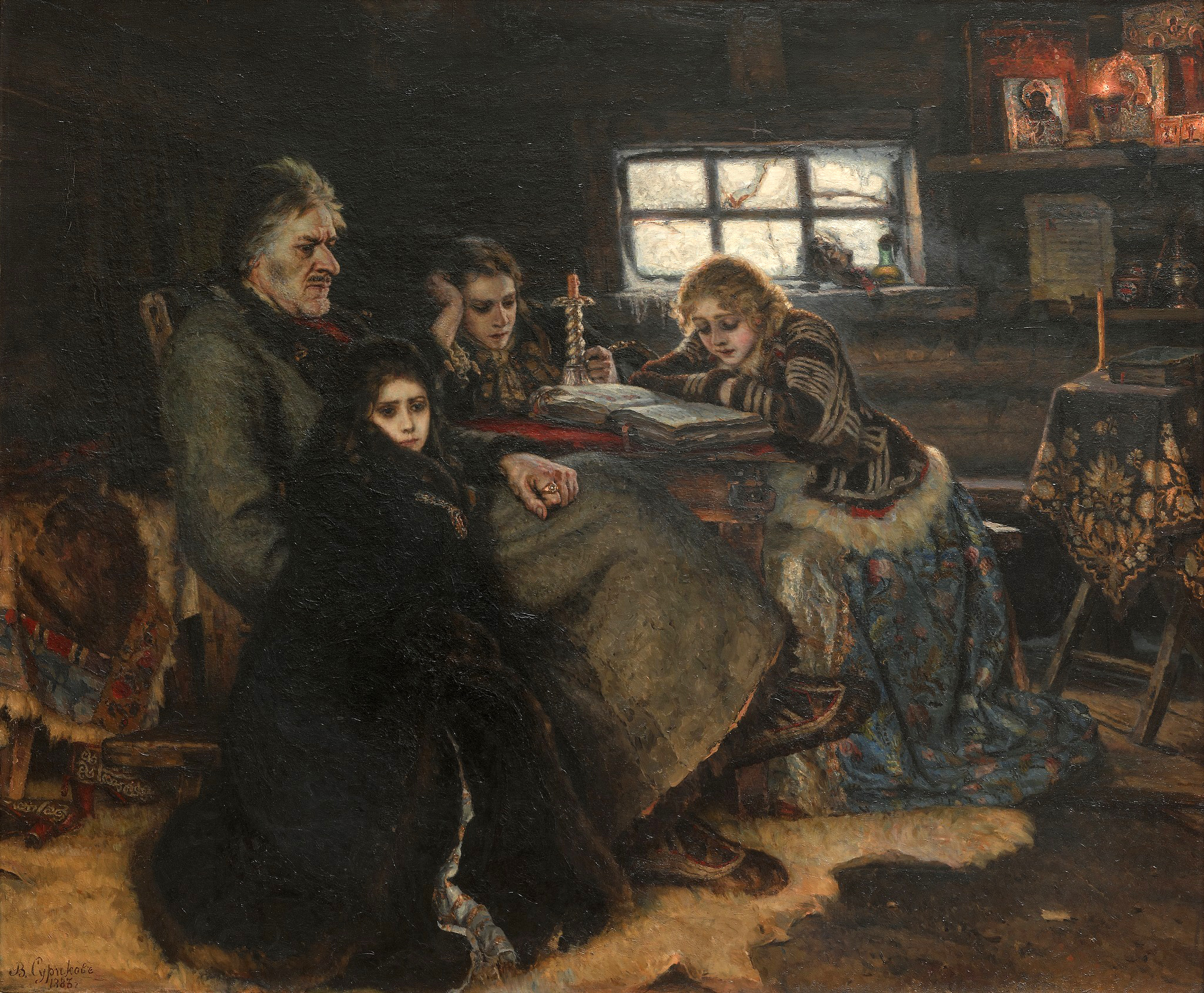
Menshikov with his children in exile; by Vasily Surikov.

During Catherine's short reign (February 1725 – May 1727), Menshikov was practically the de facto absolute ruler of Russia. He reduced the influence of the Governing Senate and concentrated power in a new Supreme Privy council. He promoted himself to the unprecedented rank of Generalissimo. In order to strengthen his and Catherine's position he reduced taxes across Russia by one third for each 'soul'. In 1726, he exiled an earlier rival General Anton de Vieira to Siberia. De Vieira was his brother law, having married Menshikov's sister despite Menshikov opposing the relationship. Following Catherine's death, while his colleague Peter Tolstoi would have raised Elizabeth Petrovna to the throne, Menshikov set up the youthful Peter II, son of Tsarevich Alexei, with himself as dictator during the prince's minority.

He now aimed at establishing himself definitely by marrying his daughter Maria to Peter II. While an engagement was announced, he was soon thwarted by opposition forces. But the old nobility, represented by the Dolgorukovs and the Galitzines, united to overthrow him, and after falling ill, he was deprived of all his dignities and offices and expelled from the capital (20 September [O.S. 9 September] 1727). Subsequently, he was deprived of his enormous wealth, stripped of the titles, and he and his whole family were banished to Beryozovo in Siberia where he died on 23 November [O.S. 12 November] 1729. His wife Darya Mikhailovna (born Arseneva) died on their way into exile in 1728 near Kazan. His daughter Maria also died in 1729 in exile. Menshikov's younger children survived the exile and were eventually returned to the court.

== Palaces ==
Menshikov was given most of Vasilyevsky Island as a present by Tsar Peter and subsequently had his palace built between 1710 and 1713. The palace was much used by Peter as the primary entertaining venue of the Russian state (as Peter preferred his smaller Summer Palace until Peterhof Palace was built). Menshikov Palace had a private church, where Menshikov would host the marriage of Tsar Peter and Catherine I.

In 1711, Menshikov also ordered the construction of a large residence outside St Petersburg, which would become Oranienbaum, one of the great country houses of 18th century Russia. An oval-shaped palace, three stories high it overlooked the river and influenced Peter's nearby palace of Peterhof.

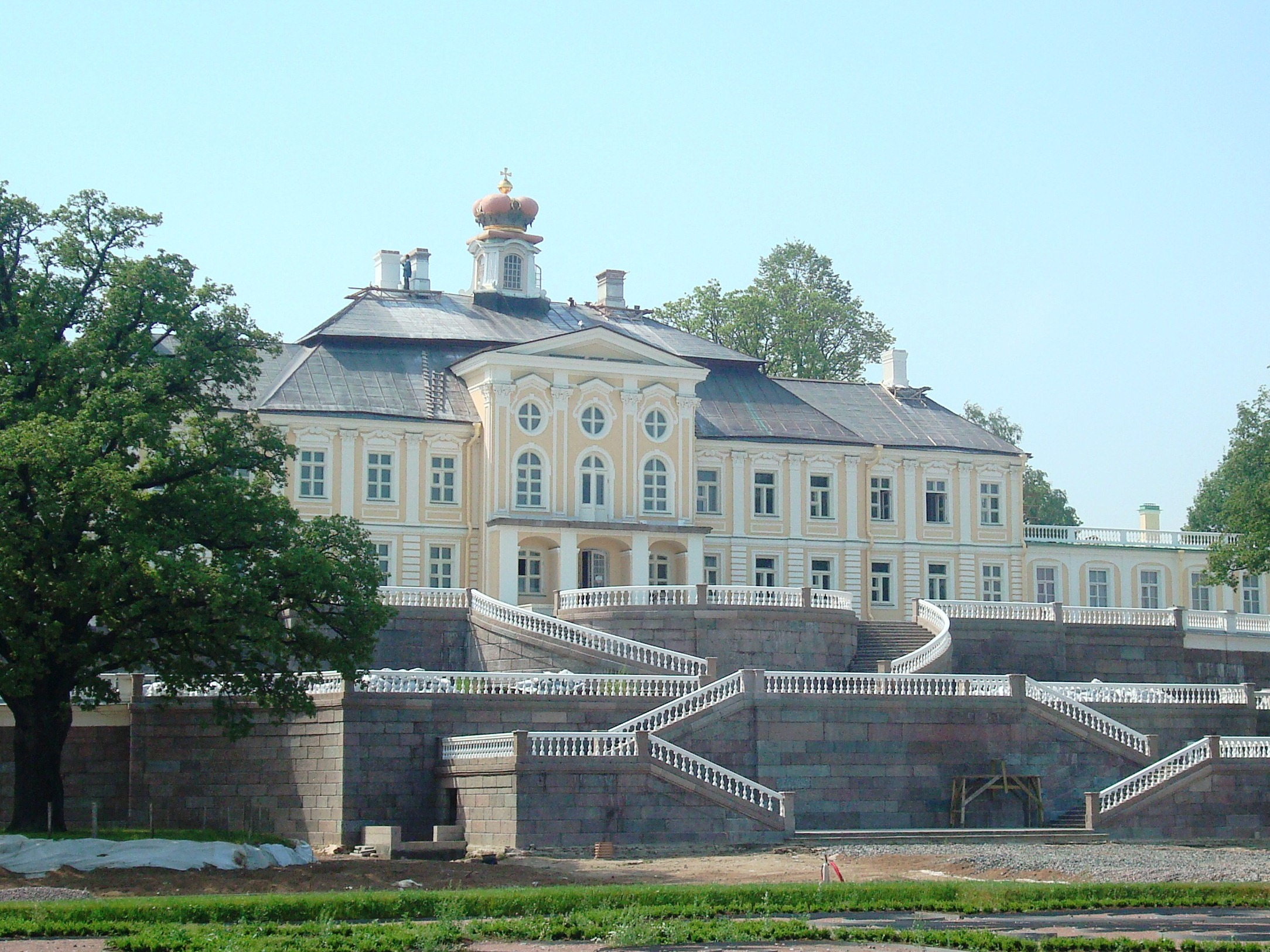
Oranienbaum, Lomonosov

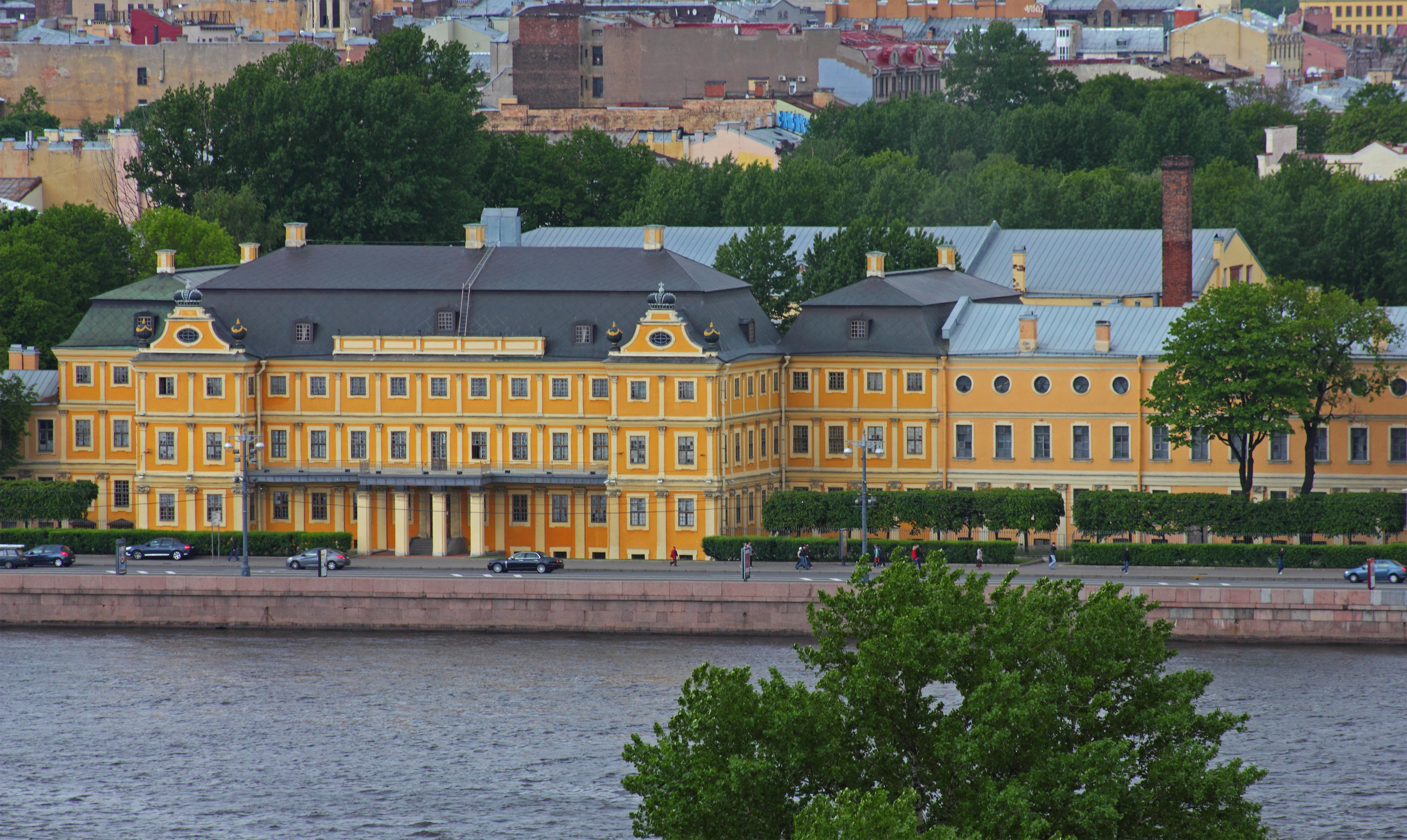
Menshikov Palace, St. Petersburg

== Children ==
1. Princess Maria Alexandrovna (26 December 1711 – 1729) engaged to Grand Duke Peter of Russia and died of smallpox in exile.
2. Princess Alexandra Alexandrovna (17 December 1712 – 13 September 1736) married Gustav von Biron, brother of Ernst Johann von Biron, and died in childbirth.
3. Prince Alexander Alexandrovich, Duke of Ingria (March 1714 – 27 November 1764) engaged to Grand Duchess Natalia Alexeyevna but eventually married Princess Yelizaveta Petrovna Golitsyna and had issue.

== See also ==
- Alexander Sergeyevich Menshikov – his great-grandson.

== Bibliography ==
- "Меншиков, Александр Данилович" . Brockhaus and Efron Encyclopedic Dictionary (in Russian). 1906.
- Anisimov, E. V. (2023). "МЕНШИКОВ АЛЕКСАНДР ДАНИЛОВИЧ". Great Russian Encyclopedia. Electronic version.
- Massie, Robert K. (12 May 2022). Peter the Great. Apollo. ISBN 978-1-80110-277-3.
