= Johann Gottfried Tannauer =

German painter, portraitist and miniaturist (1680–1733–37)

- Born: 1680; Electorate of Saxony, Holy Roman Empire
- Died: c. 1733–1737; Saint Petersburg, Russian Empire
- Known for: Portraits; miniatures; historical painting
- Notable work: Peter I at the Battle of Poltava, Peter I on his deathbed
- Movement: Baroque
- Patron: Peter the Great

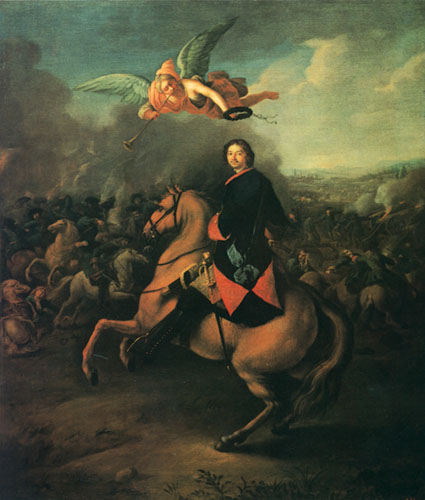
Tsar Peter I at the Battle of Poltava.

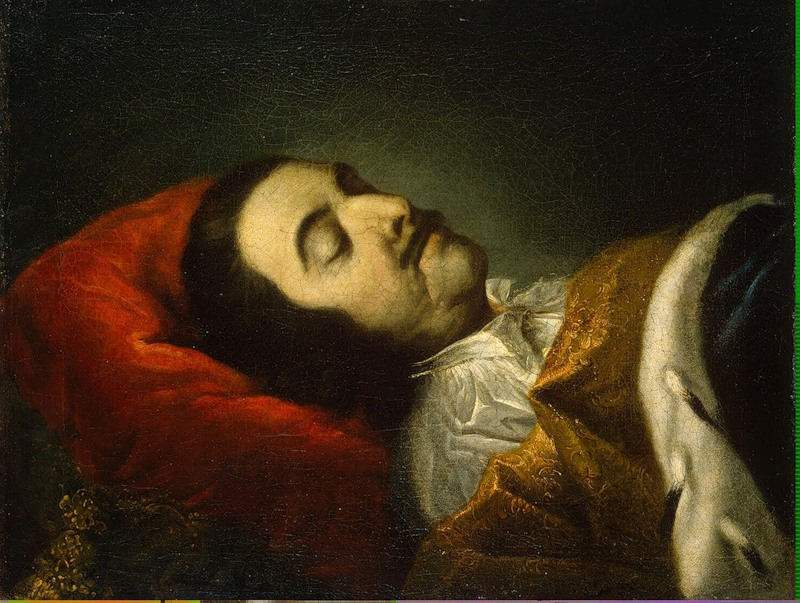
The Tsar on his deathbed

Johann Gottfried Tannauer, or Dannhauer (1680–1733–37) was a German painter, portraitist and miniaturist who worked in Russia after 1711.

== Early life ==
He was born in 1680 in Saxony.

== Career ==
He began as a watchmaker in Swabia, then studied music, but finally turned to painting and worked with Sebastiano Bombelli in Venice. After that, he visited Holland, where he copied the works of Rubens and decided to specialize in portraits.

While working in Karlsbad, he was recommended to Tsar Peter I by the Czech painter, Jan Kupecký. In 1710, he won an appointment as court painter and, after arriving in Smolensk, accompanied the Tsar on his travels during the Pruth River Campaign. This turned out badly for the Tsar and Tannauer, who lost all of his painting equipment.

Upon settling in Saint Petersburg, he painted portraits of most of the members of the Royal Court, including Alexei Petrovich, Tsarevich of Russia, and other distinguished persons, such as Count Pyotr Andreyevich Tolstoy and Admiral Fyodor Apraksin. He also did historical paintings and repaired watches as a hobby. Among his many portraits of the Tsar, the best-known are those showing him at the Battle of Poltava (which was used for a postage stamp in 2009) and on his deathbed. He also worked as a teacher during his tenure as court painter. Among those who studied with him, at least briefly, were Ivan Nikitin and Pyotr Yeropkin.

After Peter's death, Tannauer remained in Russia until 1727, when he decided to go back to Germany. He made it only as far as Poland, then had a stroke. He returned to Saint Petersburg and died there sometime between 1733 and 1737.
