= San Luca, Genoa =

Church in Genoa, Italy

Coordinates: 44°24′38″N 8°55′49″E

Church of San Luca
- Chiesa di San Luca
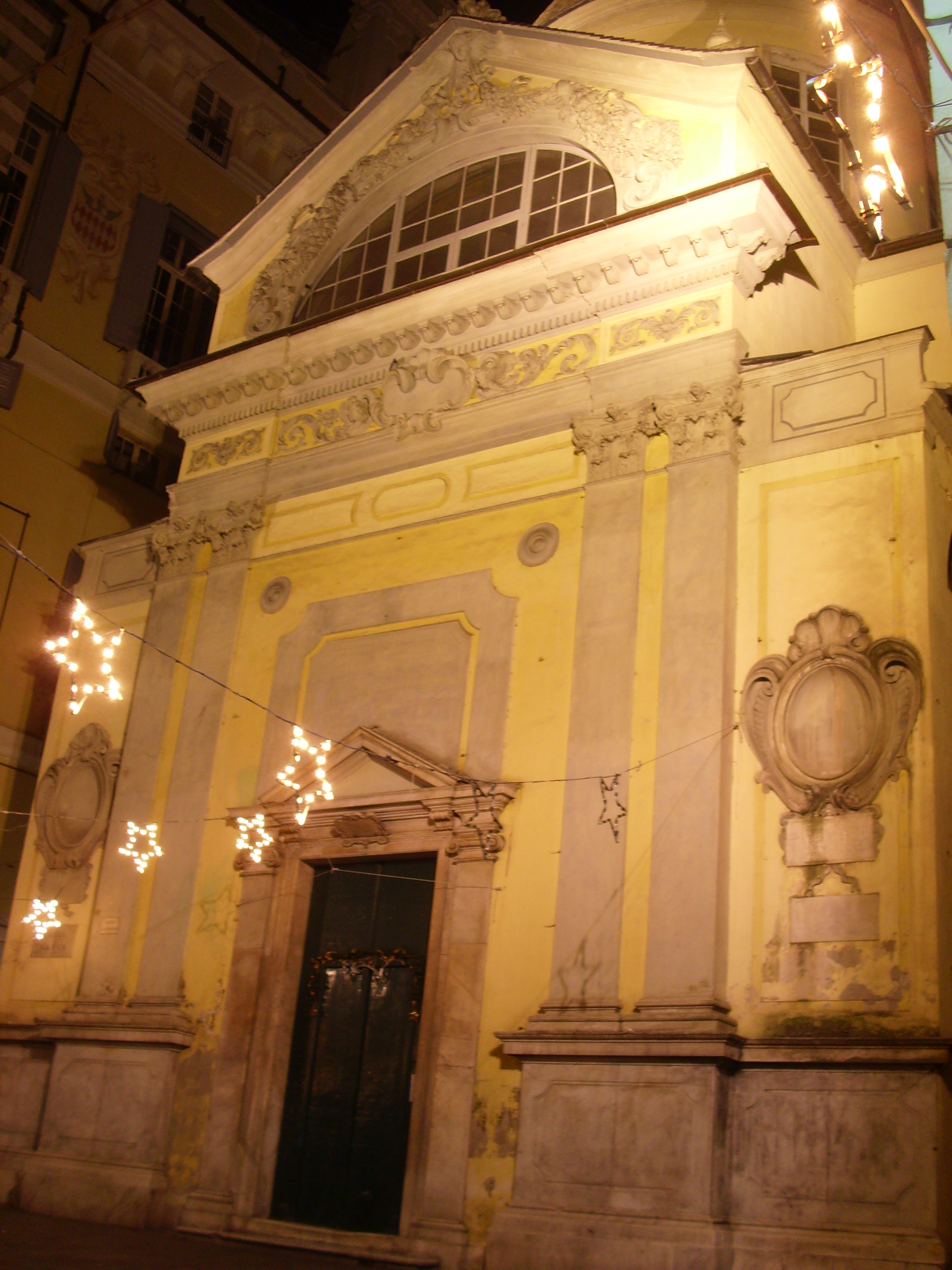
- Façade of the church
- Church of San Luca
- Location: Piazza San Luca 1, Maddalena, Genoa, Liguria, Italy
- Country: Italy
- Denomination: Roman Catholic

History
- Status: Parish church
- Founded: 1188
- Dedication: Luke the Evangelist
- Consecrated: 1627

Architecture
- Functional status: Active
- Architectural type: Church
- Style: Baroque
- Completed: 1650

Administration
- Archdiocese: Archdiocese of Genoa

The Church of San Luca (Chiesa di San Luca) is a Roman Catholic church in the historic centre of Genoa, Liguria, Italy. It was founded in 1188 by Oberto Spinola and rebuilt between 1626 and 1650 in the Baroque style, to designs now attributed to Bartolomeo Bianco. The church is notable for interior decorations by Domenico Piola, Filippo Parodi, and Giovanni Benedetto Castiglione. It remains a parish church and is owned by the Spinola Foundation.
