= Maddalena (Genoa) =

- Quartiere
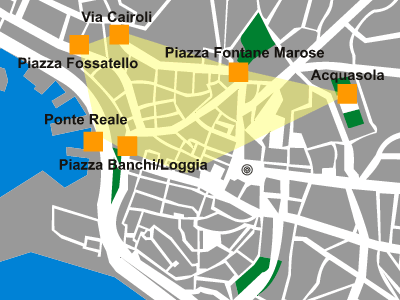
- Map of Maddalena

- Location in Italy
- Coordinates: 44°24′40″N 8°55′50″E
- Country: Italy
- Region: Liguria
- Province: Province of Genoa
- Comune: Genoa

Area
  - Total: 0.27 km^{2} (0.10 sq mi)

Population
  - Total: 5,572
- Postal codes: 16123, 16124
- Area code: 010

Maddalena (Ligurian: Madænn-a) is a neighbourhood in the old town of the Italian city of Genoa. It was one of the six sestieri of ancient Genoa. At present it is part of Municipio I (Centro Est) of Great Genoa.

Located close to the old harbour it had been for many centuries the seat of the economical power of the city.

== Etymology ==
Maddalena takes its name from the church of Saint Mary Magdalene, documented since the 12th century.

== Demographics ==
On 31 December 2015 there were 5,572 people living in Maddalena, with a population density of 20,637 people per km^{2}.

== Geography ==
The neighbourhood is located in the old town of Genoa, between Prè and Molo, in the semi-plain area immediately behind the harbour delimited by piazza Banchi at south-east and via Lomellini at north-west. A characteristic feature of this neighbourhood is the dense grid of alleys close via della Maddalena and via San Luca, upstream of which is via Garibaldi, the 16th-century "strada Nuova" ("new street"), with the luxurious palaces of the oligarchic families of the Republic of Genoa; the seafront of the neighbourhood is piazza Caricamento, in front of the old harbour.

== History ==
Settlement is first recorded in the 10th century when some houses were built in the rural area outside the walls around the churches of San Siro, the first cathedral of Genoa, and Santa Maria delle Vigne. The city incorporated these settlements in the 12th century with the "burgus" (current Maddalena) were included within the new "Barbarossa walls".

The old noble families had an important role in Maddalena's early development, with their feuds meaning they needed private citadels in the alleys, each with a palace, a central square and sometimes a noble church, such as Spinola in San Luca and Calvi-Pallavicini in San Pancrazio. Alongside the feudal families, since the 13th century grew the importance of Arts and Crafts Associations, that give the names to some streets in the old town: today again many streets where craftsmen and tradesmen had their workshops are named after them, as a reference via degli Orefici (goldsmiths), piazza di Pellicceria (furriers), via dei Macelli di Soziglia (butchers) and vico dei Droghieri (grocers).

In the 16th century upstream the neighborhood a luxurious residential settlement have been built. Along the "Strada Nuova" (now Via Garibaldi), opened close to the city walls, at the foot of the hill Castelletto where six of the most important Genoese families of that era (Doria, Grimaldi, Lomellini, Lercari, Pallavicini and Spinola) built their palaces.

The neighbourhood had long the economical centre of the city, and its role was strengthened in the 19th century, when the 16th-century "Loggia of the Merchants" became the seat of the stock exchange. However at the beginning of the 20th century the business centre of Genoa moved to De Ferrari Square and a period of decline began for the whole old town. During World War II many buildings were severely damaged by bombings. After the war the lower-class district on the neighbourhood was populated by petty criminals and later by criminal organizations who made the neighbourhood the main prostitution centre in Genoa, causing the abandonment by most of the original inhabitants and the consequent degradation of the buildings. During the first decade of the 21st century restructuring programs took place, and after many years of decline also these areas of the neighbourhood are showing signs of recovery.

During Genoa Expo '92 exhibition the area of the old harbour was redeveloped by Renzo Piano, making it suitable for public access and the Aquarium, the largest one in Italy, designed by Piano himself together with Peter Chermayeff, was opened.

== Architecture ==
=== The strade nuove ===
The strade nuove (new streets) cut their way across the whole neighbourhood above the alleys of the old town. They were opened between the 16th and 18th centuries to create a new upper-class residential district.

Along Strada Nuova (now Garibaldi street) and Strada Nuovissima ("very new street", now Cairoli street) the most important Genoese families built their palaces, among the most luxurious of the whole city.

Due to the slope of the land, the "upstream" palaces were built at different levels, typically with a marble staircase that from the entrance hall leads to a raised courtyard, generally surrounded by columns, from which other staircases reach the upper floors and the rear gardens.

- Via Garibaldi, Strada Nuova par excellence (this was officially its name until 1882), designed by Bernardino Cantone, was built between 1550 and 1588. It is 250 meters long and 7.5 meters wide. It was named after Giuseppe Garibaldi in 1882, soon after his death. Along this streets thirteen luxurious palaces overlook, and twelve of these are inscribed in the UNESCO list of World Heritage Site. Among them Palazzo Doria Tursi, now seat of the municipality of Genoa, Palazzo Bianco and Palazzo Rosso, which host an important art museum. The street had international fame also thanks to the painter Peter Paul Rubens who drew many of these buildings in the book Palazzi di Genova, published in Antwerp in 1622.
- Via Cairoli ("Strada Nuovissima"), designed by Gregorio Petondi was opened in 1786 as a continuation to the west of "Strada Nuova". The road is curved and ends in Largo della Zecca, where it joins the 17th-century "Strada Balbi" through the short via Bensa and Piazza della Nunziata. The street is now named after Cairoli brothers, patriots and politician in the 19th century.
- Piazza della Meridiana joins "Strada Nuova" and "Strada Nuovissima" and takes its name by the 18th century Gerolamo Grimaldi Palace, known as "Meridiana Palace", due to the sundial (in Italian Meridiana) painted on its façade.
- Piazza delle Fontane Marose, at the eastern end of via Garibaldi, takes its name by a monumental fountain, no longer existing, called fons marosus for its raging waters. On the square there are several historic buildings, which are also inscribed in the UNESCO list of World Heritage Site.
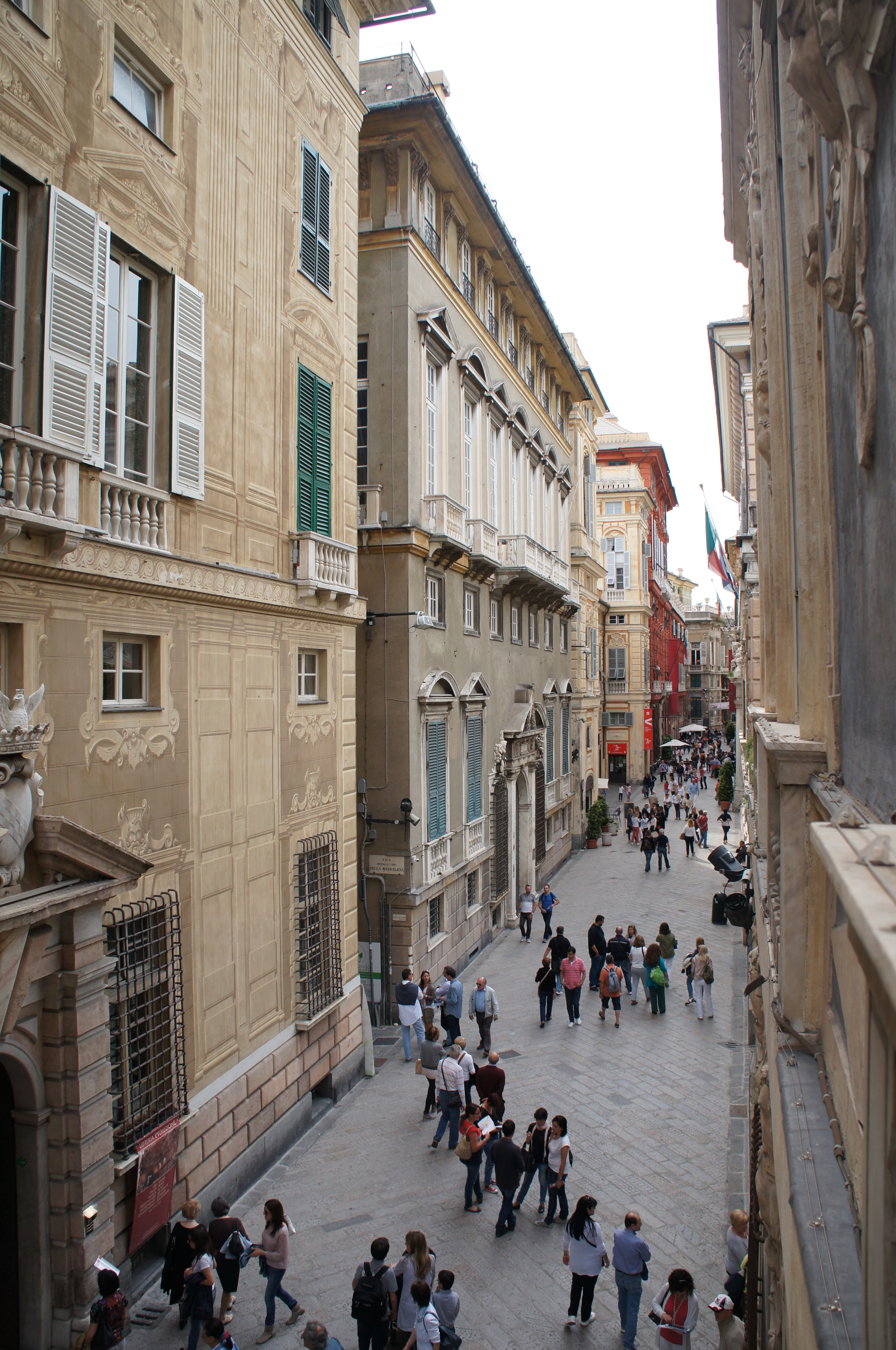
Via Garibaldi

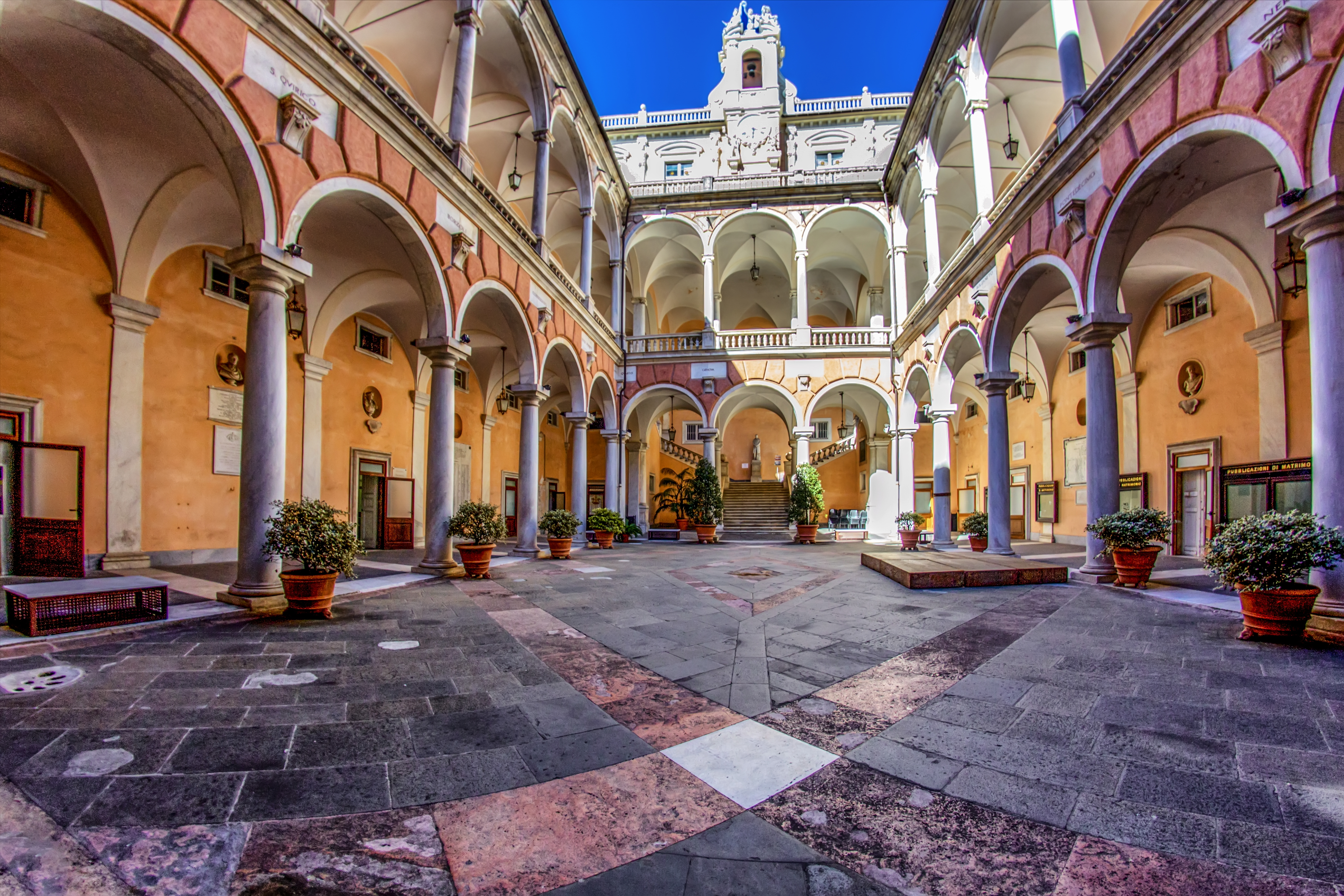
Palazzo Doria Tursi, internal courtyard

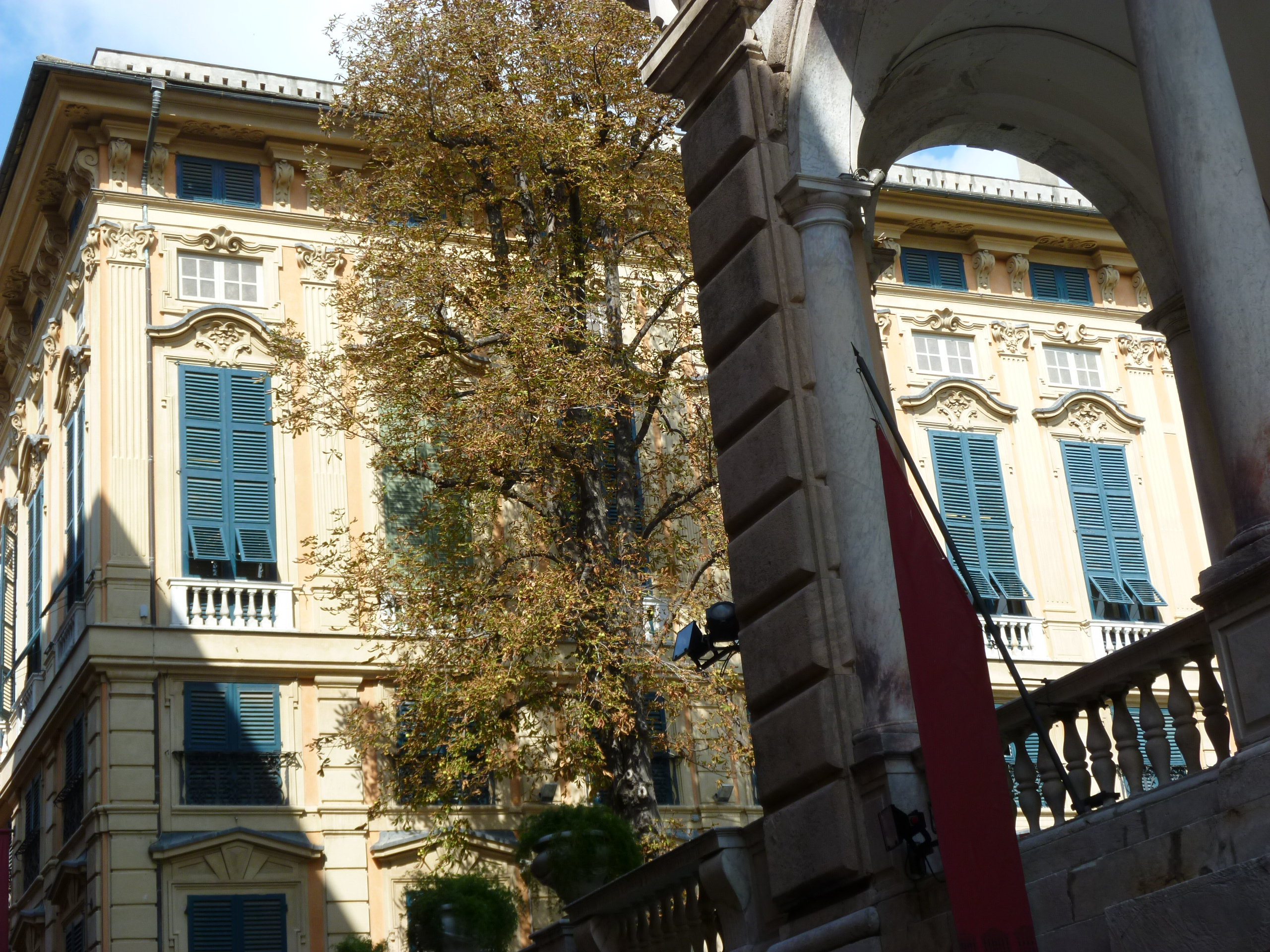
Palazzo Bianco

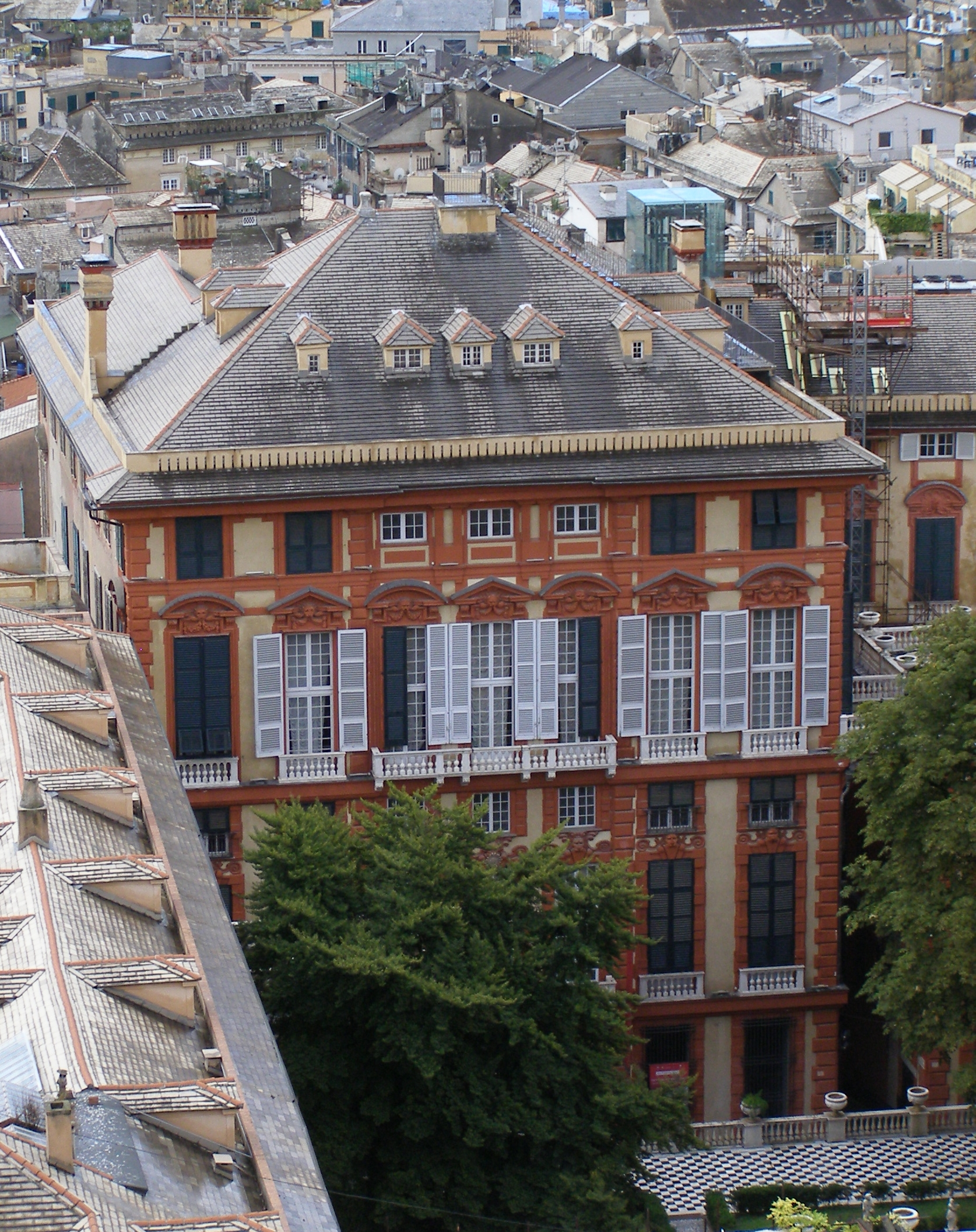
Palazzo Rosso

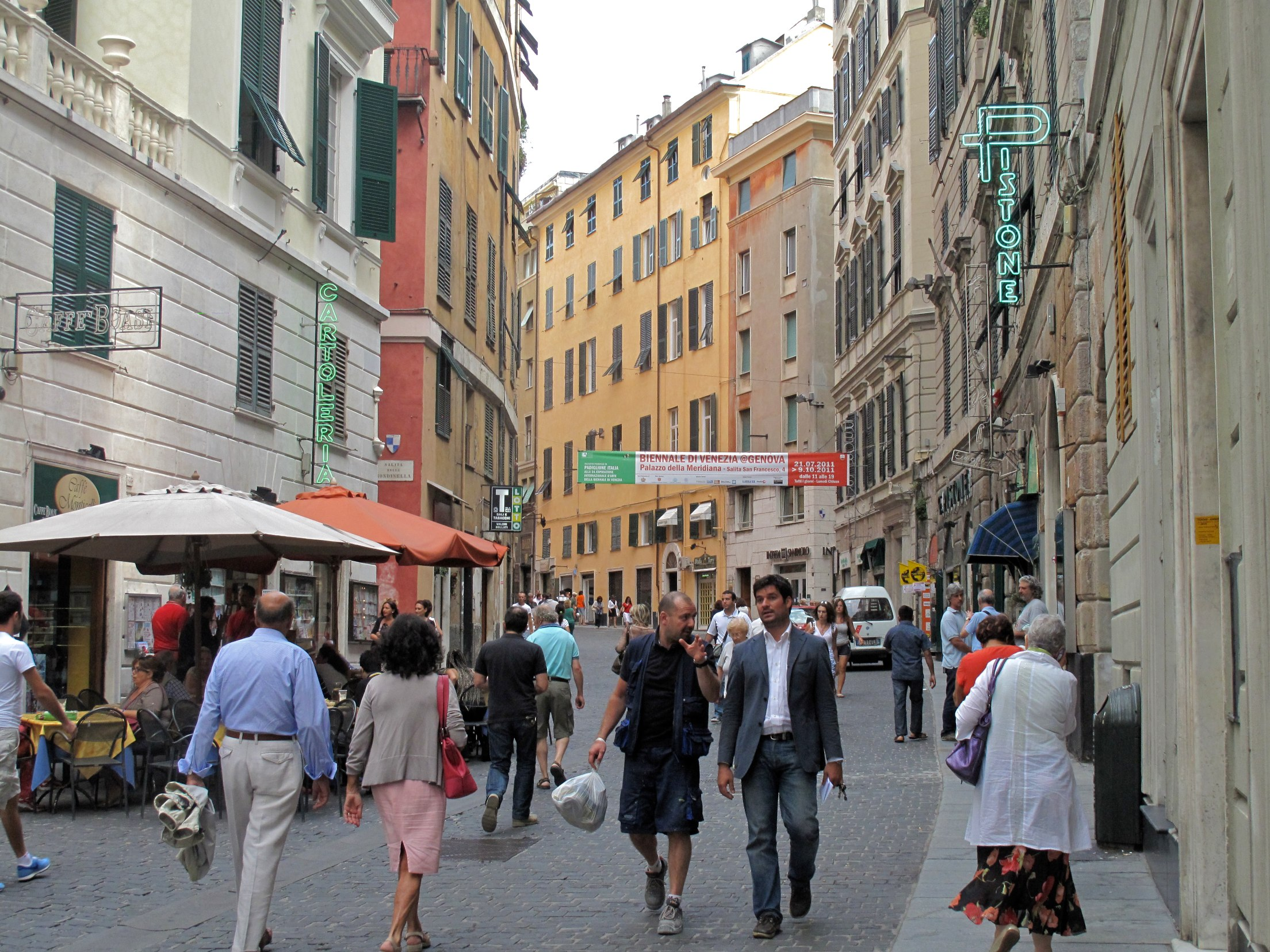
Via Cairoli

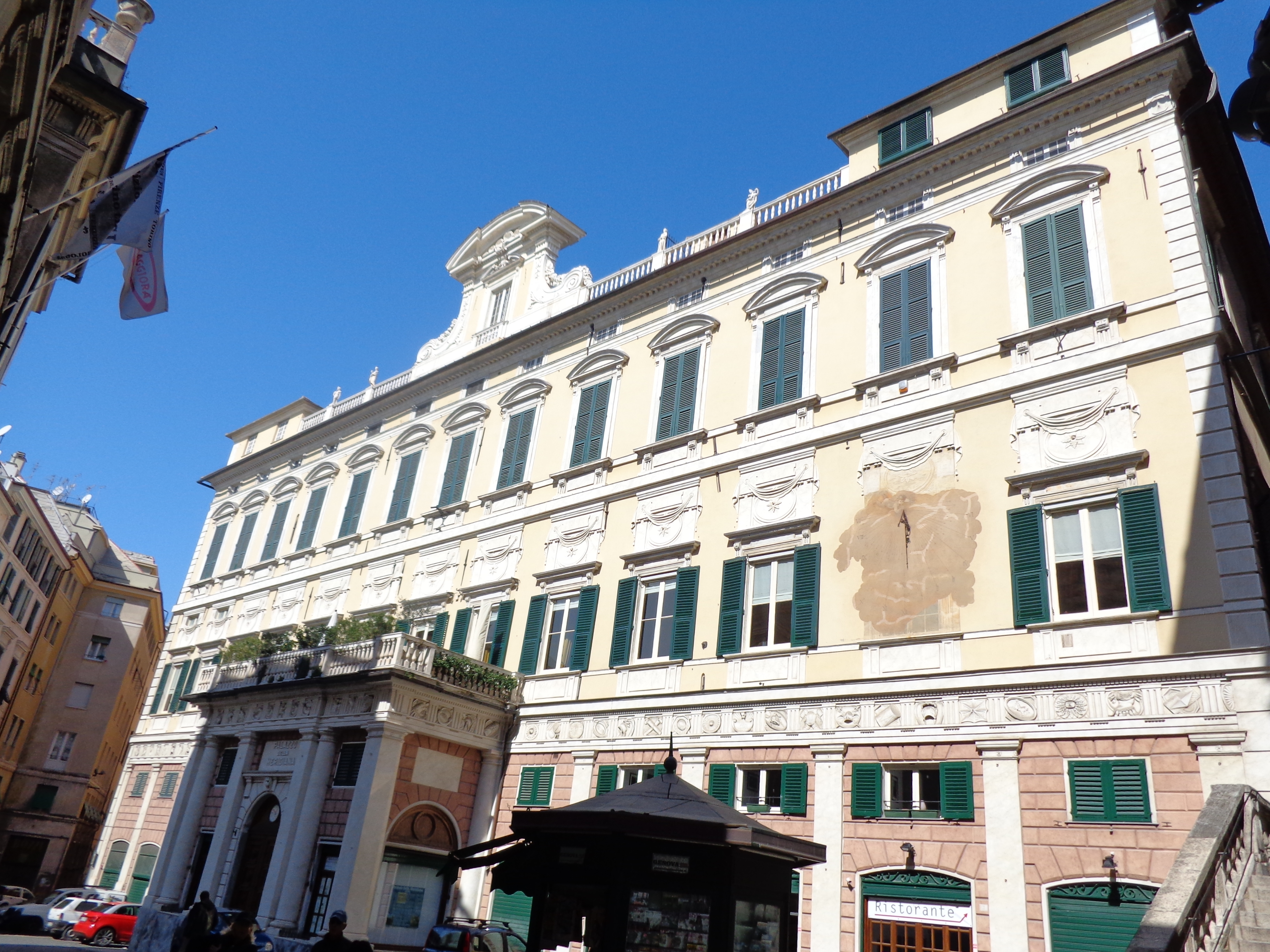
Palazzo della Meridiana

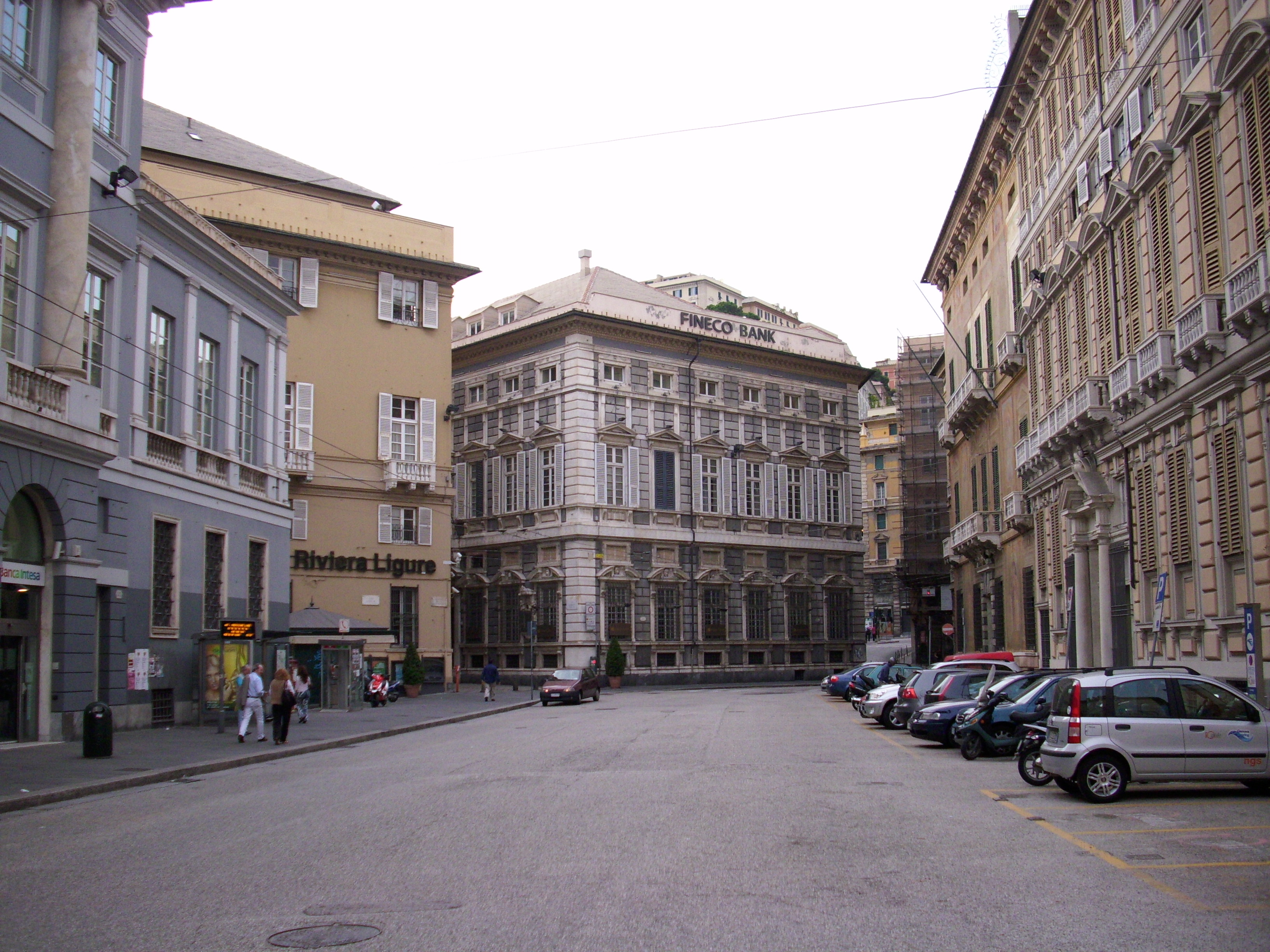
Piazza delle Fontane Marose

=== Piazza Caricamento and Sottoripa porches ===
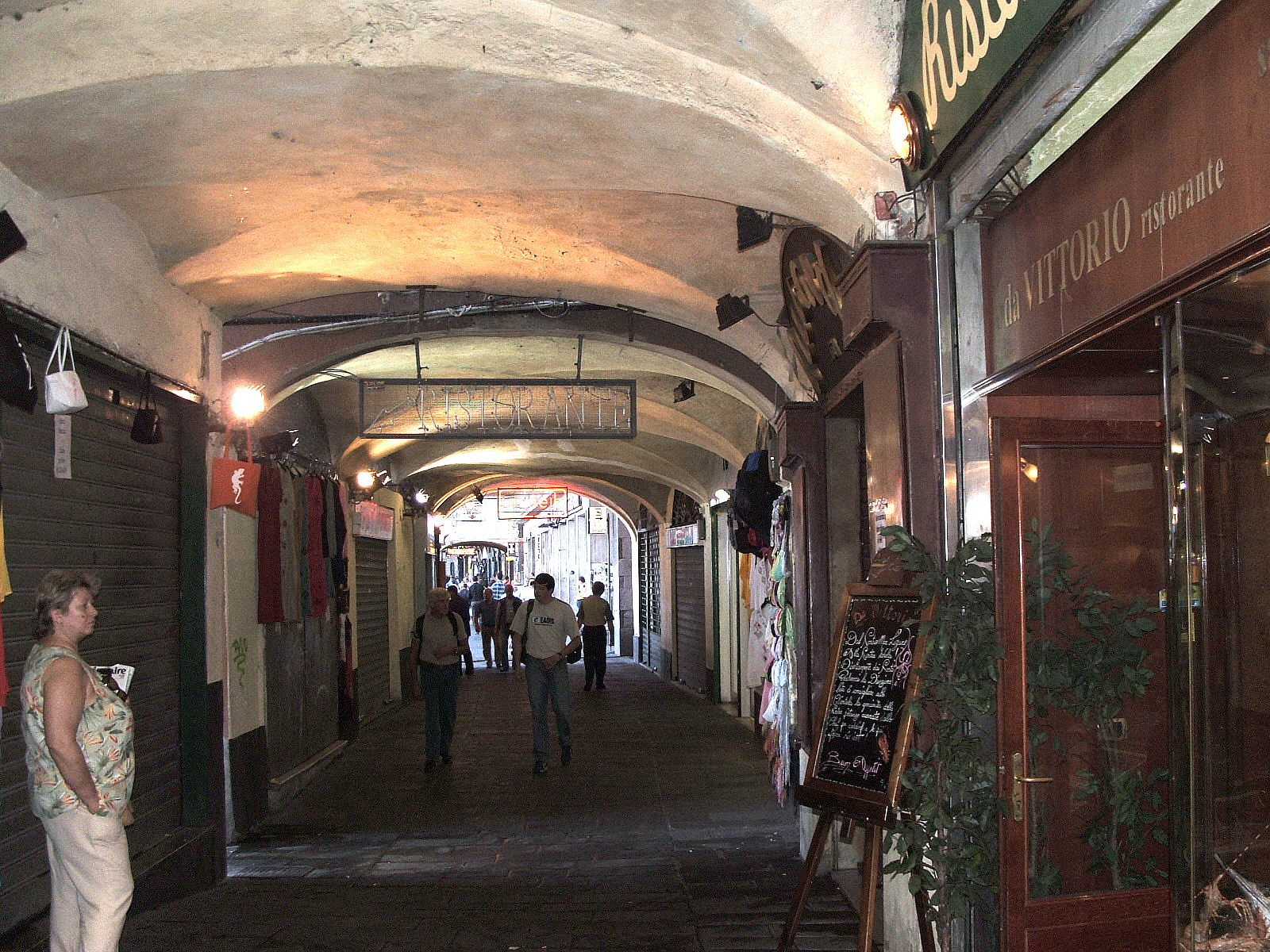
Detail of Sottoripa porches

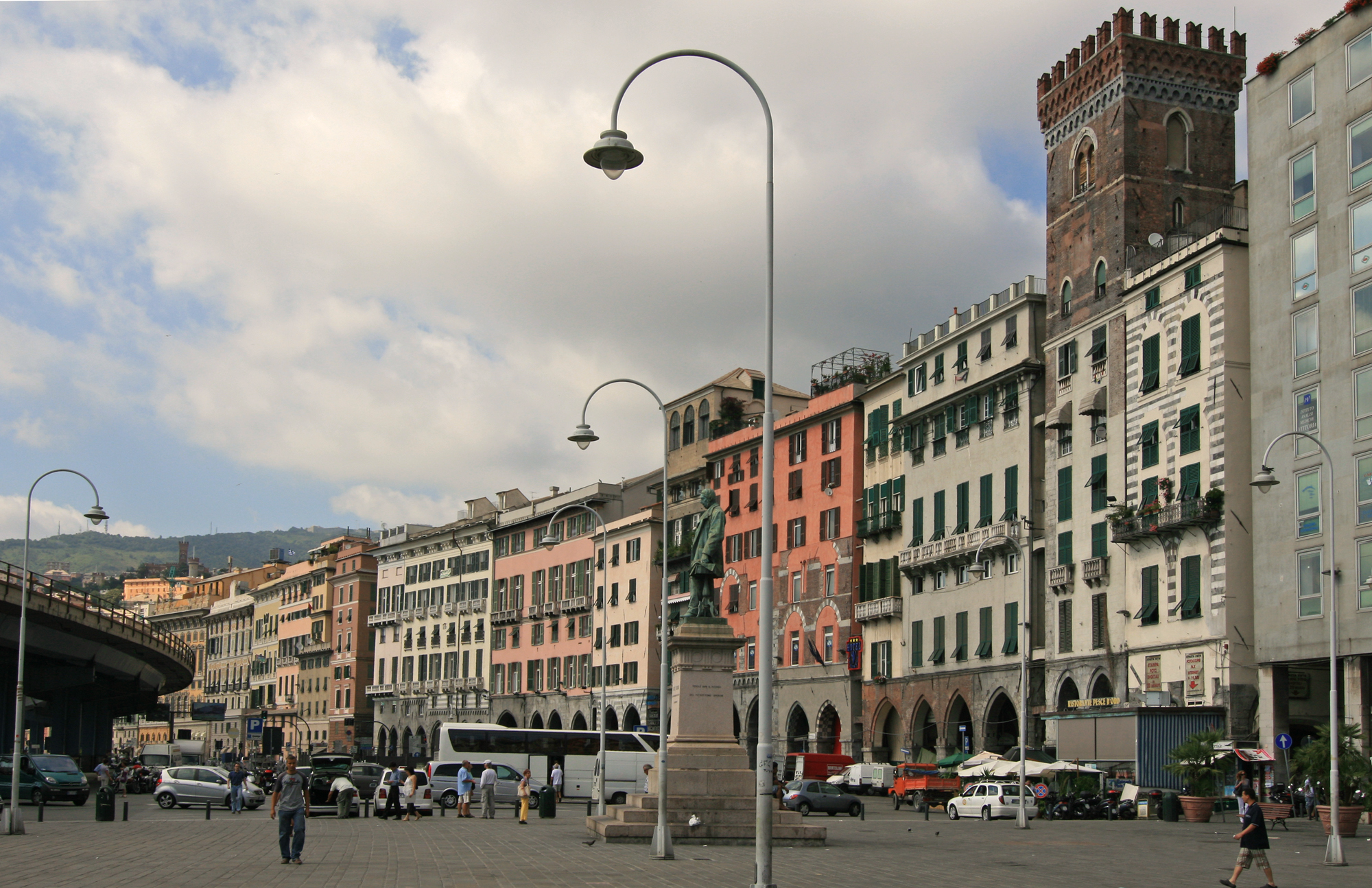
Piazza Caricamento

Piazza Caricamento was opened in the middle of the 19th century as the terminal railway station used for loading (in Italian caricamento) goods landed in the port. Many vintage pictures show the square full of wagons waiting for loading or unloading goods.

In the Middle Ages this area was occupied by the port quays and the sea came to lap the porch of Sottoripa, now facing the square. At the square center there is a bronze statue of Raffaele Rubattino, one of the main Italian shipowners, work of Augusto Rivalta (1889).

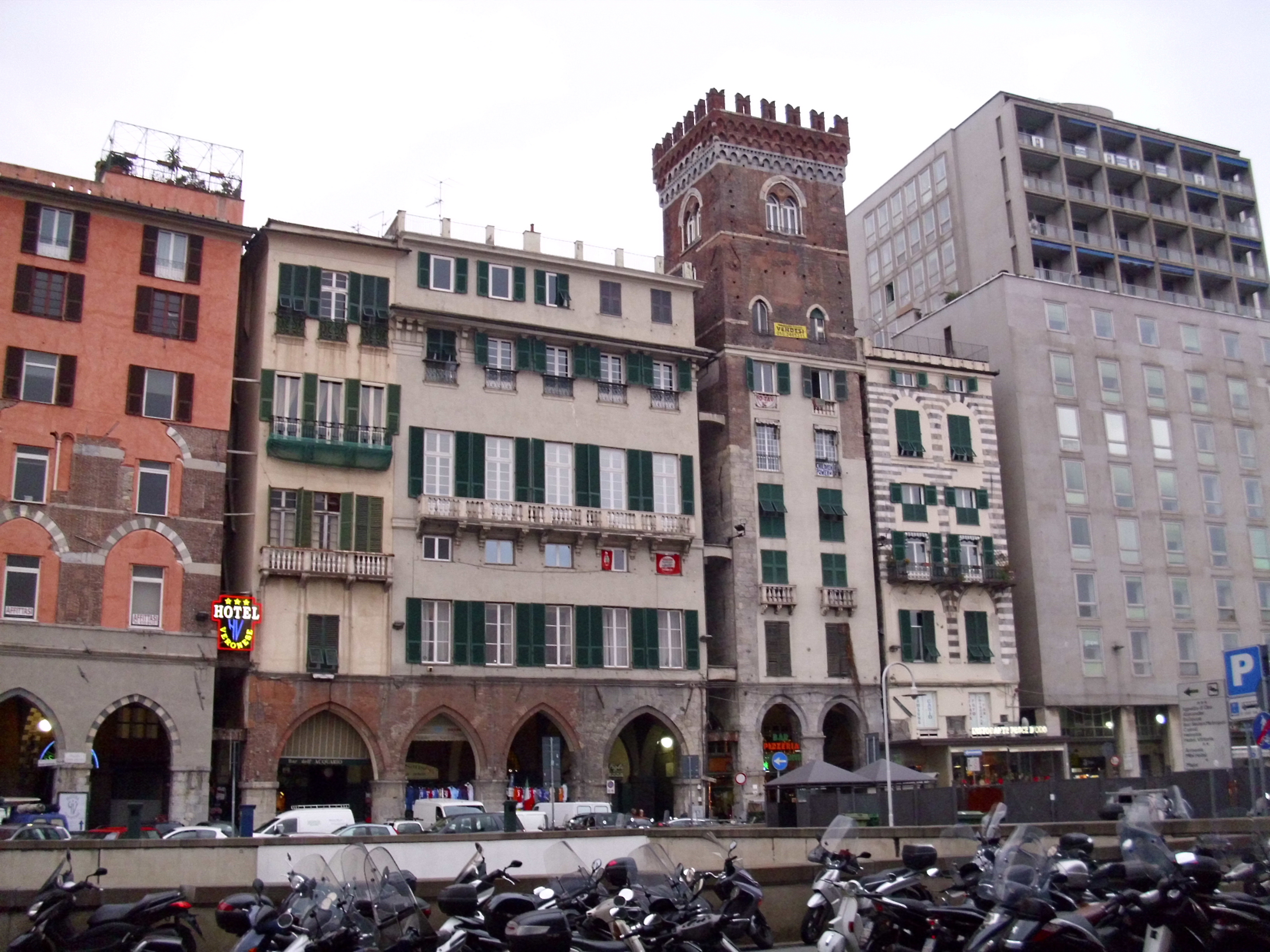
Sottoripa with Morchi tower

Sottoripa is a colonnaded street on the upstream border of the square, but it is much older than this. The porches were built between 1125 and 1133 and they were at that time directly overlooking the harbour. The porches are about 300 m long and occupy the entire sea front of the neighbourhood. Sottoripa means "below the bank", because the porticos foundations were literally below the level of the sea. Under the porches there were shops, workshops and fondachi, warehouses to store goods.

=== Palazzi dei Rolli ===
The Rolli di Genova were, at the time of the Republic of Genoa, an official list of public lodging palaces of eminent Genoese families which aspired to host, by draw, foreign notable people visiting Genoa. Most of these buildings still exist, and in 2006 forty-two of them were inscribed by UNESCO in the list of World Heritage Site.

In Maddalena are 49 of these palaces (29 of which included in the list of World Heritage Site, included most of those of the "new streets").

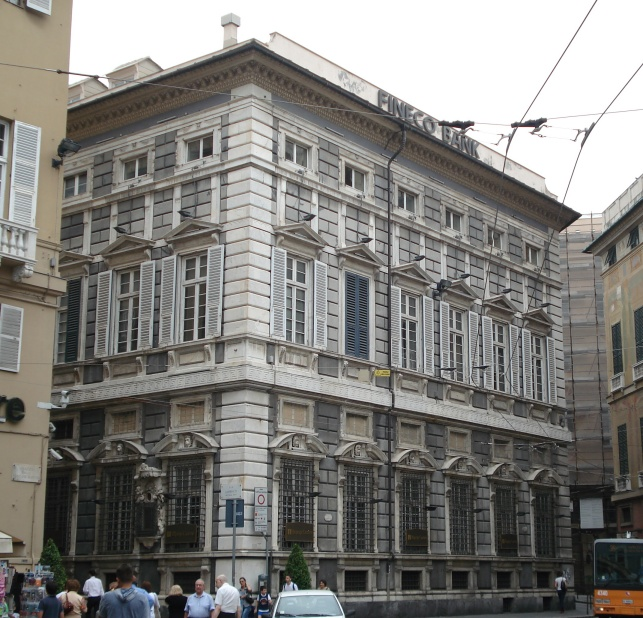
Palace Pallavicini-Cambiaso in via Garibaldi

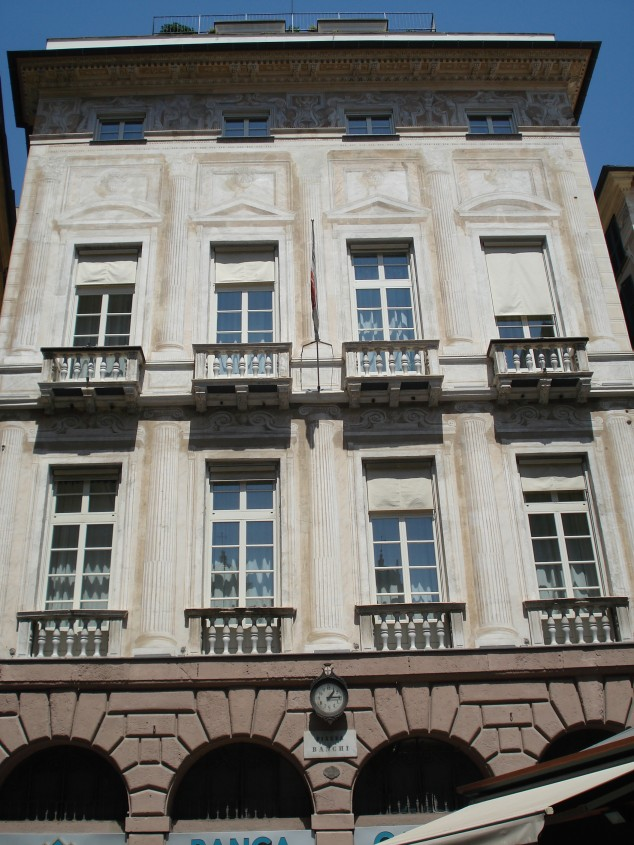
Palace Ambrogio Di Negro

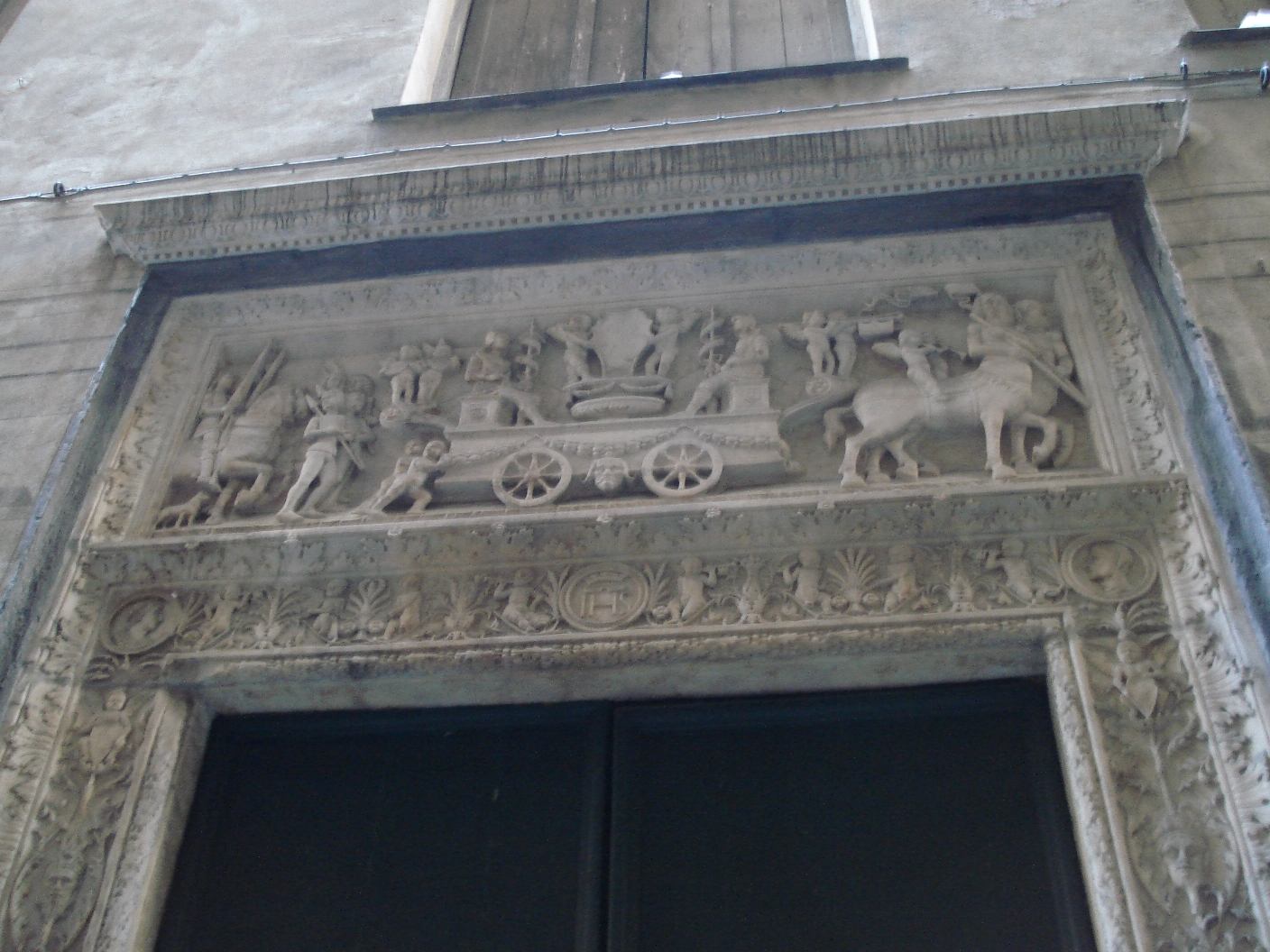
Portal of the Palace Jacopo Spinola, by Pace Gaggini

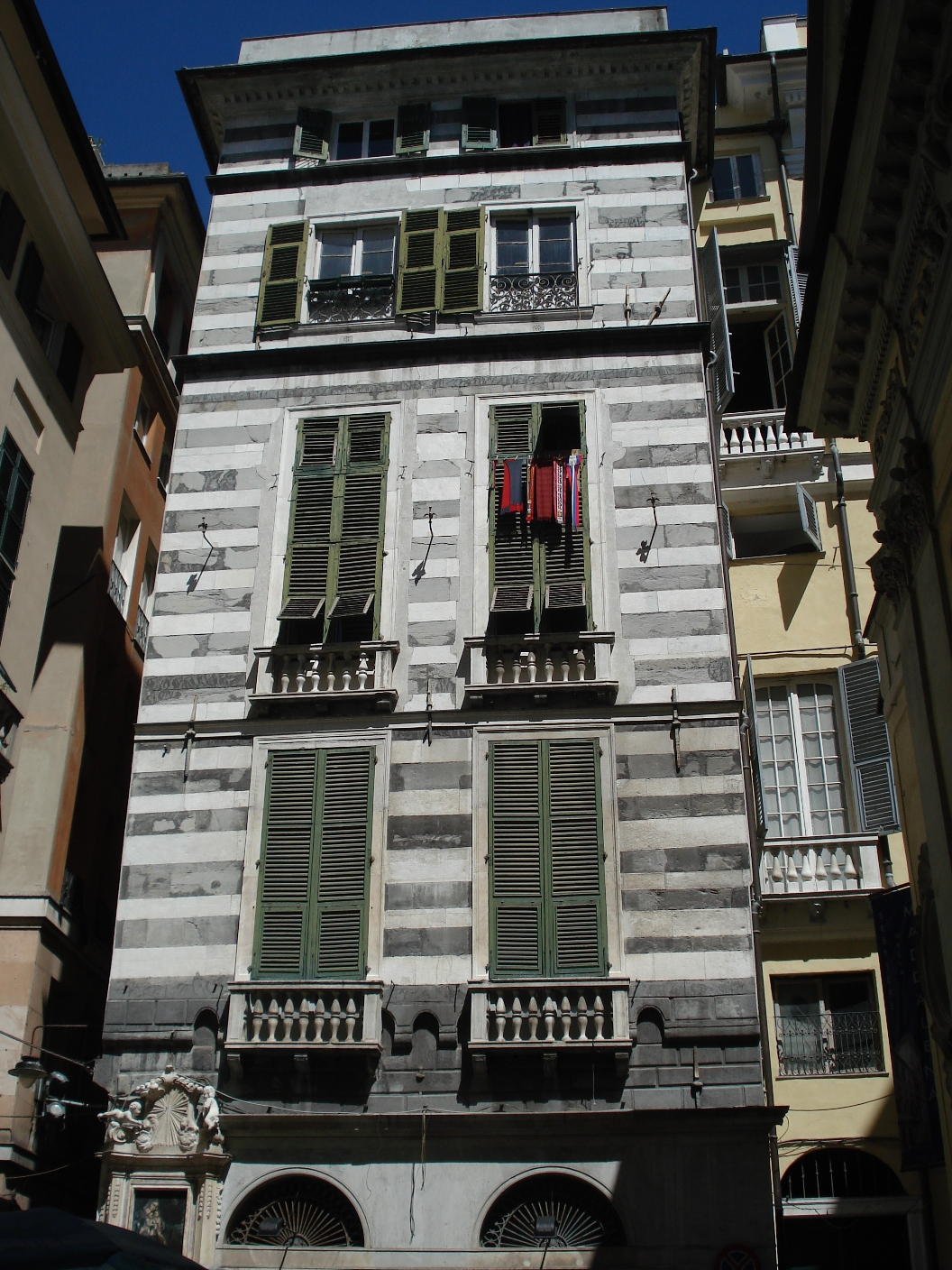
Façade of the Palace Nicola Grimaldi

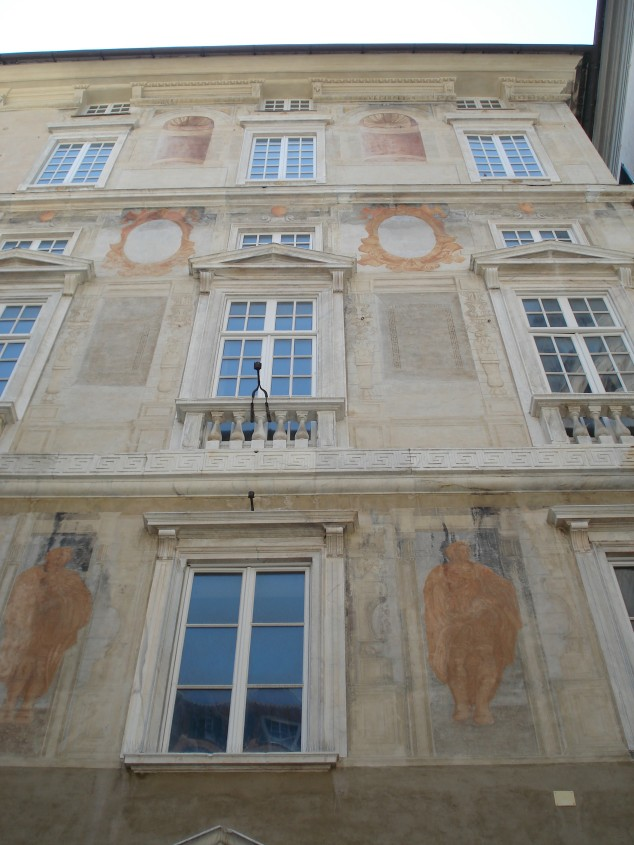
Façade of the Palace Domenico Grillo

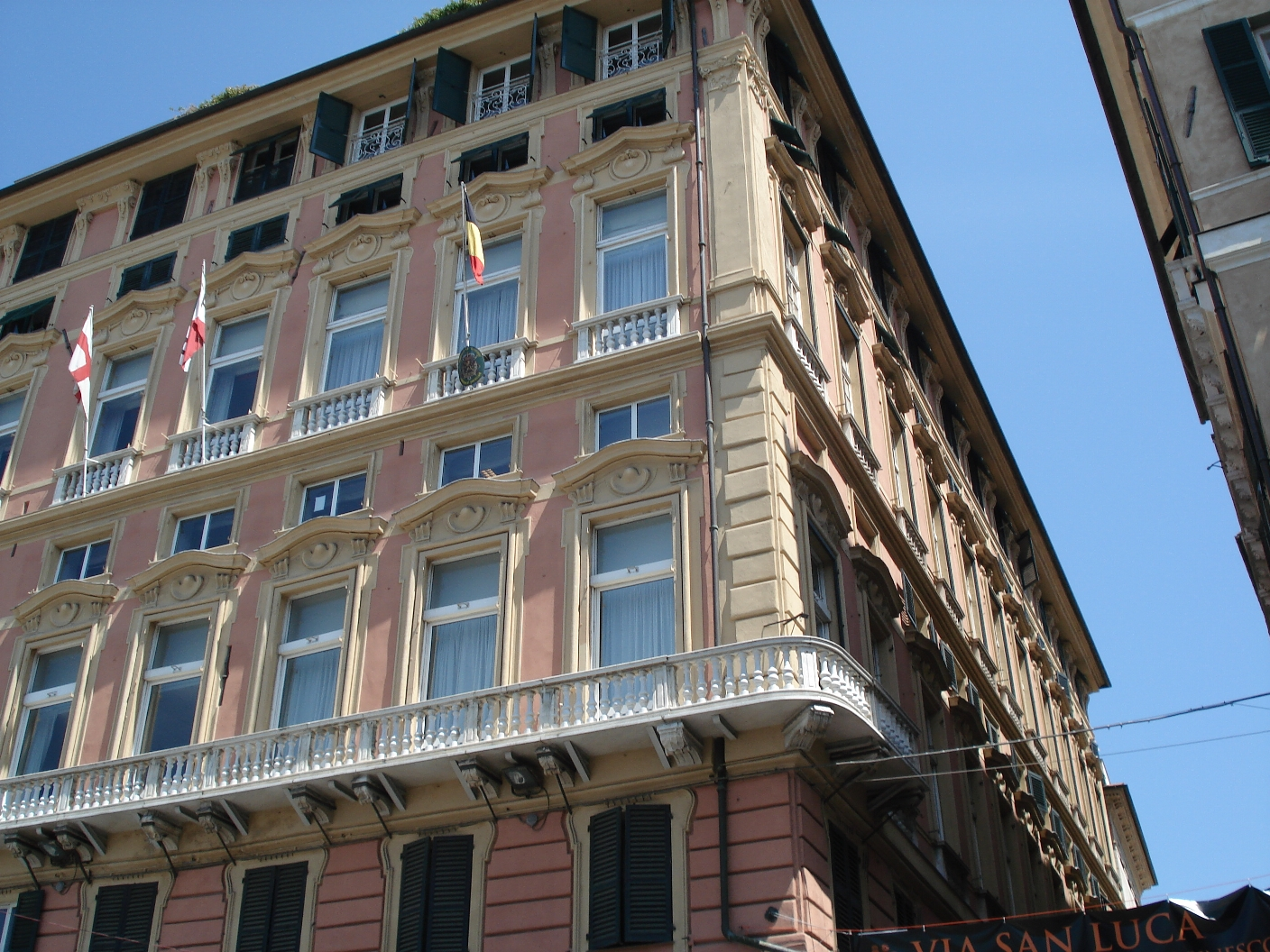
Palace Emanuele Filiberto Di Negro

=== Other buildings ===
- Doria-Spinola Palace was built in 1543, likely by Bernardino Cantone, for the admiral Antonio Doria, but later became a property of the Spinola family. In the façades and in the loggia there are frescoes of famous artists of the 16th century. The western loggia was demolished in 1877 due to the opening of via Roma. Now the palace hosts the Prefettura (local office of the national government).
- Loggia dei Mercanti, located in piazza Banchi, is a wide rectangular room with glass walls, designed at the end of the 16th century by Andrea Ceresola as venue for the trading of goods and currencies. From 1855 to 1912 it was the seat of the Genoa stock exchange; during World War II the roof was severely damaged by bombings; since its restoration it is used as a venue for exhibitions and cultural events.
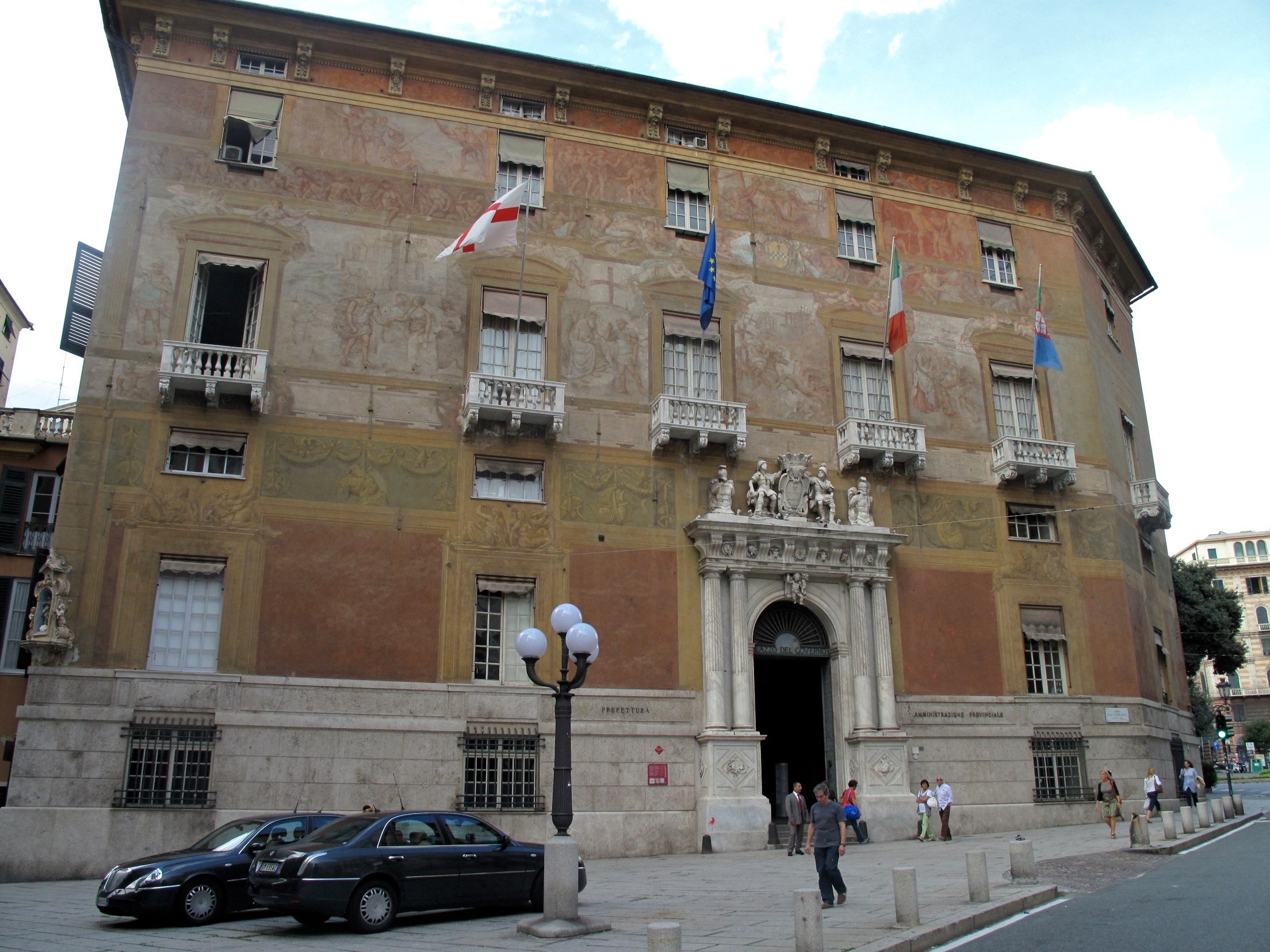
Palace Doria-Spinola

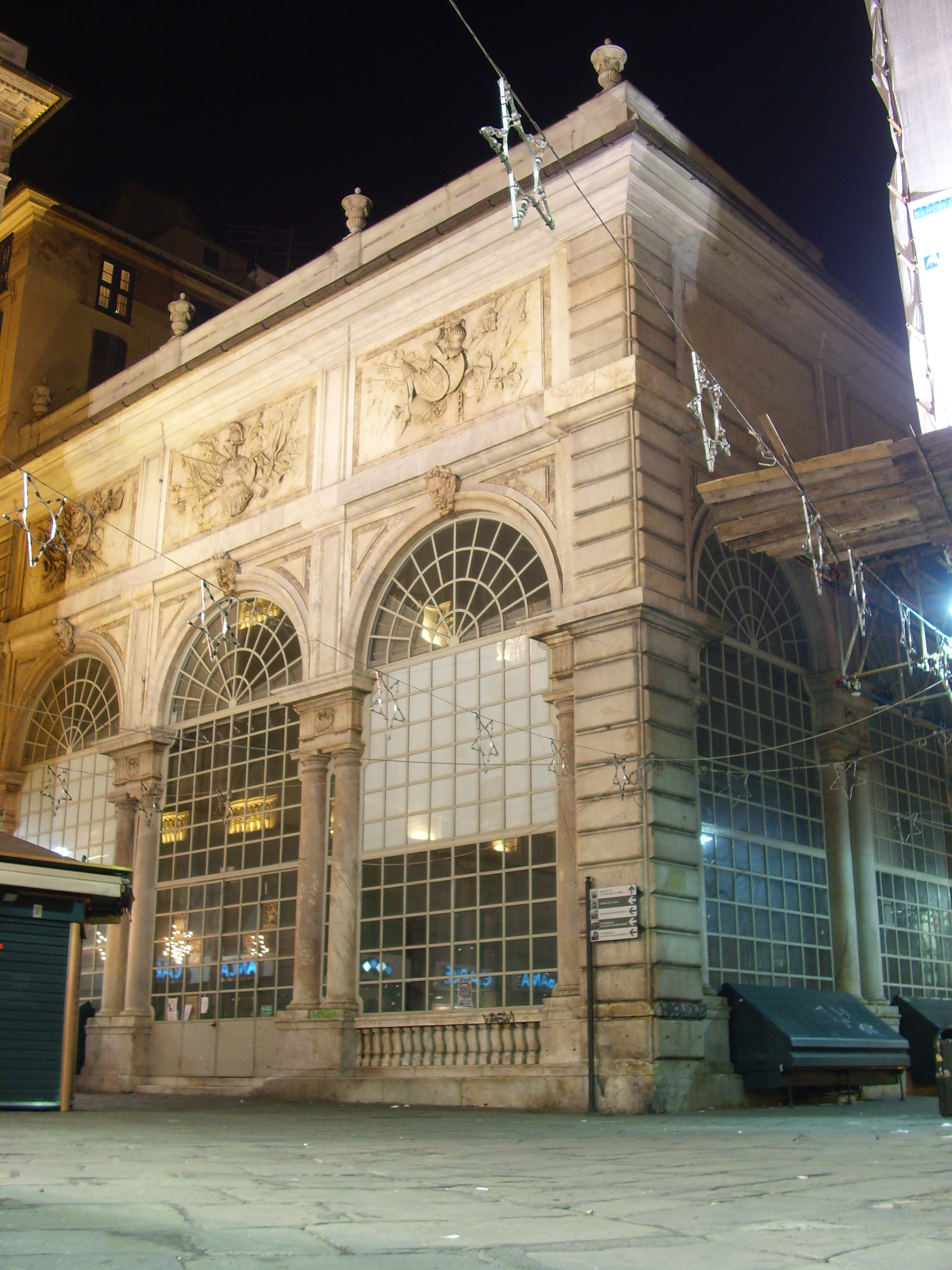
Loggia dei Mercanti

=== City walls and gates ===
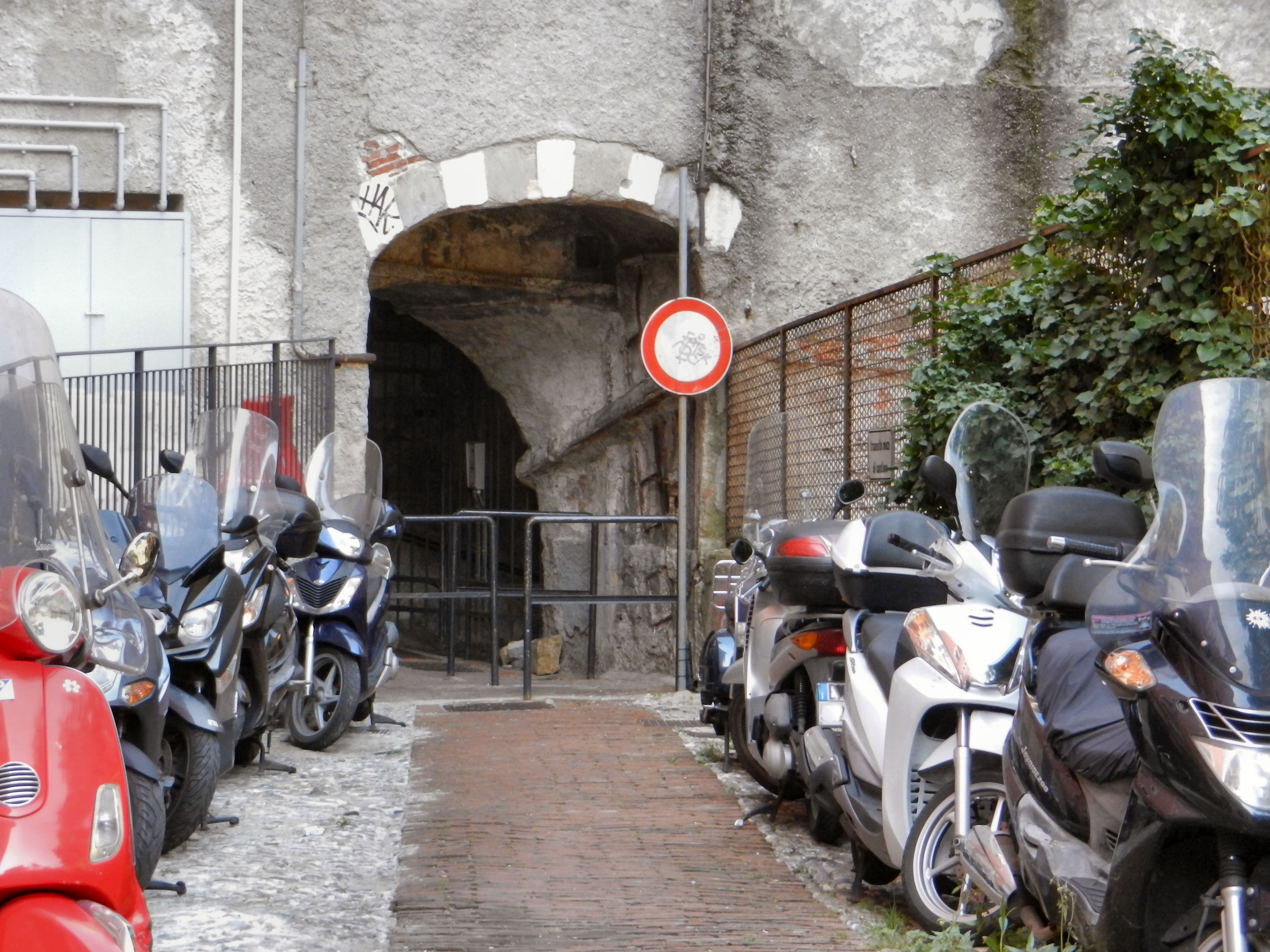
Pastorezza gate

The neighbourhood was included in the 12th century Barbarossa's walls but almost nothing remains of them in this district, except the small Pastorezza gate, behind the "Meridiana Palace".

=== Old harbour ===
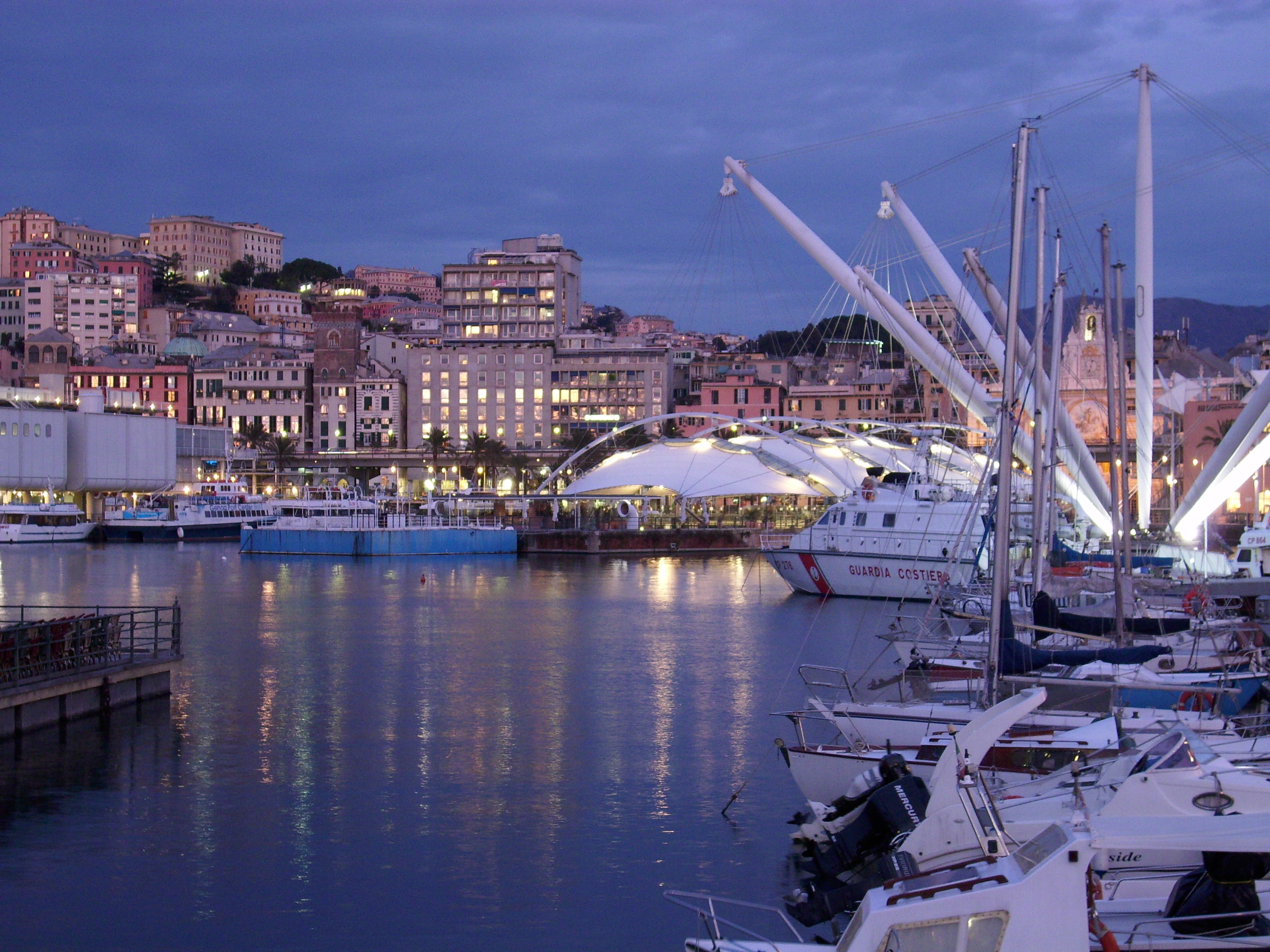
View of old harbour

The three neighbourhoods of the old town of Genoa overlook the old harbour. The sea front of Maddalena coincides with the quays in front of Piazza Caricamento.

In the Middle Ages the harbour was strictly linked to the city, but in 1536 new city walls were built that divided for a long time the city and the port. Only in 1992, being unused this part of the port, in the meantime enlarged towards the west, this area was redeveloped by Renzo Piano and opened to public access during Genoa Expo '92 exhibition.

The main tourist attraction in this section of the old harbour is the aquarium, in front of which there is the Biosphere, known commonly as la bolla (the bubble), a glass and steel structure hosting inside plants and animals of the rainforest, designed by Renzo Piano and built in 2001.

Nearby the aquarium there is the Neptune, replica of a 17th-century galleon, built in 1986 for the Roman Polanski's film Pirates and now moored in the old harbour of Genoa as a tourist attraction.

==== Aquarium ====
Aquarium of Genoa is the largest aquarium in Italy and the second-largest in Europe, following that of Valencia, in Spain.

It was inaugurated in 1992 and after several enlargements occupies at present an area of 9,400 m^{2}, with tanks that host fishes and reptiles. Some wide tanks host dolphins, sharks, seals, manatees, turtles and jellyfishes.

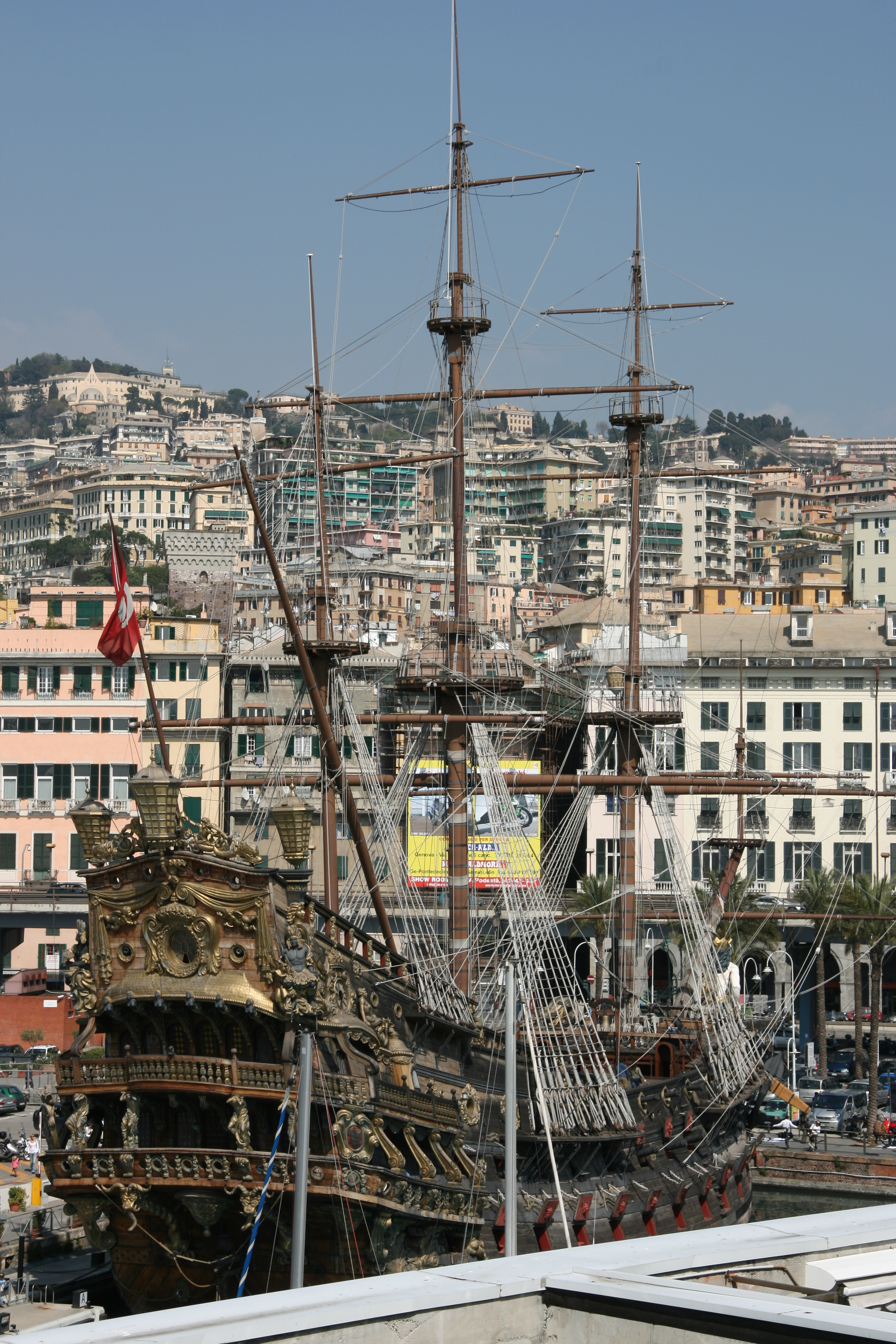
The galleon Neptune

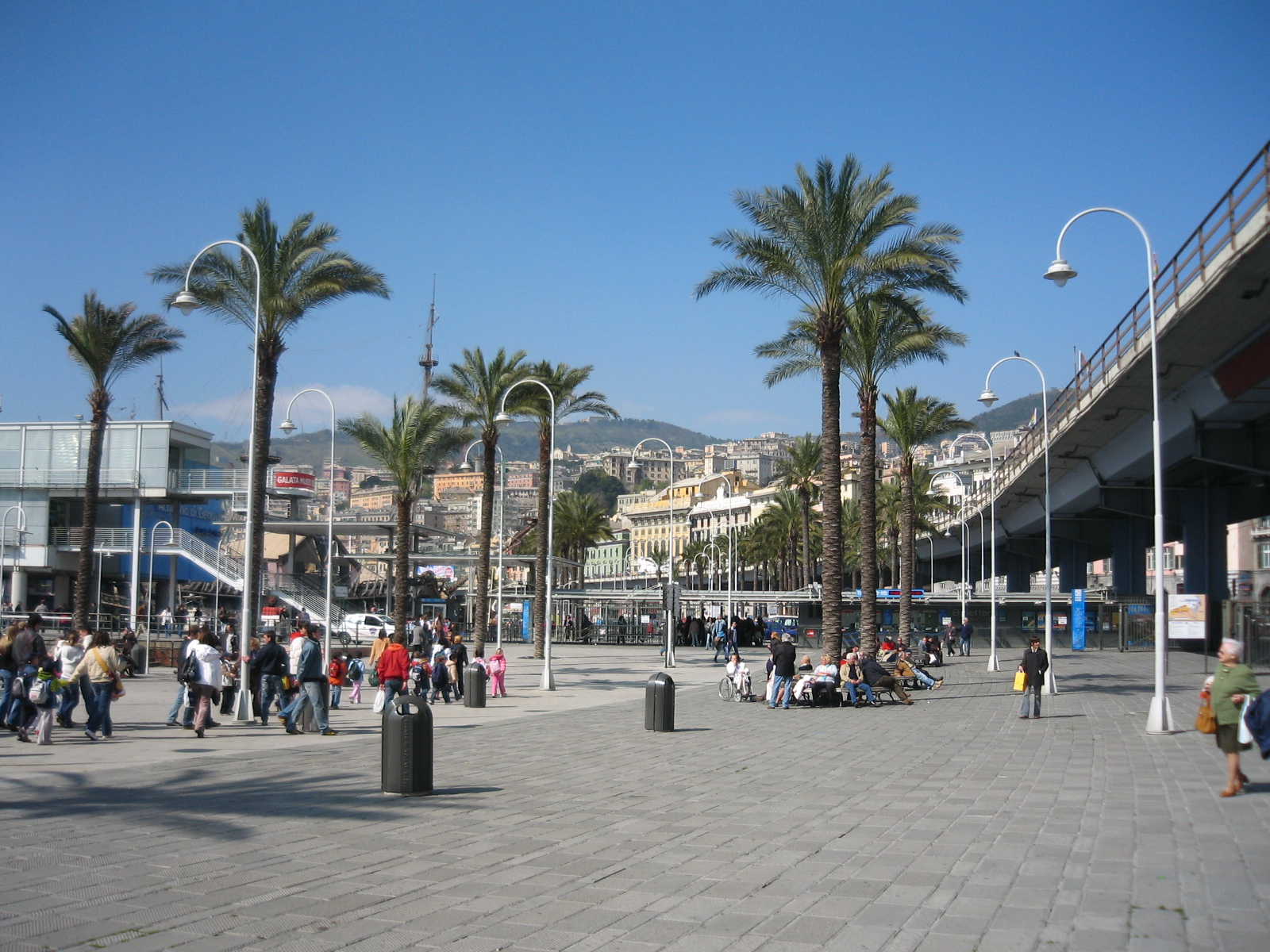
L'area antistante l'acquario

=== Museums ===
- Museums of Strada Nuova. The galleries housed in the Palazzo Bianco, Palazzo Rosso and some rooms of Palazzo Doria Tursi together constitute since 2004 the "Museums of Strada Nuova". The museum tour starts from Palazzo Rosso, with paintings from the 15th to the 19th century and furniture from the 18th to the 20th century. In the Palazzo Bianco are displayed works by Italian, Flemish and Spanish artist from the 15th century onwards, among them an Ecce Homo by Caravaggio; in Palazzo Doria Tursi a Penitent Magdalene by Antonio Canova is exposed, in addition to the collections of ceramics, coins and the Cannone, the Paganini's violin, an 18th-century work by the luthier Giuseppe Antonio Guarneri, known as Guarneri del Gesù.
- National Gallery of Palazzo Spinola is located in the Palazzo Spinola di Pellicceria, a historic building in the alleys of the old town, donated in 1958 by the heirs of the Spinola to the Italian Government, with its furnishings and artworks. The gallery houses paintings by the greatest Genoese painters of the 16th and 17th century and artworks by important Italian and European artists, like an Ecce Homo by Antonello da Messina and the Equestrian portrait of Giovanni Carlo Doria by Pieter Paul Rubens.
- Museum of Risorgimento is located in via Lomellini 11, in the birth house of Giuseppe Mazzini, which houses Mazzini's relics and the historical archive of the Risorgimento of the city of Genoa, including collections of books, documents and images related to the Risorgimento and the Italian Wars of Independence.
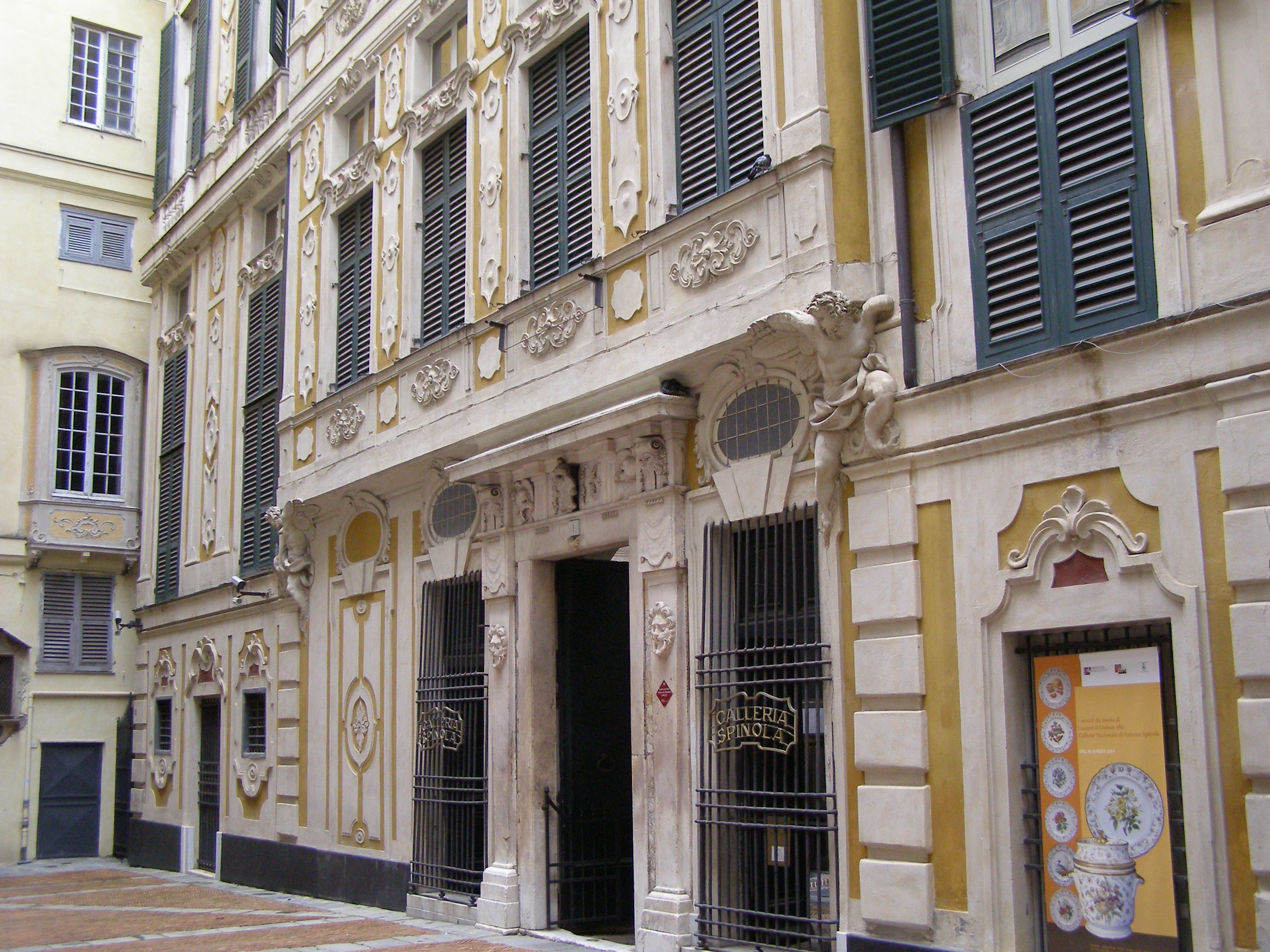
Palazzo Spinola di Pellicceria

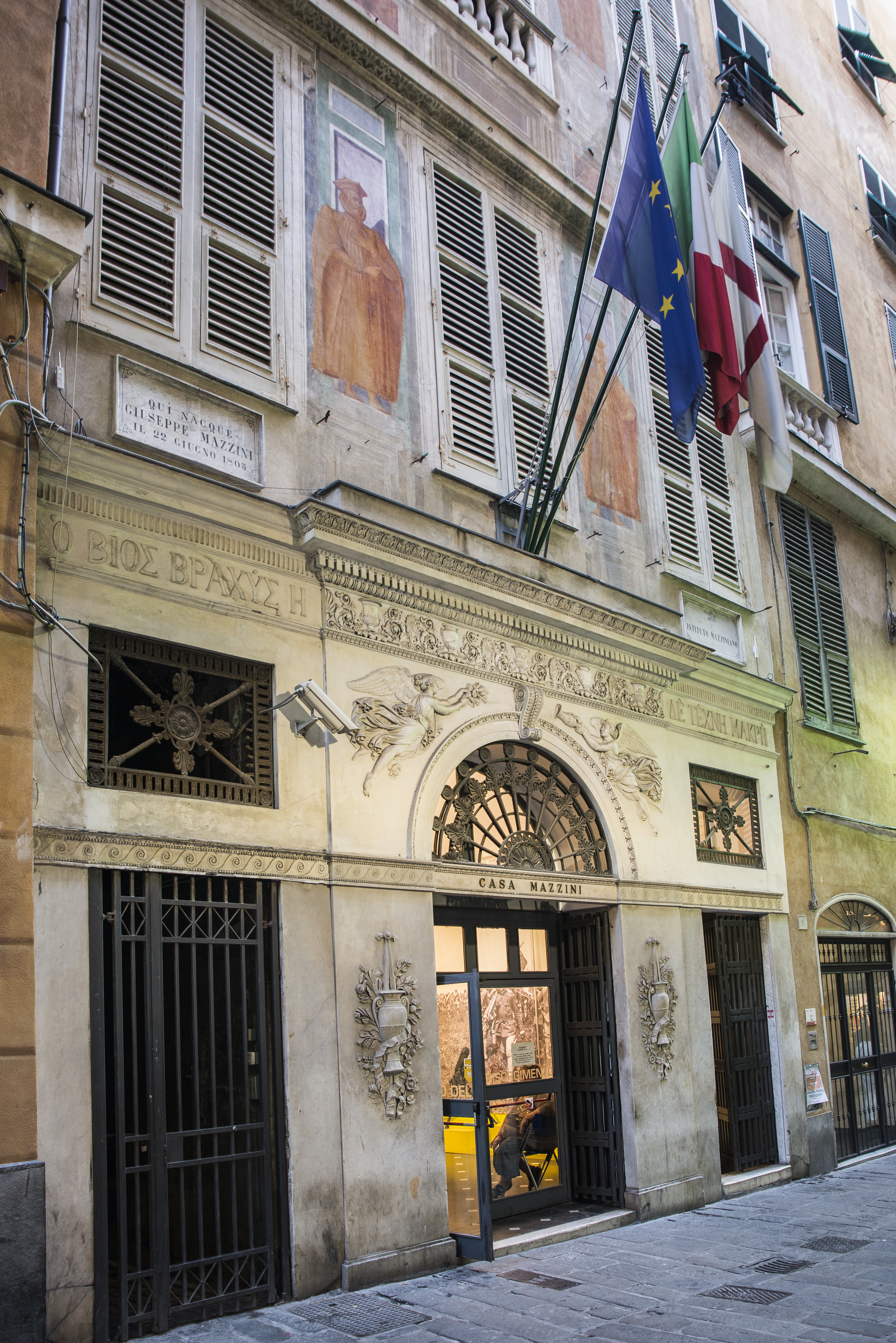
The Museum of Risorgimento

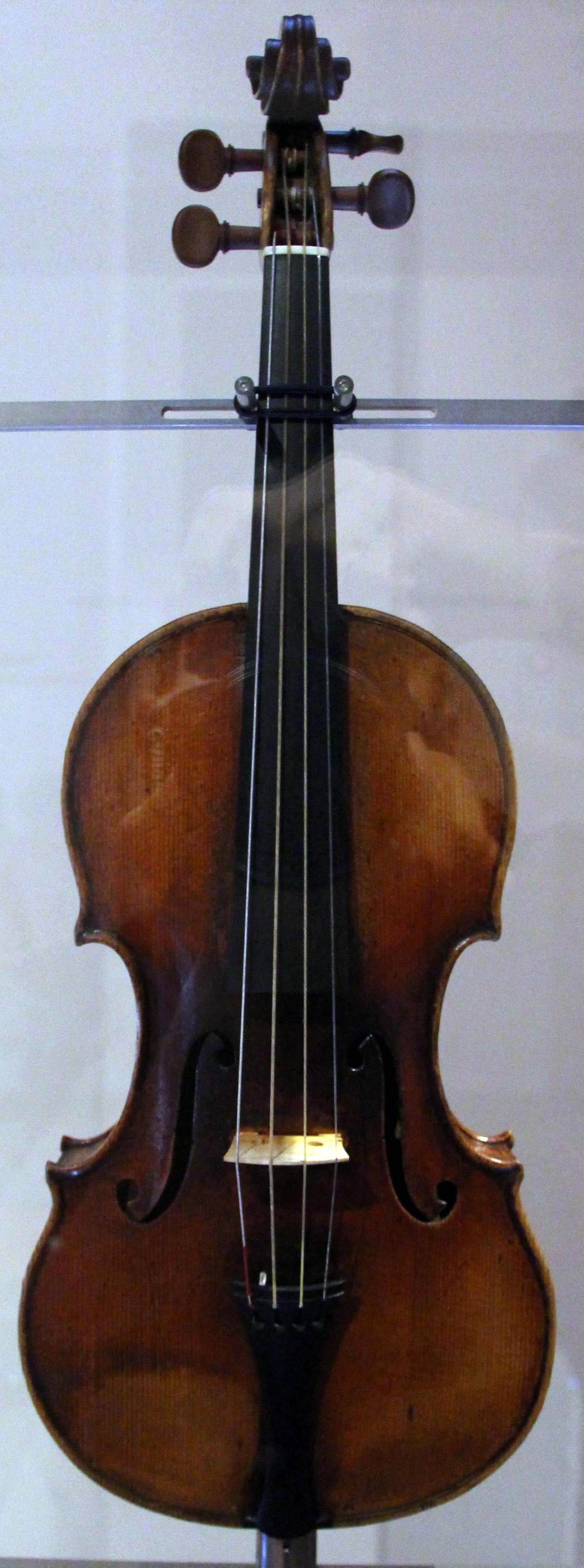
Paganini's Cannone

== Places of Worship ==
In the neighbourhood there are some of the oldest churches in Genoa.

- Santa Maria delle Vigne. The Basilica of Santa Maria delle Vigne (St. Mary of the Vineyards) was built by some ancestors of Spinola at the end of the 10th century in the same place where a 6th-century chapel existed, outside the Carolingian city walls, at that time a rural zone with vineyards (in Italian "vigne", hence the name). In the 12th century it was included within the new "Barbarossa's walls" and became a parish church. It was modified several times and in the late 16th century the original Romanesque church was transformed in Baroque style by Daniele Casella. The bell tower is the only preserved part of the original building. In the 19th century the church had a new Neoclassicist façade, designed by Ippolito Cremona. Many art works, mainly by Genoese artists from 17th to 19th centuries are preserved inside the church.
- San Siro was also built in the same place where another 6th-century chapel existed. The church, devoted to the Holy Apostles, was later dedicated to Syrus, one of the first bishops of Genoa, who lived in the 4th century, and was the cathedral of Genoa until the 10th century, when the bishop's seat was moved to the new church of San Lorenzo, less exposed to Saracen raids because included within the city walls. At the beginning of the 11th century it was given to Benedictines who built a new Romanesque church. In the 16th century it was entrusted to the Theatines who rebuilt it in Baroque style thanks to the financing of the noble families who had the giuspatronato of the chapels inside of the church. In the 19th century the church had a new Neoclassicist façade. The Romanesque bell tower was demolished in 1904 because it was unsafe and never rebuilt.
- Santa Maria Maddalena (Genoa), commonly known as the "Church of the Magdalene", which gives its name to the neighborhood, was built at the end of the 16th century in the place of an older chapel, and since 1572 was a parish church entrusted before to the Theatines and three years later to the Somasca Fathers, which still officiate in the church. The rebuilding, designed by Andrea Ceresola were completed in 1661.
- San Luca (Genoa), founded in 1188 by Oberto Spinola as a seigneurial church of Spinola and Grimaldi. In the first half of 16th century it was modified into Baroque appearance by the Lombard architect Carlo Mutone. The church preserves frescoes by Domenico Piola, the imposing marble group of the Immaculate with angels by Filippo Parodi and a painting depicting the Nativity, by the Grechetto.
- San Pancrazio is located in a little square behind Sottoripa. Documented since 1023, in 1593 it became the seigneurial church of Calvi and Pallavicini. Almost completely destroyed by the French naval bombardment in 1684, it was rebuilt in late Baroque style by Antonio Maria Ricca. Since 1976 it is entrusted to the Sovereign Military Order of Malta. The church preserves frescoes by Giacomo Boni, statues by Filippo Parodi and Francesco Maria Schiaffino and a triptych depicting episodes of the life of Saint Pancras, attributed to the Flemish painter Adriaen Isenbrant.
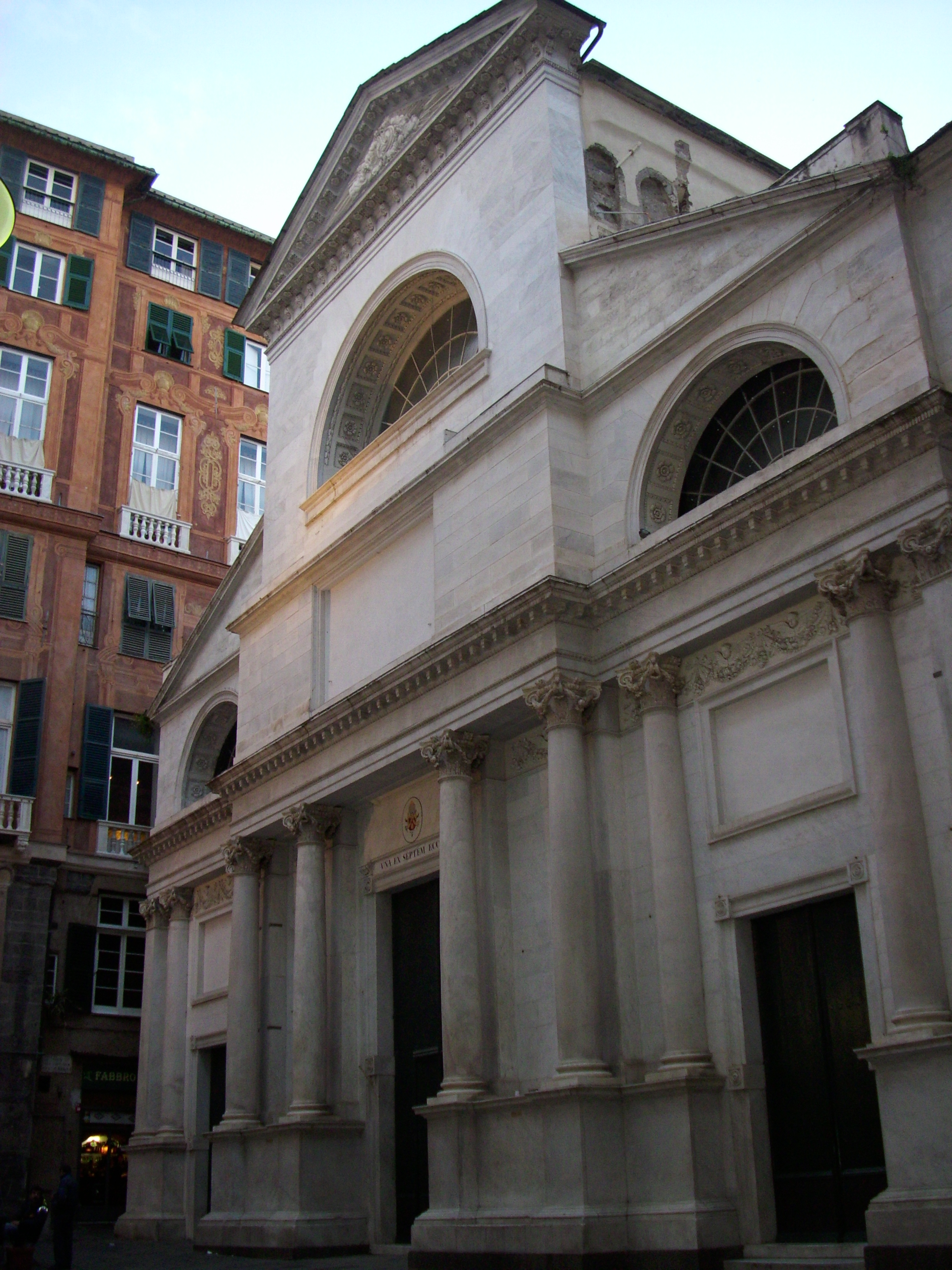
Façade of S. Maria delle Vigne

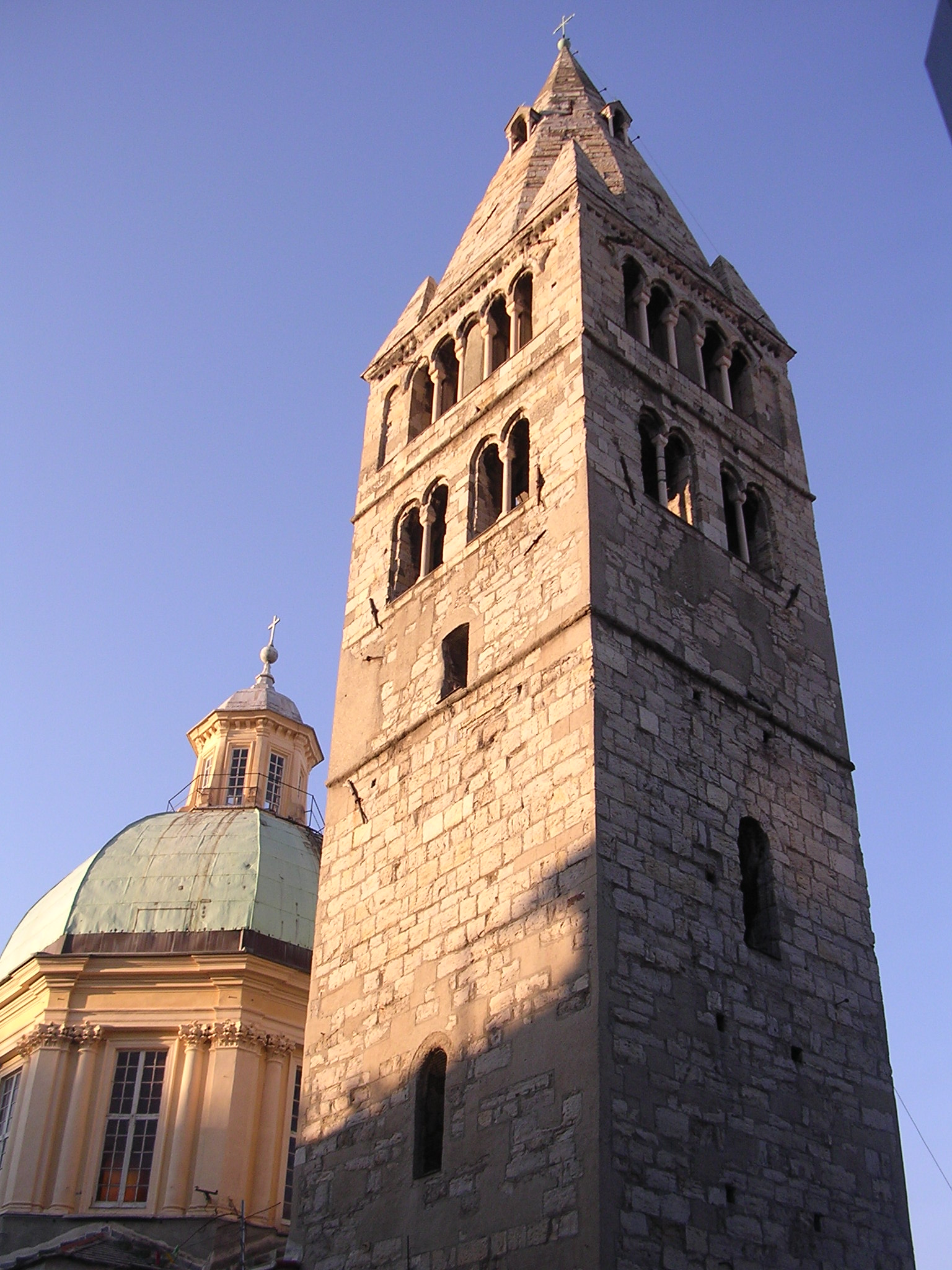
Bell tower of S. Maria delle Vigne

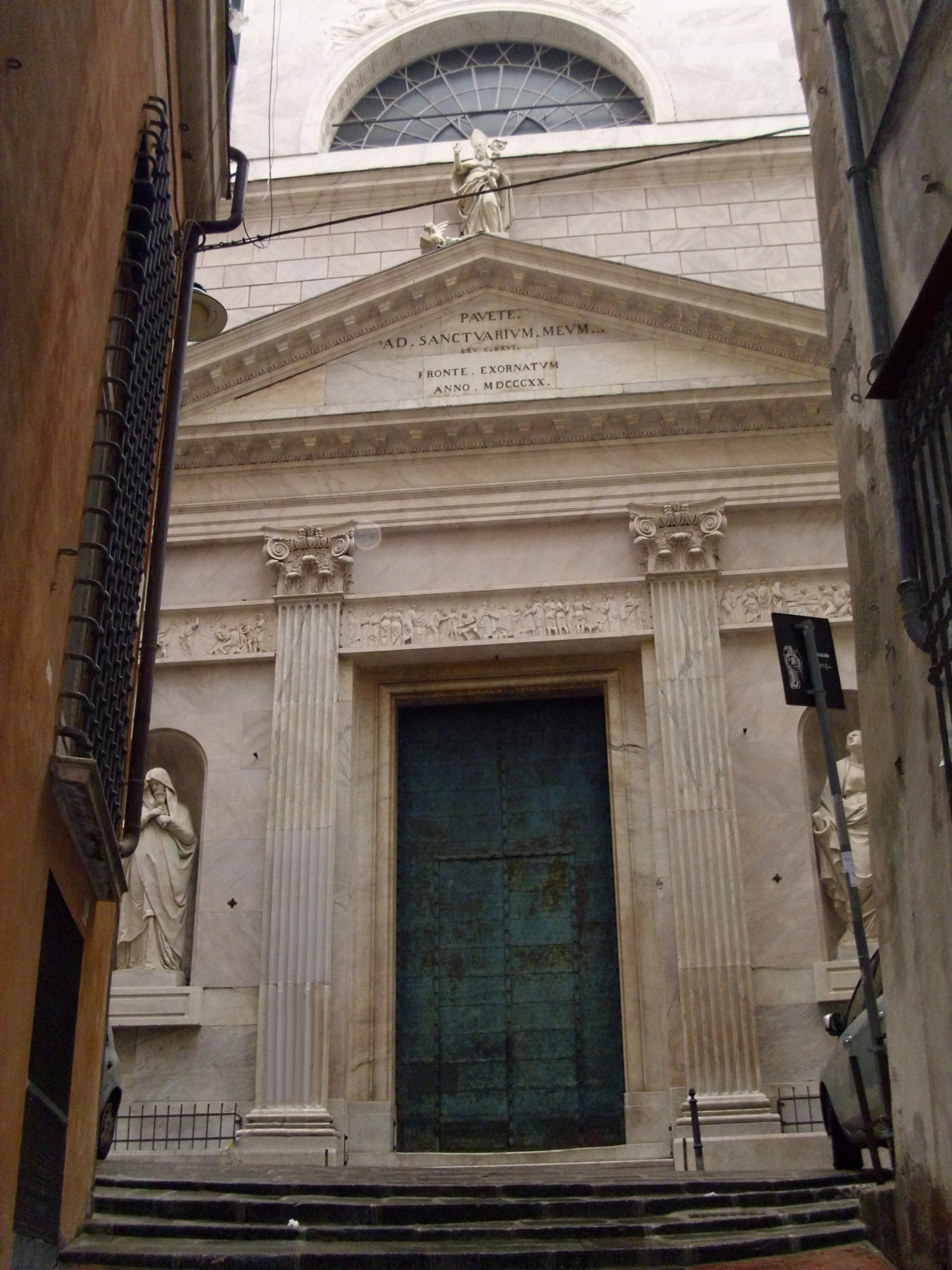
San Siro

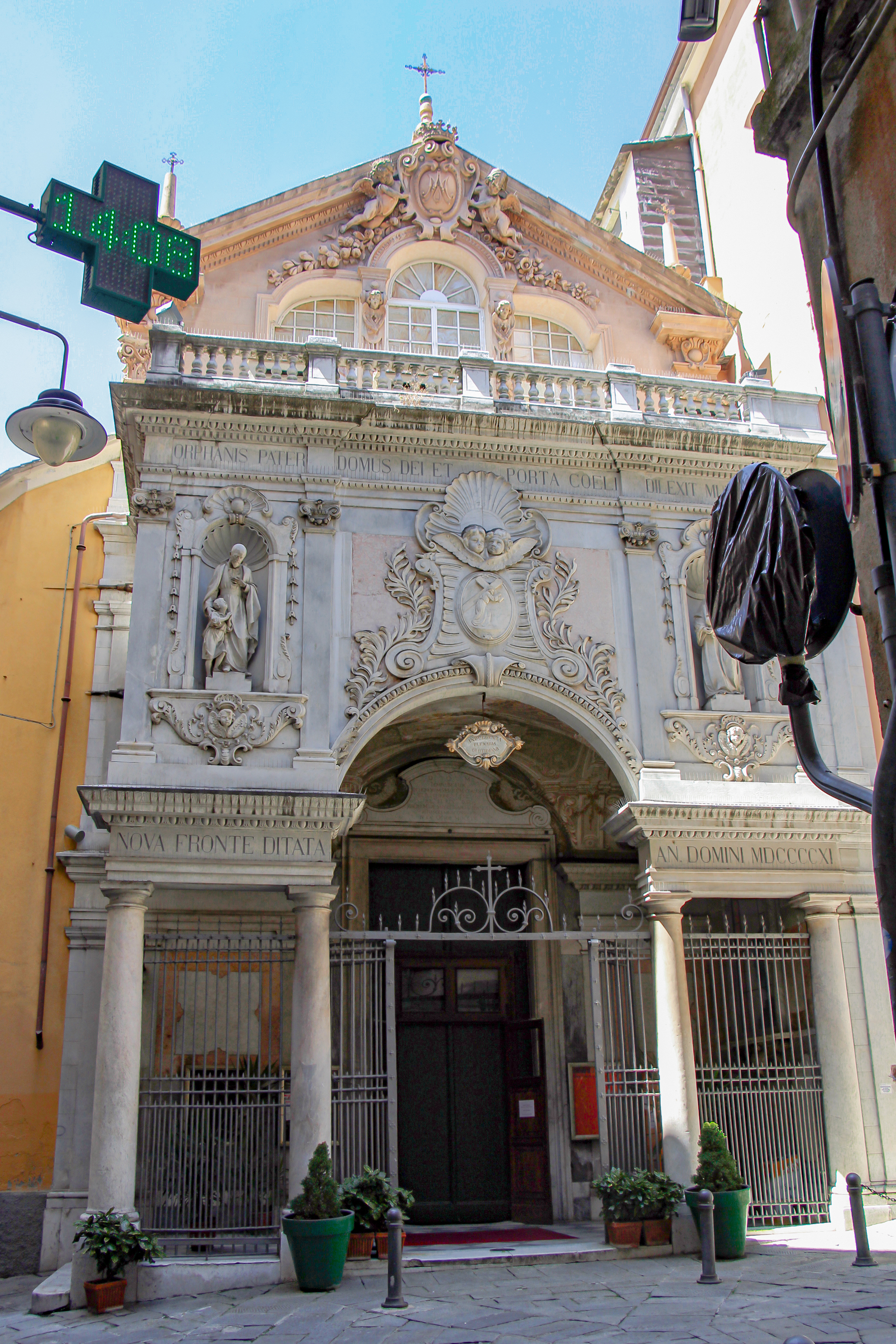
S. Maria Maddalena

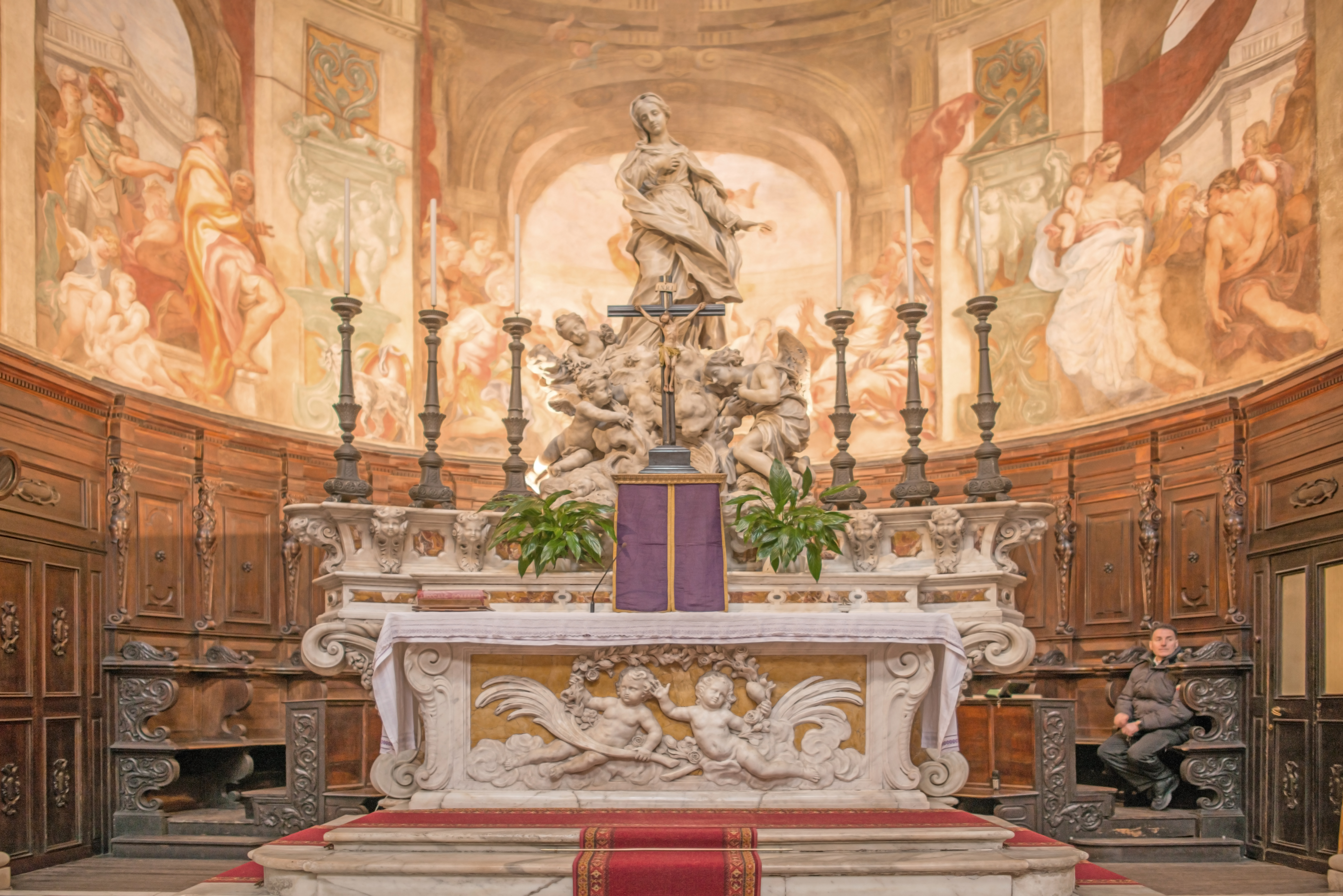
Interior of San Luca and the statue of Immaculate, by Filippo Parodi

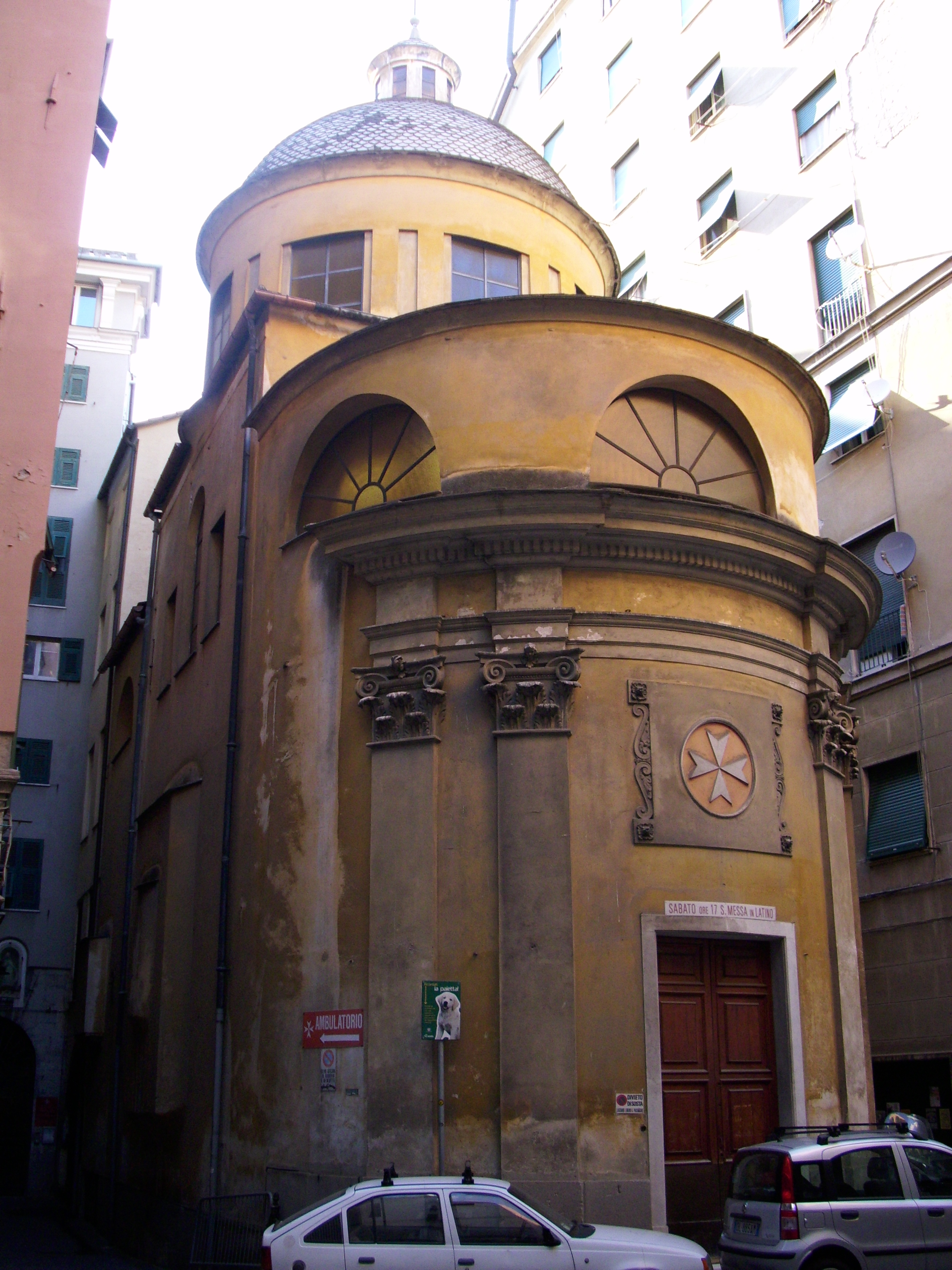
San Pancrazio

== Notable people ==
- Giuseppe Mazzini (1805-1872), activist of Italian unification and founder of Giovine Italia, was born in via Lomellini; his house is now seat of the Museum of Risorgimento
- Giacomo Della Chiesa (pope Benedict XV, 1854-1922), lived in Maddalena till his 21 years and he was baptized in the Basilica of Santa Maria delle Vigne.
- Marco Doria (1957), mayor of Genoa from 2012 to 2017; he lives in Maddalena

Many families who gave over the centuries an important contribution to the history of the Republic of Genoa had in Maddalena their palaces and business, among them Spinola, Calvi, De Franchi, Di Negro, Finamore, Grimaldi, Grillo, Senarega, Pallavicini, Pinelli and Usodimare.

== Bibliography ==
- Guida d'Italia - Liguria. TCI, Milan. 2009.
- Caraceni Poleggi, Fiorella (1984). Genova - Guida Sagep. SAGEP and Automobile Club of Genoa.
- Casalis, Goffredo (1841). Dizionario geografico, storico, statistico e commerciale degli stati di S.M. il Re di Sardegna. G. Maspero, Turin.
