= Bruce (Russian nobility) =

Russian noble family of Scottish heritage

- Coat of Arms of Count James Daniel Bruce
- Parent house: Clan Bruce
- Country: Russian Empire
- Motto: Fuimus
- Estates: Glinky, Ulianovo, House of Bruce

The Bruce family (Russian: Брюсы) is the name of Russian noble family of Scottish origin. The family members bear the title of Count.

== Notable members ==
- Jacob Bruce (Russian: Граф Яков Вилимович Брюс), (1669 – 1735) was a Russian statesman, military leader and scientist of Scottish descent (Clan Bruce), according to his own record, his ancestors had lived in Russia since 1649. He was the brother of Robert Bruce, the first military governor of Saint Petersburg.
- Count Roman Vilimovich Bruce, (1668 – 1720) was the first chief commander of Saint Petersburg. Of Scottish descent, he was the brother of Jacob Bruce and father of Alexander Romanovich Bruce. In 1683, Bruce joined the personal armed forces of Peter I, in 1695 receiving the rank of captain in the Preobrazhensky Regiment. He took part in the Azov campaigns of Peter I (1695–6) and probably accompanied Peter on his travels abroad (1697–1698).
  - Count Alexander Romanovich Bruce, (1704–1760) was a lieutenant general in the Imperial Russian army. He fought in the War of the Polish Succession in 1733, in Russo-Turkish War (1735-1739) and the Russo-Swedish War (1741–43).
    - Count Yakov Alexandrovich Bruce (1732 – 1791) was a Russian general. He was a grandson of Lieutenant General Robert Bruce and great-nephew of Jacob Bruce. His father was Lieutenant Colonel Count Alexander Bruce, Ekaterina Alekseyevna Dolgorukova was his stepmother. James Bruce married Praskovia Rumiantseva, sister of General (and later Field Marshal) Pyotr Rumyantsev.
