= Alexandra Albedinskaya =

Russian noble and courtier

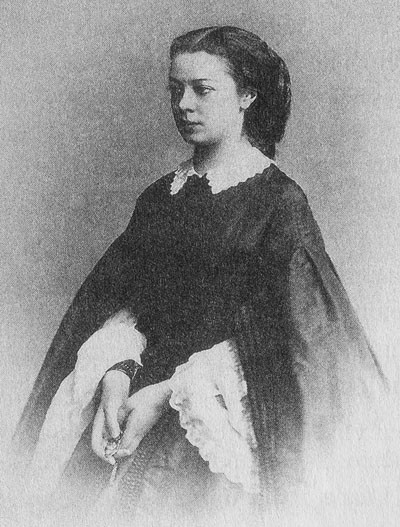
- Known for: Mistress of Alexander II of Russia
- Born: Alexandra Sergeyevna Dolgorukova; 30 November 1834; Saint Petersburg, Russian Empire
- Died: 30 August 1913 (aged 78); Cannes, France
- Noble family: Dolgorukov
- Spouse: Pyotr Albedinsky
- Issue: Maria Albedinskaya; Olga Albedinskaya; Alexander Albedinsky
- Father: Prince Sergei Alekseevich Dolgorukov
- Mother: Maria Alexandrovna Apraksina

Alexandra Sergeyevna Albedinskaya (Russian: Алекса́ндра Серге́евна Альбединская; 30 Novemeber [O.S. 18 November] 1834 – 30 August [O.S. 17 August] 1913) was a Russian noble and courtier.

Alexandra Albedinskaya, known as La Grande Mademoiselle was the royal mistress of Tsar Alexander II of Russia from the early 1850s until 1862.

== Biography ==
Alexandra Albedinskaya was born to chamberlain Prince Sergei Alekseevich Dolgorukov and Maria Alexandrovna, nee Countess Apraksina.

Alexandra Albedinskaya was a descendant of a member of the Supreme Privy Council of Prince Alexei Grigoryevich Dolgorukov. The latter betrothed one of his daughters, Ekaterina to the Russian Emperor, Peter II. Alexandra Sergeevna was a distant relative of Princess Ekaterina Mikhailovna Dolgorukova (1847–1922) (she was the fourth cousin of Mikhail Mikhailovich, father of the future Princess Yuryevskaya). Albedinskaya had four brothers ( Nikolai, Alexander, Alexei, Dmitry) and four sisters (Anna, Margarita, Varvara, Maria).

Alexandra Albedinskaya was baptised on 2 October [O.S. 20 November] 1834 in the Court Cathedral in the Winter Palace under the perception of Empress Alexandra Feodorovna and Grand Duke Alexander Nikolaevich (the future Alexander II).

=== Maid of honour ===
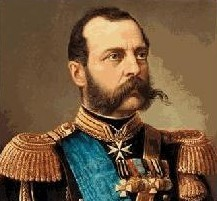
Alexander II circa 1880

In 1853, Alexandra Albedinskaya was appointed a maid of honour to the court of Empress Maria Alexandrovna. She was appointed in order to “free her from domestic oppression”. On which Tyutcheva wrote:

"They said that she was always the subject of hatred from her mother, who beat her so much that she developed a disease that resembled a herd in her. She fell into a state of tetanus, which sometimes lasted for whole hours.” Dolgorukova “was amazingly gifted, perfectly fluent, spoke five or six languages, read a lot, was very educated and was able to use the subtlety of her mind without the slightest shadow of pedantry or frivolity, juggling thoughts and especially paradoxes with a slight grace of a magician."

According to Anna Tyutcheva, she initially had friendly relations with Alexandra Albedinskaya, but then “instinctively felt in her whole being some kind of isolation, which made me restrained as well.”

Alexandra was known for her intelligence and beauty. She soon drew the attraction of the Tsarevich, and Maria Alexandrovna's husband, Alexander Nikolaevich. The relationship was encouraged by some conservative members of the court who sought to reduce the influence of Maria Alexandrovna. When the empress discovered the affair, she rebuked her husband and was estranged from him for some time.

== Marriage ==
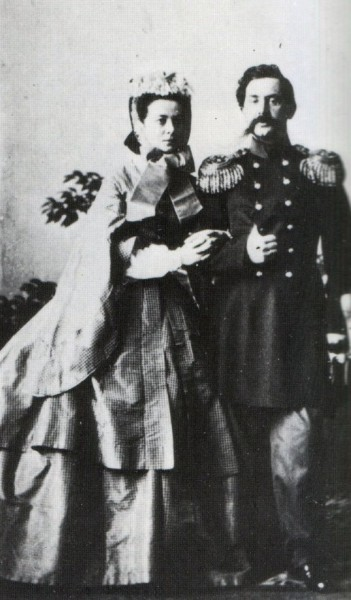
Alexandra and her husband Pytor Albedinskaya

A. V. Markov-Vinogradsky wrote on the end Alexandra's relationship to with the Tsar:

"Princess Alexandra Dolgorukova, with her beautiful appearance, combined a knowledgeable intellect; a nobility devoid of selfish ambitions; and a kind soul. She lived in the palace, and her rooms were not distinguished by luxury. There were no precious gifts from her high admirer. There were only books, prints, and figurines with the inscription: 'From your friend Alexander'. She did not distract the Emperor from affars of state, and he worked hard. She was too proud to derive personal benefit from the Tsar's love. But she enriched her parents by obtaining permission from the Tsar for her father to supply the army in Crimea with canned dried cabbage. This cabbage brought in 600 thousand rubles in profit and saved their ruined fortune. She sincerely loved the Tsar and enjoyed his love for a very long time. Finally, it was time to marry her off, and Prince Albedinsky became her husband. She was proud and almost burst into tears when they gave her to the prince, having first paid off his debts of 200,000 rubles! She almost went blind. Poor thing!"

In 1862, her relationship with the emperor ended. Fyodor Tyutchev wrote to his wife:

"I'll tell you the most exciting news. Alexandra Dolgorukova is getting married! This is a positive thing, announces, official! But the wedding will only be in six months."

On 21 November [O.S. 9 November] 1862, Dolgorukova married the General Pyotr Albedinsky (1826-1883) who was eight years her senior. The wedding took place in St. Petersburg in the Court Church of the Winter Palace, she had no dowry. Historian Irina Gromova wrote:

"Finally, the favourite received a 'complete dismissal', and the courtiers were delighted to savour this fact when the dethroned mistress appeared in the palace church with swollen, red eyes. During the service, she swallowed tears, and everyone who had groveled before her the day before now kept their distance from the unfortunate woman."

Despite the rough start to their relationship, the marriage was quite successful. Due to the marriage, Albedinsky had a successful career. In 1866, he was appointed Governor-General of the Livonia, Estonia, and Courland, and in 1880, Governor-General of Warsaw. Alexandra won the favour of the Polish people despite strong prejudice against Russian dignitaries.

Alexandra and three children with Albedinksy, to whom according to a contemporary, she wasnted to give "the most exemplary education and mercilessly overstrained them... She woke up at six o'clock in the morning and diligently read pedagogical books and magazines, tried to study each of the subjects that were taught to her daughters and son, and all this so that the teaching would be consisten witth her own system, difficult for outsiders to understand." Their children were:

- Maria Petrovna Albedinskaya (1863-1928) - maid of honour, married geologist Fyodor Platonovich Chikhachev (1859 - 1919)
- Olga Petrovna Albedinskaya (1865-1953) - maid of honour, lived in exile in Sweden from 1920, died in Stockholm
- Alexander Petrovich Albedinsky (1868-1959) - Collegiate Councillor

Albedinsky died in Warsaw in 1883 as a result of an unsuccessful lithotomy. Following his death, Alexandra Sergeevna lived in St. Petersburg and received a state pension. In May 1896, during the Coronation of Nicholas II and Alexandra Feodorovna, she was granted the rank of Statsdame and awarded the Order of Saint Catherine, Second Class.

Alexandra Albedinskaya died on 30 August 1913 in Cannes. Her funeral service was held on 15 April 1914 in the embassy church of St. Michael the Archangel, she was buried in the city's Anglican Cimetière du Grand Jas.

== Cultural Depictions ==
- Fyodor Tyutchev dedicated a quatrain to Dolgorukova:

A miracle of pure harmony, mystery, sorrow!
This sweet creation contains no prose.
And the soul plunges into a clear distance,
and vague dreams are born in the heart.

- Smoke by Ivan Turgenev, Dolgororukova was the inspiration for the chararachter Irina
- Fathers and Sons by Ivan Turgenev, Dolgorukova is the basis for the appearance of Anna Sergeevna Odintsova
