= General Dolgorukov =

General Dolgorukov may refer to:

- Mikhail Petrovich Dolgorukov (1780—1808), Imperial Russian Army major general
- Peter Petrovich Dolgorukov (general, born 1744) (1744–1815), Imperial Russian Army infantry general
- Vasily Alexandrovich Dolgorukov (1868–1918), Imperial Russian Army general
- Vasily Vladimirovich Dolgorukov (1667–1746), Imperial Russian Army general
- Vladimir Petrovich Dolgorukov (1773–1817), Imperial Russian Army major general
