= Vasily Dolgorukov =

Vasily Dolgorukov may refer to:

- Vasily Vladimirovich Dolgorukov (1667–1746), Russian military commander and politician
- Vasily Lukich Dolgorukov (1672–1739), Russian diplomat and political minister
- Vasily Andreyevich Dolgorukov (1804–1868), Russian statesman, Minister of War, and head of the Third Section of H.I.M. Chancellery
- Vasily Alexandrovich Dolgorukov (1868–1918), Russian Marshal of the Imperial Court under Tsar Nicholas II

== See also ==
- House of Dolgorukov
