= Peter Petrovich Dolgorukov =

Peter Petrovich Dolgorukov may refer to:

- Peter Petrovich Dolgorukov (general, born 1744) (1744–1815), Russian officer and nobleman
- Peter Petrovich Dolgorukov (general, born 1777) (1777–1806), Russian officer and nobleman, son of the above
