= Natalia Sheremeteva =

Russian writer

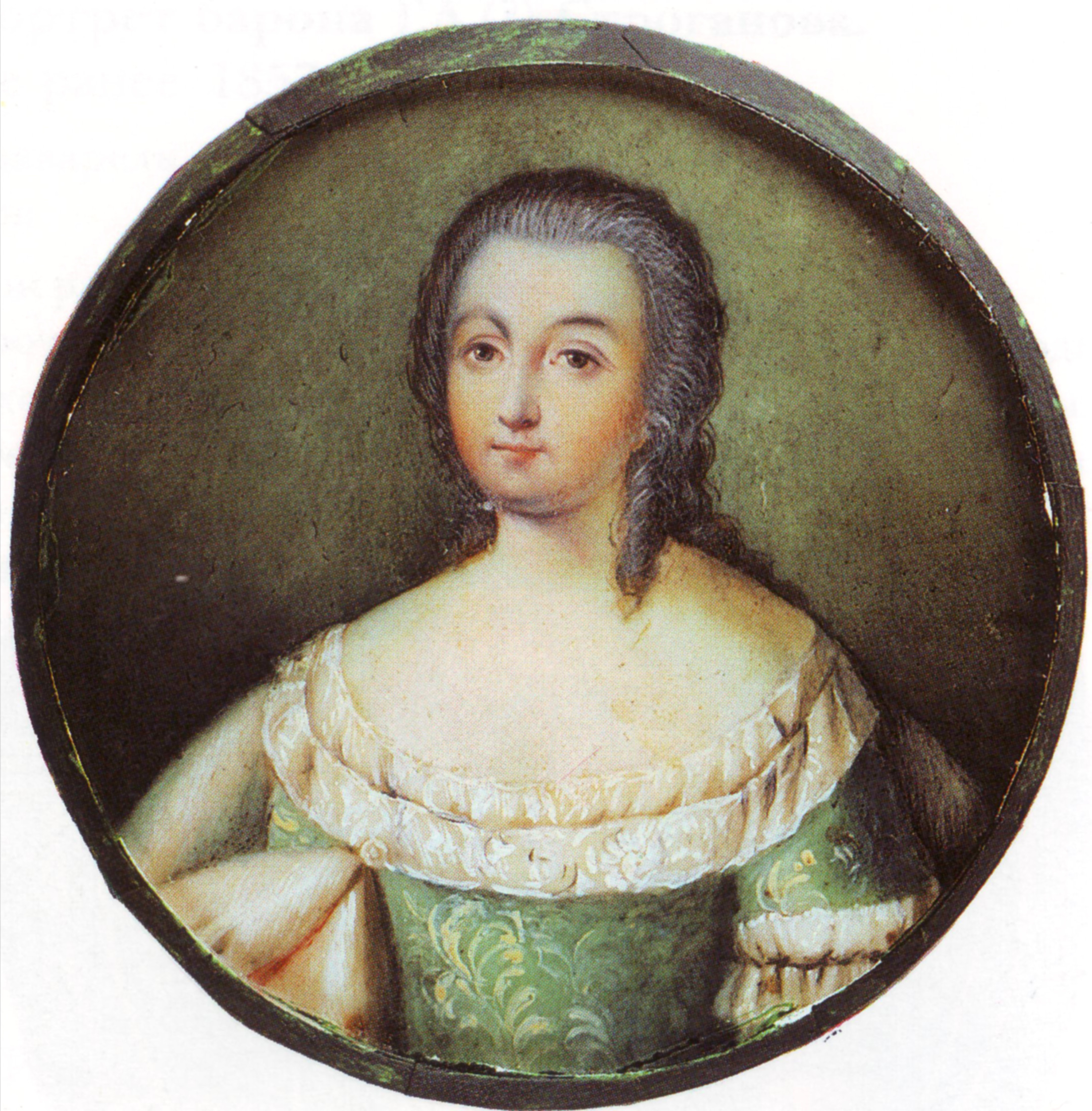
Princess Natalie Dolgorukov

Princess Natalia Borisovna Dolgorukova (née Countess Sheremeteva; Russian: Княгиня Наталья Борисовна Долгорукова, née Графиня Шереметева; 17 January, 1714 – 3 July, 1771) was one of the first Russian women writers. She has been called the most accomplished Russian memoirist of the 18th century.

Natalia's father was Count Boris Sheremetev, Russia's first native field marshal. He died when she was 4. She was betrothed to Prince Ivan Dolgorukov, an intimate friend of the young Peter II of Russia and his brother-in-law. After the Emperor's sudden death, Dolgorukov fell into disgrace, but Natalia did not desert her lover, and insisted on getting married. She was 16 at the time.

Several days after the wedding, the entire Dolgorukov family was exiled to Beryozov, a remote Arctic town. She gave birth to two sons in exile but was allowed to return to Moscow ten years later, after her husband's execution. She took the veil in Florovsky Convent of Kiev, but not before her children had grown up and married. Her short memoir "Handwritten Notes" (Своеручные записки, Svoyeruchnye zapiski) was written shortly before that date. It appeared in print in 1810. Literary historian D. S. Mirsky praised the memoir for the "great simplicity and unpretentious sincerity of the narrative" and its "beautiful, undefiled Russian".

== Bibliography ==
- Segura Graíño, Cristina (1998). Madrid: Espasa-Calpe (ed.). Diccionario de mujeres en la historia. ISBN 84-239-8631-4.
