= Vladimir Dolgorukov =

Vladimir Dolgorukov may refer to:

- Vladimir Timofeyevich Dolgorukov (1569–1633), father of Maria Dolgorukova, wife of Tsar Michael I of Russia
- Vladimir Petrovich Dolgorukov (1773–1817), Russian major general
- Vladimir Andreyevich Dolgorukov (1810–1891), governor-general (mayor) of Moscow from 1865 to 1891

== See also ==
- House of Dolgorukov
