= James Bruce (1732–1791) =

Russian general (1732–1791)

Count James Bruce
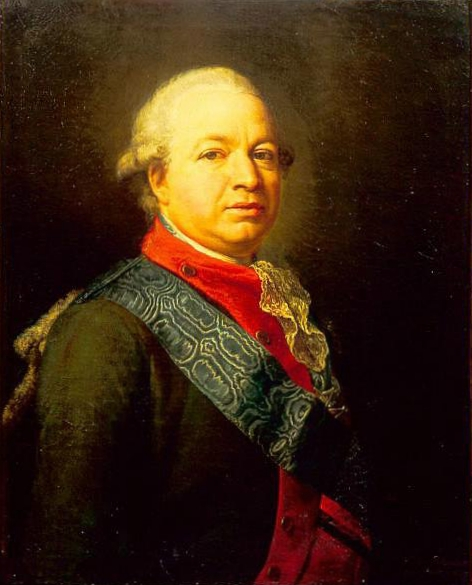
- Portrait by Pompeo Batoni, 1782

Governor-General of Saint Petersburg

Personal details
- Born: 1732
- Died: 30 November 1791 (aged 58–59)
- Spouse: Praskovia Rumiantseva

Military service
- Allegiance: Russia
- Branch/service: Imperial Russian Army
- Rank: General

Count James Bruce (Russian: Я́ков Алекса́ндрович Брюс, romanized: Yakov Aleksandrovich Bryus; 1732 – 30 November 1791) was a Russian general of Scottish origin.

His grandfather was Lieutenant General Robert Bruce, a Scottish immigrant to Russia, and he was also great-nephew of Jacob Bruce. His father was Lieutenant Colonel Count Alexander Bruce, and Ekaterina Alekseyevna Dolgorukova was his stepmother. James Bruce married Praskovia Rumiantseva, sister of General (and later Field Marshal) Pyotr Rumyantsev. Praskovia was a lady-in-waiting and friend of Catherine the Great. These connections greatly helped the career of James Bruce. In 1774, he became Commander of the Finland Division.

Even after Praskovia was banned from the court in 1779, after having had an affair with the Empress' lover, Bruce stayed in favour and received new posts. Bruce first became simultaneously Governor-General of Moscow and Saint Petersburg Governorates between 1784 and 1786, and then of Saint Petersburg only until 1791. He died the same year, without male offspring, and with him ended the line of the Russian counts Bruce. His only daughter Catherine died childless in 1829.

== See also ==
- Scottish Russians

== Sources ==
- "Брюс, Яков Александрович" . Brockhaus and Efron Encyclopedic Dictionary (in Russian). 1906.

Political offices
Preceded by Aleksandr Mikhailovich Golitsyn	Governor-General of Saint Petersburg Governorate; 1784–6 October 1791	Succeeded by Alexander I of Russia
Preceded by	Governor-General of Moscow Governorate; 1784–1786	Succeeded by
