= Alexander Romanovich Bruce =

Russian lieutenant general

- Born: 1708
- Died: 1752 (aged 43–44); Moscow
- Occupation: military personnel

Count Alexander Romanovich Bruce (Russian: Алекса́ндр Рома́нович Брюс, 1704–1760) was a lieutenant general in the Imperial Russian army. He was the son of Robert Bruce (1668–1720), first commandant of St Petersburg, whose brother was Peter the Great's associate Jacob Bruce.

== Life ==
On 7 May 1722 he was appointed to the Engineer Corps and later that year he was sent abroad, only returning to Russia in 1726. He was then made a warrant officer and later a cavalryman, before promotion to captain in 1727. In 1729 he became aide de camp to marshal Vasily Vladimirovich Dolgorukov. He also married Vasily's niece Anastasia Mikhailovna Dolgorukova on 26 July 1729 – their son James Bruce (1732–1791) died without male issue and the Russian Bruce line died out when James' only daughter Catherine died childless in 1829.

Alexander was sent to the Tsaritsyn Line in 1731. During the War of the Polish Succession in 1733, he was put in command of a newly-formed special regiment. In 1736 he fought in the Russo-Turkish War (1735-1739) and was present in Burkhard Christoph von Münnich's Crimean campaign and the battle at the Solyan lake under the command of Lieutenant General Izmailov. On 9 December 1736 Bruce was promoted to colonel and put in command of the Reval Dragoon Regiment and the following year he was present at the siege of Ochakov. He fought in the 1738 Dniester campaign and the 1739 Moldavian campaign, taking part in the capture of Khotin. On 14 February 1740, after the war's end, he was promoted to major general. For a short time from 29 March 1740 he was also vice-governor of Moscow.

At the rank of major general he fought in the Russo-Swedish War (1741–43), during which he was sent to Finland as part of generalissimo James Francis Edward Keith's force, staying there until the end of 1742. His wife died in summer 1745 and in December that year Bruce re-married to Ekaterina Alekseyevna Dolgorukova, another member of the Dolgorukov family and formerly engaged to Peter II of Russia, though she died of a cold shortly after her wedding to Bruce. He then married a third time, to the young Natalia Fedorovna Kolycheva (1730–1777). Alexander retired with the rank of lieutenant general on 25 April 1752. He was also a knight of the Order of Saint Anna. He was buried on his estate at Glinka (now in the town of Losino-Petrovsky) in St John's Church.

== Sources ==
- "Брюс, Александр Романович" . Brockhaus and Efron Encyclopedic Dictionary (in Russian). 1906.
- Сборник биографий кавалергардов. T. 1: 1724-1762. 1901. p. 162.
- Русский Провинциальный Некрополь. Т. 1: Губернии: Архангельская, Владимирская, Вологодская, Костромская, Московская, Новгородская, Олонецкая, Псковская, С. Петербургская, Тверская, Ярославская и Выборгской губернии монастыри Валаамский и Коневский. 1914. p. 104.
