= Peter Petrovich Dolgorukov (general, born 1777) =

Russian general

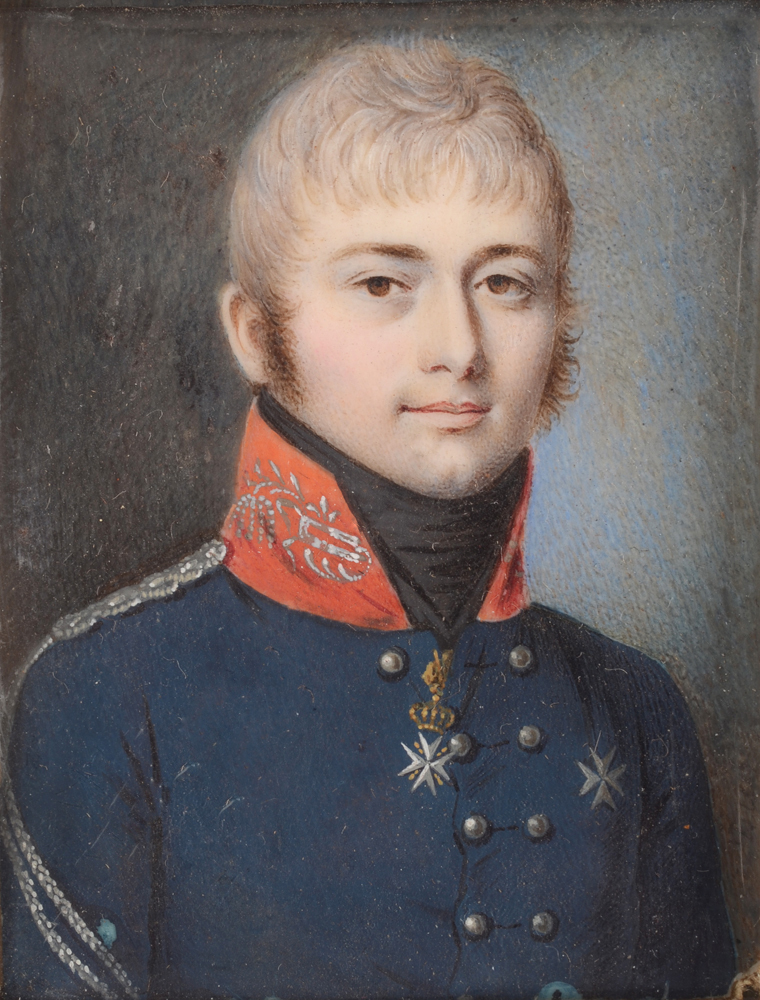
Dolgorukov by Nicolas-François Dun, c.1800

Prince Peter Petrovich Dolgorukov (Russian: Князь Пётр Петрович Долгоруков; 19 December 1777 - 8 December 1806) was a Russian officer and nobleman.

== Life ==
He was the second son of the infantry general Prince Peter Petrovich Dolgorukov (1744-1815) and Princess Anastasia Simonovna (née Lapteva). His mother was an intelligent woman who ensured that Peter and his brothers Vladimir and Mikhail got a good education. He is recorded as being in the Izmailovsky Life Guards Regiment in March 1778 and became a captain in the Moscow Grenadier Regiment in January 1792. In June the following year he was made adjutant to his relation Yuri Vladimirovich Dolgorukov. In November 1795 he transferred to the garrison regiment in Moscow and became a lieutenant colonel, followed by full colonel in May 1797.

He was put in command of the city of Smolensk in September 1798 and promoted to major general. For three months he reformed its judicial system, which had fallen into neglect, and sent the tsar a report on the city's nobility and their devotion to the tsar - this attracted Paul I's attention and he appointed Dolgorukov an adjutant general aged only 21. When Alexander I of Russia came to the throne, he immediately promoted Dolgorukov during the first year of his reign. In 1802 he audited the provinces of Grodno and Vilnius, travelled to Berlin twice to consolidate Russia's friendly relations with the Kingdom of Prussia and managed to avoid a rupture with Sweden on a trip there to resolve disagreements over the Swedish-Russian borders in Finland.

When war broke out with the First French Empire in 1805 he returned to Berlin to try to persuade the Prussian king to act in concert with Russia and the Austrian Empire. Before the battle of Austerlitz Napoleon sent general Anne Jean Marie René Savary to Alexander I to offer a personal meeting between Napoleon and the tsar. Alexander declined to go himself and in his place sent Dolgorukov, who was very much in favour of the war and confident the Russian troops could beat Napoleon. He was received graciously by Napoleon but responded proudly and arrogantly, rejecting all of Napoleon's proposals and presenting his own proposals brusquely. He reported back to Alexander that Napoleon was afraid of fighting the Russian army and insisted on giving battle, contrary to the opinion of Mikhail Kutuzov - Russian officers and noblemen thus later gave Dolgorukov most of the blame for the ensuing defeat. During the battle he was an infantry commander in Prince Pyotr Bagration's corps, showing great courage and repulsing the enemy attacks several times. He was sent back to Berlin on the day after the battle to induce Frederick William III of Prussia to declare war on Napoleon as soon as possible.

In autumn 1806 Alexander instructed Dolgorukov to inspect the army gathered in southern Russia ready for the Russo-Turkish War (1806–1812), but before he had completed his inspection he received orders to come to St Petersburg immediately to discuss the Russian response to the Prussian defeat at Jena–Auerstedt. He galloped to St Petersburg so quickly that several times he overtook his own adjutants and he arrived tired and broken. Alexander received him immediately and had a long meeting with him, but that same evening Dolgorukov fell ill and was put up in a room in the Winter Palace. The doctors diagnosed typhoid fever but could do nothing for him and he died a week later.

== Sources ==
- https://ru.wikisource.org/wiki/%D0%AD%D0%A1%D0%91%D0%95/%D0%94%D0%BE%D0%BB%D0%B3%D0%BE%D1%80%D1%83%D0%BA%D0%BE%D0%B2%D1%8B_%D0%B8_%D0%94%D0%BE%D0%BB%D0%B3%D0%BE%D1%80%D1%83%D0%BA%D0%B8%D0%B5
- https://ru.wikisource.org/wiki/%D0%A0%D0%91%D0%A1/%D0%92%D0%A2/%D0%94%D0%BE%D0%BB%D0%B3%D0%BE%D1%80%D1%83%D0%BA%D0%BE%D0%B2,_%D0%9F%D0%B5%D1%82%D1%80_%D0%9F%D0%B5%D1%82%D1%80%D0%BE%D0%B2%D0%B8%D1%87_(1777%E2%80%941806)
