= Alexey Grigoryevich Dolgorukov =

Russian politician (died 1734)

Alexey Grigoryevich Dolgorukov (Russian: Алексей Григорьевич Долгоруков; died 1734 in Beryozov) was a Russian politician and member of the Supreme Privy Council under Peter II. He is a cousin of Vasily Lukich Dolgorukov.

== Biography ==
Dolgorukov's birth date is unknown. From 1700 to 1706 he lived in Warsaw and travelled to Italy.

The nobility of his father, Grigory Fyodorovich, and uncle Yakov Fyodorovich, made it quite easy for Alexey to work on different services. In 1713, he became governor of Smolensk, in 1723, he became president of the Main Municipality and in 1726, after an appeal by Alexander Danilovich Menshikov, was named senator and hofmeister by Catherine I. Dolgorukov was the second educator of Grand Duke Peter Alexeyevich Romanov.

In 1729, together with his family member Vasily Vladimirovich Dolgorukov they arrested and exiled their rival Alexander Danilovich Menshikov. Under Peter II, Dolgorukov became a member of the Supreme Privy Council.

He tried to recover Peter II's rule while being against Menshikov. Finally, latter was exiled in Beryozov of the Tobolsk Governorate.

As he endeavoured to go by Peter II, he distracted him from work, encouraging him in chases and other enjoyments. He often sent him to his manor in the region behind Moscow in Gorenky, where only family members of the Dolgorukovs were near him. Here the 14-year-old Emperor met with one of Alexey's daughters, Ekaterina, who became engaged with Peter II.

After the death of Peter II, he was the only member of the Supreme Privy Council who protested against the accession of Anna, leading him and his family being exiled to Beryozov, where he died in 1734.

== Personal life ==
His father, Grigory Fyodorovich (1657 – 1723), was house stolnik of Peter I. His wife, Praskovya Yuryevna Khilkova, was the daughter of Yuri Yakovlevich Khilkov (1682 – 1730) and Yevdokia Petrovna Neledinskaya. Alexey's children were:

- Ivan (1708 – 1739): favorite of Emperor Peter II, executed. From 1730 was in marriage with countess Natalya Borisovna Sheremetyeva;
- Ekaterina (1712 – 1747): fiancée of Emperor Peter II. From 1745 wife of count Alexander Romanovich Bryus (Bruce);
- Nikolay (1713 – 1790): in first marriage with Natalya Sergeyevna Golitsyna (1715 – 1755), in second marriage with Anna Aleksandrovna Bredikhina (1733 – 1808);
- Elena (1715 – 1799): in marriage with knyaz Yuri Yuryevich Dolgorukov (died 1746);
- Anna (died 1758);
- Alexey (1716 – 1792): in first marriage with Yevdokia Grigoryevna Myshetskova from 1756 (died 1760). Perhaps there were two more marriages. Son: Grigory Alekseyevich Dolgorukov;
- Alexander (1717 – 1782): in marriage with Praskovya Kirillovna Matyushkina (1722 – 1760).

== Bibliography ==
- Massie, Robert K. (2022-05-12). Peter the Great. Apollo. ISBN 978-1-80110-277-3.
- "Долгоруковы и Долгорукие". Brockhaus and Efron Encyclopedic Dictionary: In 86 Volumes (82 Volumes and 4 Additional Volumes) (in Russian). St. Petersburg: F. A. Brockhaus. 1890–1907.
