= House of Dolgorukov =

Russian noble family

Dolgorukov
- Princely arms as of 1798
- Origin: Obolensk

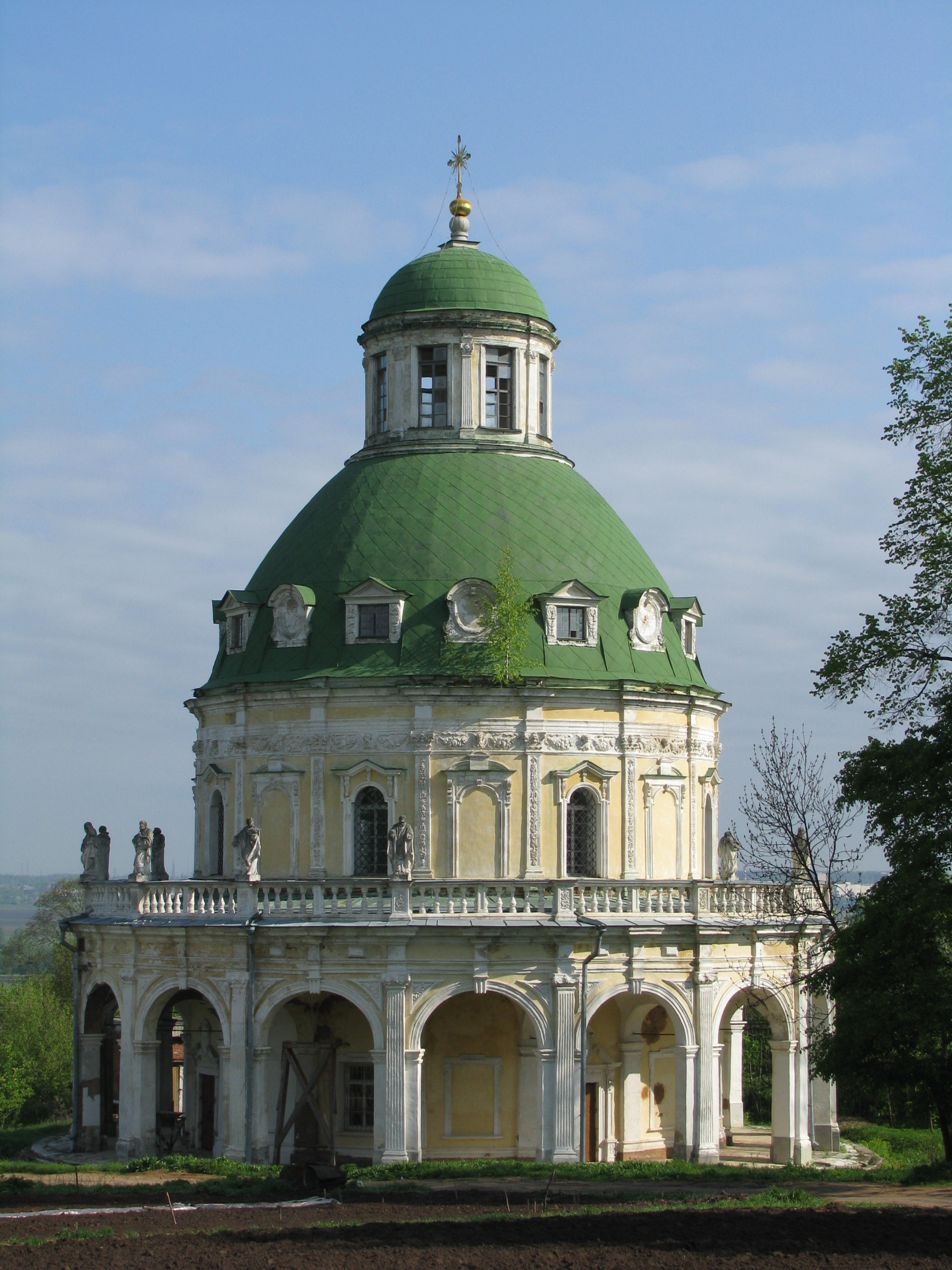
A church in the Dolgorukov family manor of Podmoklovo, 1714–22.

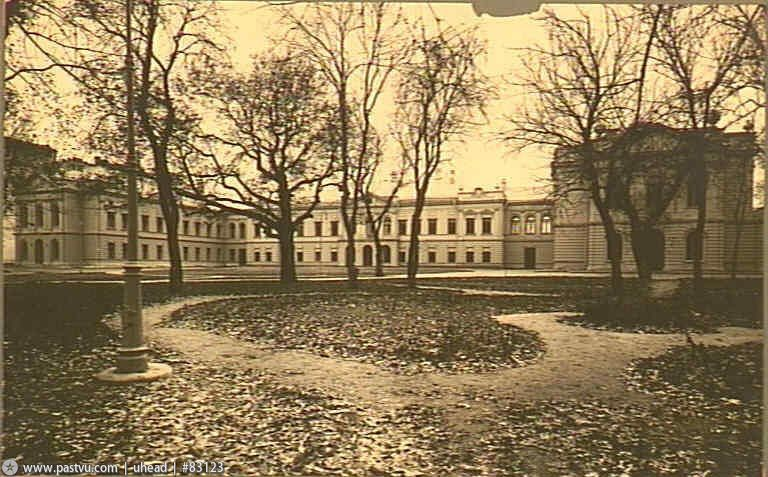
Vyazemskiy-Dolgorukiy estate (Znamenskiy lane) 3

The House of Dolgorukov (Russian: Долгору́ков, IPA: [dəlɡɐˈrukəf])(Dolgoruky) is a princely Russian family of Rurikid stock. They are a cadet branch of the Obolenskiy family (until 1494 the rulers of Obolensk, one of the Upper Oka Principalities) and as such claiming patrilineal descent from Mikhail of Chernigov (d. 1246).

The founder of the Dolgorukov branch of the Obolenskiy is Prince Ivan Andreevich Obolenskiy (15th century), who for his vengefulness was given the nickname of Долгорукий (Dolgorukiy/Dolgoruky), i.e. "far-reaching". Obolensk was incorporated into the expanding Grand Duchy of Moscow in 1494, and the house of Dolgorukov became a powerful noble family in Tsardom of Russia and the Russian Empire.

== List of members ==
Members of the House of Dolgorukov include:

- Maria Dolgorukaya (d. 1580), a wife of Ivan IV
- Grigori Ivanovich Menshoi Chyort ("the Devil") Dolgorukov (Князь Григорий Иванович Меньшой Чёрт Долгоруков), died after 1598, governor under Ivan the Terrible.
- Aleksey Grigorevich Chertyonok ("Little Devil") Dolgorukov (Князь Алексей Григорьевич Чертёнок Долгоруков), died 1646.
- Maria Dolgorukova (d. 1625), first wife of Michael I
- Yuri Alexeyevich Dolgorukov (near 1610–1682), military leader known for victories during the Russo-Polish war, boyar (1648). Killed during the Moscow uprising of 1682.
- Yuri Vladimirovich Dolgorukov (1664–1707), Russian colonel, killed at the start of Bulavin Rebellion
- Yakov Fyodorovich Dolgorukov (1639–1720), Russian diplomat, senator and senior official of Peter the Great
- Vasily Vladimirovich Dolgorukov (1667–1746), Russian soldier and Field Marshal
- Vasily Lukich Dolgorukov (1672–1739), Russian diplomat and minister, including ambassador to Copenhagen
- Alexey Grigoryevich Dolgorukov (died 1734), cousin of Vasily Lukich, father of Ekaterina Alekseyevna
- Vladimir Petrovich Dolgorukov (1696–1761), Russian General Governor of Livonia and Estonia
- Ekaterina Alekseyevna Dolgorukova (1712–1747), betrothed to Emperor Peter II of Russia
- Alexey Grigoryevich Dolgorukov (d.1734), Governor of Smolensk and member of the Supreme Privy Council
- Vasily Mikhailovich Dolgorukov-Krymsky (1722–1782), Russian general and governor of Moscow
- Yuri Vladimirovich Dolgorukov (1740–1830), Russian general-in-chief, author of valuable memoirs
- Mikhail Petrovich Dolgorukov (1780–1808), Russian colonel
- Helene Pavlovna Dolgorukova (1790–1860), grandmother of Helena Blavatsky and Sergei Witte
- Dimitri Ivanovich Dolgorukov (1797–1867), career diplomat
- Vasily Andreyevich Dolgorukov (1804–1868), Russian minister of war
- Pyotr Vladimirovich Dolgorukov (1816–1868), Russian nobleman and historian
- Helena Blavatsky (1831–1891), occultist, spirit medium and author who co-founded the Theosophical Society
- Vladimir Andreyevich Dolgorukov governor-general (mayor) of Moscow from 1865 to 1891
- Catherine Dolgorukova (1847–1922), morganatic wife of Alexander II of Russia
- Pavel Dolgorukov (1866–1927), prominent liberal politician prior to 1917
- Pyotr Dmitriyevich Dolgorukov (1866–1951), Russian liberal politician
- Vasily Alexandrovich Dolgorukov (1868–1918), Court Marshal and military adjutant to Nicholas II
- Princess Olga Dolgorouky (1915-1998), Russian socialite and British Viscountess

== See also ==
- Yuri Dolgorukiy

== Bibliography ==
- Massie, Robert K. (2022-05-12). Peter the Great. Apollo. ISBN 978-1-80110-277-3.
