= Beryozovo, Khanty-Mansi Autonomous Okrug =

Beryozovo Берёзово Ха̄льӯс, Ха̄льпӯс (Mansi)
- Urban-type settlement
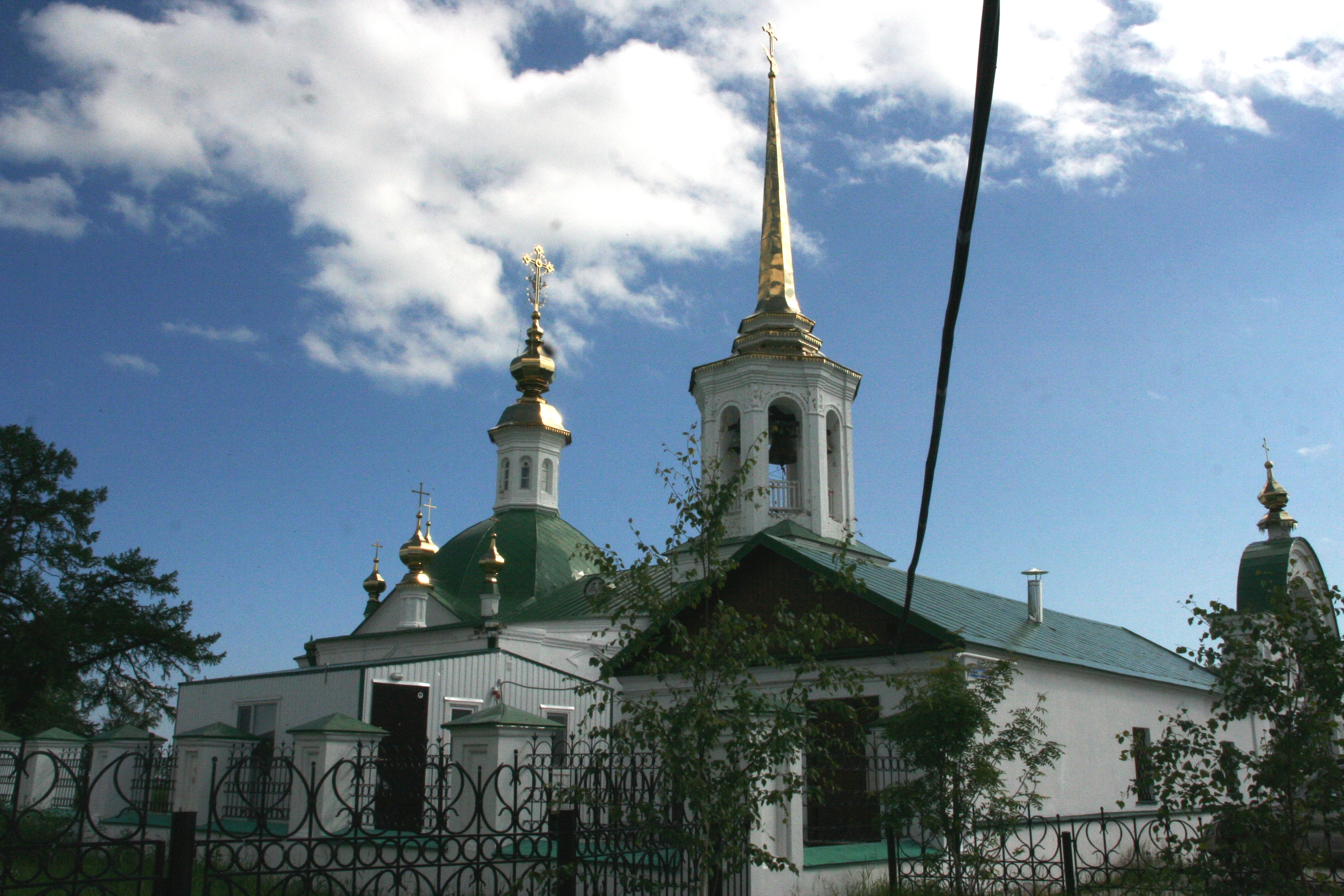
- The Church of the Nativity of the Blessed Virgin

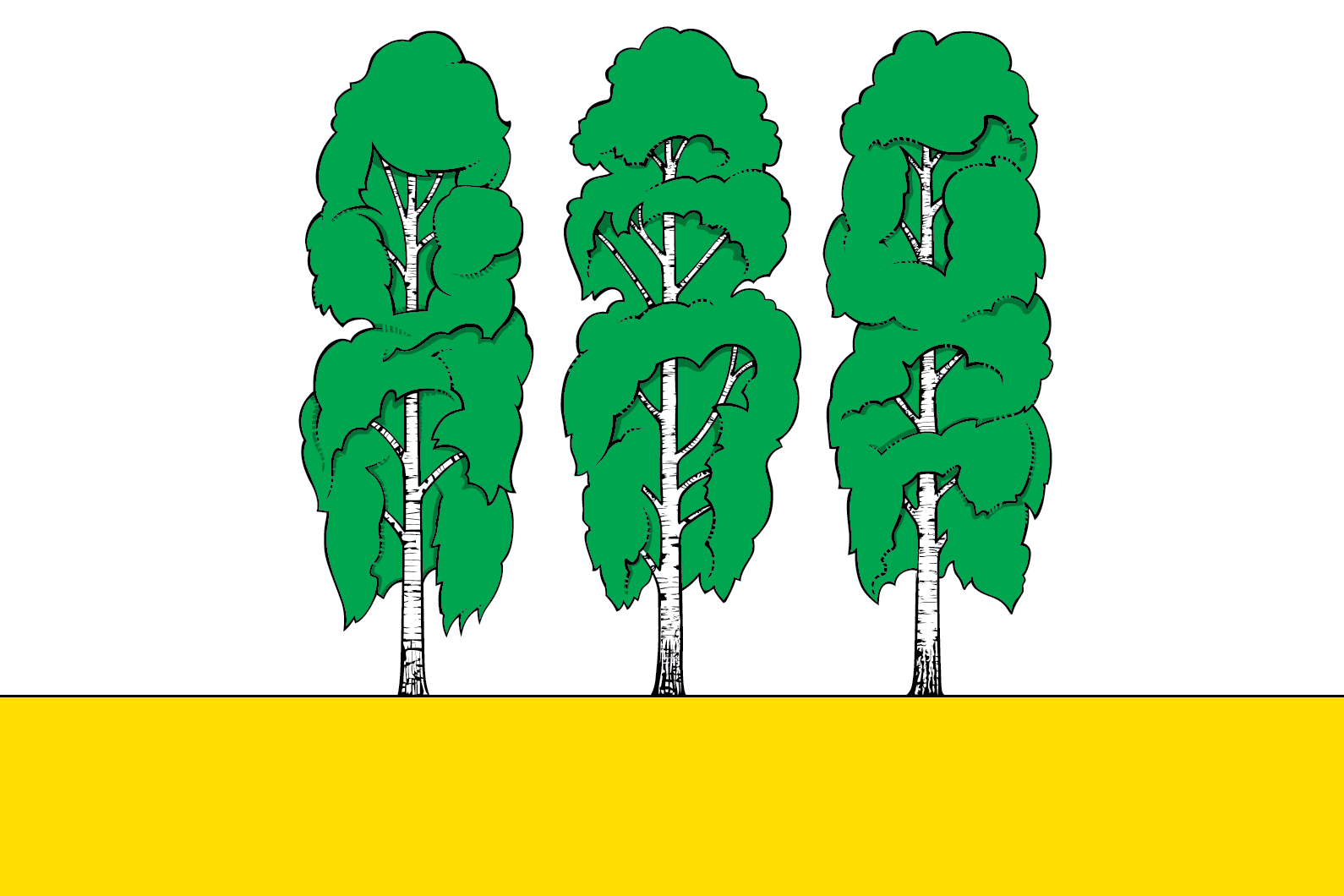
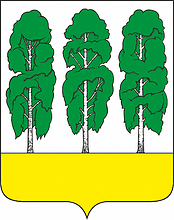
- Flag Coat of arms
- Interactive map of Beryozovo
- Location of Beryozovo Beryozovo (Khanty–Mansi Autonomous Okrug)
- Coordinates: 63°56′04″N 65°02′40″E
- Country: Russia
- Federal subject: Khanty-Mansi Autonomous Okrug
- Administrative district: Beryozovsky District
- Founded: 1593

Population (2010 Census)
  - Total: 7,287
  - Estimate (2021): 6,411 (−12%)
- Time zone: UTC+5 (MSK+2)
- Postal code: 628140
- OKTMO ID: 71812151051

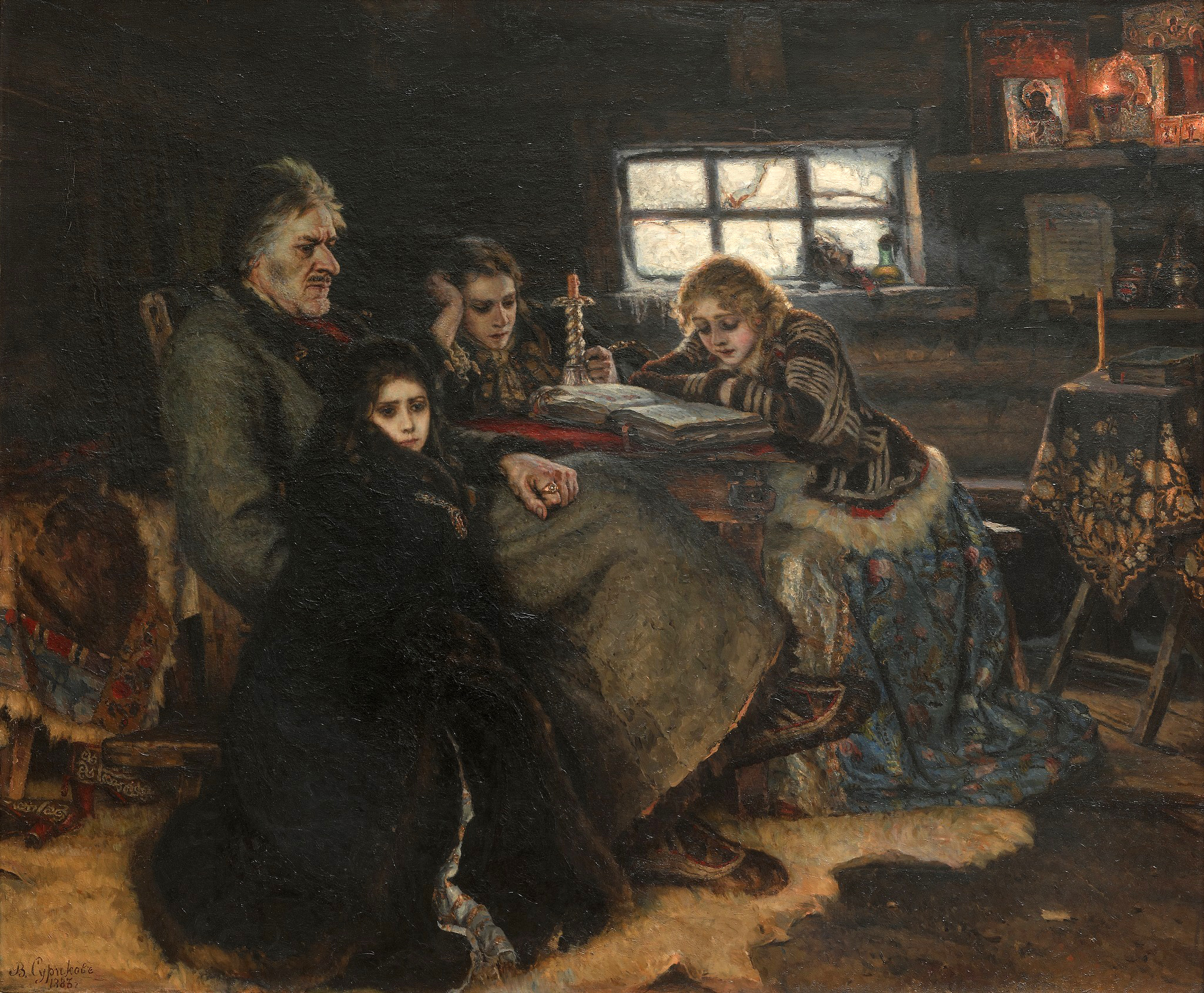
Menshikov and His Family in Beryozov, by Vasily Surikov

Beryozovo (Russian: Берёзово; Khanty: Сўмт вош, Sŭmt-voš; Mansi: Ха̄льӯс, Hāļūs) is an urban locality (an urban-type settlement) and the administrative center of Beryozovsky District of Khanty-Mansi Autonomous Okrug, Russia, located on the Ob River. Population: 7,287 (2010 census); 7,085 (2002 census); 7,573 (1989 Soviet census).

== Geography ==
It is situated on three hills on the left bank of the Severnaya Sosva River, at its junction with the Ob River. It has more than once suffered from conflagrations, including fires in 1719 and 1808. The yearly mean temperature is +4 °C (39 °F), with the low being −44 °C (−47 °F).

== History ==
Some ill-documented Russian trade took place in the area before the Russian conquest of Siberia. Beryozovo was founded in 1593 on the Severnaya Sosva route across the Ural Mountains to the fur-rich Mangazeya region. Ostyaks besieged the settlement in 1592, 1607, and 1608. It grew into a town of Beryozov (Берёзов) in Tobolsk Governorate. By the late 17th century most trade had shifted south to Verkhoturye.

Prince Menshikov, the favorite of Peter the Great and of Catherine I, died here in exile in 1729. In 1730 Menshikov's enemy and rival, Alexey Grigoryevich Dolgorukov, was interned here with his family.

On 9 April 1740 the St. Petersburg-based French astronomer Joseph-Nicolas Delisle arrived in Beryozovo with the intention of observing the transit of Mercury due to take place on 22 April – but cloudy weather thwarted his plan. In his account of his expedition, Delisle mentions the name of the incumbent governor of Beryozovo: Fyodor Ivanov Schulginoff (Shulginov). During his sojourn in Beryozovo, where he lodged in the house of the hetman of the Cossacks ("la maison la plus distinguée de la Ville"), Delisle visited the church founded by Menschikoff (Menshikov), where the prince was subsequently buried. The town has a cathedral, near which lie buried Mary Menshikova (1711-1729, a daughter of Aleksandr Menshikov, who attempted to betroth her to tsar Peter II) and some of the Dolgorukovs.

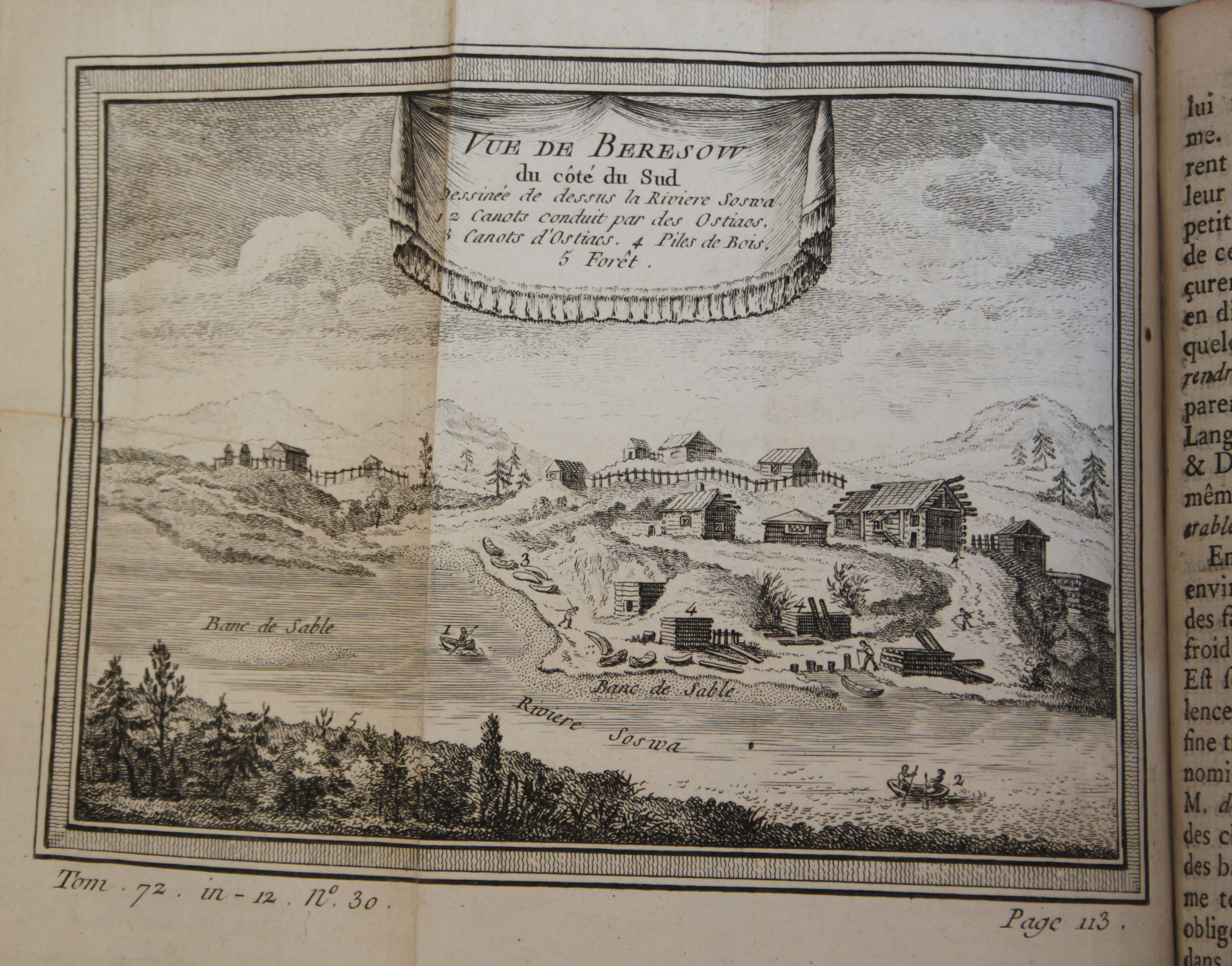
View of Beryozovo from the south, showing Ostyak canoes, mid-18th century, from Continuation de l'histoire générale des voyages, vol. 72, 1768

In 1742 the Empress Yelizaveta Petrovna banished General Ostermann to Beryozov with his wife; he died there in 1747.

In the mid-18th century, gold was discovered at Beryozovo – Siberia's first important gold mine. Serfs and convicts worked the mine under primitive conditions and produced about 400 ounces a year (by the mid-19th century the gold sands further east were producing 600,000 ounces per year). In the 1960s, gas fields were discovered near its lower course, causing major population growth in the area. Transport is by river boat or by ice road.

After 1825, Beryozovo became a place of exile for many of the Decembrists. In the 20th century, the Tsarist regime also banished a number of revolutionaries to the area.

In 1907, on his way to exile in Obdorsk, Leon Trotsky escaped from Beryozovo on 12/13 February. It had taken him 33 days by train and horse to travel from St Petersburg. He mentions the exiling of Prince Menshikov.

== Climate ==
Climate data for Beryozovo (extremes 1834-present)
Month	Jan	Feb	Mar	Apr	May	Jun	Jul	Aug	Sep	Oct	Nov	Dec	Year
Record high °C (°F)	2.0 (35.6)	5.0 (41.0)	13.4 (56.1)	23.7 (74.7)	31.5 (88.7)	33.2 (91.8)	33.6 (92.5)	32.6 (90.7)	26.0 (78.8)	19.6 (67.3)	8.1 (46.6)	2.6 (36.7)	33.6 (92.5)
Mean daily maximum °C (°F)	−17.3 (0.9)	−14.6 (5.7)	−4.7 (23.5)	2.3 (36.1)	10.3 (50.5)	18.2 (64.8)	21.8 (71.2)	17.4 (63.3)	10.9 (51.6)	2.0 (35.6)	−9.3 (15.3)	−14.6 (5.7)	1.9 (35.4)
Daily mean °C (°F)	−21.3 (−6.3)	−19.0 (−2.2)	−10.1 (13.8)	−2.9 (26.8)	5.0 (41.0)	13.1 (55.6)	16.7 (62.1)	12.7 (54.9)	6.7 (44.1)	−1.2 (29.8)	−12.8 (9.0)	−18.4 (−1.1)	−2.6 (27.3)
Mean daily minimum °C (°F)	−25.7 (−14.3)	−23.9 (−11.0)	−15.6 (3.9)	−8.1 (17.4)	0.0 (32.0)	7.9 (46.2)	11.3 (52.3)	8.1 (46.6)	2.9 (37.2)	−4.4 (24.1)	−16.8 (1.8)	−22.7 (−8.9)	−7.2 (18.9)
Record low °C (°F)	−52.8 (−63.0)	−50.7 (−59.3)	−43.6 (−46.5)	−35.8 (−32.4)	−25.2 (−13.4)	−5.8 (21.6)	−0.7 (30.7)	−3.4 (25.9)	−15.4 (4.3)	−31.4 (−24.5)	−46.2 (−51.2)	−48.2 (−54.8)	−52.8 (−63.0)
Average precipitation mm (inches)	26.7 (1.05)	24.6 (0.97)	28.3 (1.11)	38.3 (1.51)	42.0 (1.65)	64.2 (2.53)	69.3 (2.73)	67.8 (2.67)	52.6 (2.07)	53.8 (2.12)	35.4 (1.39)	27.2 (1.07)	530.2 (20.87)
Source: Pogoda.ru.net
