= Praskovya Bruce =

Russian lady-in-waiting and noblewoman (1729–1785)

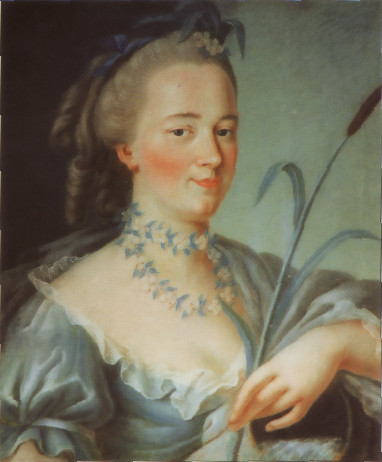
- Portrait, c. 1756
- Born: 1729
- Died: 1785 (aged 55–56)
- Spouse: Count James Bruce
- Occupation: Lady-in-waiting

Countess Praskovya Aleksandrovna Bruce (Russian: Праско́вья Алекса́ндровна Брюс; née Rumyantseva, Russian: Румя́нцева; 1729–1785) was a Russian lady-in-waiting and noblewoman who was a confidante of Catherine the Great.

== Life ==
Countess Praskovya Aleksandrovna Rumyantseva was born into the noble Rumyantsev family. She was the sister of Marshal Count Pyotr Rumyantsev and married to Count James Bruce, governor of Saint Petersburg.

She became the lady-in-waiting of Catherine soon after Catherine's arrival in Russia in 1744 and continued in that position after Catherine's elevation to the throne in 1762. Bruce was described as an attractive woman and as the "right hand" of Catherine. Bruce was called "Brussja" by Catherine, who entrusted her with her most intimate personal affairs. Catherine said that Bruce was "the person to whom I can say everything, without fear of the consequences". Bruce was described as Catherine's closest confidante in her private affairs.

Bruce is best known in history as l'éprouveuse for the role that she allegedly played in Catherine's love life. According to legend, Bruce would "test" any prospective lovers sexually before they became the lovers of Catherine after they had been suggested by Grigory Potemkin, chosen by Catherine and examined by a doctor. The same role has been attributed to Bruce's successor as lady-in-waiting, Anna Protasova. That is unconfirmed, and it is unknown how much truth there is, despite that being a well-reported story.

Bruce played an important role in developing the relationship between Catherine and Potemkin, notably as a messenger, and played that role until the relationship was consummated in 1773. Bruce was then given the task of persuading Potemkin to leave his exile and enter a relationship with Catherine.

In 1779, Catherine was directed into a room, where she witnessed her latest lover, Ivan Rimsky-Korsakov, having sex with Bruce. The person who directed her is believed to have been Aleksandra von Engelhardt, on the order of Potemkin, who wished for the removal of both Korsakov and Bruce from court. That resulted in the fall of both Korsakov and Bruce. Korsakov was sent in exile to Moscow. Bruce soon followed him, but their relationship soon ended.

She returned to her spouse and was dismissed as a lady-in-waiting and replaced by Anna Protasova (1745–1826), the cousin of Alexej Orlov, who is mentioned as l'éprouveuse in the poems of Lord Byron.

== Portrayal ==
Bruce was played by Agnès Soral in the 1995 TV movie Catherine the Great and Gina McKee in the 2019 TV miniseries Catherine the Great.

== See also ==
- Maria Choglokova

== Sources ==
- Simon Sebag-Montefiore : Potemkin och Katarina den stora (2005)
- Marie Tetzlaff : Katarina den stora (1998)
