= Nicolas-François Dun =

French painter (1764–1832)

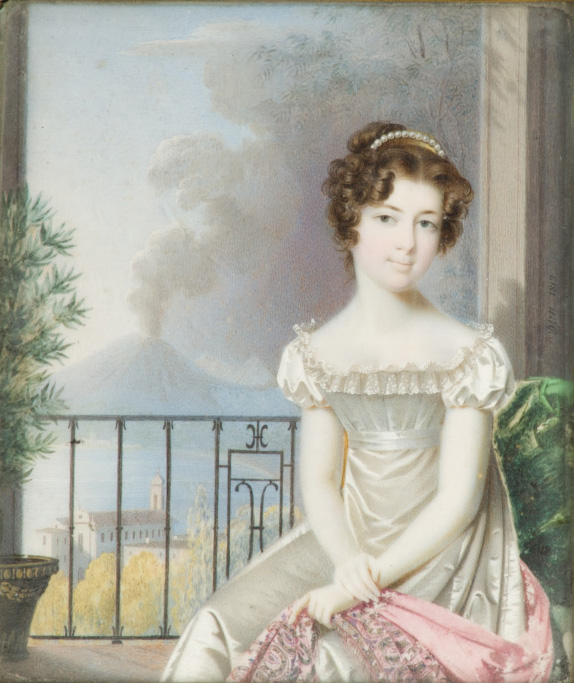
Mary Anne Acton, Lady Acton by Nicolas François Dun

Nicolas François Dun (1764–1832) was a French portrait miniature painter born in Lunéville.

There are two works by Dun at the Louvre Museum.
