= Ekaterina Alekseyevna Dolgorukova =

Russian noble

Ekaterina Dolgorukova
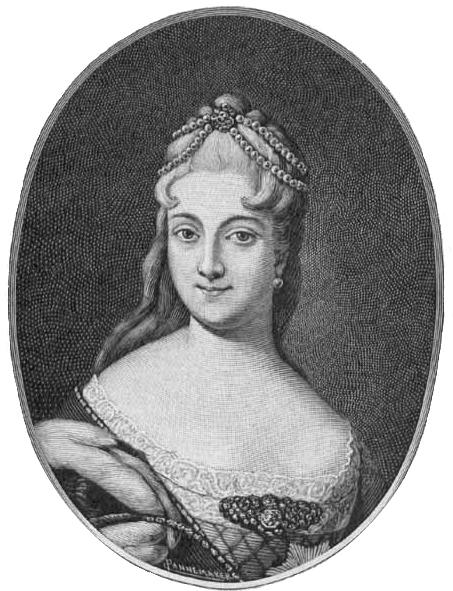
- Born: Princess Ekaterina Alekseyevna Dolgorukova; 1712; Gorenki, near Moscow
- Died: 1747 (aged 34–35)
- Noble family: Dolgorukov
- Spouse: Alexander Romanovich Bruce
- Father: Alexey Grigoryevich Dolgorukov
- Mother: Praskovya Yuryevna Khilkova

Princess Ekaterina Alekseyevna Dolgorukova (Russian: Екатери́на Алексе́евна Долгору́кова; 1712–1747) was a Russian noble, engaged to Tsar Peter II of Russia.

== Biography ==
She was the daughter of the Russian Prince Alexei Dolgorukov and niece to Prince Vasily Lukich Dolgorukov.
She grew up with her brother Ivan in Warsaw in the house of her grandfather Gregory Fjodorovitj. Reportedly, she and the Austrian ambassador Melissimo were in love with each other. On 19 November 1729, she was officially engaged to the Tsar, given the title "Her Highness the Bride Empress", and installed the day after in the Golovinskii Palace. Melissimo was exiled.

The wedding never took place because of Peter's death in 1730. Her family, the Dolgorukovs, tried to install her as ruling Empress in the manner of Catherine I of Russia but did not succeed. She left the palace, and at the installment of Empress Anna Ivanovna, she was deported with her family to Beryozov.

In 1740, she was placed in the convent of Tomsk. In 1741, she was freed by Empress Elizabeth of Russia and appointed lady-in-waiting. In 1745, she married Lieutenant General Count Alexander Romanovich Bruce, son of Robert Bruce (1668–1720). She died of a cold in 1747.
