= Pyotr Dolgorukov (historian) =

Russian historian and journalist

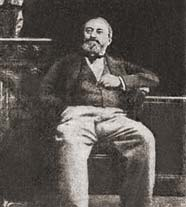

Prince Pyotr Vladimirovich Dolgorukov (Russian: Князь Пётр Владимирович Долгоруков) (1816–1868) was a Russian historian and journalist known for his genealogical research and as a critic of the Imperial Russian government. His father was the general Vladimir Petrovich Dolgorukov.

== Life ==
Dolgorukov was known for his anti-government publications. He moved to Paris in 1859 and refused to return to Russia.

As a result, he was deprived by the authorities of all titles and property and declared a permanent exile. After Dolgorukov's death, his archives were acquired by the Russian government.

Some of Dolgorukov's chief works include:

- "Российский родословный сборник" (“Russian Genealogical Collection”; St. Petersburg, 1840–41),
- "Сведения о роде князей Долгоруковых" (“Accounts about the Princely House of Dolgorukov”, 1842),
- Notices sur les principales familles de la Russie, par le c-te Almagro (Paris, 1842),
- "Российская родословная книга" (“Russian Genealogical Book”, 1855–57),
- La vérité sur la Russie (Paris, 1860),
- "De la question du servage en Russie" (Paris, 1860),
- "Le general Ermolow" (1861),
- "Des reformes en Russie, suivi d'un aperçu sur les états généraux russes au XVI et au XVII s." (1862),
- "Михаил Николаевич Муравьев" (“Mikhail Nikolayevich Muravyov”; St. Petersburg, 1864),
- "Memoires" (Geneva-Basel, 1867–71).
