= Vladimir Petrovich Dolgorukov =

Russian general (1773–1817)

Prince Vladimir Petrovich Dolgorukov (Russian: Князь Влади́мир Петро́вич Долгору́ков; 19 April 1773 – 24 November 1817) was a Russian army officer who rose to the rank of major general. He was the eldest of the three sons born to the general Prince Peter Petrovich Dolgorukov (Vladimir's younger brothers Peter and Mikhail were also generals), whilst his own son was the historian and journalist Pyotr Vladimirovich Dolgorukov.
