= Vasily Lukich Dolgorukov =

Russian diplomat

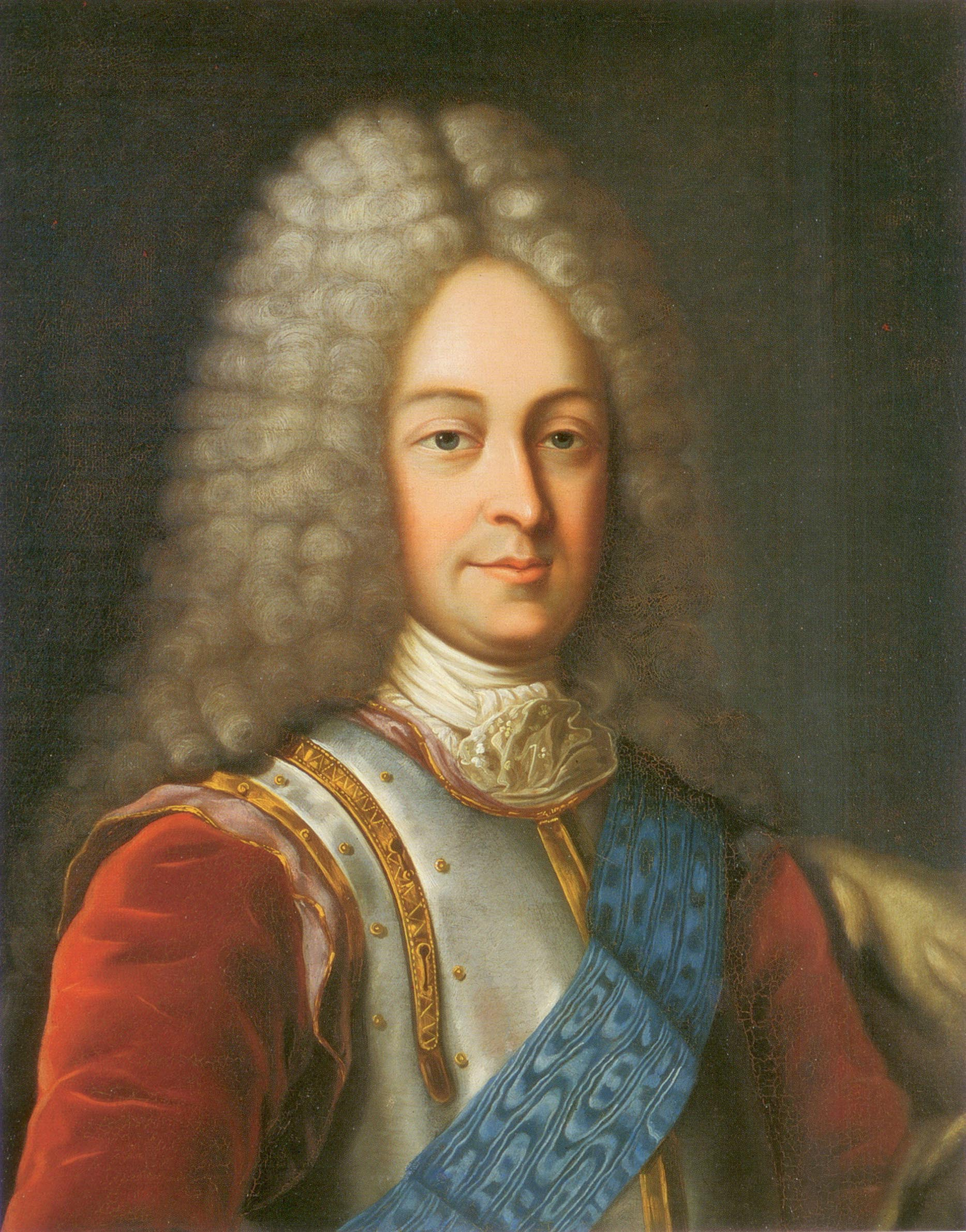
Prince Vasily Lukich Dolgorukov

Prince Vasiliy Lukich Dolgorukov (Russian: Василий Лукич Долгоруков; 1672 8 November 1739) was a Russian diplomat and political minister. He served Peter the Great's government and was the most powerful man in the country in the later years of Peter II's reign.

== Early life ==
A male-line descendant of the legendary prince Rurik, Dolgorukov was one of the first batch of young Russians whom Peter the Great sent abroad to be educated. From 1687 to 1700 he resided in Paris, where he learned thoroughly the principal European languages, acquired the superficial elegance of the court of Versailles, and associated with the Jesuits, whose moral system he is said to have appropriated. He began his diplomatic career as his uncle Yakov Fyodorovich's aide. He also accompanied another uncle Grigory Fyodorovich on a mission to Poland.

On his return home he entered the diplomatic service and served in the military. From 1706 to 1707 he represented Russia in Poland at Warsaw. From 1708 to 1720 he was appointed minister in Copenhagen. He was given extensive ability to negotiate an alliance with the Danish. There, he succeeded in persuading King Frederick IV to join the second coalition against Charles XII in the Treaty of Copenhagen (1709). At the end of 1720 he was transferred to Versailles, in order to seek the mediation of France in the projected negotiations with Sweden and obtain the recognition of Peter's imperial title by the French court. In 1724 he represented Russia in Warsaw and in 1726 in Stockholm, the object of the latter mission being to detach Sweden from the Hanoverian alliance, in which he did not succeed.

== Later life under Peter II and Queen Anna of Russia ==
During the reign of Peter II, Dolgorukov was appointed a member of the Supreme Privy Council. After procuring the banishment of Menshikov he drew up a letter purporting to be the last will of the emperor, appointing Catherine Dolgorukova his successor, but shortly afterwards abandoned the nefarious scheme as impracticable, and was one of the first to support the election of Anne of Courland to the throne on condition that she first signed nine "articles of limitation", which left the supreme power in the hands of the Russian council.

Anne, who repudiated the "articles" on the first opportunity, never forgave Dolgorukov for this. He was deprived of all his offices and dignities on April 17, 1730, and banished first to his country seat and then to the Solovetsky Monastery. Nine years later the charge of forging the will of Peter II was revived against him, and he was tortured and then beheaded in Novgorod on November 8, 1739.

== Bibliography ==
- Massie, Robert K. (2022-05-12). Peter the Great. Apollo. ISBN 978-1-80110-277-3.
