= Peter Petrovich Dolgorukov (general, born 1744) =

Russian infantry general

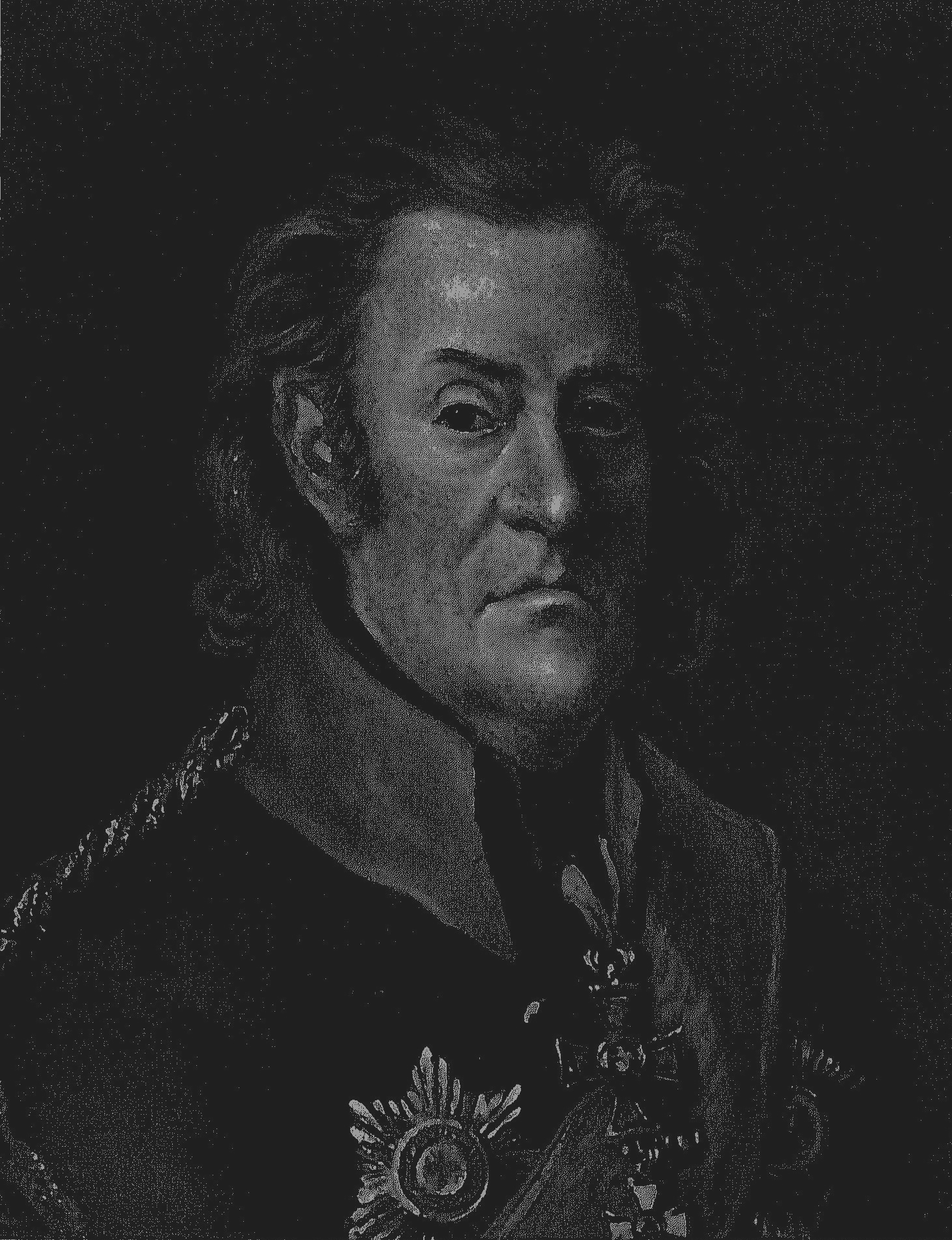
Peter Petrovich Dolgorukov

Prince Peter Petrovich Dolgorukov (Russian: Князь Пётр Петрович Долгоруков, romanized: Knyaz Pyotr Petrovič Dolgorukov; 1744–1815) was a Russian infantry general. He served as governor of Kaluga and Moscow and commanded the Tula Arms Plant. He was the aide-de-camp of Alexander I as a young soldier. His three sons Vladimir, Peter and Mikhail were also all generals.

During the Orlov revolt, he led the failed siege of Modon.
