= Mikhail Petrovich Dolgorukov =

Russian prince and general (1780-1808)

Prince Mikhail Petrovich Dolgorukov
- Михаил Петрович Долгоруков
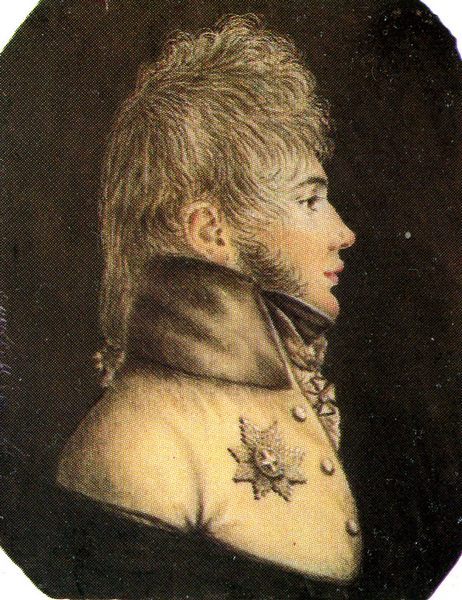
- Portrait of Prince Mikhail Petrovich Dolgorukov
- Born: November 18, 1780; Russian Empire
- Died: October 27, 1808 (aged 27); Near Iisalmi, Finland (then part of Sweden)
- Cause of death: Killed in action (cannonball)
- Relatives: Peter Petrovich Dolgorukov (father); House of Dolgorukov
- Military career
- Allegiance: Russian Empire
- Branch: Imperial Russian Army
- Service years: 1796–1808
- Rank: Major General
- Conflicts: Russian-Persian War; War of the Fourth Coalition; Battle of Pułtusk (1806); Battle of Mohrungen; Battle of Eylau; Finnish War; Battle of Koljonvirta †

Prince Mikhail Petrovich Dolgorukov (Russian: Князь Михаил Петрович Долгоруков; 1780—1808) was a Russian prince and general who died at the Battle of Virta Bridge against the Swedes on 27 October 1808.

== Biography ==
The son of General Prince Peter Petrovich Dolgorukov, Mikhail Petrovich was born into the Rurikid family of Dolgorukov. In 1796, he fought in the Russian-Persian War on the Caspian Sea. After being promoted to major in 1798, he joined the Chevalier Guard Regiment and then the Life Guard Regiment in 1799 where he became a colonel in 1800.

In the early 1800s, he travelled around Europe for four years before returning to Russia in 1805. After successful action at Pułtusk, Mohrungen, Passenheim, Wolfsdorf and Eylau, he was promoted to major general in 1807. In 1808, he led the Russian troops against the Swedes during the Russian advance to Gamlakarleby, attacking the Swedes near Himango on 27 October 1808 where he was killed by a cannonball at the Battle of Koljonvirta. Shortly before his death in 1808, Prince Dologukov challenged Gen. Nikolay Tuchkov to a duel. It happened amidst the Finnish War, so Tuchkov proposed that instead of a conventional duel, they make a joint appearance on the frontline, so that injuries might be blamed on an enemy bullet. So was their decision, and Dolgorukov was soon killed by a cannonball launched from Swedish lines.
