= Vasily Vladimirovich Dolgorukov =

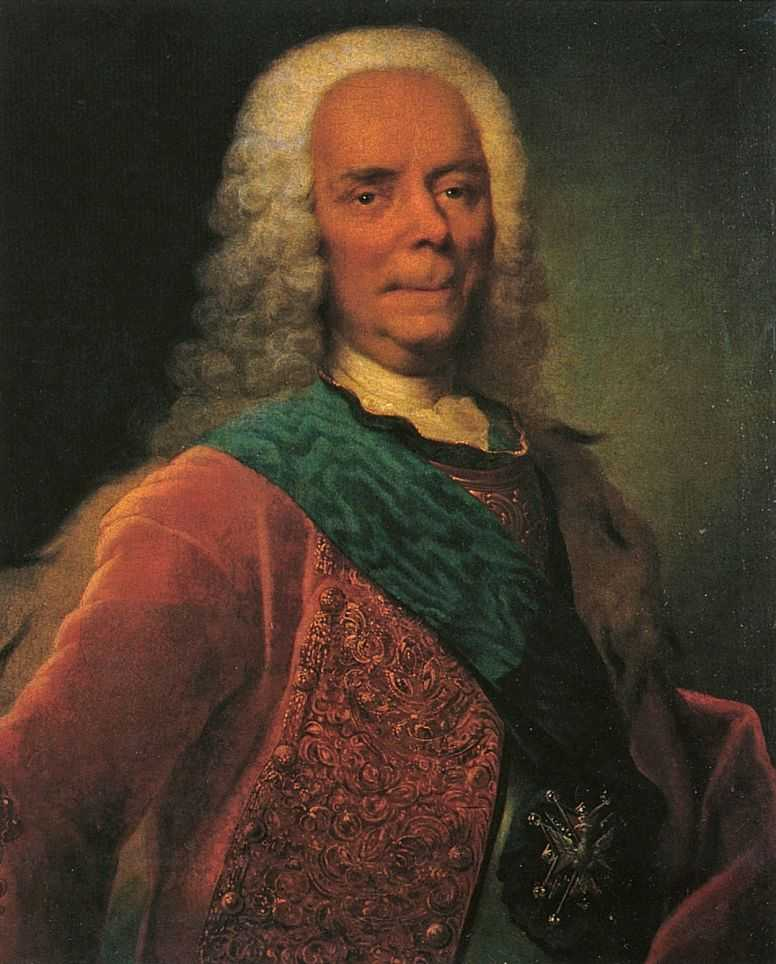
Prince Vasily Dolgorukov

Prince Vasily Vladimirovich Dolgorukov (Russian: Князь Василий Владимирович Долгоруков; c. January 1667 – 11 February 1746, Saint Petersburg) was a Russian military commander and politician. He would eventually be promoted to Field Marshal (генерал-фельдмаршал) in 1728. His life and fortune swung like a weather vane, due to complex plots and the troubled time following Peter the Great's death.

== Life ==
Son of a boyar, Vasili Dolgorukov was, starting from 1685, a stolnik at the royal court. He was then enlisted in the Preobrazhensky regiment in 1700, starting his military career.

Serving in the Preobrazhensky regiment, he took part in Russian Northern Wars and distinguished himself during the siege of Mitava in 1705. In 1706, he was transferred to Ukraine, where he was under the command of Ivan Mazepa, and distinguished himself in 1707–1708 during the squelching of the Bulavin Rebellion. He was sent by Tsar Peter the Great with a force of 10,000 infantry and dragoons to take offensive action against the rebels and avenge the murder of his brother Prince Yury Vladimirovich Dolgorukov who had been killed by the rebel army during the rebellion.

During the Battle of Poltava he was the commander of the reserve cavalry force. In 1715, he was sent to Poland as a represent of Peter (who was ill at that time), where he concluded, in 1716, a pact with Danzig, forcing the city into an anti-Swedish policy. He also accompanied Peter the Great during his foreign travels in 1717 and 1718.

Despite being a favourite of Peter the Great, Dolgorukov disapproved a number of Peter's reforms, and eventually became a partisan of tsarevich Alexei Petrovich. In 1718, following Alexei's trial and death, Dolgorukov reproached Peter such a violent behaviour towards his own son. Dolgorukov was tried but spared execution, though he was demoted and exiled to Solikamsk to the east of Moscow.

Following Catherine I's coronation on 7 May 1724, Dolgorukov was restored in title, brought back from his exile to court and given the rank of colonel and then brigadier. In 1726, he was appointed commander-in-chief of Caucasus forces. In 1728, as an ultimate consecration of his military career, he was promoted field marshal and member of the Supreme Privy Council under Peter II of Russia. Together with his brother Alexey Grigoryevich Dolgorukov they arrested and exiled their rival Alexander Danilovich Menshikov.

After Anna Ioanovna's coronation in 1730, Dolgoroukov was appointed to Senate and made president of College of War. However, reportedly made insulting remarks regarding persecutions staged by Anna against his family. In 1731, after a complex plot, he was accused of insulting remarks regarding the Empress and sentenced to death. His sentence was changed to life imprisonment first in Schlisselburg fortress, then in Ivangorod in 1737, and finally he was exiled for life to the Solovetsky Monastery in 1739.

In December 1741, following Elizabeth's coronation, Dorgorukov was brought back from his exile and fully rehabilitated. Elizabeth named him president of the College of War, a rank that he assumed until his death. While serving in the War College, Dolgoroukov made significant improvements regarding the organization and logistics of Russian military.

== Bibliography ==
- Massie, Robert K. (12 May 2022). Peter the Great. Apollo. ISBN 978-1-80110-277-3.
- Soviet military encyclopedia
- Bantysh-Kamensky, Biographies of Russian generalissimos and field marshals, Moscow, 1991.
- Brockhaus and Efron Encyclopedic Dictionary
