= Robert Bruce (1668–1720) =

Russian soldier (1668–1720)

Robert Bruce (Russian: Рома́н Ви́лимович Брюс, romanized: Roman Vilimovich Bryus; 1668–1720) was the first chief commander of Saint Petersburg. Of Scottish descent, he was the brother of Jacob Bruce and father of Alexander Romanovich Bruce.

== Biography ==
In 1683, Bruce joined the personal armed forces of Peter I, in 1695 receiving the rank of captain in the Preobrazhensky Regiment. He took part in the Azov campaigns of Peter I (1695–1696) and probably accompanied Peter on his travels abroad (1697–1698).

In 1700, he was appointed colonel of one of the infantry regiments, which participated in the siege of Narva.

In 1702, he was at siege and capture of Noteburg; in 1703 he participated in the capture of Nyenskans. On 17 May 1704 he was appointed chief commander of St. Petersburg. In this role, he served the city well, making use of the frequent absences St. Petersburg Governor Alexander Danilovich Menshikov to improve defences.

In 1706, he attempted to take the city of Vyborg, ending in failure in October.

In 1708, he was sent to protect St. Petersburg and assist Admiral Fedor Matveevich Apraksin. That autumn, he helped Apraksin's expedition to destroy the forces of Swedish general Lyubeker attempting to reverse Russian gains in Ingria.

In 1710, from March to June, he was at the siege and capture of Vyborg, for which he was awarded estates. From July to the first week of September he besieged and conquered Kexholm, taking it on 8 September. Bruce was promoted to Lieutenant General, and ended his military career.

Subsequent years until his death he devoted exclusively to life in St. Petersburg, paired with the title of chief commandant.

Bruce died in 1720 and was buried within the Peter and Paul Fortress.

== Sources ==
- "Брюс, Роман Вилимович" . Brockhaus and Efron Encyclopedic Dictionary (in Russian). 1906.
