= Peter II of Russia =

Emperor of Russia from 1727 to 1730

Peter II
- Tsar
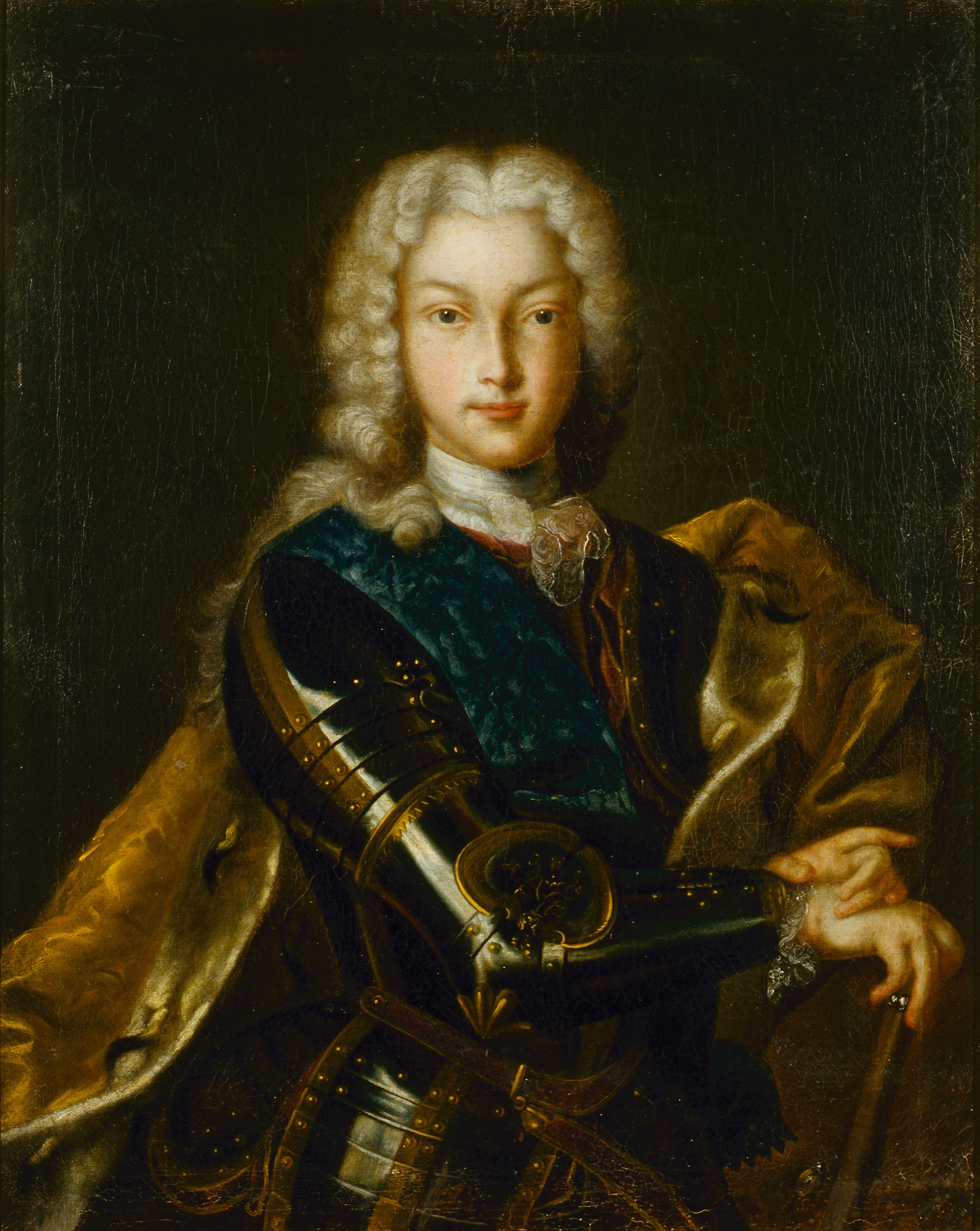
- Portrait, 1720s

Emperor of Russia
- Reign: 17 (6) May 1727 – 30 (19) January 1730
- Coronation: 25 February (7 March) 1728, Cathedral of Dormition, Moscow
- Predecessor: Catherine I
- Successor: Anna
- Born: 23 October 1715; Masenkov Palace, Saint Petersburg, Russian Empire
- Died: 30 January 1730 (aged 14); Lefortov Palace, Moscow, Russian Empire
- Burial: Archangel Cathedral, Moscow
Names
- Pyotr Alekseyevich Romanov
- House: Romanov
- Father: Alexei Petrovich, Tsarevich of Russia
- Mother: Charlotte Christine of Brunswick-Lüneburg
- Religion: Russian Orthodox
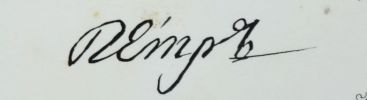
- Signature

Peter II Alexeyevich (Note: Russian: Пётр II Алексеевич, romanized: Pyotr II Alekseyevich) (23 October 1715 – 30 January 1730) (Note: Old Style date: 12 October 1715 – 19 January 1730) was Emperor of Russia from 1727 until 1730, when he died at the age of 14. He was the only son of Tsarevich Alexei Petrovich (Note: Son of Peter the Great by his first wife, Eudoxia Lopukhina.) and Charlotte Christine of Brunswick-Lüneburg. After Catherine I's death, Alexander Menshikov controlled Peter II, but was thwarted by his opponents and exiled by Peter. Peter was also influenced by favorites like Prince Aleksey Dolgorukov, leading to a neglect of state affairs and the tightening of serfdom. Peter's reign was marked by disengagement, disorder, and indulgence. He was engaged to Ekaterina Dolgorukova, but died suddenly of smallpox before the marriage, thus making him the last male agnatic member of the House of Romanov.

== Early life ==
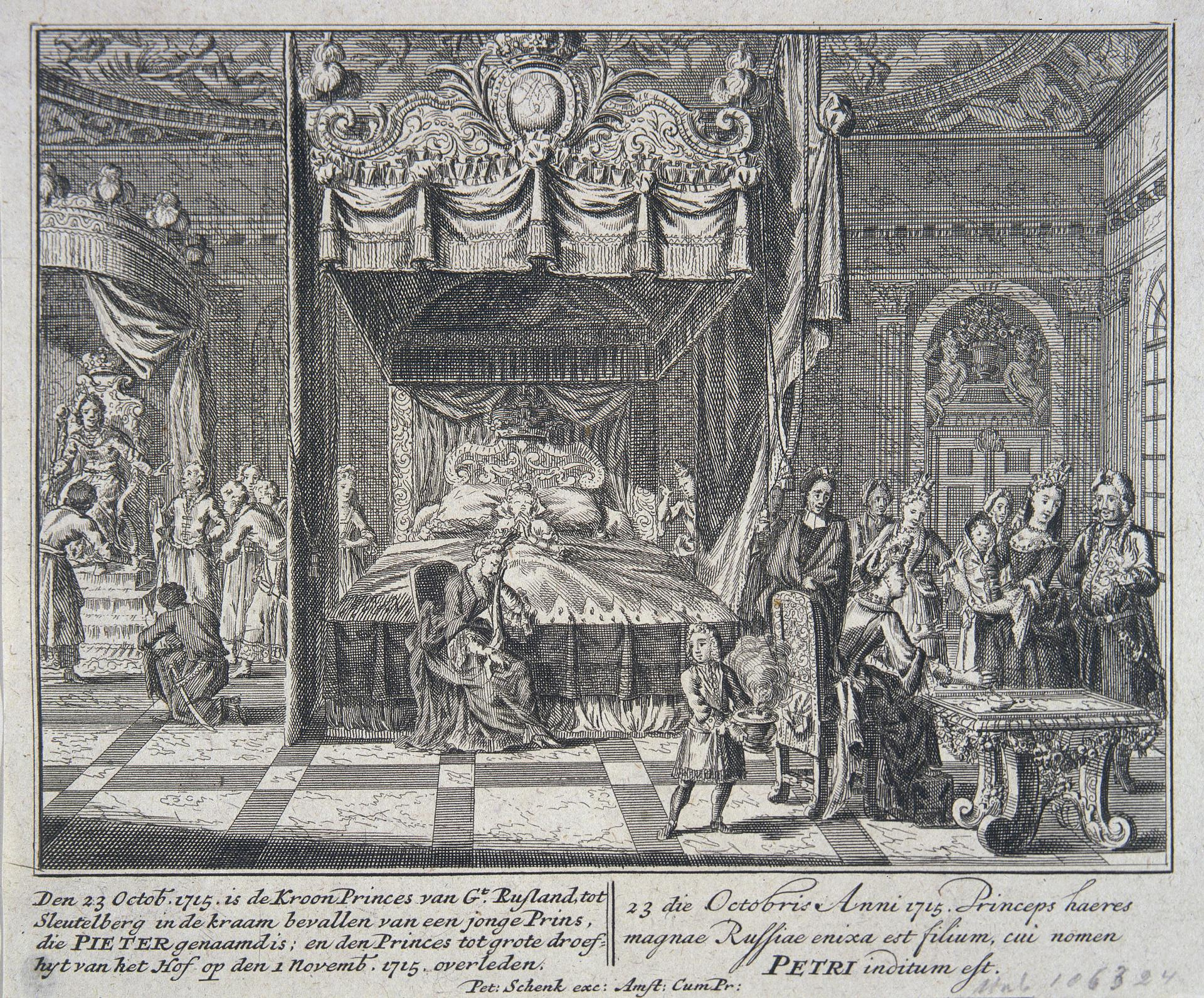
The birth of Peter II of Russia, by Peter Schenk (1715)

Peter was born in Saint Petersburg on 23 (O.S. 12) October 1715. His father was the only living son of Peter the Great. His mother was well-connected to European royalty, and through her, Peter was a first cousin of Empress Maria Theresa of Austria.

Peter's mother died when he was only ten days old. His father, the tsarevich Alexei, accused of treason by his own father, Peter the Great, died in prison in 1718. So three-year-old Peter and his four-year-old sister, Natalya, became orphans. Their grandfather showed no interest in their upbringing or education: the Tsar had disliked their father and even their grandmother, his own first wife, and young Peter in particular reminded him of his only son Alexei, whom the Tsar suspected of treachery. Therefore, from his childhood, the young and orphaned Peter was kept in the strictest seclusion. His earliest governesses were the wives of a tailor and a vintner from the Dutch settlement, while a sailor named Norman taught him the rudiments of navigation. When he grew older, however, Peter was placed under the care of a Hungarian noble, Janos (Ivan) Zeikin (Zékány), who seems to have been a conscientious teacher.

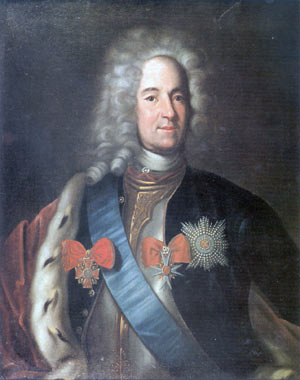
Menshikov was the de facto ruler of Russia when Peter II came to the throne

Peter the Great died in 1725 and was succeeded by his second wife, Catherine I, a woman of low birth. The powerful minister Aleksandr Danilovich Menshikov, who had aided in Catherine's accession, replaced the boy's teachers with the vice-chancellor, Count Ostermann. The program of education that Ostermann compiled included history, geography, mathematics, and foreign languages, but the overall education of the future emperor remained shallow and left much to be desired. Peter himself did not display much interest in study; his favorite occupations were hunting and feasting.

By the time Catherine I died in 1727, it had become clear to those in power that the only grandson of Peter the Great could not be kept from his inheritance much longer. The majority of Russians and three-quarters of the nobility (especially the old-established nobility) were on his side, while the Holy Roman Emperor Charles VI (the husband of Peter's mother's elder sister, Elisabeth Christine of Brunswick-Wolfenbüttel) persistently urged Peter's claims through the imperial ambassador at Saint Petersburg. Through the efforts of Menshikov, Catherine and the court named Peter as Catherine's heir apparent, even though Catherine had two daughters of her own. The supreme privy council were to act as regents. The relevant documentation also specified the betrothal of Peter to Menshikov's daughter Maria.

== Reign ==
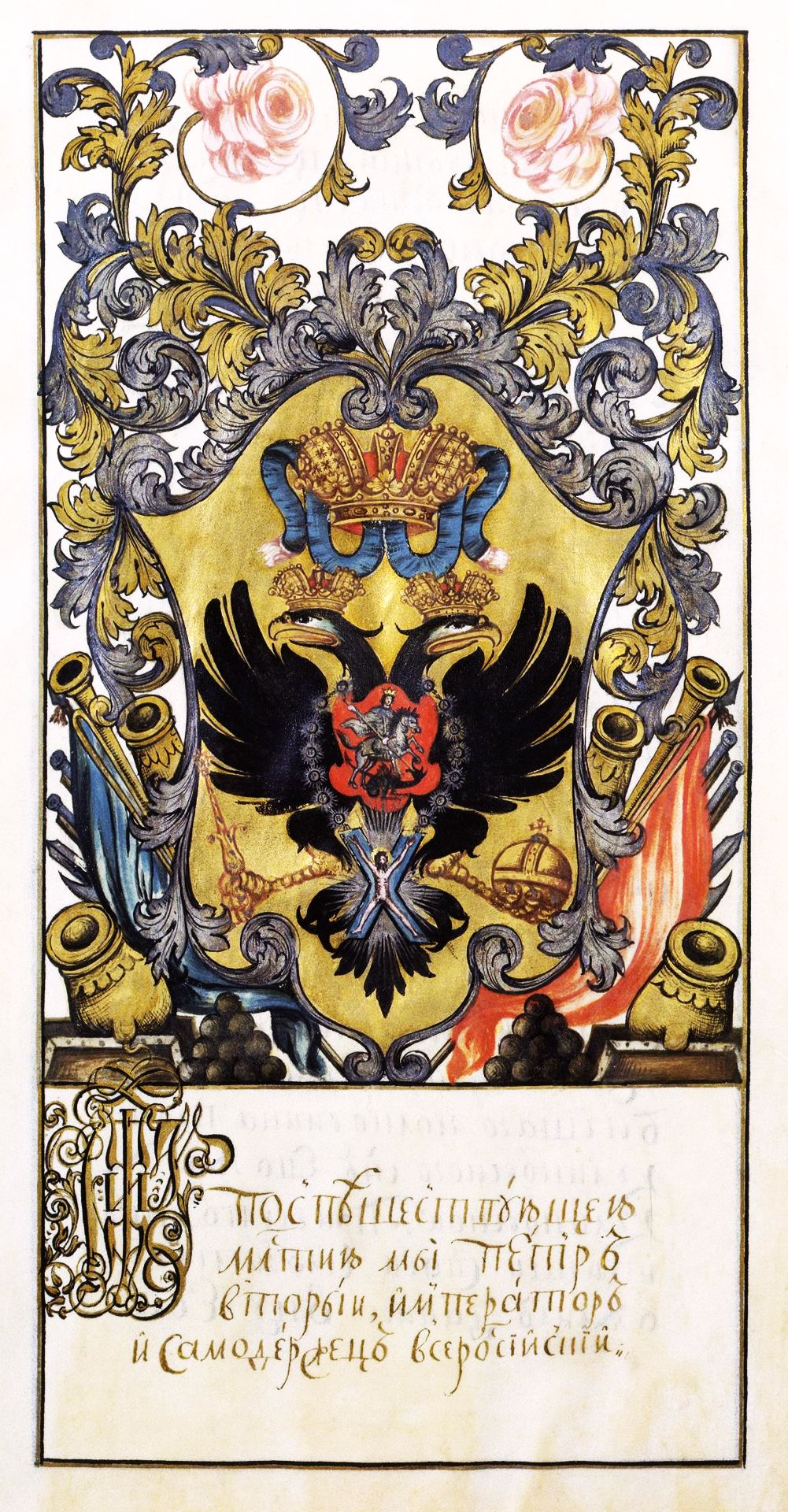
Peter II's coat of arms of Russia (1727–1728)

After Catherine's death in May 1727 and the proclamation of the 11-year-old Peter II as emperor, Menshikov took the young autocrat into his own house on Vasilievsky Island and had full control over all of his actions. For a few months in the summer of 1727, "[n]ot even Peter the Great was so feared or so obeyed", according to the Saxon ambassador. Menshikov became arrogant and domineering. He issued orders to the Emperor himself and then removed a silver plate that Peter had just given as a gift to his sister Natalya. To which the Emperor replied, "We shall see who is emperor, you or I." Soon, however, Menshikov became sick, and his opponents took advantage of his illness. Under the influence of Ostermann and the Dolgorukovs, Peter – long sick of Menshikov's wardship – stripped him of his rank (September 1727) and exiled him to Siberia. The Emperor also dissolved his engagement with Menshikov's daughter.

The senate, the privy council and the guards took the oath of allegiance forthwith. At this time, German mathematician Christian Goldbach was appointed tutor to the young Peter II to take over from Andrey Osterman, whom Menshikov had appointed.

Peter II was quick-witted, but apparently a stubborn and wayward boy, much like his grandfather. Despite these similarities, the emperor had no desire to learn to rule, unlike Peter the Great. His young age meant that he could not adequately manage public affairs, and he almost never appeared at the Supreme Privy Council. This led to frustration among his subjects and in the imperial administration – officials did not dare to assume responsibility for important decisions. The Russian fleet became neglected, but Peter II showed no interest in the matter. Peter tightened serfdom by banning serfs from volunteering for military service and thus escaping their status.

With the fall of Menshikov and related court intrigues, the Emperor's main favorites became Prince Aleksey Dolgorukov and his son Ivan, who maintained great influence over the Emperor's decisions. According to contemporaries, Ivan Dolgorukov lived a reckless and profligate lifestyle, leading Peter II to spend much time feasting, playing cards and enjoying the company of women. He soon became addicted to alcohol.

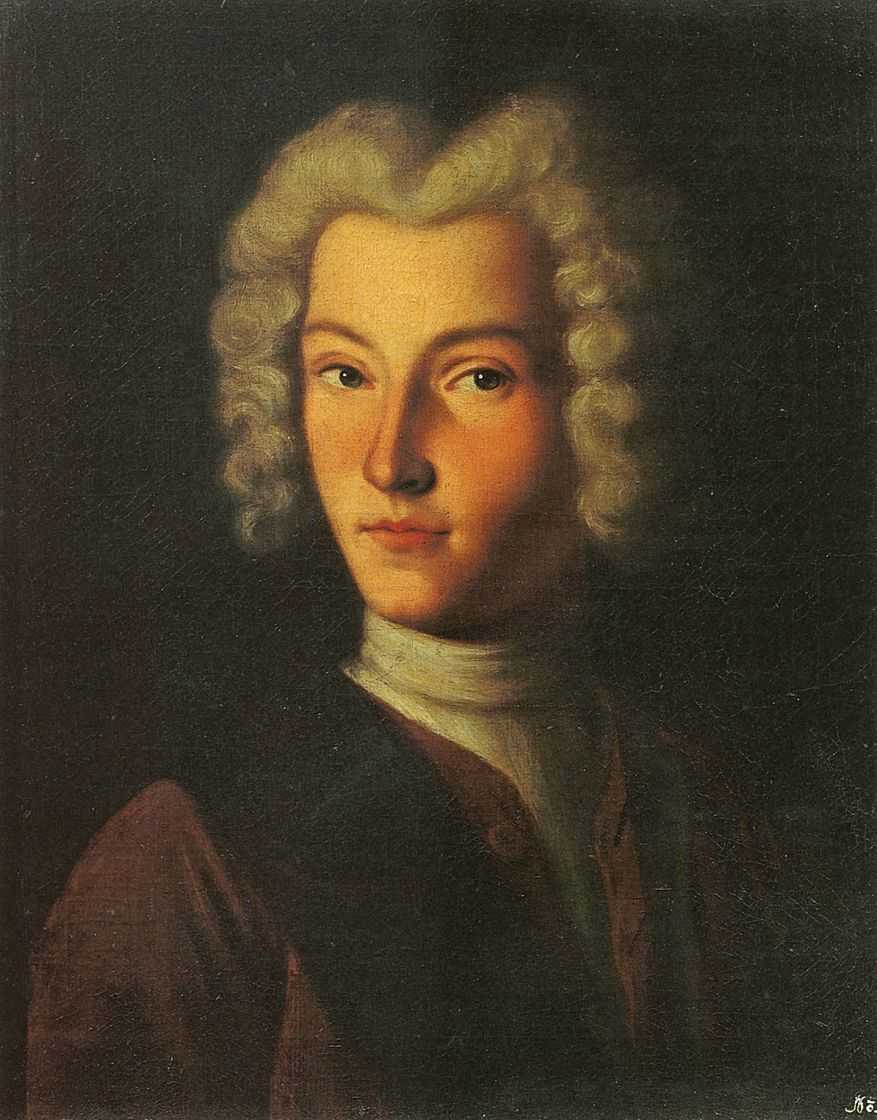
Portrait of Emperor Peter II

The coronation of Peter II took place at the Cathedral of Dormition in Kremlin, Moscow on 9 January 1728, with the Emperor and a huge entourage. Still, he was disengaged from the affairs of state. Foreign witnesses proclaimed: "All of Russia is in terrible disorder ... money is not paid to anyone. God knows what will happen with finances. Everyone steals, as much as he can." Moving the court and several other institutions from Saint Petersburg back to Moscow in 1728 was painful for the "Northern Capital", as well as for the nobility forced to move with it, as Peter the Great had put much effort into developing Saint Petersburg into a large and lively city.

Peter II returned to Saint Petersburg from time to time, but continued to lead an aimless life full of entertainment and distraction. He gradually fell under the thorough-going influence of the Dolgorukovs, and became smitten with the 18-year-old beauty Ekaterina Alekseyevna Dolgorukova. The Dolgorukov family schemed to tie themselves to the imperial bloodline, and persuaded Peter to become engaged to marry Ekaterina. However, it soon became clear that the young monarch had no interest in his fiancee, perhaps influenced by his aunt Elizabeth Petrovna, who did not like Ekaterina. Planning for the wedding went forward regardless, set to take place on 30 January [O.S. 19 January] 1730.

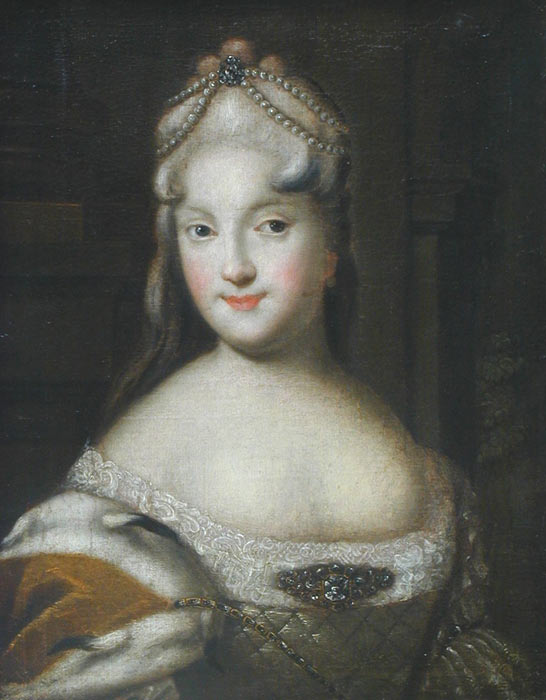
Portrait of Peter II's fiancé, Ekaterina Alekseyevna Dolgorukova

"Peter II has not reached the age when a person's personality has already shaped," historian Mykola Kostomarov wrote.

"While contemporaries praised his natural intelligence and good heart, they only hoped for that good to happen in the future. However, his behavior did not give chances to hope that he would be a good ruler. He hated learning and thinking about national affairs. He was totally engrossed in amusements, and was kept under someone else's influence."

In late December 1729 Peter II fell dangerously ill. His condition deteriorated sharply after the frosty Epiphany Day (17 January [O.S. 6 January] 1730), when he participated in a feast. He was then rushed into the Lefortovo palace, standing at the back of his sleigh. The next day doctors diagnosed smallpox. The Dolgorukovs attempted to get the Emperor to sign a testament naming Ekaterina as his heir, but they were not allowed into the dying emperor’s quarters: Peter II was already unconscious. In his delirium, he ordered horses so that he could visit his sister Natalya (who had died in 1728). A few minutes later, he died.

Emperor Peter II died as dawn broke on 30 January 1730 – the day scheduled for his marriage to Ekaterina Dolgorukova. He is buried in the Cathedral of the Archangel located at the Moscow Kremlin and was the only post-Petrine Russian monarch given that honor; along with Ivan VI (who was murdered and buried in the fortress of Shlisselburg), he is the only post-Petrine monarch not buried in the Peter and Paul Cathedral in Saint Petersburg.

With Peter's death, the direct male line of the Romanov dynasty ended. He was succeeded on the Russian throne by his cousin Anna Ivanovna, daughter of Peter the Great's half-brother and co-ruler, Ivan V.

== See also ==
- Family tree of Russian monarchs

== Bibliography ==
- Massie, Robert K. (2022-05-12). Peter the Great. Apollo. ISBN 978-1-80110-277-3.

Regnal titles
Preceded by Catherine I	Emperor of Russia; 18 May 1727– 29 January 1730	Succeeded by Anna
