= Ministerial reform in the Russian Empire =

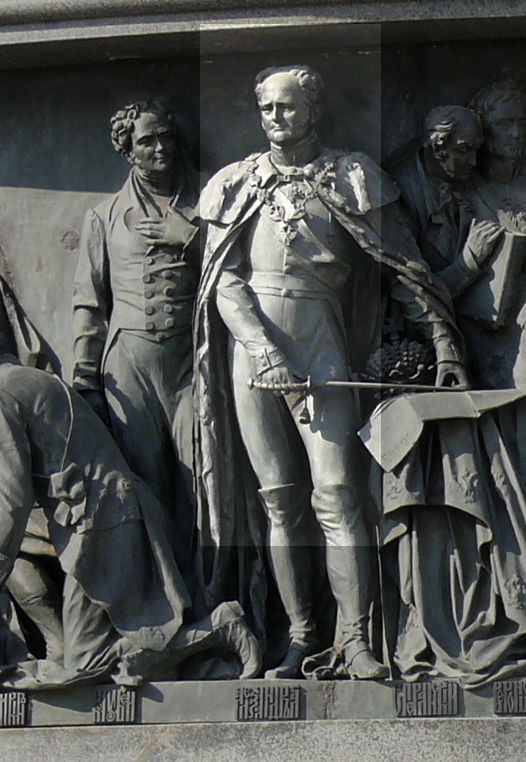
Alexander I at the monument "1000th Anniversary of Russia" in Veliky Novgorod.

Ministerial Reform was one of the reforms of public administration of the Russian Empire, carried out at the beginning of the 19th century under Emperor Alexander I. The first stage of the reform occurred in 1802–1803, the second stage was carried out in 1810–1811. As a result of the reform, the ministries replaced the archaic collegiums.

== Background ==
The onset of the nineteenth century brought public administration reforms to Russia: upon accession to the throne, the young emperor Alexander I created the State Council ("The Permanent Council"), active work was underway on new laws, but a new management system was needed that could quickly solve many growing problems of public policy. On September 8, 1802, Alexander I signed the manifesto "On the Establishment of Ministries". Even then, the emperor reformer emphasized that "we expect them to be loyal, active and zealous for the good of all...".

== Origins of ministerial reform ==
=== First transformative experiments ===
The first transformative experiments were associated with the initial period of the reign of Emperor Alexander I, whose accession to the throne was enthusiastically received by Russian society.

The new government hastened to immediately declare the direction in which it intended to act. In the manifesto on March 12, 1801, the emperor assumed the obligation to rule the people "according to the laws and to the heart of his wise grandmother". In the decrees, as well as in private conversations, the emperor expressed the basic rule by which he would be guided: actively place strict law in place of personal arbitrariness. The emperor has repeatedly pointed out the main flaw with which the Russian state order suffered. He called this flaw "the arbitrariness of our rule". To eliminate it, it was necessary to develop fundamental laws, which almost did not exist in Russia. It was in this direction that the transformative experiments of the first years were conducted.

From the first days of the new reign, the emperor was surrounded by people whom the emperor urged to help him with transformative work. These were former members of the grand-ducal circle: Count Pavel Stroganov, Count Victor Kochubey, Prince Adam Chartorysky and Nikolay Novosiltsev. These people formed the so-called "Secret Committee", which gathered in the secluded room of the emperor during 1801–1803 and worked out a plan of necessary transformations with it. The task of this committee was to help the emperor "in a systematic work on the reform of the shapeless empire management building". It was supposed to preliminarily study the current situation of the empire, then to transform certain parts of the administration and complete these separate reforms with "the code established on the basis of the true national spirit". The "Secret Committee", which functioned until November 9, 1803, for two and a half years considered the implementation of the Senate and Ministerial reforms, the activities of the "Permanent Council", the peasant question, the coronation projects of 1801 and a number of foreign policy events.

Started with central management. The Council at the Supreme Court, assembled at the personal discretion of Empress Catherine, was replaced by a permanent institution, called the "Permanent Council", on April 11, 1801, for the consideration and discussion of state affairs and decisions. It consisted of 12 high dignitaries without division into departments.

After a year and a half, the Peter's collegiums were transformed, which already under Catherine, having lost their original character. Then a personal decree was issued on the rights and obligations of the Senate.

Along with administrative reforms, public relations were also affected. It also sharply stated the direction in which it was supposed to act. This direction consisted in the equation of all social conditions before the law. Thus, the new central departments and ministries were the sole institutions, and the provincial institutions led by them maintained the former collegial system.

=== Preparation and development of ministerial reform ===
The discussion of the ministerial reform was devoted to 9 meetings of the Secret Committee (8 meetings from February 10 to May 12, 1802, and one meeting on March 16, 1803). The ministerial reform had both supporters (Victor Kochubei, Nikolai Novosiltsev, Adam Chartorysky, Pavel Stroganov, etc.) and opponents (Dmitry Troshchinsky, Sergey Rumyantsev, Peter Zavadovsky and others).

The foundation for the establishment of a ministerial system of government in Russia was laid on September 8, 1802, with the manifesto "On the Establishment of Ministries". With this document, the collegiums were transformed into eight ministries – foreign affairs, military ground forces, naval forces, internal affairs, finance, justice, commerce and public education.

In addition to the eight new ministries, the Manifesto determined the position of two other public administration institutions that existed before – the "departments" of the State Treasurer and the Expedition on State Revenues. They continued to act "until the publication of the complete Charter for this part", based on the Decree of October 24, 1780. According to this decree, the Expedition on State Revenues was subordinate to the person performing the position of State Treasurer. Thus, the status of the State Treasury was confirmed as another, along with eight ministries, the central government administration institution.

According to the Manifesto of September 8, 1802, the former collegiums and their subordinate places were reassigned to ministries or entered into them as departments; the main difference between the new central government bodies was the one-man management: each department was governed by a minister instead of the former collegial presence; ministers were responsible to the Senate. Each subordinate body presented its minister with weekly memorials of current affairs and representations in special cases. The minister answered them with suggestions. In case of disagreement with the Minister's proposals, the subordinate bodies presented reasoning to the Minister. If the latter insisted on his proposal, then it was executed, and the opinion of subordinate bodies was recorded in the journal.

Thus, the combination of two public administration systems – collegial and ministerial – was carried out, which was the result of a compromise decision made by Alexander I at a meeting of the "Secret Committee" on March 24, 1802. In accordance with this decision, the collegiums were not abolished, but continued to act in subordination to the ministers and were subject to gradual abolition in the future, when experience shows their futility. To assist the ministers (except for the ministers of the military ground forces, naval forces, commerce and the State Treasurer), deputy deputies were appointed – comrades of ministers who could replace the latter during their absence. Ministers pledged to immediately engage in the formation of their offices and the compilation of their staffs.

The Manifesto's last sentence briefly mentions a committee "composed solely" of ministers considering current affairs. Thus, an important government body was created – the Committee of Ministers, which had a significant impact not only on the ministerial system, but also on the entire system of state power of the Russian Empire.

=== Speransky's conversion plan ===
In the first years of the reign of Alexander I, Mikhail Speransky still remained in the background, although he prepared some documents and projects for members of the "Secret Committee", including on ministerial reform. A week after the accession of Alexander I to the throne, Speransky was appointed Secretary of State under Dmitry Troshchinsky, who, in turn, served as Secretary of State under Alexander I. Thus Speransky found himself in a circle of people who largely determined the state's policy. The abilities of the assistant Troshchinsky attracted the attention of members of the "Secret Committee". In the summer of 1801, Viktor Kochubey took Speransky to his "team". At that time, work was under way in the Secret Committee on the development of ministerial reform.

After the reform, Kochubey, who headed the Ministry of the Interior, transferred him to his office. In June 1802, Speransky headed the department at the Ministry of Internal Affairs, which was instructed to prepare draft state reforms.

In 1802–1804, Speransky prepared several of his own political notes: "On the Fundamental Laws of the State", "On the Gradual Improvement of Public Opinion", "On the Power of Public Opinion", "Something More About Freedom and Slavery". In these documents, he first stated his views on the state of the Russian state apparatus and substantiated the need for reforms in the country.

On February 20, 1803, with the direct participation of Speransky, the famous decree "On Free Cultivators" was published. According to this decree, the landowners received the right to release the serfs into "freedom", giving them land. Inspired by the "Notes" of the young leader, the king through Viktor Kochubey instructs Speransky to write a capital treatise – a plan for transforming the state machine of the empire, and he enthusiastically gives himself to a new job.

In 1803, on behalf of the emperor, Speransky compiled a "Note on the Structure of Judicial and Governmental Institutions in Russia", in which he proved himself to be a supporter of the constitutional monarchy, created by the gradual reform of society on the basis of a carefully developed plan. However, this Note did not have practical value. Only in 1807, after unsuccessful wars with France and the signing of the Tilsit Peace, in the context of the domestic political crisis, did Alexander again turn to reform plans.

Speransky was essentially a zealous and diligent official, independent by virtue of his descent from a particular group of high-ranking aristocracy. He was to develop and implement a reform plan based on the ideas and principles prompted by the emperor.

Speransky did not immediately receive his new role. At first, the emperor entrusted him with some "private affairs". Already in 1807, Speransky was invited several times to dinner at the courtyard, this fall he accompanied Alexander to Vitebsk for a military review, and a year later to Erfurt, to meet with Napoleon. It was already a sign of high confidence. In Erfurt, Speransky, who was fluent in French, became close to representatives of the French administration, looked closely at them, and learned a lot from them. Upon returning to Russia, Speransky was appointed a fellow of the Minister of Justice and, together with the emperor, began working on a general plan of state reforms.

The most complete reformist views of Mikhail Speransky were reflected in a note in 1809 – "Introduction to the Enactment of State Laws". The reformer attached great importance to the regulatory role of the state in the development of domestic industry and, through its political transformations, strengthened the autocracy in every way. Speransky writes: "If the rights of state power were unlimited, if the state forces were united in sovereign power and they did not leave any rights to subjects, then the state would be in slavery and the government would be despotic".

The reform plan drawn up by Speransky was, as it were, an exposition of the thoughts, ideas and intentions of the sovereign himself. As the contemporary researcher of this problem Sergey Mironenko correctly observes, "independently, without the tsar's sanction and approval, Speransky would never have dared to propose measures that were extremely radical in the conditions of the then Russia".

== Final stage of ministerial reform ==
=== Central control administration according to the plan of Speransky ===
On March 28, 1806, Minister of the Interior Viktor Kochubey submitted to Alexander I a "Note on the Establishment of Ministries". It noted a "perfect confusion" in public administration, which "reached the highest degree" after the ministerial reform of 1802. The Minister proposed the following corrective measures:

- The selection of like-minded ministers;
- Determining the attitude of ministries to the Senate, the Committee of Ministers, the Permanent Council, the provincial government;
- Settlement of relations between ministries;
- Empowerment of ministers on the merits;
- Definition of responsibility of ministers.

The foreign political events of 1805–1808 (the war with France as part of the Third Coalition in 1805 and the Fourth Coalition in 1806–1807, the Russian–French negotiations in Tilsit in June 1807 and in Erfurt in October 1808) diverted Alexander I's attention from affairs of internal management. But it was precisely at this time that Mikhail Speransky, the true author of the report of July 18, 1803, and the note of March 28, 1806, began to take an increasingly active part in the implementation of the ministerial reform.

=== Legislative reform ===
Since the end of 1808, Mikhail Speransky became the closest associate of Alexander I, with the sanction of the latter dealing with "subjects of higher management". By October 1809, the shortcomings of ministerial reform were systematized by Mikhail Speransky in his "Introduction to the Enforcement of State Laws" – an extensive plan of reforms for the entire domestic political structure of the country, drawn up on behalf of Alexander I.

In this project, Speransky identifies three main disadvantages of ministerial reform:

- Lack of responsibility of ministers;
- Some inaccuracy and disproportion in the division of affairs between the ministries;
- Lack of precise rules or institution.

A new transformation of the ministries of 1810–1811 was aimed at eliminating these shortcomings. Ministerial reform has entered its final period. Its beginning was already proclaimed in the Manifesto "On the Establishment of the State Council": "The various units entrusted to the Ministries require different additions. At the initial establishment, it was supposed, gradually and considering their very action, to bring these establishments to perfection. Experience has shown the need to complete their most convenient division. We will propose to the Council the beginnings of their final arrangement and the main foundations of the General Ministerial Order, which accurately defines the relations of the Ministers to other State Establishments and their limits of action and the degree of their responsibility will be indicated".

The legal basis for the final period of the ministerial reform was three legislative acts:

- The manifesto "On the Division of State Affairs Into Special Departments, With the Designation of Objects Belonging to Each Department" of July 25, 1810,
- "The Highest Approved Division of State Affairs into Ministries" of August 17, 1810, and
- "General Institution of the Ministries" of June 25, 1811.

These acts were previously discussed in a specially created committee for consideration of proposals for the transformation of ministries and the Senate and on the new recruitment procedure for the Committee of Chairmen of Departments of the State Council, which operated from May 27, 1810, to November 28, 1811. Further, the projects were approved at a general meeting of the State Council and submitted to the emperor for approval. The drafts of all three acts were developed by Mikhail Speransky.

The manifesto of July 25, 1810, divided all state affairs "in executive order" into five main parts:

- Foreign relations administered by the Ministry of Foreign Affairs;
- External security device, which was entrusted to the military and naval ministries;
- State economy, which was in charge of the ministries of internal affairs, education, finance, the State treasurer, the audit of state accounts, the Main Directorate of Ways of communication;
- The structure of the civil and criminal court, which was entrusted to the Ministry of Justice;
- Internal security device, which fell under the competence of the Ministry of Police.

The manifesto proclaimed the creation of new central government bodies – the Ministry of Police and the General Directorate of Spiritual Affairs of various confessions.

The competence of the Ministry of the Interior changed significantly: its main subject was "care for the dissemination and promotion of agriculture and industry". All cases related to the "precautionary" and "executive" police were transferred to the Ministry of Police. The title of State Comptroller was established – the head of the audit of state accounts.

Details and controversial issues arising from the direct distribution of cases were discussed in the Committee of Ministers at a meeting on August 4, 1810. The reports of the ministers of foreign affairs, finance, public education, justice, as well as the comrade of the Minister of the Interior were heard. The result of this discussion was the "Highest Approved Separation of State Affairs into Ministries" of August 17, 1810. This act specified the composition of the ministries of the interior, police, public education, finance, the General Directorate of Spiritual Affairs of Foreign Confessions, and also recorded the liquidation of the Ministry of Commerce.

The Manifesto of January 28, 1811, became a continuation of concretization in the field of public administration. "On the Structure of the General Directorate for the Audit of State Accounts".

The "General Establishment of Ministries" of June 25, 1811, became the main legislative act of the ministerial reform. Structurally, it consisted of two parts:

- "Formation of Ministries";
- "General Mandate to Ministries".

The manifesto determined the general division of state affairs and subjects of each ministry and the main administration, largely repeating textually the provisions of the manifesto on July 25, 1810. It established a single overall organizational structure of the central governing bodies. The ministry was headed by the minister and his comrade (deputy). Under the minister were the office and council of the minister. The apparatus of the ministry consisted of several departments, divided into departments, which, in turn, were divided into tables. The rigid principle of unity of command was established. The minister obeyed the emperor, being appointed and deposed of his choice. Directly to the Minister were the directors of departments and offices. Heads of departments were subordinate to department directors. The heads of the departments were subordinate to the heads of the capitals.

Thus, in the years 1810–1812, the legal foundations were laid and the sectoral management system in the country was created. The further development of the ministries was already built taking into account the managerial needs of the state. Changes in the composition of ministries in the first half of the 19th century were associated with the search for the most rational system of central administration of the empire.

All the parts of Speransky's transformational plan that were implemented belong to the central administration, and it was their implementation that informed the latter of a more harmonious appearance. This was the second, more decisive phase on the establishment of a new state order, which was preceded by two private measures that had an internal connection with the forthcoming reforms, as they set the spirit and direction of this reform, indicating what kind of people are required for new government institutions. On April 3, 1809, the Decree on the Court Ranks was issued. This document changed the position of the nobles who wore the ranks of chamberlain and chamber junker, who did not combine with certain and permanent official duties, but provided important advantages. The decree ordered everyone who wore these ranks, but were not in any service, to enter such a service within two months, stating which department they wished to serve in. Themselves these ranks henceforth became a simple distinction, not connected with any official rights.

The decree on August 6 of the same year established the procedure for the production of civil ranks of a college assessor (8th grade) and a state adviser (5th grade). These ranks, which largely determined the appointment, were acquired not only by merit, but also by simple length of service, that is, the established service life. The new decree banned the production of employees who did not have a certificate of completion at one of the Russian universities or did not pass the exam at the university according to the established program, which was attached to the decree. Under this program, those who wanted to receive the rank of college assessor or state adviser were required to know the Russian language and one of the foreign languages, knowledge of the rights of natural, Roman and civil, state economy and criminal laws, a thorough acquaintance with domestic history and basic information in the history of general, in the statistics of Russian states, in geography, even in mathematics and physics.

On January 1, 1810, the transformed State Council was opened. Its significance in the management system was expressed in the Manifesto on January 1 by the definition that in it "all parts of the government, in their main relation to the law, are realized and through it go back to the supreme authority". This means that the State Council was called upon to discuss all aspects of the state system, to decide how much they need new laws, and to submit their considerations to the discretion of the supreme authority.

== Remembrance ==
- The Bank of Russia celebrated the anniversary of the reform with the release of the commemorative coin "The 200th Anniversary of the Formation of Russian Ministries"
