= Committee of Ministers of the Russian Empire =

Russian government from 1802 to 1906

- Комитетъ министровъ Россійской Имперіи

Agency overview
- Formed: September 8, 1802
- Preceding agency: Permanent Council
- Dissolved: April 23, 1906
- Superseding agency: Council of Ministers
- Jurisdiction: Russian Empire

The Committee of Ministers was the highest governmental body of the Russian Empire in 1802–1906. During the Revolution of 1905–07, it was replaced by the Council of Ministers of the Russian Empire.

== Creation ==
Established during the ministerial reform by manifesto of September 8, 1802. Initially consisted of ministers, their associates (deputies) and the state treasurer.

Soon the Committee of Ministers became the "supreme seat of the Empire". This was facilitated by the personal presence at its meetings of Emperor Alexander I, who rarely did not attend its meetings in 1802–1804. During the absence of the emperor, special Ukases were granted extraordinary powers to the Committee of Ministers.

== Composition ==
By the highest order on March 31, 1810, the chairmen of the departments of the State Council were introduced to the Committee of Ministers on all important occasions. The chairmen of the State Council were members of the Committee from August 27, 1905, but in fact they were present in the Committee since 1865, since the Grand Dukes Konstantin Nikolayevich (Chairman of the State Council in 1865–1881) and Michael Nikolaevich (Chairman of the State Council in 1881–1905) were members of the Committee on Special Highest Commandments.

The Chief Procurator of the Holy Synod was a member of the Committee from December 6, 1904, and before that (from 1835) he was called to meetings only when discussing religious matters. However, the Chief Procurators actually attended the Committee from 1865, since Count Dmitry Tolstoy (member of the committee from 1865 to 1880) held other ministerial posts at the same time, and the Chief Prosecutor of the Synod in 1880–1905 Konstantin Pobedonostsev was a member of the Committee on Special Highest Commandment.

Since the epoch of Nicholas I, heirs of the throne were appointed as members of the Committee upon reaching a certain age. Tsesarevich Alexander Nikolaevich (future Alexander II) was appointed to the Committee in 1841 at the age of 23 years, Tsesarevich Alexander Alexandrovich (future Alexander III) – in 1868 at the age of 23 years, Tsesarevich Nicholas Alexandrovich (future Nicholas II) – in 1889 at the age of 21 years. Tsesarevich Nicholas Alexandrovich died in 1865 at the age of 21, not being an appointed member of the Committee.

Since 1812, outsiders also became members of the Committee of Ministers (for the first time, Vice Admiral Alexander Shishkov). In 1892, Grand Dukes Vladimir Alexandrovich and Alexei Alexandrovich were appointed members of the Committee. Since 1893, the State Secretary was a member of the Committee of Ministers. In general, in the post-reform era, members of the Committee were simultaneously from 19 to 24 persons.

== Competence ==
The competence of the Committee of Ministers had little in common with the widespread modern concept of the cabinet and its range of functions. All the ministers (and chief superintendents in parts) were independent of each other, were responsible for the activities of their departments alone and had independent reports from the emperor. The Committee of Ministers was not responsible for the activities of individual ministries, nor for the coherence of their policies. Its competence has developed historically and consisted of extremely diverse groups of questions, most of which were petty and unimportant. A detailed list of the terms of reference of the Committee has continuously changed, with the total number gradually increasing.

Formally, the competence of the Committee consisted of two types of cases:

- The current affairs of the ministerial administration (affairs, "the resolution of which exceeds the limits of the authority entrusted in particular to each minister, and requiring the highest resolution"; matters requiring the consideration of various departments);
- Cases especially assigned to the Committee of Ministers by law.

These norms were very general in nature, and the actual list of cases considered by the Committee was chaotic; only in 1905 the first attempt was made to systematize the subjects of the Committee.

In general, the activity of the Committee was divided into three areas:

- Important interdepartmental issues of public administration;
- "Odious" questions that were formally within the jurisdiction of one ministry, but for which the ministers did not want to take personal responsibility and sought to shift it to the board;
- Petty issues, the list of which was formed in a rather random way (primarily as a result of the evasion of individual ministries from taking on the solution of these tasks); This group of questions has always been the largest.

The most important subject that was under the authority of the Committee was railway affairs. Decisions on the granting of concessions for the construction of railways, the establishment of railway companies, the state guaranteeing their shares and bonds, the redemption of railways to the treasury and the like had, since the era of Alexander II, of paramount state and economic importance. Since 1891, the Committee has considered these cases in joint meetings with the Department of Economy of the State Council.

The minor matters that loaded the Committee were varied and extensive. The most numerous were cases of individual assignment of pensions to retired officials. By the beginning of the era of Alexander II, the existing rates of normal pensions in the civil service were outdated and did not provide pensioners with an acceptable standard of living. From the middle of the 19th century, more and more pensions were granted according to individual Highest Commandments. In 1883, a system of so-called "reinforced" pensions was developed. But these pensions were also assigned on an individual basis, and were individually considered by the Committee of Ministers, which substantially overwhelmed his clerical work.

The second large group of cases was consideration of the statutes of joint-stock companies. Joint-stock companies, the institution of which was regulated by law in 1833, were approved by law, that is, an individual law for each individual society. The competence of the Committee of Ministers included consideration of all charters deviating from the requirements of the law, and since the outdated law allowed only registered shares, and almost all founders wanted to issue bearer shares, the Committee considered almost all charters of newly established companies by the end of the 19th century. The number of such cases reached 400 in the years of the greatest economic activity.

The Committee was responsible for the case of Old Believers and sectarians. Since 1882, the Committee has moved away from the consideration of this group of questions that have come under the jurisdiction of the Ministry of Internal Affairs and the Synod. However, even in this area, the competence was poorly outlined by law – in 1894 the Minister of Internal Affairs, Ivan Durnovo, passed through the Committee the Regulations on Stunde, thereby avoiding consideration of the issue in the liberal-minded State Council.

The committee considered the annual reports of the governors, the governor-generals and the report of the state controller for the execution of the state list of expenses and incomes. Usually, the discussion of these reports took place slowly and did not lead to significant consequences. The scandal with the abuses of the Minister of Communications Apollo Krivoshein (1894), which led to his dismissal, revealed by the State Control, can be considered as an exception.

Having displaced the Permanent Council from the field of legislation, the Committee of Ministers in the field of administration appropriated the rights of the Senate, which remained "governing" by name only.

In the sphere of the criminal court, the Committee of Ministers sometimes acted as an accusation chamber, deciding whether to bring it to court, or as an auditing authority, demanding that it take to review the decisions of the courts to itself; sometimes it went into court cases that were not yet completed in lower instances; sometimes, mainly in civil cases, it also acted as the highest appellate instance in relation to the Senate, accepting complaints from individuals about its decisions. It ceased to be a judicial authority only in 1864.

Usually, the Committee of Ministers was engaged only in preliminary discussions of issues. Its conclusion, adopted unanimously or by a majority of votes, was entered in a journal, which was submitted to the emperor for approval.

The peculiarity of the journals was that they detailed, with adduction of detailed arguments, stated not only the position of the majority, but also the position of the minority (if there was no unanimous decision), as well as the special opinions of individual members of the Committee (if they wanted to declare them). The Office of the Committee has compiled journals, trying in the most neutral manner and as meaningful as possible to present the meaningful arguments of the diverging opinions of the parties. The journals were not so much a transcript of the meetings as an analytical note drawn up by the office of the Committee; the opinions expressed in the meetings were reformulated, and in many cases more successful examples and arguments were selected for them. The task of journals in the divergence of opinions was not to convince the emperor that the majority was right, but to objectively present to him the whole range of opinions expressed. This practice completely coincided with the practice of keeping similar journals of the State Council. The accession of the emperor to the minority opinion was not uncommon.

The journal, which ended with the phrase "the Committee believes:", followed by the text of the proposed legislation of the Committee, when approved by the emperor, acquired the force of law called the Highest Approved Regulation of the Committee of Ministers.

== Chairman of the Committee of Ministers ==
During the first years of the existence of the Committee of Ministers, the Russian Emperor chaired the meetings, and in his absence, the members of the Committee of Ministers alternately, starting with the senior in rank, each for 4 meetings.

In 1810, the chairmanship was granted to State Chancellor, Count Nikolay Rumyantsev, who was then chairman of the State Council. Since 1812, the post of chairman of the Committee has become an independent post, which until 1865 was necessarily combined with the chairmanship of the State Council.

According to the established tradition, the chairmanship of the Committee was the last in the public service honorary position, to which dignitaries were appointed, who had become too old to fulfill the many troublesome duties of the minister. A number of the Committee's chairmen (first of all, Prince Alexander Chernyshyov, Count Alexey Orlov, Count Dmitry Bludov) were characterized by contemporaries as "barely alive", "in a pitiful condition". Modest Korf jokingly wrote about Prince Alexander Chernyshyov in his diary: "Look, exactly alive!". Prince Pavel Gagarin died in this position at the age of 83 years.

The relocation of the active and influential Finance Minister Sergei Witte to the post of chairman of the Committee of Ministers was considered by his contemporaries (and Witte himself) as a political collapse and a type of honorable resignation; According to a common joke, Witte "fell up".

=== List of chairmen ===
1. Nikolay Rumyantsev (1810–1812)
2. Nikolai Saltykov (March 1812 – September 1812)
3. Sergey Vyazmitinov (1812–1816)
4. Pyotr Lopukhin (1816–1827)
5. Viktor Kochubey (1827–1832)
6. Nikolay Novosiltsev (1832–1838)
7. Illarion Vasilchikov (1838–1847)
8. Vasily Levashov (1847–1848)
9. Alexander Chernyshyov (1848–1856)
10. Alexey Orlov (1856–1860)
11. Dmitry Bludov (1861–1864)
12. Pavel Gagarin (1864–1872)
13. Pavel Ignatyev (1872–1879)
14. Pyotr Valuyev (1879–1881)
15. Michael von Reutern (1881–1886)
16. Nikolai von Bunge (1887–1895)
17. Ivan Durnovo (1895–1903)
18. Sergei Witte (August 29, 1903 – April 23, 1906)

== Reorganization ==
By decree of Emperor Nicholas II of October 19, 1905, a government was created – the Council of Ministers, which united the ministers into a single cabinet (previously each minister reported directly to the emperor on the affairs of his department). The first chairman of the Council of Ministers was appointed Chairman of the Committee of Ministers Sergei Witte.

The Committee of Ministers was not liquidated when the Council was created: these departments existed in parallel for as long as 6 months (Count Witte remained Chairman of the Committee). The Committee of Ministers was liquidated only on April 23, 1906, together with Witte’s resignation as chairman of the Council of Ministers. The functions of the Committee of Ministers were transferred to the State Council and the Council of Ministers.

== Sources ==
- Remnev, Anatoly (2010). Autocratic government. The Committee of Ministers in the system of top management of the Russian Empire (the second half of the 19th – early 20th century). ROSSPEN.
- Beldova, Maria (1999). Committee of Ministers // Statehood of Russia (end of the 15th century – February 1917): Reference dictionary. Science. ISBN 5-02-008699-1.
- Seredonin, Sergey (1902). Historical review of the activities of the Committee of Ministers: On the centenary of the Committee of Ministers (1802–1902): In 7 volumes.
- Ermolov, Alexey (1891). Committee of Ministers in the reign of Emperor Alexander I.
