= Government reform of Alexander I =

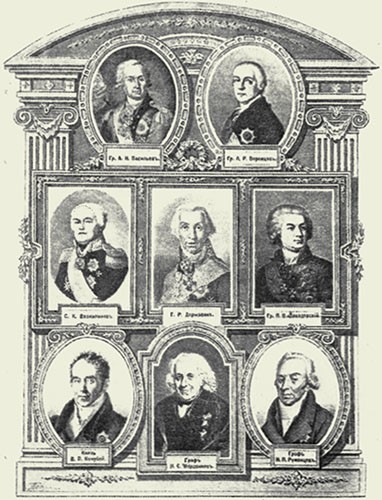
Portraits of first ministers of Imperial Russia in the Neva magazine.

The early Russian system of government instituted by Peter the Great, which consisted of various state committees, each named Collegium, was largely outdated by the 19th century. The responsibilities of the Collegia were chosen very randomly and often overlapped. Alexander sought to fix this system with new reforms.

Soon after Alexander I inherited the throne in 1801, he formed a Privy Committee (Негласный комитет) which consisted of Viktor Kochubey, Nikolay Novosiltsev, Pavel Stroganov and Adam Jerzy Czartoryski. Mikhail Speransky took an active part in the Committee, although he was not a formal member.

The reforms proposed by Speransky were to introduce a parliament and a State Council as legislative and executive bodies of the Tsar and to relieve the Governing Senate of these functions, transforming it to a kind of Supreme Court. Speransky even prepared the Constitution project. The reforms were stopped by 1810 because of the Napoleonic Wars and growing resistance from conservative nobility, as voiced by Nikolai Karamzin.

On September 8, 1802 Alexander issued the Manifesto on the Establishment of Ministries according to which the following ministries had been founded on the basis of the Administration of State Affairs:

- Military Land Forces
- Naval Forces
- Foreign Affairs
- Justice
- Internal Affairs
- Finances
- Commerce
- Education

The Manifesto facilitated the formation of the Russian state and unified the system of the executive power bodies.

The current Ministry of Defense, the Ministry of Foreign Affairs, the Ministry of Justice, the Ministry of Internal Affairs, the Ministry of Finances, the Ministry of Economic Development and Trade, the Ministry of Education of the Russian Federation are indirect successors of the Ministries founded according to the Manifesto of Alexander I.

== See also ==
- Government reform of Peter I
- Government reforms of Alexander II of Russia
- Ministerial reform in the Russian Empire
