= Permanent Council of the Russian Empire =

- Непременный совет

Agency overview
- Formed: April 11, 1801; 225 years ago
- Preceding agency: Council at the Highest Court
- Dissolved: 1810; 216 years ago
- Superseding agencies: State Council; Committee of Ministers

The Permanent Council was the highest deliberative body of the Russian Empire, established on April 11, 1801 and abolished in 1810; predecessor of the State Council.

It consisted of twelve representatives of the titled nobility under the emperor Alexander I (representatives were Dmitry Troshchinsky, Pyotr Zavadovsky, Alexander Vorontsov, Platon Zubov and Valerian Zubov, and others), the chairman was Count Nikolai Saltykov.

The council could protest the actions and Ukases of the emperor. At the beginning of its activities, the Permanent Council considered a number of important issues and prepared several reforms, including a Decree on Free Ploughmen.

With the establishment of ministries and the Committee of Ministers in 1802, insignificant and intricate cases came to the consideration of the Permanent Council, and after the establishment of the State Council, the Permanent Council was finally abolished.

== See also ==
- Private Committee

== Sources ==
- Vernadsky, George (1924). Essay on the history of Russian law of the XVIII – XIX centuries. Flame.
- Lebedev, Vladimir (1958). History of the USSR: XVIII — the middle of the XIX centuries. Uchpedgiz.
"Decree “On the Establishment of an Permanent Council for Considering Important State Affairs"
Указ «Объ учрежденiи непремѣннаго Совѣта для разсматриванiя важныхъ Государственныхъ дѣлъ»

Для разсмотрѣнiя и уваженiя Государственныхъ дѣлъ и постановленiй, вмѣсто временнаго при Дворѣ Нашемъ Совѣта, признали Мы за Благо учредить при Насъ на особенныхъ правилахъ Совѣтъ непримѣнный, составивъ его изъ лицъ, довѣренностiю Нашею и общею почтенныхъ, коихъ число не ограничивая и предоставляя Себѣ ихъ опредѣленiе и уменьшенiе, назначаемъ на сей разъ Членами Совѣта Генералъ-Фельдмаршала Графа Салтыкова, Генерала отъ Инфантерiи Князя Зубова, Генерала отъ Инфантерiи Графа Зубова, Дѣйствительнаго Тайнаго Совѣтника и Вице-Канцлера Князя Куракина, Генерала отъ Инфантерiи и Вице-Президента Военной Коллегiи Ламба, Генерала отъ Инфантерiи и Генералъ-Прокурора Беклешова, Дѣйствительнаго Тайнаго Совѣтника и Государственнаго Казначея Барона Васильева, Генерала отъ Кавалерiи и Санктпетербургскаго Военнаго Губернатора Графа Фонъ деръ Палена, Дѣйствительнаго Тайнаго Совѣтника Князя Лопухина, Дѣйствительнаго Тайнаго Совѣтника и Министра Коммерцiи Князя Гагарина, Адмирала и Вице-Президента Адмиралтействъ-Коллегiи Графа Кушелева и Тайнаго Совѣтника Трощинскаго. Въ основанiе дѣйствiя сего Совѣта, дали Мы ему особенный Наказъ. И какъ по силѣ онаго Совѣтъ долженъ снабдить себя всѣми свѣденiями, до Государственныхъ частей относящимися: то о достовленiи ихъ по требованiю Совѣта во всемъ совершенствѣ, соотвѣтственномъ важному ихъ предназначенiю сего мѣста, Сенатъ Нашъ имѣетъ учинить надлежащимъ мѣстам точнѣйшiя предписанiя. (*) Правительствующiй Сенатъ, по выслушиванiи сего указа, Приказали: О семъ Высочайшемъ Его Императорскаго Величества соизволенiи во всѣ Присутственные мѣста и Губернскiя Правленiя послать указы, которымъ предписать, чтобъ всѣ требованiя Совѣта, въ разсужденiи доставленiя свѣденiй, исполняемы были съ точнѣйшим наблюденiемъ Высочайшаго повеленiя и съ возможною поспѣшнастiю; въ Святѣйший же Синод и въ Московскiе Сената Департаменты сообщить вѣденiи. Указы посланы въ Апрѣле мѣсяцѣ.
