= Grigory Villamov =

Russian official (1773–1842)

Grigory Ivanovich Villamov
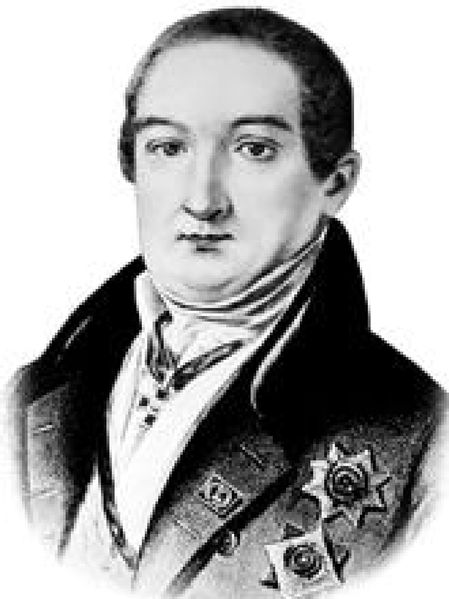

Secretary of State

Personal details
- Born: 8 January 1773 Saint Petersburg, Russian Empire
- Died: 7 February 1842 (aged 69) Saint Petersburg, Russian Empire

Grigory Ivanovich Villamov (Russian: Григорий Иванович Вилламов; 8 January 1773 – 7 February 1842) was the Secretary of State for the IV department of His Imperial Majesty's Own Chancellery, member of the State Council and Active Privy Councillor under Alexander I and Nicholas I.

== Sources ==
- Brockhaus and Efron Encyclopedic Dictionary: in 86 volumes (82 volumes and 4 additional). – Saint Petersburg, 1890–1907.
