= Ivan Durnovo =

Russian politician (1834–1903)

- Иван Дурново
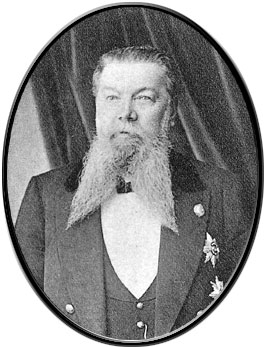

Chairman of the Committee of Ministers
- In office 1895–1903
- Monarch: Nicholas II
- Preceded by: Nikolai von Bunge
- Succeeded by: Sergei Witte

Ministry of Internal Affairs of the Russian Empire
- In office 1889–1895
- Monarchs: Alexander III; Nicholas II
- Preceded by: Dmitry Tolstoy
- Succeeded by: Ivan Goremykin

Personal details
- Born: 13 March 1834 in Kaluga Governorate
- Died: 11 June 1903 (69) in Berlin
- Resting place: Tikhvin Cemetery
- Relations: House of Durnovo

Ivan Nikolayevich Durnovo (Russian: Ива́н Никола́евич Дурново́, the patronymic is also transcribed as Nikolaevich; 13 March [O.S. 1 March] 1834 – 11 June [O.S. 29 May] 1903) was a Russian politician. He served as Chairman of the Committee of Ministers between 1895 and 1903, the precursor to the post of prime minister.

== Biography ==
Ivan Nikolaevich Durnovo was born on 1 (13) March 1834 in Kaluga Governorate to the noble Durnovo family. He attended Prince Michael Artillery Academy (Russian: Михайловская артиллерийская академия) in Saint Petersburg.

After a brief time in the military, he returned to civilian life and was elected by the nobility of his uyezd (district) to the position of the Marshal of Nobility. Later he occupied a similar position for the entire Chernigov Governorate. He served as the governor of Chernigov Governorate (1863–1870) and Yekaterinoslav Governorate (1870–1882). From 1882 he was in Saint Petersburg, starting as a Deputy Minister of Interior (1882–1886).

Although not a capable statesman, he was a good communicator, capable to earn trust of his superiors. Count Sergei Witte described him as "a pleasant Marshal of Nobility, a pleasant governor, a pleasant Deputy Minister of the Interior. But he was not a cultured or intelligent person; rather, one rather limited in his abilities. A hospitable, polite, and very cunning man."

On the Empress's recommendation, in 1886 Durnovo was appointed the chair of the Fourth Section of His Imperial Majesty's Own Chancellery, the office responsible for charitable institution and health care. In 1889, after the death of the Minister of Interior Dmitry Tolstoy, Durnovo was appointed to replace him.

In social policy, Durnovo's tenure in office saw a reduction of working hours in 1897. Durnovo was not known, however, for his innovations, but rather for following his predecessor's policies. His abilities were summarized by his staff in a pun, "Не нашли хорошего, назначили Дурново" (They could not find a good minister, so they have appointed a bad [durnogo = Durnovo] one!"). Durnovo was blamed by later researchers for failing to take decisive actions to handle the Russian famine of 1891–92.

In 1895, the next emperor, Nicholas II promoted Durnovo to the job of the Chairman of the Committee of Ministers. At the time, this was the top of the Russian bureaucratic ladder, as the separate position of the Prime Minister of Russia was not introduced until 1905. Durnovo was not to see that reform, though: he died on the job, on 29 May (11 June, in Gregorian Calendar) 1903, near Berlin. His leadership qualities, not entirely admired by his colleagues, earned him the nickname of "Veal's Head" (In Russian: "Телячья голова").

Political offices
Preceded by Dmitry Tolstoy	Minister of Interior; 1889–1895	Succeeded by Ivan Goremykin
Preceded by Nikolai Khristianovich Bunge	Chairman of the Committee of Ministers; 1895–1903	Succeeded by Sergei Witte
