= Ministry of the Navy (Russian Empire) =

Government ministry, 1802–1917

Naval Ministry of the Russian Empire
- Морское министерство Российской империи
- Naval ensign of the Russian Empire

- Lesser coat of arms of the Russian Empire

Agency overview
- Formed: 8 September 1802
- Dissolved: 25 October 1917
- Jurisdiction: Russian Empire
- Headquarters: Admiralty, Saint Petersburg
- Parent department: Council of Ministers

The Naval Ministry of the Russian Empire (Russian: Морское министерство Российской империи) was the central body of military management of the Imperial Russian Navy, was founded through the Manifesto on the Establishment of Ministries in 1802 during the reforms of Alexander I, during the establishment of ministries in the Russian Empire, under the name of the Ministry of Navy. The Imperial Russian Navy was the most expensive part of the armed forces, which led to the formation of the Ministry of Naval Forces as a new form of management of the Russian Empire. The ministry was subordinated to the Council of Ministers of the Russian Empire.

== History ==
The name of the Naval Ministry was given to it in 1815. Initially, the Ministry only included the Naval Chancellery (1802) and the Department of the Minister of the Naval Forces (1803). In 1805, the Main Admiralty Directorate was divided into the Admiralty Collegium and the Admiralty Department, with their annexation to the Ministry and the appointment of the Chairman of the Admiralty Collegium to the Minister of the Naval Forces.

In 1804, the General Kriegsrecht for the Navy was established, which was soon abolished due to the restoration of the General Auditorium for the naval and land armed forces, which was supposed to have two members from the Naval Department.

In 1812, the Auditorium Department and the Main Medical Directorate of the Naval Department were formed, represented by the Navy General Staff Doctor with an assistant, the General Staff Doctor.

Within the Naval Department, the Office of the Chief of Staff for the Naval Part was established, created in 1821.

In 1827 and 1828, the Office of the Naval Department was divided into two independent parts: the Naval Staff of His Imperial Majesty, headed by the Chief of Staff, which in 1831 was renamed the Main Naval Staff (GMSh) and the Naval Ministry, subordinate to the minister.

In 1836, both parts were combined into one institution, under the name of the Naval Ministry. Since 1855, the Naval Ministry was subordinated to the General Admiral, to assist whom the manager of the Naval Ministry was appointed. At the same time, the Admiralty Council, which previously had the character of an advisory institution and became the highest independent institution in economic matters, received a new organization.

Flag of the Minister of the Navy

In 1860, a new structure of the ministry was approved as a trial for 5 years, which, however, existed until 1885. According to it, the admiral general was the chief of the fleet and the naval department with the rights of a minister, but the economic part was managed by the manager of the naval ministry. The ministry included an office, an inspectorate, shipbuilding, commissariat and hydrographic departments, shipbuilding, technical and naval scientific committees, artillery, construction and medical departments. In 1867, a new reform was carried out: the admiral general became only the head of the naval department, while the manager of the ministry managed the entire ministry with the rights of a minister. With the increase in the power of the main commanders and port departments, the functions of the central economic bodies were reduced; Therefore, the shipbuilding and commissariat departments, the artillery and construction departments were abolished and in their place a Marine Technical Committee (MTK) was formed, which included the three previous committees (shipbuilding, technical and marine science).

In 1905, after defeat in the Russo-Japanese War, a number of changes were made to the ministry. On 2 June 1905, the General Admiral was relieved of his duties as the chief of the fleet and the naval department, and on 29 June, the Minister of the Navy was appointed, receiving equal rights with other ministers. In April 1906, the Naval General Staff was formed. At the same time, the operational management of the Main Naval Staff was abolished. The Main Naval Staff was subordinated to the minister, but its chief received the right to make a most humble report in the presence of the minister. The Naval General Staff functioned alongside the Main Naval Staff as the central governing body in the ministry. Following the October Revolution in 1917 and the establishment of the Soviet Navy, the Ministry of the Navy was liquidated and replaced with the Ministry of Naval Affairs of the RSFSR.

== General admirals ==
- Grand Duke Konstantin Nikolayevich
- Grand Duke Alexei Alexandrovich

== Ministers ==
=== Russian Empire government ===
- Nikolay Mordvinov (8 September - 28 December 1802)
- Pavel Chichagov (31 December 1802 - 28 November 1811)
- Jean Baptiste (28 November 1811 - 24 March 1828)
- Anton Moller (24 March 1828 - 5 February 1836)
- Alexander Sergeyevich Menshikov (5 February 1836 - 23 February 1855)
- Ferdinand von Wrangel (18 May 1855 - 27 July 1857)
- Nikolai Metlin (27 July 1857 - 18 September 1860)
- Nikolai Krabbe (19 September 1860 - 3 January 1876)
- Stepan Lesovsky (12 January 1876 - 23 June 1880)
- Aleksey Peshchurov (23 June 1880 - 11 January 1882)
- Ivan Shestakov (11 January 1882 - 21 November 1888)
- Nikolai Chikhachyov (28 November 1888 - 13 July 1896)
- Pavel Tyrtov (13 July 1896 - 4 March 1903)
- Theodor Avellan (10 March 1903 - 29 June 1905)
- Aleksei Birilev (29 June 1905 - 11 January 1907)
- Ivan Dikov (11 January 1907 - 8 January 1909)
- Stepan Voevodsky (8 January 1909 - 18 March 1911)
- Ivan Grigorovich (19 March 1911 — 28 February 1917)

=== Provisional Government ===
- Alexander Guchkov (2 March — 30 April 1917)
- Alexander Kerensky (5 May — 30 August 1917)
- Dmitry Verderevsky (30 August — 25 October 1917)

== See also ==
- People's Commissariat of the Navy of the Soviet Union
