= Council of Ministers of the Russian Empire =

Highest executive authority (1905–1917)

- Совет министров Российской империи
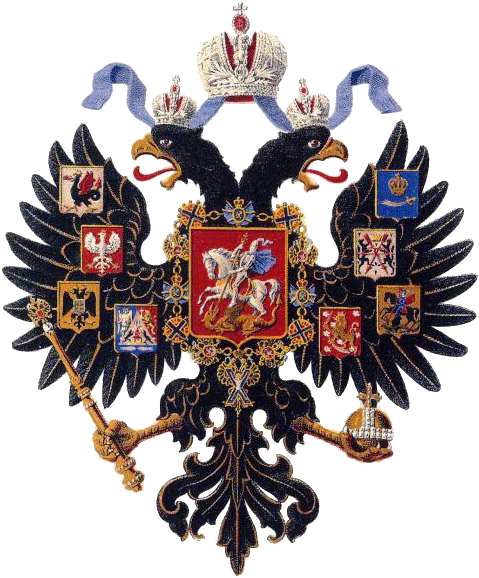

Agency overview
- Formed: October 19, 1905
- Preceding agency: Committee of Ministers
- Dissolved: February 27, 1917
- Superseding agency: Provisional Government
- Jurisdiction: Russian Empire
- Agency executives: Chairman of the Council of Ministers; Sergei Witte (first); Prince Georgy Lvov (last)

The Council of Ministers of the Russian Empire was the highest executive authority of the Russian Empire, created in a new form by the highest decree of October 19, 1905 for the general "management and unification of the actions of the chief heads of departments on subjects of both legislation and higher state administration". The ministers ceased to be separate officials, responsible to the emperor, each only for their actions and orders.

Earlier, in 1861, there was a body with the same name, chaired by the emperor, along with the Committee of Ministers. It considered cases that required not only the approval of the emperor, but also his personal presence in discussing them. The meetings were not regular and were appointed each time by the emperor.

After the February Revolution of 1917, it was replaced by the Provisional Government.

== Composition ==
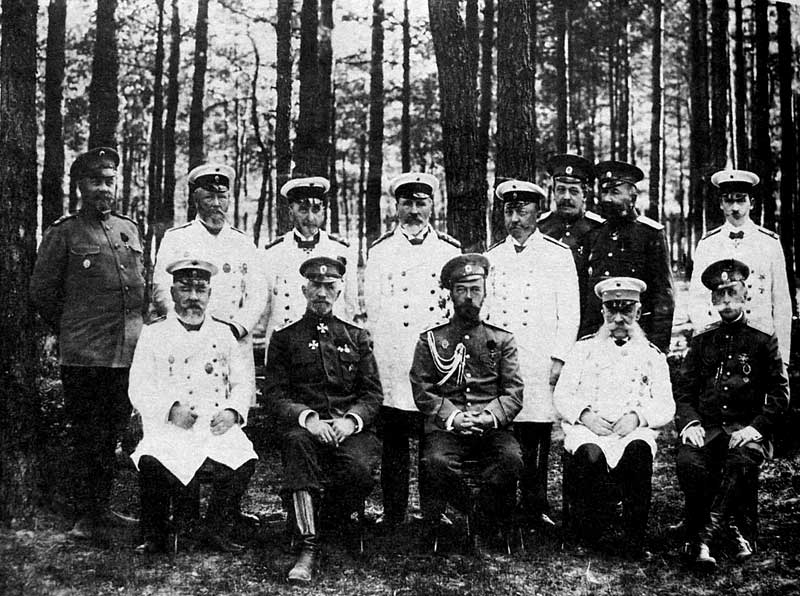
Council of Ministers in the Tsar's Headquarters, Baranavichy station, June 14, 1915. In the first row (left to right): • State Comptroller, Peter Kharitonov; • Supreme Commander of the Imperial Russian Army, Grand Duke Nikolai Nikolaevich; • Emperor Nicholas II; • Chairman of the Council of Ministers, Ivan Goremykin (also Prime Minister); • Minister of the Imperial Court and Destinies, Adjutant General Count Vladimir Frederiks. In the second row (left to right): • Minister of Internal Affairs, Prince Nikolay Shcherbatov; • Minister of Railways, Sergey Rukhlov; • Minister of Foreign Affairs, Sergey Sazonov; • Chief Administrative Officer of Land Management and Agriculture, Alexander Krivoshein; • Minister of Finance, Pyotr Bark; • Chief of Staff of the Supreme Command, General Nikolay Yanushkevich; • Minister of War, General Alexey Polivanov; • Minister of Trade and Industry, Prince Vsevolod Shakhovskoy

The Council of Ministers was chaired by the Chairman of the Council of Ministers.

The Council of Ministers included:

- Minister of Internal Affairs
- Minister of Finance
- Minister of Ways of Communication
- Minister of Foreign Affairs
- Minister of Justice
- Minister of Navy
- Minister of War
- Minister of Education
- Minister of the Imperial Court
- Maritime Minister
- Minister of Commerce and Industry
- Minister of Agriculture (until 1915 – Chief Governor of Agriculture and Land Management)
- State Comptroller
- Ober-Prosecutor of the Holy Synod

and others.

== Chairmen of the Council of Ministers ==
=== First period ===
1. Alexander II (1857—1881)

=== Second period ===
1. Sergei Witte (October 19, 1905 – April 22, 1906)
2. Ivan Goremykin (April 22 – July 8, 1906)
3. Pyotr Stolypin (July 8, 1906 – September 1, 1911)
4. Vladimir Kokovtsov (September 11, 1911 – January 30, 1914)
5. Ivan Goremykin, again (January 30, 1914 – January 20, 1916)
6. Boris Stürmer (January 20 – November 10, 1916)
7. Alexander Trepov (November 10 – December 27, 1916)
8. Nikolai Golitsyn (December 27, 1916 – February 27, 1917)

== History ==
=== First period ===
On November 24, 1861, the Council of Ministers was established in Russia as an advisory body on state affairs. Informally, the Council began to function since October 1857, and its first meeting was held on December 31, 1857.

The Council of Ministers was established for the "exclusive consideration in the Supreme presence of His Majesty" of cases requiring "general consideration", that is, belonging to several branches of government at the same time.

The Council of Ministers consisted of ministers and equivalent to them the chief administrative departments, the chairman of the State Council and the chairman of the Committee of Ministers, as well as other senior officials for the special purpose of the emperor. The Council was chaired by the emperor himself, who could introduce any questions for his consideration. All affairs were reported to the Council by the ministers by affiliation, and the clerical work was entrusted to the business manager of the Committee of Ministers. The Council of Ministers did not have its own office. At all meetings of the Council, the Secretary of State was present to present information on legislative matters from the affairs of the State Council. Meetings of the Council of Ministers were not regular and were appointed each time by the emperor.

The Council considered: "types and assumptions for the design and improvement of various parts entrusted to each Ministry and General Directorate", "information on the progress of work on the design and improvement ...", initial legislative assumptions followed by submission to the State Council, measures, requiring the general assistance of different departments, but not subject to consideration in other higher state institutions, information about the most important orders for each department, requiring "common co expressions ", the conclusions of the commissions created by the Emperor for the consideration of reports of ministries and main departments.

Since 1863, the number of cases submitted to the Council has sharply decreased, it gathered less and less, and after December 23, 1882, the meetings stopped altogether.

=== Second period ===
November 1, 1905 in accordance with the decree of Nicholas II "On measures to strengthen unity in the activities of ministries and main departments", the activities of the Council of Ministers were resumed. All ministries and main administrations were declared parts of the unified state administration.

The creation of the Council of Ministers in 1857–1861 did not lead to the emergence of a governing body capable of eliminating fragmentation and inconsistency in the actions of ministers and to ensure at least a relative unity of the activities of central government institutions. Since all power was concentrated in the hands of the Emperor, matters were decided mainly through the submission at the highest discretion of reports generally objectively incompatible with the principle of collegiality in management.

In 1905, in connection with the formation of the State Duma, the Council of Ministers was transformed. The reformed Council was entrusted with "directing and combining the actions of the chief heads of departments in subjects, both legislation and higher state administration".

The Council included the ministers of internal affairs, finance, justice, commerce and industry, means of communication, public education, military, maritime, imperial court and inheritances, foreign affairs, chief governor of land management and agriculture, the state controller and the chief procurator of the Synod. The heads of other departments participated in the meetings of the Council only in the consideration of cases directly related to the competence of their departments. The chairman of the Council of Ministers was not the emperor himself, as was previously the case, but the person appointed by him from among the ministers.

The office work of the Council of Ministers was conducted by its permanent office (in the 19th century, the office of the Council of Ministers was led by the office of the Committee of Ministers), headed by the head of the Council's affairs. Meetings of the Council began to be held regularly, several times a week and recorded in special journals.

The terms of reference of the Council of Ministers included: the direction of legislative work and preliminary consideration of the assumptions of ministries, departments, special meetings, committees and commissions on legislative issues submitted to the State Duma and the State Council, discussion of the ministerial proposals on the general ministerial structure and on the replacement of the main posts of higher and local government, consideration by the special orders of the emperor of affairs of state defense and foreign policy, as well as cases of the Ministry of the Imperial Court and the inheritance. In addition, the Council of Ministers had significant rights in the field of state budget and credit.

No general measure of control could be taken by the heads of departments other than the Council of Ministers, but the affairs of the state defense and foreign policy, as well as the affairs of the Ministry of the Imperial Court and the inheritances were removed from the Council’s jurisdiction – they were submitted to the Council of Ministers only for special reasons. the orders of the emperor or the heads of these departments. Outside the competence of the Council of Ministers was also the auditing activities of the State Audit Office, the Office of His Imperial Majesty, and the Office of His Own Imperial Majesty's for the institutions of Empress Mary.

In connection with the abolition of the Committee of Ministers in 1906, most of the functions left to the Committee passed to the Council of Ministers (introduction, extension and termination of the provisions on enhanced and emergency protection, designation of localities for the placement of exiles, strengthening the staff of the gendarmerie, the police, supervision of urban and local government, the establishment of companies, etc.). Later, in 1909, the so-called Small Council of Ministers was formed to consider these "committee cases".

The Council of Ministers ceased operations on March 12, 1917 during the February Revolution. The functions of the Council of Ministers as the highest body of government passed to the Provisional Government, which was formed on March 15, 1917. It is worth noting that, along with the abdication of the throne, Emperor Nicholas II signed a decree appointing George Lvov Chairman of the Council of Ministers (March 15, 1917), but the Provisional Government in its declaration indicated that power was taken from the Provisional Committee of the State Duma, leaving the decree of Nicholas without attention.

== Sources ==
Sources

- Hard Days (Secret Meetings of the Council of Ministers July 16 – September 2, 1915) // Archive of the Russian Revolution. – Berlin, 1926.
- Paul Ignatieff. The Council of Ministers in 1915–1916: (From Memories) // New Journal. – New York, 1944. – № 8–9.
- Special journals of the Council of Ministers of Tsarist Russia. 1906–1917 Publication. 1906 Part 1-5, 1982; 1907 Part 1-9, 1984–1985; 1908 Part 1-6, 1988.
- Council of Ministers of the Russian Empire, 1905–1906 .: Documents and materials, 1990.
- The Council of Ministers of the Russian Empire during the First World War. Papers of Arkady Yakhontov: recording sessions and correspondence. St. Petersburg: Dmitry Bulanin, 1999.
- Special journals of the Council of Ministers of the Russian Empire. 1909–1917 / responsible writer B. D. Halperin // M .: ROSSPEN, 2000–2009, 599 p. (1909), 494 s. (1910), 590 s. (1911), 486 p. (1912), 550 p. (1913), 698 p. (1914), 714 p. (1915), 658 p. (1916), 302 p. (1917). ISBN 5-8243-0008-9, 978-5-8243-0913-3.

Reference books and encyclopedias

- Council of Ministers
- Statehood of Russia: Dictionary reference. – Prince. 4: rr. – M., 2001. pp. 136–139.
- Council of Ministers // Three Centuries of St. Petersburg. Encyclopedia. In three volumes. Vol. II. 19th century, book 6, St. Petersburg, 2008. (Article of Mikhail Florinsky)

Literature

- Nikolay Eroshkin. The history of state institutions in pre-revolutionary Russia. – M.: Higher School, 1968. (3rd ed. – M., 1983; 5th ed. – Moscow: RSUH, 2008)
- Nikolay Eroshkin. Council of Ministers of Russia 1905–1917 – The government cabinet of autocracy // Eroshkin N.P. History of state institutions of pre-revolutionary Russia. – M .: RSUH, 2008. p. 531-563.
- Valentina Chernukha. Council of Ministers in 1857–1861 // Auxiliary historical disciplines. – L., 1973. T. 5. S. 120–137.
- Valentina Chernukha. The Constitution of the Council of Ministers (1861) // Auxiliary historical disciplines. – L., 1976. T. 8. P. 164-184.
- Valentina Chernukha. Council of Ministers in 1861–1882. // Auxiliary historical disciplines. – L., 1978. T. 9. S. 90–117.
- Valentina Chernukha. Tsarism’s domestic policy from the mid-50s to the early 80s. XIX century. L., 1978.
- Nadezhda Koroleva. The First Russian Revolution and Tsarism. The Council of Ministers of Russia in 1905–1907 M., 1982.
- Mikhail Florinsky. The crisis of government in Russia during the First World War. Council of Ministers in 1914–1917 L., 1988.
- Rafail Ganelin, Mikhail Florinsky. From Ivan Goremykin to Boris Stürmer: Supreme Power and Council of Ministers (September 1915 – January 1916) // Russia and World War I: Materials of international scientific. colloquium. SPb., 1999. p. 34-48.
- Sergey Makarov. Council of Ministers of the Russian Empire. 1857–1917: State and legal problems. SPb., 2000.
- Mikhail Florinsky. Council of Ministers of Russia in 1911–1914. (The Cabinet of Vladimir Kokovtsov) // Studies in Russian history: Collection of articles on the 65th anniversary of Professor Igor Froyanov, SPb .; Izhevsk, 2001. – p. 366-377.
- Council of Ministers (1857–1882, 1905–1917) // Administrative elite of the Russian Empire. The history of ministries. 1802–1917 / Ed. Nikolay Semenov. – SPb .: Faces of Russia, 2008. p. 603-662.
- Mikhail Florinsky. The Council of Ministers of Russia and the Military Ministry on the Eve of the First World War // Proceedings of the Faculty of History of St. Petersburg State University. Vol. 5: History of Russia: economics, politics, man. St. Petersburg., 2011. p. 244-251.
- Mikhail Florinsky. Review. on: Special journals of the Council of Ministers of the Russian Empire. 1906–1917. In 12 t. M .: ROSSPEN, 2000–2011 // Historical archive. 2012. № 3. – p. 191-197.
- Mikhail Florinsky. To the history of the Council of Ministers of the Russian Empire in 1906–1914. // Proceedings of the Faculty of History of St. Petersburg University. Issue 15. 2013. – p. 191-205.
- Mikhail Florinsky. Council of Ministers in the state-legal construction of the Russian Empire (July 1914 – February 1917) // World War I and the end of the Russian Empire: in 3 volumes. Vol. 1 (Political history). Chapter 2. – SPb .: Faces of Russia, 2014.
- Mikhail Florinsky. Evolution of the competence of the Council of Ministers of the Russian Empire during the First World War (July 1914 – February 1917) // Newest history of Russia / Modern history of Russia. 2014. № 3. – p. 116-131.
