= Manifesto on the Establishment of Ministries =

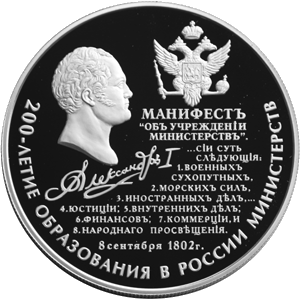
Coin of the Bank of Russia in honor of the 200th anniversary of the formation of ministries in Russia

The Manifesto on the Establishment of Ministries was the first act of the ministerial reform of 1802–11, regulating the activities of sectoral management bodies in the Russian Empire. Published on September 8, 1802 by Emperor Alexander I.

== Overview ==
The manifesto instituted eight ministries:

1. Ministry of War;
2. Maritime Ministry;
3. Ministry of Foreign Affairs;
4. Ministry of Justice;
5. Ministry of the Interior;
6. Ministry of Finance;
7. Ministry of Commerce;
8. Ministry of National Education.

The new executive bodies were the Ministry of the Interior and the Ministry of National Education.

It was proclaimed that each minister will have an instruction that will precisely determine the scope of his authority. All questions exceeding the ministerial power were resolved by the emperor, on the basis of a ministerial report on this issue.

== Reasons for the adoption of the manifesto ==
The work of sectoral authorities – collegiums created under Peter the Great, did not satisfy the urgent needs of the new century. First, over the course of the 18th century, the number of collegiums increased significantly as compared with the era of Peter's reign: these bodies often replaced each other, since the same function was assigned to several collegiums at once. Sometimes the opposite — any function remained outside the jurisdiction of the collegium. 9 collegiums, 2 institutions that had the status of collegiums, the office of the procurator-general, which concentrated management of internal affairs, justice and finance, and about 14 other collegiate institutions, as well as 10 central institutions of the court administration, directly subordinate to the emperor, were cumbersome and poorly managed array.

These institutions, which had arisen throughout the 18th century and still continued to operate by 1801, according to the apt remark of the Soviet historian Anatoly Chernov, "... did not develop into centralized branches of government. Their internal structure was distinguished by uncertainty and non-uniformity". The legal status of many institutions was also controversial, which gave rise to the uncertainty of the very type of these institutions (that is, the impossibility of their legal identification).

Secondly, the collegiums lacked the personal responsibility of specific individuals – all decisions were taken collectively.

The Manifesto on the Establishment of Ministries reflected the new requirements for government:

1. Personal responsibility of managers and performers;
2. The formation of new sectoral bodies — the ministries, which number was eight. This numerical reduction, as compared with the "proliferated" institutions, allowed to increase the efficiency of the institutions.

== Significance of the manifesto ==
The manifesto was an important stage in overcoming the crisis of public administration, in reforming the system of central government in Russia. It was the basis for the most important document – the "General Institution of Ministries", which more clearly defined the ministerial powers.

== Sources ==
- Isaev, Igor (2006). History of state and law of Russia.
- Titov, Yuri (2006). History of state and law of Russia.
