= Ministry of Internal Affairs of the Russian Empire =

Russian home ministry

- Russian: Министерство внутренних дел Российской империи

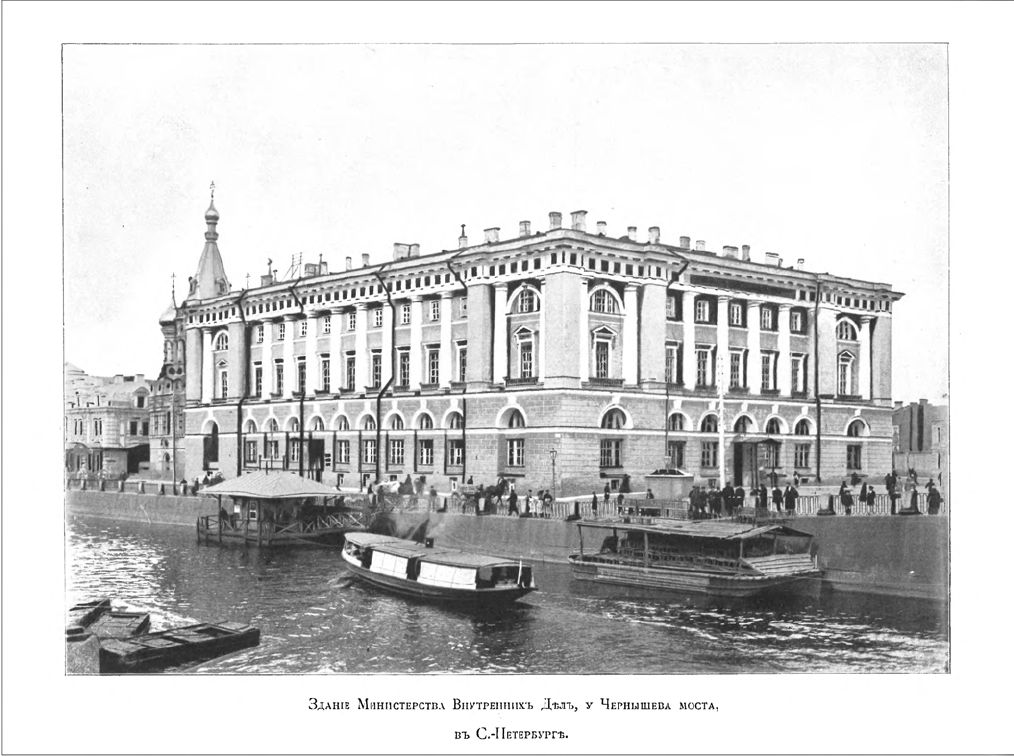

Agency overview
- Formed: September 8, 1802
- Preceding agency: Ministry of Police of the Russian Empire
- Dissolved: November 8, 1917
- Superseding agencies: Ministry of Internal Affairs of the Russian Republic; Cheka
- Jurisdiction: Council of Ministers of the Russian Empire
- Headquarters: 57, Fontanka River Embankment, Saint Petersburg, Russian Empire
- Ministers responsible: Viktor Kochubey, first; Alexander Protopopov, last
- Child agency: Police Department of Russia

The Ministry of Internal Affairs of the Russian Empire (Russian: Министерство внутренних дел Российской империи, romanized: Ministerstvo vnutrennikh del Rossiyskoy imperiyi) was the state executive authority of the Council of Ministers of the Russian Empire, which carried out administrative functions in the areas of state security, public security, law enforcement, leadership of local authorities, the fight against crime, protection of places of deprivation of liberty, the licensing system, and censorship in media and book publishing.

The Ministry of Internal Affairs of the Russian Empire concentrated in its hands a wide variety of tasks, both of the security police and the welfare police.

== History ==
On, 20 [O.S. 1802] September, the manifesto published by Alexander I named “On the establishment of ministries” was approved. Along with others ministries, the Russian Ministry of Internal Affairs was also created. The first Minister of Internal Affairs was Count Viktor Kochubey. The Deputy Minister became Count Pavel Stroganov.

According to Count Speransky, the ministry should have been in charge of the country's productive forces while being completely alien to the functions of the security police. This character of the Ministry of Internal Affairs changed with the accession of the Ministry of Police in 1819.

Subsequent changes in the overall result expanded the competence of the Ministry of Internal Affairs, although it partially narrowed. So, in 1826, the "special office" of the former Minister of Police was allocated to an independent III department of His Imperial Majesty's Own Chancellery; the care of the state and national economy was partly left to the ministries of finance and state property. On the other hand, in 1832, the main department of spiritual affairs of foreign confessions was attached to the Ministry of Internal Affairs, in the form of a department, in 1862 censorship was transferred to the Ministry of Internal Affairs, in 1865, when the Ministry of Railways was transformed, it was the building police, in 1868 it included the abolished Ministry of Posts and Telegraphs of the Russian Empire, the management of which before, until 1830, was also part of the Ministry of Internal Affairs.

In 1880, the former third branch of the His Imperial Majesty's Own Chancellery was attached to the Ministry of Internal Affairs and the minister was entrusted with the administration of the gendarme corps as chief of the gendarmes. Since 1843, the Ministry of Internal Affairs has been in charge of the statistical department; in 1861, a special Zemsky department was formed under it; the provision of July 12, 1889 on zemstvo district commanders granted him judicial and judicial oversight functions. Head of the prison part was transferred in 1895 from the Ministry of Internal Affairs to the Ministry of Justice. In 1880, a special Ministry was formed, combining such diverse parts as the post office and the spiritual affairs of foreign confessions; but the very next year it was abolished, and its affairs were returned to the Ministry of Internal Affairs.

The special position of the Ministry of Internal Affairs among other ministries is determined not only by the multiplicity, variety and importance of its functions, but also by the fact that it is primarily responsible for the police, and the compulsory implementation of all orders of the government in general, no matter which ministry it refers to, was carried out, as a general rule by the police.

== See also ==
- List of interior ministers of Russia
- Ministry of Internal Affairs (Soviet Union)
- Ministry of Internal Affairs (Russia)

== Links ==
- "Министерство внутренних дел". Brockhaus and Efron Encyclopedic Dictionary: In 86 Volumes (82 Volumes and 4 Additional Volumes) (in Russian). St. Petersburg: F. A. Brockhaus. 1890–1907.
