= Office of the Institutions of Empress Maria =

Government office of charity in Imperial Russia

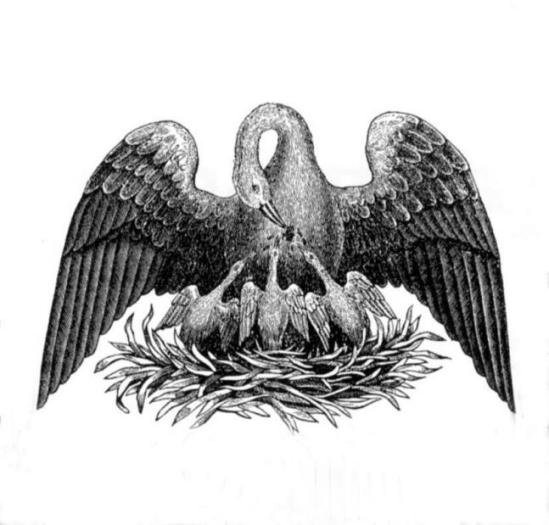
Emblem of the office

The Office of the Institutions of Empress Maria (Russian: Ведомство учреждений императрицы Марии) was the name of the Imperial government office of charity in Imperial Russia, and the 4th branch of His Imperial Majesty's Own Chancellery between 1828 and 1917.

The office was named after Empress Maria, who united her management of the Moscow Orphanage with that of the orphanage and the Foundling Hospital of St. Petersburg on 2 May 1797. The institutions managed orphanages, care of the invalids, the blind and the deaf, education for women and children, poor houses and hospitals, many of the institutions founded by the Empress.

After Empress Maria's death in 1828, it was incorporated into the Imperial Chancellery of the Tsar and given the name Office of the Institutions of Empress Maria in 1854. In 1880 it was renamed to His Imperial Majesty's Own Chancellery for Institutions of Empress Mary. The office was abolished in 1917, the year when the Russian Empire ended.

== History ==
The work of the office began in 1796, when Empress Maria Feodorovna took over the Smolny Institute of Noble Maidens. The Empress' Chancellery then consisted of six persons, headed by Grigory Ivanovich Villamov. Two days after the death of the Empress, Nicholas I of Russia, by decree of 26 October 1828, took all the institutions under her jurisdiction under his patronage. To manage them, the Fourth Department of His Imperial Majesty's Own Chancellery was formed.

Starting in 1858, the office sponsored a network of Mariinsky Girls' Gymnasiums in the empire.

== See also ==
- Institute for Noble Maidens
- Patriotic Society (Russia)

== Other sources ==
- Благотворительность и милосердие Санкт-Петербурга: Рубеж XIX—XX вв. / Авт.-сост. В. Н. Занозина, Е. А. Адаменко. —СПб., 2000.
- Lindenmeyr, Adele, Poverty Is Not a Vice: Charity, Society, and the State in Imperial Russia (Princeton: Princeton University Press, 1996)
