= Pavel Alexandrovich Stroganov =

Russian military commander and statesman

Count Pavel Alexandrovich Stroganov
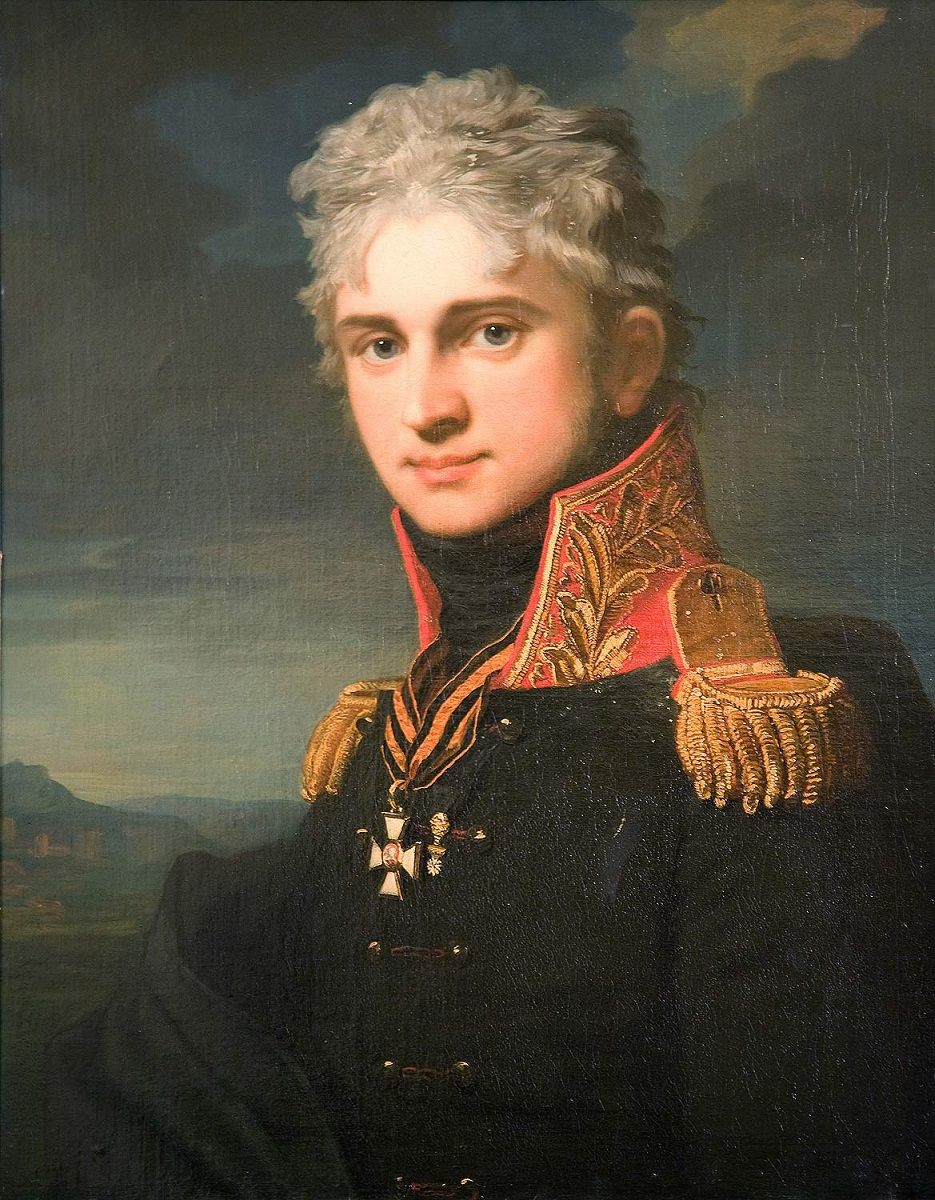
- Count Pavel Stroganov, by Jean-Laurent Mosnier, 1808

Representative of the Russian Empire to the United Kingdom of Great Britain and Ireland
- In office 10 May 1806 – 7 December 1806
- Preceded by: Semyon Vorontsov
- Succeeded by: Maximilian von Alopaeus

Personal details
- Born: 18 June 1774 Paris, Kingdom of France
- Died: 2 June 1817 (aged 42) Copenhagen, Denmark
- Resting place: Lazarevskoe Cemetery, St. Petersburg
- Spouse: Sophie Golitysn (after 1793)
- Children: 5

Military service
- Allegiance: Russian Empire
- Rank: Lieutenant General, Adjutant General
- Unit: Imperial Russian Army
- Battles/wars: War of the Third Coalition; War of the Fourth Coalition; Finnish War; Russo-Turkish War; Patriotic War of 1812; War of the Sixth Coalition
- Awards: Order of St. George; Order of Saint Anna; Order of Saint Vladimir; Order of Saint Alexander Nevsky

Count Pavel Alexandrovich Stroganov (Russian: Граф Павел Александрович Строганов; 18 June 1774 – 22 June 1817) was a Russian Imperial statesman from the noble house of Stroganov, renowned for his service during Tsar Alexander I's reign. He took part in the Privy Committee that outlined Government reform of Alexander I.

== Early life ==
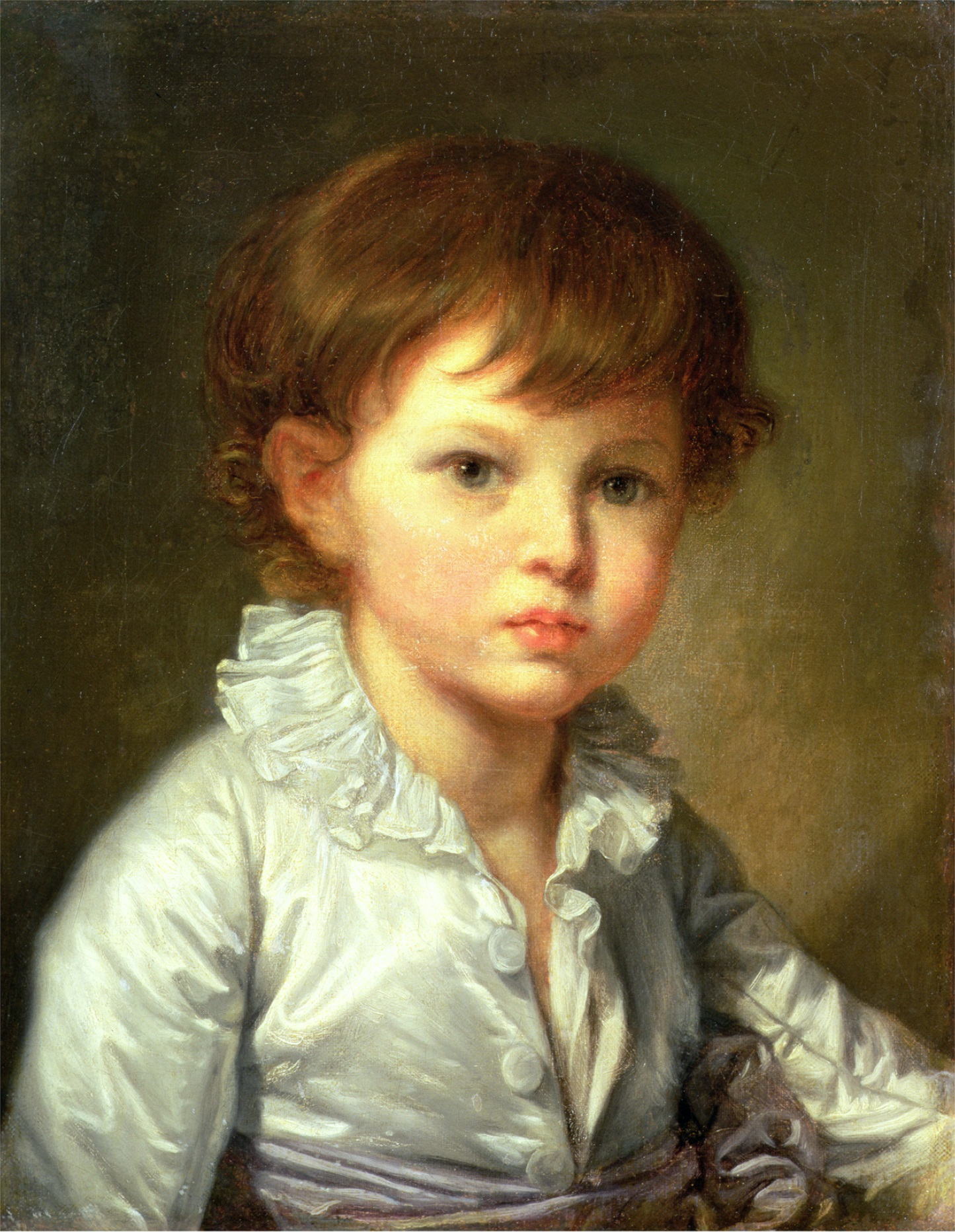
Portrait of Count Stroganov as a child, by Jean-Baptiste Greuze, 1778

Count Stroganov was born on 18 June 1772 in Paris, and was called "Popo" in his family. He was a son of Alexander Sergeyevich Stroganov and, his second wife, Princess Ekaterina Petrovna Trubetskaya (daughter of Prince Peter Nikitich Trubetskoy). His godfather was the Russian Emperor Paul I, and his childhood friend was the future Tsar Alexander I. His father was a Count of the Holy Roman Empire, who later became a Count of the Russian Empire. After his father's death in 1811, Pavel, as the only son, inherited his father's entire fortune.

At the time of his birth, his parents were living in Paris at the court of Louis XVI and Marie Antoinette, where they had moved following their 1769 marriage. In Paris, he was educated by Gilbert Romme, who had lived in Paris since 1774 and earned his living by teaching mathematics. After a ten-year stay in France, Stroganov's parents returned to St. Petersburg in the beginning of 1779. Shortly thereafter, they separated and his mother relocated to her Brattsevo Estate and took up with Ivan Rimsky-Korsakov, a former lover of Empress Catherine the Great. (Note: With Ivan Rimsky-Korsakov, his mother had four more children: Varvara, Vladimir, Vassily and Sophia, who were given the surname Ladomirsky (the name of an extinct Polish noble family), and were ennobled by an Imperial ukase in 1798. His half-sister, Varvara, married Ivan Dimitrievitch Narishkin, and was the grandmother of Prince Nikolai Borisovich Yusupov (1827–1891) and great-grandmother of Princess Zinaida Yusupova (1861–1939).) In order to hide the relationship from Pavel, his father sent him on a years long journey, both in Russia and abroad, with his tutor, Gilbert Romme.

== Career ==
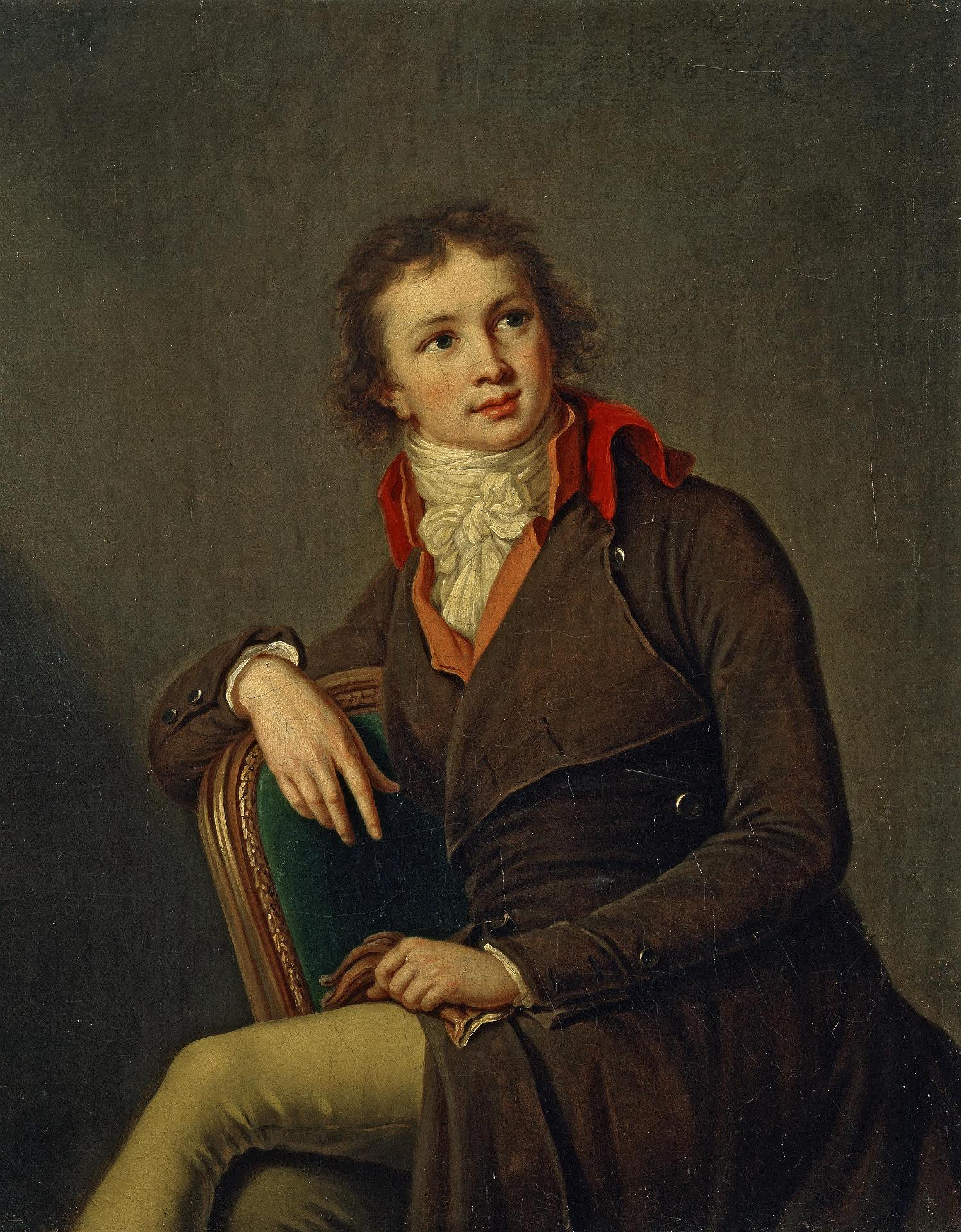
Portrait of Count Stroganov, by Élisabeth Vigée-Lebrun, 1790s

In 1779, the young Stroganov was enlisted for military service as a cornet of the Horse Regiment of the Life Guards and he received the rank of Second lieutenant of the Preobrazhensky Life Guards Regiment in 1786. At the time, Stroganov was serving under Prince Grigory Alexandrovich Potemkin, who gave him permission to leave Russia to complete his education. He left Russia, accompanied by Romme, the artist Andrei Voronikhin (who later became a famous architect), and his cousin, Grigory Alexandrovich Stroganov. From 1786 to 1789, they traveled all over Europe, visiting many European countries such as Switzerland, Italy, Austria, Prussia and France. He initially visited Riom, Romme's hometown, and from 1787 he began to study botany at the University of Geneva. Later, Stroganov took up the study of theology, as well as chemistry and physics. In addition, he practiced his German and took up various sports, most notably fencing and horseback riding. In his free time, he made trips to the mountains and was engaged in amateur mineralogy. At the end of May 1788, Romme and Count Stroganov left Switzerland, moving first to a house owned by Romme's mother in Auvergne, before visiting Creusot and Lyon, and moving to Paris, where the French Revolution was just flaring up. Pavel wrote to his father that they had gone to Paris in connection with the forthcoming convocation of the Estates General.

=== French Revolution ===
Stroganov arrival in Paris coincided with the election of Deputies to the National Assembly. At the insistence of his tutor, Stroganov changed his last name, did not mention his title anywhere and became known as Paul Ocher. In Paris, he continued to study, attending classes in military art and focusing on science. In May 1789, Stroganov and Romme began to visit Versailles regularly, where the Estates General met. Romme rented an apartment in Versailles, where he lived with Stroganov until the National Assembly moved to Paris.

On 10 January 1790, Romme established the Société des amis de la loi ("Society of Friends of the Law"), with Stroganov as librarian. In a letter dated 18 March 1790, Stroganov's father recommended that Romme take Pavel away from Paris, but Romme ignored the advice. On 19 June 1790, Romme organized an oath celebration in the ballroom attended by Stroganov, as well as later famous revolutionaries: Antoine Barnave, brothers Charles and Alexandre Lameth, Adrien Duport, Maximilien Robespierre, and Georges Danton. Stroganov's signature appears under the appeal of the "Society of Friends of the Oath in the Ball Game Hall", which was presented on 3 July 1790 to the National Assembly.

On 16 July 1790, Romme received a letter from Stroganov's father dated 20 June 1790 demanding he leave Paris. Before leaving, they managed to enroll Pavel in the Jacobin Club (under the name citizen Ocher; Romme joined three years later in 1793). On 10 August 1790, Pavel and Romme were issued passports to travel to Riom, before moving to Zhimo where Romme began to prepare for the elections. In November 1790, his cousin Nikolay Novosiltsev arrived in France to retrieve Pavel, likely because of his connection with the revolutionary Théroigne de Mericourt (who had been arrested by the Austrian government), and the two left for Russia in December 1790.

=== Political career ===
Upon his return to Russia, the young Count Stroganov was advised to settle in the Brattsevo estate near Moscow, where his mother lived, as he was forbidden to return to St. Petersburg. During this time, Stroganov was a member of the Preobrazhensky Regiment and by 1791 he was a lieutenant. By 1792, he was a Chamber-Junker. Stroganov returned to St. Petersburg at the end of Catherine's reign.

In 1795, Stroganov resumed communication with his childhood friend, Tsarevich Alexander, the future Emperor Alexander I, who told him that he was "an enthusiastic admirer of the French Revolution" and also considered himself a "Jacobin". Stroganov was alarmed by such sentiments of the Grand Duke, the count considered that Alexander was in the grip of "dangerous delusions" and turned to his cousin Novosiltsev to jointly protect Alexander from rash actions.

After the assassination of the Emperor Paul I in March 1801, and the accession of Alexander to the throne, Count Stroganov became a favorite of the new Emperor. In July of the same year, he presented the Emperor with his idea for the creation of a Privy Committee, that outlined plans for reforms in the country. As founder and member of the Committee, he was at the head of the triumvirate which included Prince Viktor Kochubey and Prince Adam Jerzy Czartoryski. In addition, he was a supporter of the abolition of serfdom in Russia.

In 1798, he was promoted to Chamberlain. From 1802 to 1807, he concurrently served as Privy Councillor, Senator, Vice-Minister of Foreign Affairs, and Assistant Minister of the Internal Affairs. In 1806, Alexander appointed him Chargé d'affaires and head of a diplomatic mission to London. Its mission was to promote rapprochement between Russia and the United Kingdom. Stroganov began negotiations with the British in an attempt to form a coalition against Napoleon. During negotiations, his friend, Prince Adam Czartoryski, resigned as Minister of Foreign Affairs, and Andreas Eberhard von Budberg, who had a deep dislike for Stroganov, became his successor. Stroganov's position became untenable so he left Great Britain in August 1806, returning to Russia. He resigned his position as Vice Minister of Foreign Affairs and his position of Senator in March 1807, but continued to play an important role as advisor to Emperor Alexander, who continued to seek his advice on diplomacy and military affairs.

=== Military career ===
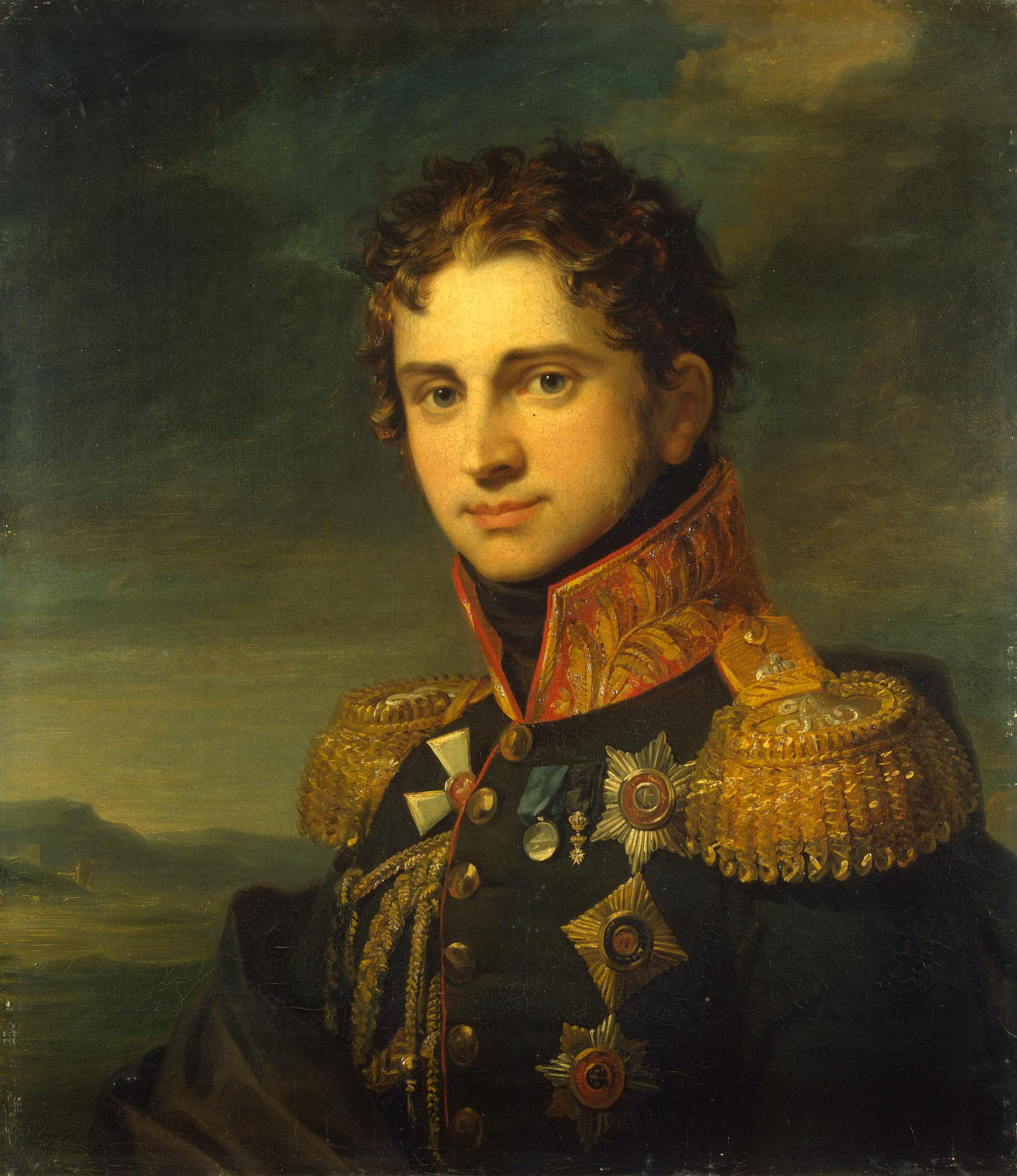
Count Pavel Stroganov, posthumous portrait by George Dawe, c. 1821–1825; Military Gallery of the Winter Palace

Count Stroganov accompanied Emperor Alexander in the campaign against Napoleon as part of the Third Coalition and became a participant in the 1805 Battle of Austerlitz which led to a French victory in which the Treaty of Pressburg precipitated an effective end of the Third Coalition and dissolved the Holy Roman Empire and creation of the Confederation of the Rhine.

In 1807, he headed the Cossack Regiment after entering as a volunteer. On 22 August August 1807, he was awarded the Order of St. George 3rd Class. On 21 December 1807, he was granted the rank of Major General, and on 27 January 1808, he joined the Izmailovsky Life Guards Regiment, taking part in the Finnish War of 1808 to 1809, serving under Gen. Prince Pyotr Bagration. He also took part in the capture of the Åland Islands.

From 1809 to 1811, he served in the Army of the Danube, participating in many battles with the Turks during the conflict between the Russian and Ottoman Empires. For courage shown in battles, he was awarded a gold sword with diamonds and the inscription "For Courage", the Order of Saint Anna, 1st Class, and Order of Saint Vladimir, 2nd Class (in 1809), and Order of Saint Anna, 1st Class (in 1810). On May 28, 1809, he was appointed Commander of the Life-Guards Grenadier Regiment and, at the same time, Brigade commander of the 1st Grenadier Division. On 15 November 1811, he was promoted to Adjutant General.

On September 7, 1812, during the Battle of Borodino, he commanded the 1st Grenadier Division, replacing General Nikolai Tuchkov, who had been wounded, as commander of the 3rd Infantry Corps. On 30 October 1812, he was promoted to Lieutenant General. As the head of the 3rd Infantry Corps, he took part in the Battles of Tarutino on 18 October 1812, Maloyaroslavets on 24 October 1812, and Krasnoi from the 15 to 18 November 1812. From the 16 to 19 October 1813, he participated in the so-called Battle of the Nations near Leipzig, for which he was awarded the Order of Saint Alexander Nevsky. He also led Russian troops during the assault on the Stade fortress near Hamburg.

In 1814, during a campaign in France, he commanded a Corps at the Battle of Craonne during the War of the Sixth Coalition. For this battle, on 23 April 1814, he was awarded the Order of St. George, 2nd Class. On 23 February 1814, during the Battle of Craonne, his 19-year-old son Count Alexandre Pavlovich Stroganov, was decapitated by a cannonball. Reportedly, after the tragedy, Count Stroganov plunged into deep melancholy and began to lose interest in life. For two days he searched the battlefield for the body of his son before returning to Russia with his body. Later, on 3 September 1814, he led the 2nd Guards Infantry Division.

=== Later years and legacy ===
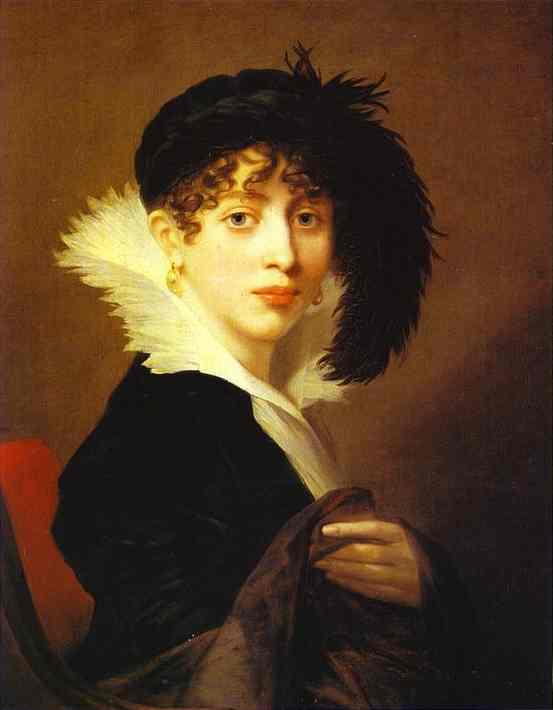
Countess Sophia Stroganova, by Jean-Laurent Mosnier, 1808

In 1816, as his eldest son and male heir had died, and not wanting to split up the family estate between his four daughters, Count Stroganov and his wife, asked Emperor Alexander I to make their estate a Majorat. On 11 August 1817, two months after his death, an Imperial decree from the Senate, declared that all real estate of the late Count Stroganov in the Perm, Nizhny Novgorod and Saint Petersburg forever passes in its entirety from one person into the possession of another.

After the death of her husband, the Stroganov lordship was ruled by his widow. In 1833, the Stroganovs' Majorate of Perm, which comprised 1,551,625 acres of land, on which there were 57,778 male serfs, and 67,312 female serfs, and "was divided into five districts: Ilyinsky (with an area of 397,638 dessiatines), Novousolsky (331,548 dessiatines), Ochersky (361,142 dessiatines), Invensky (390,179 dessiatines), and Bilimbaevsky (71,118 dessiatines).

After the death of his widow in 1845, their eldest daughter Natalia Pavlovna inherited the Perm primacy, who issued a power of attorney to her husband Sergei Grigoryevich Stroganov to manage the primacy. For another daughter, Adelaïda Pavlovna, a Majorat was established on the basis of the Maryino Estate, which passed into the Golitsyn family.

== Personal life ==
On 6 May 1793, Stroganov married Princess Sophie Golitsyna at the Brattsevo Estate. Princess Golitsyna was a daughter of Prince Vladimir Borisovich Golitsyn and his wife Countess Natalya Chernyshyova. Together, they had five children, one son and four daughters:

- Alexandre Pavlovitch Stroganov (1794–1814), who was killed at the Battle of Craonne during the War of the Sixth Coalition.
- Natalia Pavlovna Stroganova (1796–1872), sole heir to the Stroganov estates; she married her cousin Count Sergei Grigoryevich Stroganov (1794–1882) in 1818.
- Adelaïda Pavlovna Stroganova (1799–1882), who inherited Maryino Estate from her mother in 1845; she married Prince Vassili Sergueïevitch Golitsyn (1794–1836) in 1821.
- Elizaveta Pavlovna Stroganova (1802–1863), who married Prince Ivan Dmitrievitch Saltykov (1797–1832).
- Olga Pavlovna Stroganova (1808–1837), who married Count Pavel Karlovitch Fersen (1800–1884).

Count Stroganov died of consumption on 22 June 1817 while on a ship on his way to Copenhagen. His remains were returned to Russia and he was buried at Lazarevskoe Cemetery in St. Petersburg.

== In popular culture ==
According to the cookbook, A Taste of Russia, the original Beef Stroganoff recipe derived from a basic French mustard for seasoning beef, combined with a dollop of Russian sour cream, and named after Count Stroganov by his chef.

Diplomatic posts
Preceded by Semyon Vorontsov	Russian Ambassador to the United Kingdom (Chargé d'affaires); 10 May 1806 – 7 December 1806	Succeeded by Maximilian von Alopaeus
