= Viktor Kochubey =

Russian statesman and close aide of Alexander I of Russia

Prince Viktor Pavlovich Kochubey
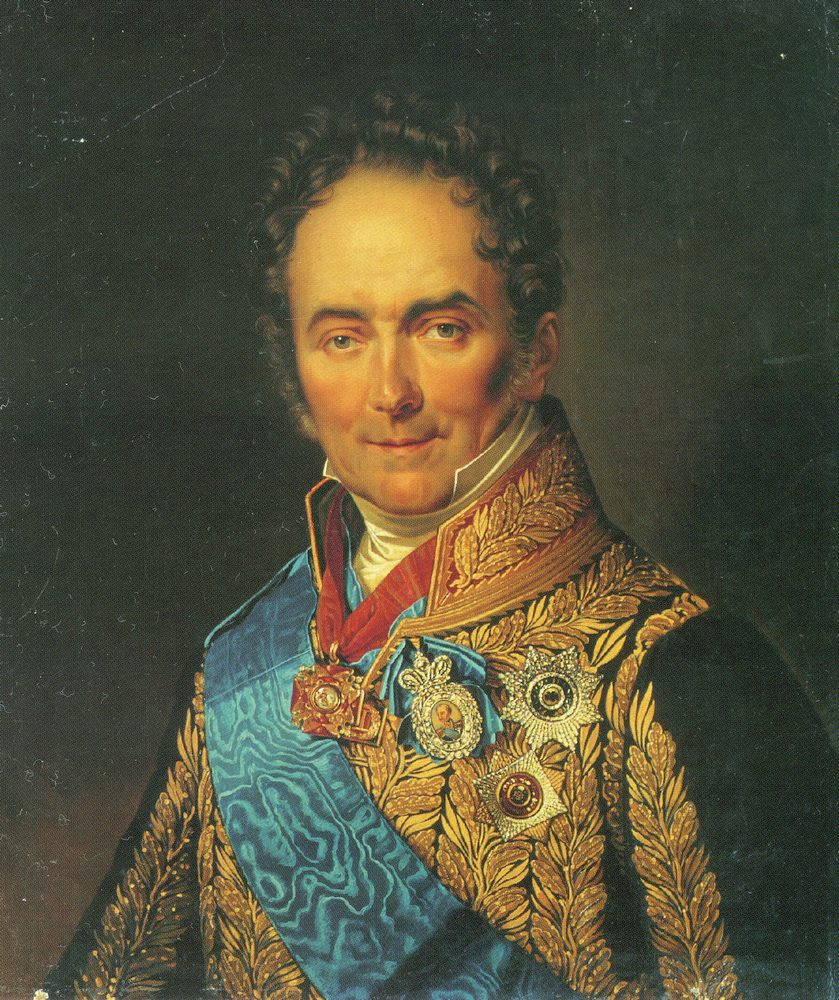
- Portrait by Franz Krüger, 1832

10th Chancellor of the Russian Empire
- In office 4 May – 15 June 1834
- Monarch: Nicholas I
- Preceded by: Nikolay Rumyantsev
- Succeeded by: Karl Nesselrode

4th Chairman of the Committee of Ministers of the Russian Empire
- In office 11 May 1827 – 15 June 1834
- Monarch: Nicholas I
- Preceded by: Pyotr Lopukhin
- Succeeded by: Nikolay Novosiltsev

4th Chairman of the State Council of the Russian Empire
- In office 11 May 1827 – 15 June 1834
- Monarch: Nicholas I
- Chairman of the Committee of Ministers: Himself
- Preceded by: Pyotr Lopukhin
- Succeeded by: Nikolay Novosiltsev

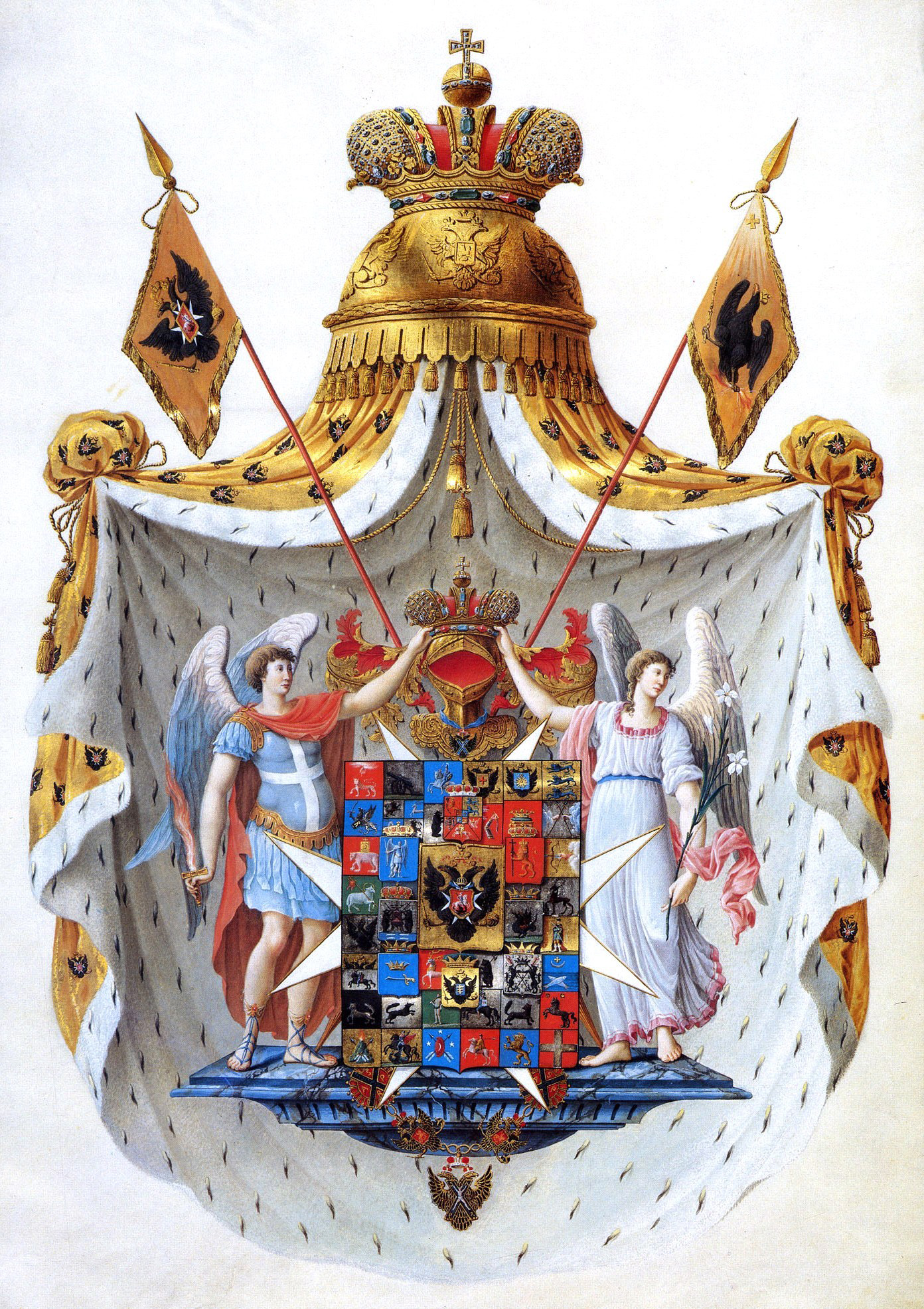
1st and 5th Minister of Interior of Russian Empire
- In office 20 September 1802 – 6 December 1807
- Monarch: Alexander I
- Chairman of the Committee of Ministers: Alexander Vorontsov; Adam Jerzy Czartoryski; Andreas Eberhard von Budberg
- Preceded by: Ministry established
- Succeeded by: Aleksei Kurakin
- In office 16 November 1819 – 11 July 1823
- Monarch: Alexander I
- Chairman of the Committee of Ministers: Pyotr Lopukhin
- Preceded by: Alexander Golitsyn
- Succeeded by: Balthasar von Campenhausen

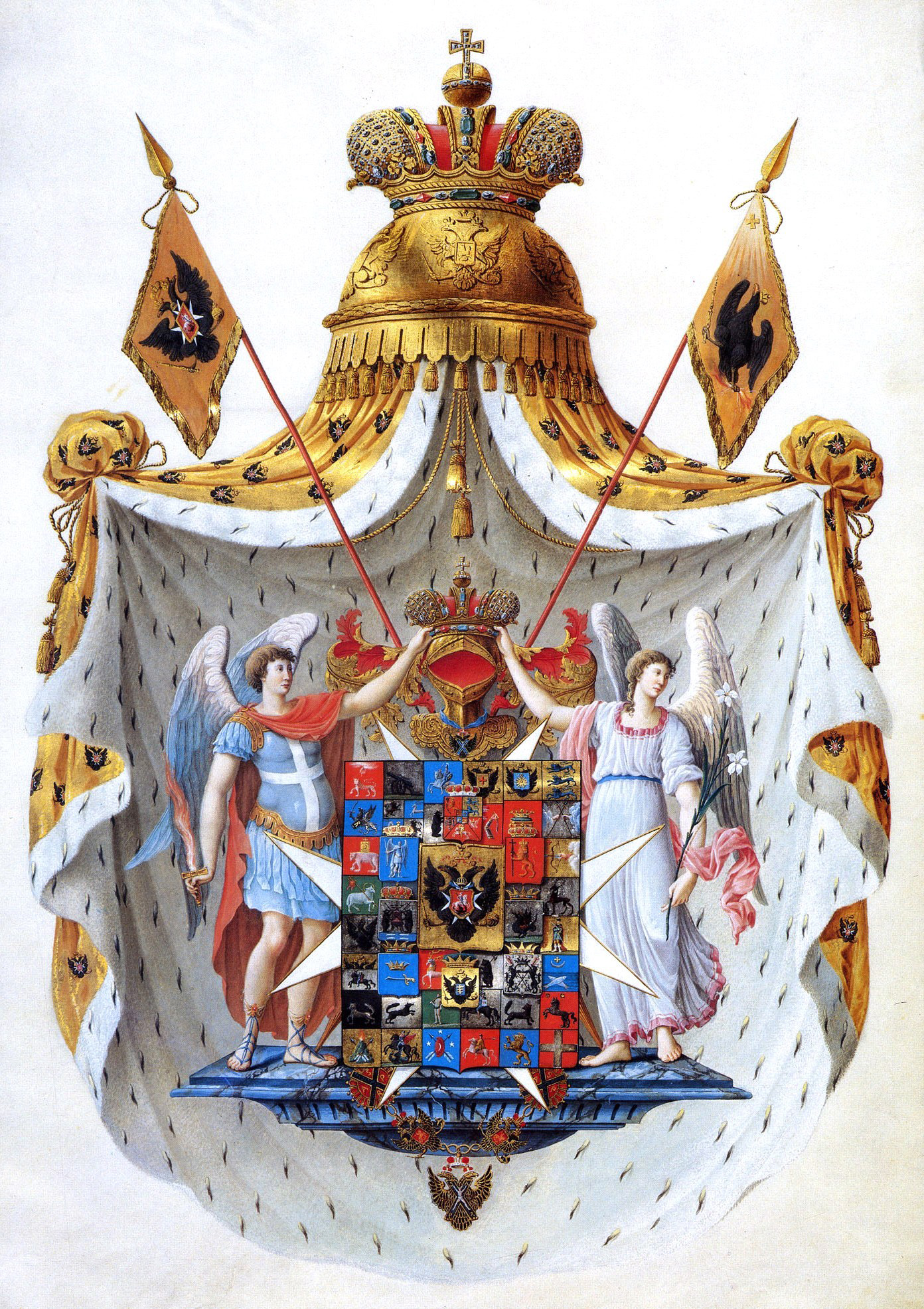
11th President of the Collegium of Foreign Affairs
- In office 12 October 1801 – 20 September 1802
- Monarch: Alexander I
- Head of Council Affairs at the Highest Court: Ivan Andreyevich Weydemeyer
- Preceded by: Nikita Panin
- Succeeded by: Alexander Vorontsov (as Minister of Foreign Affairs)
- Born: Viktor Pavlovich Kochubey; November 22, 1768; Dykanka
- Died: June 15, 1834 (aged 65); Moscow
- Burial: Lazarevskoe Cemetery
- Russian: Виктор Кочубей
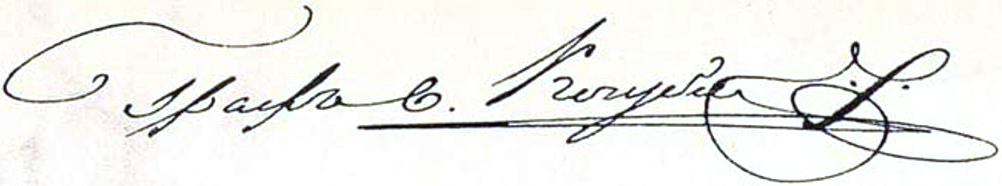
- Signature

Prince Viktor Pavlovich Kochubey (Russian: Князь Ви́ктор Па́влович Кочубе́й); (22 November [O.S. 11 November] 1768 – 15 June [O.S. 3 June] 1834) was a Russian statesman and close aide of Alexander I of Russia. Of Ukrainian Zaporozhian Cossack origin, he was a great-grandson of Vasily Kochubey. He took part in the Privy Committee that outlined Government reform of Alexander I. He served in London and Paris embassies as counsel, then as Ambassador to Turkey. In 1798 he was appointed to the board of College of Foreign Affairs and was made Count next year, but then Paul I of Russia exiled him. At the start of the reign of Alexander I, he joined the liberal Privy Committee that outlined Government reform of Alexander I. He was the Minister of Foreign Affairs in 1801–1802 and also Minister of the Interior until 1812, then in 1819–1825. Since 1827 he was the President of the State Council and Chairman of the Committee of Ministers. In 1834, he was granted the rank of Chancellor of the Russian Empire.

== Biography ==
=== Early years ===
Kochubey was born in Poltava province, in the ancestral homestead of Dykanka, in the family of Pavel Kochubey (1738–1786) and Ulyana Andreevna Bezborodko (1742–1777). The great-grandson of the general scribe Vasily Kochubey, who was executed in 1708 on charges of denunciation of myrmidon in the pursuit of treason.

Pavel Kochubey, who headed the Poltava court, gave his sons the ancient names of Apollo and Victor. Their childless uncle Alexander Bezborodko, who was actually in charge of Russia's foreign policy at the time, took care of their upbringing and education. In 1775 he invited his nephews to St. Petersburg.

Viktor studied at the private boarding House de Villeneuve, at the same time in 1776 was recorded for service in the Preobrazhensky Lab-Guard regiment. Bezborodko destined for his nephew's diplomatic career. To finish his education, he was sent to Geneva, where he was under the supervision of Italinsky.

In 1784, Kochubey briefly served as an adjutant of Potyomkin. In the same year, he began his diplomatic career in the Russian mission in Sweden. He found time to attend lectures at Uppsala Universitet.

In September 1786 he received the court title of chamber-junker and was a member of Catherine II's entourage during her trip to Crimea.

=== Early career ===
In 1788 he was assigned to a mission in London under the direction of Count Vorontsov. Having been allowed to travel to Europe to continue his education, he visited Switzerland, Holland and France.

In early 1791, against the will of Bezborodko, he made a trip to Paris, where he listened to lectures by Jean-Francois de La Harpe and watched the events of the revolution. In the same year he participated in the signing of the Yas peace. In 1792 he became close to the Grand Duke Alexander Pavlovich.

From October 11, 1792, to 1797, he was an extraordinary envoy to Constantinople.

The accession to the throne of Paul I did not entail the disgrace of Bezborodko (as happened with the majority of people who used the location of the late Empress) and therefore, in October 1798, his protege and nephew became vice-chancellor and vice-president of the College of Foreign Affairs. At the age of thirty he was made into active secret advisers, and on April 4, 1799 he was elevated to the counties dignity of the Russian Empire.

As a diplomat, Kochubey held on to a 'national system based on Russia's good,' wanted 'all powers to cherish its friendship' and fear territorial increments. He was a supporter of strengthening relations with the Ottoman Empire.

In September 1799, immediately after the death of his uncle, Kochubey became disunity and he was exiled to the village: the emperor wanted to marry himself in favor to Anna Lopukhina, but married Maria Vasilchikova instead.

In the spring of 1800 he went abroad, but after receiving the news of the death of Paul I in Dresden, he returned to St. Petersburg in April 1801.

Upon his accession to the throne, Alexander I was appointed as president of the College of Foreign Affairs and a senator in June 1801. Much more important was the fact he became one of the closest advisers to the emperor and joined the Unspoken Committee, designed to prepare the transformation of the state system of Russia.

On December 12, 1801, Count Kochubey was appointed a member of the Essential Council, and on September 8, 1802, he became the first Minister of the Interior of Russia.

When discussing the peasant issue, he opposed the liberation of peasants without land and the practice of transferring them to the yard; the same position was defended in the Committee on the Arrangement of The Aesthetic and Lifland Peasants, of which Kochubei had been chairman since 1803. In the area of political transformation, Kochubey advocated the separation of powers while maintaining the inviolability of autocracy.

In the early 19th century, the Ministry of the Interior was responsible for economic and transport issues. Kochubey focused on the development of the newly annexed southern lands and spared no expense for the development of Novorossiya, especially Odessa. He presented a report on the shortcomings of the southern lands of Russia to the previous emperor.

Kochubey was one of the first to notice Speransky's talent and brought him to his service. In 1806, during his illness, Kochubey sent Speransky instead of himself with a report to the emperor. This acquaintance was important for the history of Russia.

Moreover, Alexander I accumulated disagreements with 'young friends.' Anglophile Kochubey considered the conclusion of the Tilsit world the collapse of all Russian foreign policy, desisting the bloody wars of the previous years, and several times asked the emperor to resign. But only his fourth request was granted, on November 24, 1807.

Upon his dismissal from his post as Minister, Kochubey sent 'circular letters to all the governors in which, breaking up with them, he thanked him for his hasty duties with their active work', and left as a private citizen to Paris, where he met with the Minister of Police, Fouche, and other figures of the First Empire.

=== 1810 War ===
After returning from vacation, in 1810 Kochubey joined the Council of State. In early 1812 he was appointed Chairman of the Department of Laws of the Council of State. Supported Speransky's proposal for financial reform and the Senate. He maintained a good relationship with him, even when the reformer was disgraced.

During the Patriotic War and the Overseas Campaign was under the emperor. He facilitated Kutuzov's appointment as commander-in-chief. In 1813 he headed the Central Council for the Management of German Lands. He was offered the position of ambassador to England, which he refused because he did not want to leave Russia at such a difficult time (liked to repeat that a long stay outside the fatherland was against his rules).

Filed to the Emperor 'Note of Gr. V. Kochubey on the state of the empire and measures to end the unrest and introduce a better arrangement in the various industries, the government constituents,' in which Kochubey proposed to merge the Ministry of Police with the Ministry of the Interior, as well as to create the Ministry of Spiritual Affairs and Public Education, prompted Alexander to appoint him in 1816 as chairman of the Department of Civil and Spiritual Affairs of the State Council (until 1819).

From 1817 to 1818 Count Viktor Kochubey lived in Paris.

He was second appointed Minister of the Interior on November 4, 1819. On August 30, 1821, he received a St. Andrew's star. In the same year, the emperor ordered to move to the semicircular square in front of his tsarist palace cast-iron gates with the inscription A mes chers compagnons d'armes ('To my beloved colleagues').

In 1819, Kochubey purchased a plot on the banks of the Fontanka from Prince Lobanov-Rostovsky and ordered the architect Montferran to build a mansion for his family. At the entrances and amateur performances in this house, there was the best of society. At the Carnival of 1827, M. I. Glinka sang here the women's part of Don Giovanni. The Kochubey balls became a proverb; they attracted the entire high aristocracy, as well as the imperial family.

On July 28 (August 9) 1821, Emperor Alexander I was established by the Siberian Committee and V. P. Kochubey became its first chairman.

During the four years in which Kochubey was running the ministry, the Department of Commerce and Manufacturers, to whom he was most interested, was removed from its membership, then the management of the communications routes was removed. Meanwhile, Kochubey was not happy about joining the functions of the former police ministry, as he was not involved in the investigation.

Having surrendered the ministry's management on February 25, 1823 (officially removed from office on June 28, 1823), Kochubey turned his attention to his youngest daughter's illness. After hearing the advice of doctors, the dignitary decided to take her not to foreign waters, but to the south of Russia, to Theodosia, which was then a wonder. With the onset of spring from St. Petersburg, he set off on the way with water, canals, then on the Volga descended to Tsaritsyn, from there he reached the Don on horseback and then again with water to Crimea; he spent the winter in Odessa.

On 6 December 1831 Viktor was granted the hereditary title of Knyaz in the Russian Empire by Nicholas I of Russia.

== Notes and references ==
Political offices
Preceded by Alexander Andreyevich Bezborodko	Imperial Chancellor of Russia (acting); 1799	Succeeded by Nikita Petrovich Panin (acting)
