= Private Committee =

The Privy Committee (Russian: Негласный комитет; also referred to as the Unofficial Committee) was an unofficial consultative body during the reign of Alexander I in Russia.

The Private Committee was operational from June 1801 until late 1803. It comprised the closest associates of the tsar (the so-called "young friends"), including Count Pavel Stroganov, Prince Adam Jerzy Czartoryski, Counts Viktor Kochubey and Nikolay Novosiltsev. Mikhail Speransky took an active part in the Committee, although he wasn't a formal member.

The Private Committee was a place for discussing many governmental undertakings, such as the Senate reform, establishment of ministries in 1802, and others. The committee paid much attention to the peasant issues and prepared a few edicts with regard to this, such as decrees on allowing merchants and petty bourgeois (мещане, or meshchane) to acquire land (1801), on free bread ploughmen (вольные хлебопашцы, or volniye khlebopashtsy) (1803), and others.

== See also ==
- Government reform of Alexander I
