= Cherkutino =

Cherkutino Черкутино
- Selo
- Location within Vladimir Oblast Location within Russia
- Coordinates: 56°11′N 39°45′E
- Country: Russia
- Region: Vladimir Oblast
- District: Sobinsky District
- Time zone: UTC+3:00

Cherkutino (Russian: Черкутино) is a rural locality (a selo) and the administrative center of Cherkutinskoye Rural Settlement, Sobinsky District, Vladimir Oblast, Russia. The population was 1,002 as of 2010. There are 12 streets.

== Geography ==
Cherkutino is located 36 km northwest of Sobinka (the district's administrative centre) by road. Goryamino is the nearest rural locality.
