= Nikolay Novosiltsev =

Russian statesman (1761–1838)

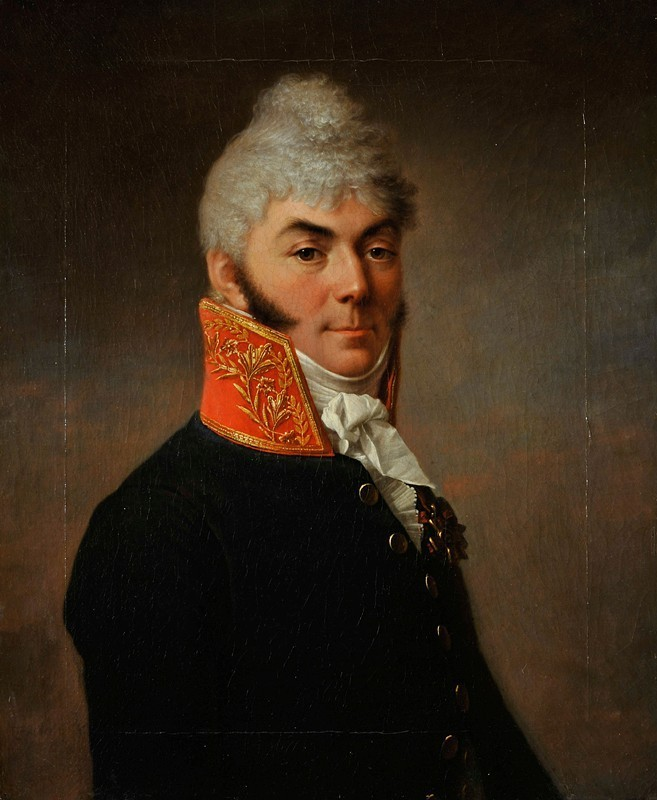
Nicholas Novosiltsev. Portrait by Stepan Shchukin

Count Nikolay Nikolayevich Novosiltsev (Novoselcev) (Russian: Граф Никола́й Никола́евич Новосельцев (Новоси́льцев); Polish: Nikołaj Nowosilcow) (1761–1838) was a Russian statesman and a close aide to Alexander I of Russia. Novosiltsev developed the State Charter of the Russian Empire (1820) under the supervision of Alexander.

== Life ==
He was a natural son of a wealthy nobleman, married to the aunt of Count Pavel Stroganov. This relationship secured for him a place in the Privy Committee that outlined the Government reform of Alexander I. He drafted a constitution for the Russian empire that mirrored the constitution suggested by Speransky; unlike Speransky's, Novosiltsev's constitutional suggestion had been accepted by Alexander but the plan was abandoned after Alexander's death in 1825.

In 1804 to 1805, Sweden, Russia, Britain, Austria, Prussia and the Kingdom of Naples planned to form a coalition against Bonaparte's France. Alexander I sent Novosiltsev to mediate in the negotiations between England and France after Napoleon made a peace offering to England when he learned of the anti-French coalition. Before leaving Berlin, Novosiltsev learned that Bonaparte had taken both Genoa and Lucca, and notified Alexander, ending the mediation towards peace in 1805.

From 1813 to 1815 he governed the finances of the occupied Duchy of Warsaw and between 1815 and 1830 he served in the government of the Congress Kingdom of Poland. In the Kingdom of Poland, he was the tsar's commissar at the Council of State. He was very influential, widely feared, and one of the de facto rulers of the country. He organized and led the Russian secret police there (okhrana). He was responsible for arrests of student activists in the Philomaths and Filaret Association in 1823. From 1824, he was curator of the Vilna Educational District. He was a supporter of Russification policies, persecuted many pro-Polish organizations and activists, and was detested by contemporary Polish society.

He concluded his career as the Chairman of the Cabinet of Ministers. Nicholas I made him a count in 1835.

== In popular culture ==
The character of count Novosiltsev appears as main antagonist in the drama Dziady part III by Adam Mickiewicz. The figure of the senator also appears in the film Chopin: Desire for Love (2002), directed by Jerzy Antczak. The role was played by Piotr Fronczewski.

Academic offices
Preceded by Ludwig Heinrich von Nicolay	President of the Russian Academy of Sciences; 1803–1810	Succeeded by Sergey Uvarov
