= Ministry of Finance of the Russian Empire =

Public Institution in the Russian Empire

- Russian: Министерство финансов Российской империи
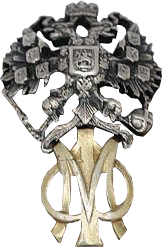

Agency overview
- Formed: September 8, 1802
- Preceding agency: Order of the Great Treasury
- Dissolved: March 3, 1917
- Superseding agency: Ministry of Finance of the Provisional Government
- Jurisdiction: Russia
- Parent agency: Council of Ministers

Ministry of Finance of the Russian Empire (Russian: Министерство финансов Российской империи) was one of the Russian Empire's central public institutions, in charge of financial and economic policy and subordinated to the Council of Ministers of the Russian Empire.

The ministry was established on 8 September 1802, and reorganized in 1810–11. By the end of the 19th century, it consisted of a:

- Ministerial Council
- General and Special Offices for Crediting
- Department of the State Treasury - controlling the movement of the funds and keeping the account for all the treasuries
- Department of Assessed contributions - for taxes and Zemstvo duties
- Department of Customs Duties
- Department of Railway Affairs
- Department of Unassessed taxes and for State sales of Spirits
- Central Weights and Measures Board
- Permanent Committees and Councils.

The ministry also published the Herald of Finance, Industry and Commerce.

== See also ==
- List of Finance Ministers of Imperial Russia
