= His Imperial Majesty's Own Chancellery =

His Imperial Majesty's Own Chancellery or H.I.M. Own Chancellery (Russian: Собственная Его Императорского Величества канцелярия, Собственная Е.И.В. канцелярия) began as personal chancellery of Paul I and grew into a kind of regent's office, run by Count Arakcheyev from 1815 and until the death of Alexander I of Russia.

Under Nicholas I, the Chancellery was transformed into a large administrative body, on par with the Committee of Ministers and the Governing Senate. Since 1826, the Chancellery was divided into several sections (sl. otdeleniye):

- First Section – preparation of the Majestic Decrees and Orders, control over its execution, gubernatorial and ministerial reports, petitions to the Sovereign, state service and its awards and decorations. It was run by the State-Secretary of His Majesty.
- Second Section – codification of the Imperial Legislation, publication of the codes. Mikhail Speransky was the first head of the Section.
- Third Section – political crimes, censorship, religious sects, aliens, Gendarmes, headed by General Benckendorf, who had been commander of the Guards under Alexander. He suggested the formation of a ministry of police and the overhaul of the whole system. They also exercised an increasingly repressive influence on education, especially after Uvarov's resignation.
- Fourth Section, 1828 – former Chancellery of Dowager Empress Maria Fedorovna; charity issues such as education of women, orphanage, disabled persons, healthcare
- Fifth Section, 1836 – state-owned serfs of St. Petersburg gubernia. Created to improve the poor administration of the state peasants. The aim was to make them more efficient producers, both for the benefit of the state as a whole and as an example for landowners to follow with their serfs. Pavel Kiselyov, another German who had been in Russian service since 1812, was placed at the head of the new section.
- Sixth Section, 1842 – Caucasian civil matters and development

Starting with 1880, the latter five sections were transferred to the corresponding Ministries, and in 1882, the First Section effectively became the Chancellery itself, serving as the personal office of the Tsar again.

== Sources ==
- "Собственная Его Императорского Величества канцелярия" . Brockhaus and Efron Encyclopedic Dictionary (in Russian). 1906.
