= Mikhail Speransky =

Russian reformist (1772–1839)

His Excellency Count Mikhail Speransky
- Михаил Сперанский
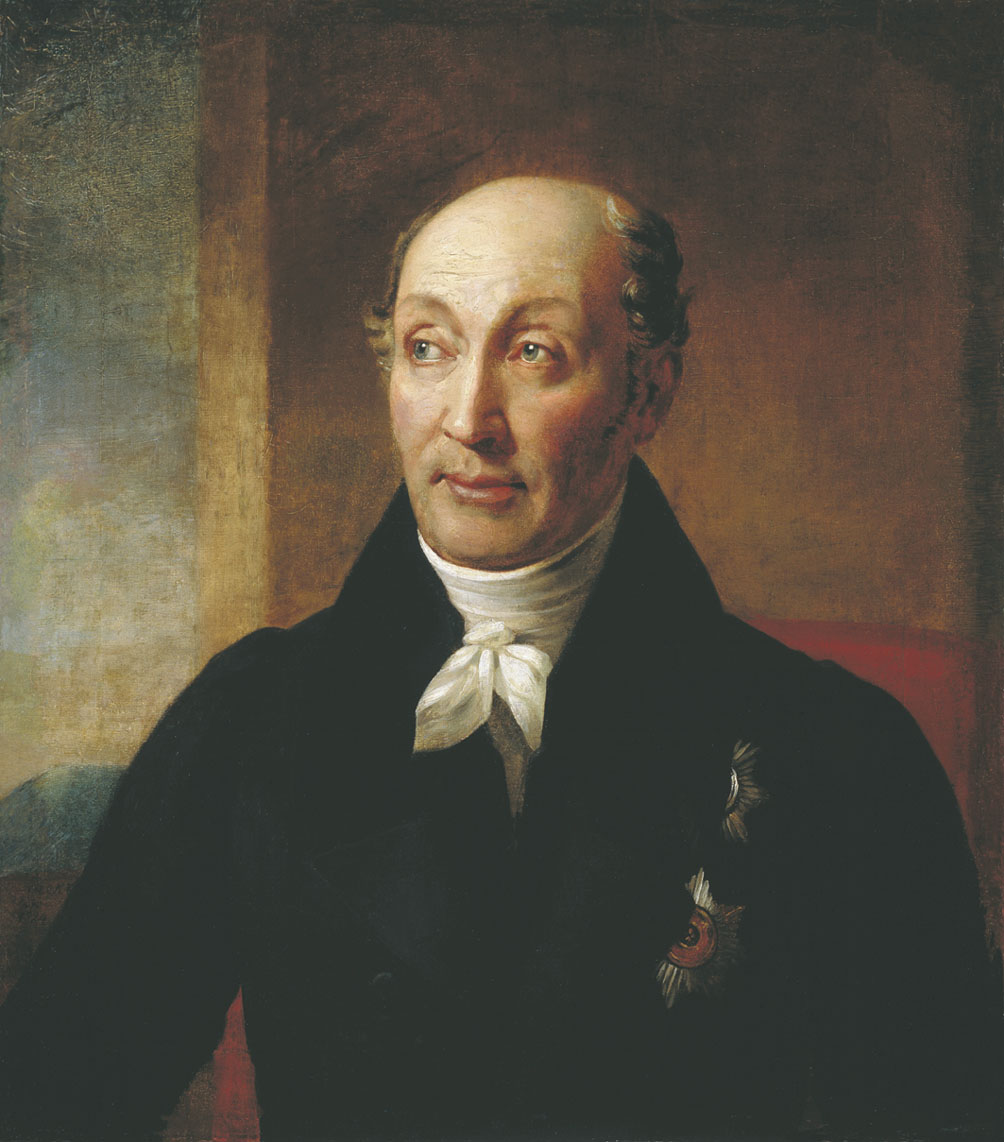
- Portrait by Alexander Varnek, 1824
- Born: Mikhail Mikhailovich Speransky; 12 January 1772; Cherkutino, Russia
- Died: 23 February 1839 (aged 67); St. Petersburg, Russia
- Other name: Michael Speransky
- Education: Vladimir Theological Seminary; Saint Petersburg Theological Academy
- Occupations: Reformer; Lawmaker
- Children: Elisabeth Bagréeff-Speransky
- Family: House of Speransky
- Honours: Order of St. Alexander Nevsky (1812); Order of St. Vladimir 1st Class (1826); Order of St. Andrew (1833)

State Secretary of the Russian Empire
- In office 13 January 1810 – 29 March 1812
- Monarch: Alexander I
- Preceded by: Office created
- Succeeded by: Alexander Semyonovich Shishkov

Count Mikhail Mikhailovich Speransky (Russian: Михаи́л Миха́йлович Спера́нский; 12 January 1772 – 23 February 1839) was a Russian statesman and reformist during the reign of Alexander I of Russia, to whom he was a close advisor. Honorary member of the Free Economic Society (1801) and the St. Petersburg Academy of Sciences (1819). He later served under Tsar Nicholas I of Russia and was Active Privy Councillor (1827). Speransky is referred to as the father of Russian liberalism.

== Personal life ==
Speransky was born on 12 January 1772 in Cherkutino, Vladimir Province (now Vladimir Oblast), Russia.

Speransky was the son of Mikhail Tretyakov, a village priest. He studied at the religious seminaries in Vladimir and St Petersburg, where he acquired the surname of Speransky, from the Latin verb "to hope" (sperare). Later, in the ecclesiastical seminary in St. Petersburg, he became a professor of mathematics and physics. His skills led him to become the secretary to Prince Kurakin and a competent imperial official.

Details of his marriage are sketchy, but he is believed to have married Elizabeth Jane Stephens, an Englishwoman and the daughter of Eliza Stephens, in 1798; she died the following year of tuberculosis after giving birth to a daughter. This daughter, Elizaveta Mikhailovna Speranskaya, was married to Alexander Frolov-Bagreyev, one of the first governors of the Chernigov Governorate of Ukraine in Chernihiv. Both father and daughter were named as minor characters in Tolstoy's novel War and Peace.

In January 1839, he was awarded the title of Count. His granddaughter, Mariya, was permitted by special Imperial decree to carry the title into her marriage in the princely Cantacuzène family; the title was combined with that of the Cantacuzène. Mariya was, in turn, the grandmother of famed Russian general Prince Mikhail Cantacuzène.

Speransky died in St. Petersburg on 23 February 1839. He is buried at the Tikhvinskoe (Tikhvin) Cemetery at the Alexander Nevsky Monastery; his tombstone was designed by Alexander Brullov.

== Reforms ==
In 1808, Emperor Alexander I took Speransky to the Congress of Erfurt and introduced him to Napoleon. Speransky and Napoleon discussed a possible Russian administrative reform. In his projects of reform, Speransky envisaged a constitutional system based on a series of dumas – the cantonal assembly (volost) electing the duma of the district, the dumas of the districts electing that of the province or government and these electing the Duma of the empire. As a mediating power between the autocrat and the Duma, there was to be a nominated council of state.

From this plan, the council of the empire came into existence in January 1810. The council dominated the constitutional history of Russia in the 19th century and the early years of the 20th. The Duma of the empire, created in 1905, and the institution of local self-government, (the zemstvo) created in 1864, were two of the reforms proposed by him. Speransky's plan also contributed to the constitutions granted by Alexander to Finland and Poland.

== Downfall under Alexander I ==
From 1809 to 1812, Speransky held significant power in Russia. He replaced the earlier members of the unofficial committee and became the de facto sole minister. All concerns were discussed and decided upon by Speransky and the emperor. Even the war-minister Count Arakcheyev was thrust into the background. Speransky did not use his influence for personal means; in not seeking political allies, he made himself vulnerable.

The Emperor Alexander was also an idealist, but with a more selfish attitude; he dismissed talents that overshadowed his own. He believed himself to be a potent instrument for the attainment of the ideal objective of a regenerated Russia, which was his minister's sole preoccupation.

In 1810, Speransky was still in high favor and was the confidant of the emperor in the secret diplomacy which preceded the breach of Russia with Napoleon. He is depicted at this period in Tolstoy's novel War and Peace (he can be found in the second book; third part). Speransky then committed a serious mistake – he conceived the idea of reorganizing the masonic order in Russia to educate and elevate the Orthodox clergy. The emperor agreed to the first steps being taken, namely, the suppression of existing lodges, but he was naturally suspicious of secret societies even when ostensibly admitted to their secrets. Speransky's abortive plan only resulted in adding the clergy to the number of his enemies.

On the eve of the struggle with Napoleon, Alexander made Speransky his scape-goat. Alexander appeased Old Russian sentiment, the strongest supporters of the autocratic Tsar against revolutionary France. Speransky's indiscretions gave the final impulse to his downfall. He was surrounded by spies who reported none too accurately the minister's somewhat sharp criticisms of the emperor's acts. Speransky presumed to advise Alexander not to take the chief command in the coming campaign.

A number of people in the entourage of the emperor were motivated to involve Speransky on a charge of treason, including the Grand Duchess Catherine, Fessler, Karamzin, Rostopchin, the Finnish general Count Gustaf Mauritz Armfelt and the Minister State Secretary of the Grand Duchess of Finland in St Petersburg. Alexander did not credit the charge but he made Speransky responsible for the unpopularity incurred by him in consequence of the hated reforms, and the still more hated French policy, and on the 17/29 March 1812 dismissed him from office.

From 1810 to 1812, Speransky was the Chancellor of the Imperial Academy of Turku in Finland.

== Later career under Nicholas I ==
Through the intercession of Count Alexei Arakcheyev, Speransky was appointed governor of Penza in 1816 and governor-general of Siberia in 1819. In 1821, he was returned to St Petersburg and made a member of the State Council under Alexander I of Russia.

After the Decembrist Revolt of 1825 at the beginning of the reign of Nicholas I of Russia, Speransky sat on the special court of investigation and passed the sentences.

In 1826, Speransky was appointed by Nicholas I to head the Second Section of His Imperial Majesty's Own Chancellery, a committee formed to codify Russian law. Under his leadership, the committee produced a publication of the complete collection of laws of the Russian Empire, containing 35,993 enactments. This codification called the "Full Collection of Laws" (Polnoye Sobraniye Zakonov) was presented to Nicholas I, and formed the basis for the "Collection of Laws of the Russian Empire" (Svod Zakonov Rossiskoy Imperii), the positive law valid for the Russian Empire. Speransky's liberal ideas were subsequently scrutinized and elaborated by Konstantin Kavelin and Boris Chicherin.

For his efforts in codifying Russian law, Speransky was awarded the Order of St Andrew and, in January 1839, the title of count by Tsar Nicholas I.

== Sources on Speransky's thought ==
The main sources for studying the activities of Speransky are materials and documents that belonged to him. These are acts, decrees, regulations and other official documents drawn up by him, as well as drafts, preparatory materials, letters to the emperor, family, friends. For example, correspondence with a daughter and friends helps to determine how the views of the reformer were formed, how he perceived the events, the conditions of his activities. Official correspondence reveals Speransky's attitude to state issues. Some of these documents were published—in Leningrad in 1962 was published the catalog of documents of the fund M.M. Speransky. Most of the sources were published in the Complete Collection of Laws of the Russian Empire, Collections of the Russian Historical Society, magazines, thematic publications, and in appendices to works M.A. Korfa, etc.

== Sources ==
- "СПЕРАНСКИЙ МИХАИЛ МИХАЙЛОВИЧ • Great Russian Encyclopedia – Electronic version". old.bigenc.ru. 2023.
