= State Council (Russian Empire) =

Supreme advisory body to the Russian Emperor; became upper house of parliament in 1906

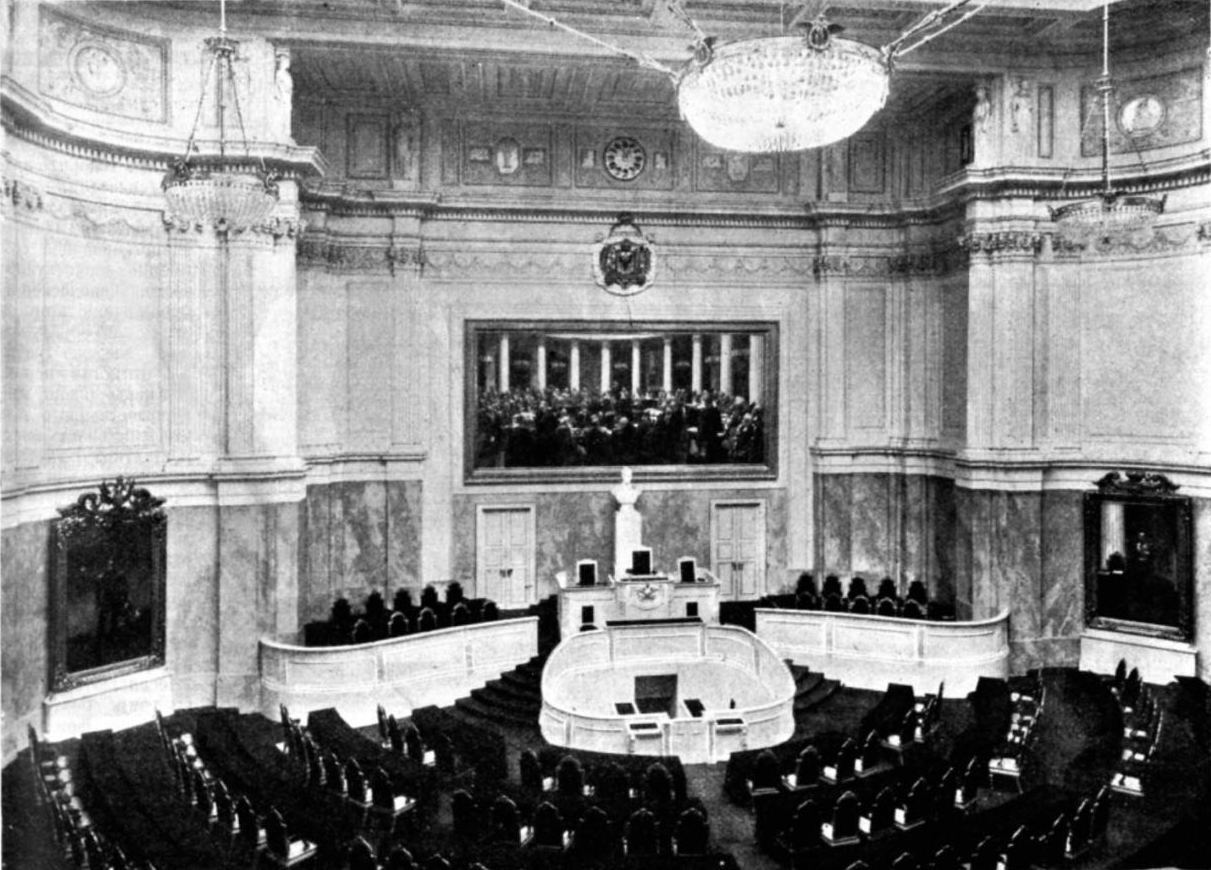
State Council hall at the Mariinsky Palace (1908).

The State Council (Russian: Госуда́рственный сове́т, romanized: Gosudarstvennyy sovet, IPA: [ɡəsʊˈdarstvʲɪn(ː)ɨj sɐˈvʲet]) was the supreme state advisory body to the tsar in the Russian Empire. From 1906, it was the upper house of the parliament under the Russian Constitution of 1906.

== 18th century ==
Early tsars' councils were small and dealt primarily with external politics.

Peter I of Russia introduced the Privy Council. Catherine I of Russia introduced the Supreme Privy Council. Its role varied during different reigns.

Peter III of Russia created the Imperial Council on 20 May 1762 ("Императорский Совет"), or, formally "The Council at the Highest Court" ("Совет при высочайшем дворе"). It was dismissed shortly after the succession of Catherine II of Russia.

== 1810–1906 ==
The State Council was established by Alexander I of Russia in 1810 as part of Speransky's reforms. Although envisaged by Speransky as the upper chamber of the Russian parliament, it was actually an advisory legislative body composed of people whom the tsar could trust. The number of members varied at different periods. Upon its establishment in 1810 there were 35 members; in 1890 there were 60. The main duty of the council was the preliminary investigation, promulgation and abrogation of laws.

There were four departments of the council: Legislative; Civil and Ecclesiastical Administration; State Economy; and Industry, Science and Commerce. Each department had its own presiding officer (State Secretary) and met separately to discuss matters assigned to their departments. There were also plenary sessions of the whole council presided over by the Chairman of the State Council.

The council as a whole examined projects of law proposed by the ministers who were ex-officio members. The majority of their sessions concerned the budget and state expenditures but they would examine anything submitted to them. They had no authority to propose changes to the law, to examine anything that was not submitted to them for examination or decision-making authority. The council only made recommendations to the monarch, who could support the majority, a minority, or disregard the council's recommendations altogether, as he saw fit. According to Dominic Lieven it "played no part in the formulation of foreign policy and its members' access to the emperor was very limited.

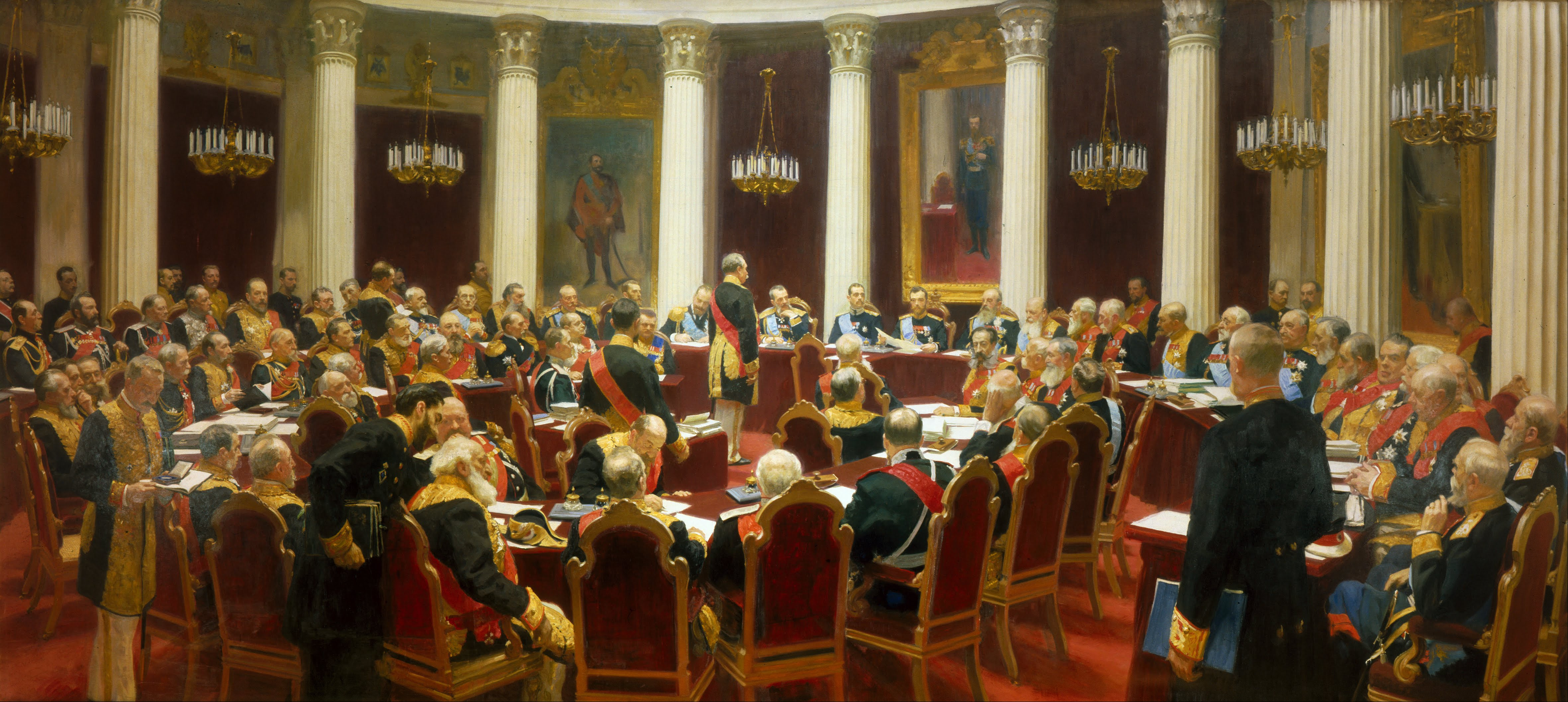
The centenary session of the State Council in the Mariinsky Palace on 7 May 1901, is represented on Ilya Repin's huge canvas Ceremonial Sitting of the State Council on 7 May 1901 (detail shown), now exhibited in the Russian Museum.

== 1906–1917 ==
During 1906–1917, the status of the State Council was defined by the Russian Constitution of 1906. Its chairman was appointed by the Tsar. Half of its members were appointed by the Tsar from persons distinguished at civil and military service, and half by elections from various categories of society, separately:

- 56 seats from Zemstvo (1 from each guberniya),
- 18 seats from Assemblies of Nobility,
- 6 seats from the Russian Orthodox Church: 3 of them from white clergy, and 3 from black clergy,
- 12 seats from stock exchange committees, chambers of commerce and business associations,
- 6 seats from the Russian Academy of Sciences,
- 2 seats from the Diet of Finland, which refused to send delegates.

The State Council was the upper house of the parliament, while the State Duma of the Russian Empire was the lower house. Compared to the contemporary British House of Lords and Prussian Herrenhaus, the Russian upper chamber was more democratically constituted, as half of its members were democratically elected from different sections of society, while the Herrenhaus consisted of hereditary peers, and the House of Lords consisted of hereditary peers and clergy from privileged dioceses.

The State Council ceased to exist after the February Revolution of 1917. The Soviet Union did not replace this council until 1991 when the State Council of the Soviet Union was created amid its imminent breakup. The latter council would be short-lived and dissolved by year end.

== See also ==
- List of Chairmen of the State Council of Imperial Russia
- State Council of the Soviet Union
- State Council (Russia)

== Sources ==
- Out of My Past: Memoirs of Count Kokovtsov. Hoover War Library Publications. Vol. 6. Stanford University Press. 1935. OCLC 122332881.
- Lieven, Dominic (1984). "The Russian ruling elite under Nicholas II [Career patterns]". Cahiers du monde russe et soviétique. 25 (4): 429–454. doi:10.3406/cmr.1984.2022.

Political offices
Preceded by Supreme Privy Council	State Council (Russian Empire); 1810–1917	Succeeded by State Council of the Soviet Union 1991
