= List of national education ministers of Russia =

This is a list of the ministers of national enlightenment of the Russian Empire, also translated as ministers of national education. The minister was at the head of the Ministry of National Education (also translated as the Ministry of National Enlightenment).

From 24 October 1817 to 15 May 1824, the ministry was part of the Ministry of Religious Affairs and Public Education, also translated as Ministry of Spiritual Affairs and National Enlightenment.

== List of ministers ==
- Count Pyotr Zavadobskiy, 8 September 1802 – 11 April 1810
- Count Aleksey Razumovskiy, 11 April 1810 – 10 August 1816
- Prince Aleksandr Golitsin, 10 August 1816 – 15 May 1824
- Aleksandr Shishkov, 15 May 1824 – 25 April 1828
- Prince Carl Christoph von Lieven, 25 April 1828 – 18 March 1833
- Count Sergey Uvarov, 21 March 1833 – 20 October 1849
- Prince Platon Shirinsky-Shikhmatov, 20 October 1849 – 7 April 1853
- Avraam Norov, 7 April 1853 – 23 March 1858
- Evgraf Kovalevskiy, 23 March 1858 – 28 June 1861
- Count Yevfimiy Putyatin, 28 June 1861 – 25 December 1861
- Alexandr Golovnin, 25 December 1861 – 14 April 1866
- Count Dmitry Tolstoy, 14 April 1866 – 24 April 1880
- Andrey Saburov, 24 April 1880 – 24 March 1881
- Baron Aleksandr Nicolai, 24 March 1881 – 16 March 1882
- Count Ivan Delyanov, 16 March 1882 – 29 December 1897
- Nikolay Bogolepov, 12 February 1898 – 2 March 1901
- Pyotr Vannovsky, 24 March 1901 – 11 April 1902
- Grigoriy Zenger, 11 April 1902 – 23 January 1904
- Vladimir Glazov, 10 April 1904 – 18 October 1905
- Count Ivan Ivanovich Tolstoy, 31 October 1905 – 24 April 1906
- Pyotr Kaufman, 24 April 1906 – 1 January 1908
- Aleksand Shvarts, 1 January 1908 – 25 September 1910
- Lev Kasso, 25 September 1910 – 26 November 1914
- Count Pavel Ignatieff, 9 January 1915 – 27 December 1916
- Nikolai Kulchitsky, 27 December 1916 – 28 February 1917

== See also ==
- Ministry of National Education (Russian Empire)
- Russian Council of Ministers
- Russian Provisional Government
