= Ivan Zabelin =

Russian historian and archaeologist

- Portrait by Ilya Repin, 1877
- Born: 29 September 1820; Tver, Russian Empire
- Died: 13 January 1909 (aged 88); Moscow, Russian Empire
- Scientific career
- Institutions: Kremlin Armoury; State Historical Museum

Ivan Yegorovich Zabelin (Иван Егорович Забелин; 29 September 1820 – 13 January 1909) was a Russian historian and archaeologist with a Slavophile bent who helped establish the National History Museum on Red Square and presided over this institution until 1906. He was the foremost authority on the history of the city of Moscow and a key figure in the 19th-century Russian Romantic Nationalism.

== Biography ==
Zabelin joined the Moscow Kremlin staff in 1837. Influenced by the early Muscovite "antiquaries" such as Ivan Snegirev and Pavel Stroyev, Zabelin was one of the first to investigate the history of Moscow's suburbs and monasteries. While working in the Armoury, Zabelin studied the history of metalworking and enamel work in medieval Russia. He was also considered an expert on icon-painting and Muscovite architecture.

In 1859 Count Sergei Stroganov invited Zabelin to excavate the Scythian tumulus graves in South Russia and the Crimea. He is credited with introducing stratigraphic methods in Russian field archaeology. It was he who excavated the Chertomlyk grave, one of the largest Scythian kurgans. His findings are now part of the Hermitage Museum collection. Zabelin joined forces with Count Aleksey Uvarov in establishing the Russian Archaeological Society (in 1846). He summed up his findings in The Antiquities of Herodotus's Scythia (1866, 1873).

In 1873 Zabelin quit archaeological pursuites and devoted himself to the study of Pre-Petrine, late medieval Muscovy. He headed the Moscow Society of History and Archaeology between 1872 and 1888 and was revered by the Romantic Nationalist artists such as Andrei Ryabushkin, Sergei Milyutin, and Viktor Vasnetsov. In 1894 Zabelin was elected into the Petersburg Academy of Sciences (honoris causa).

Zabelin believed that the "soul of the people" manifests itself not so much in the state institutions and political history (as his German colleagues held) but in the quotidian particulars of domestic life and family relations. He elaborated his views in the series of monographs detailing the "private life of Russian people" in the 16th and 17th centuries.

Zabelin's great trilogy "The Domestic Life of the Russian Tsars" (1862), "The Domestic Life of Russian Tsarinas" (1872) and "Great Boyars in Their Votchinas" (1871) is still consulted and quoted by modern historians. His magnum opus The History of the Russian Mode of Life from the Earliest Times was left unfinished.
