= Praskovya Uvarova =

Russian archaeologist

Praskovya Sergeevna Uvarova
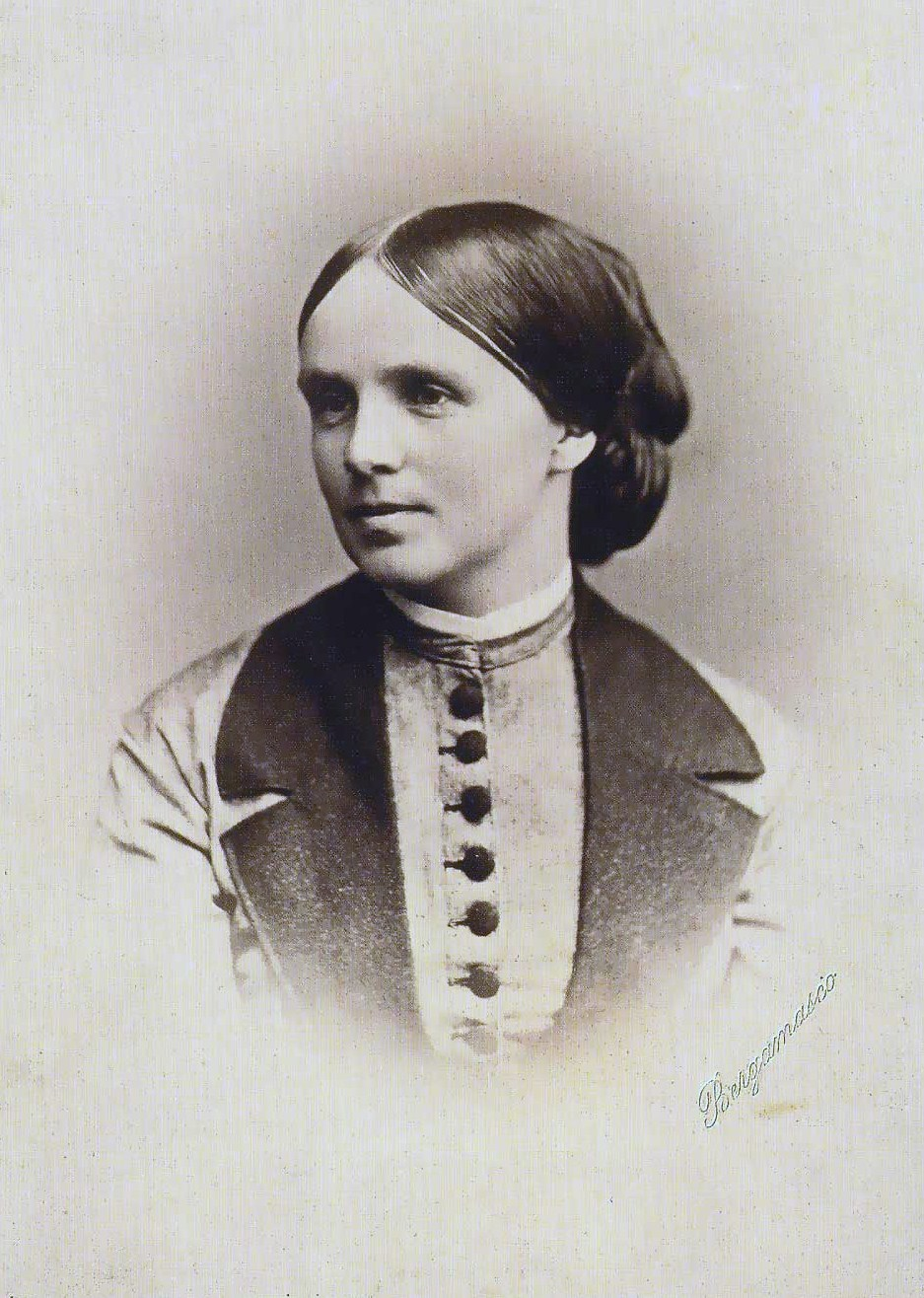
- Born: 9 April 1840; Bobrik, Kharkov Governorate, Russian Empire
- Died: 30 June 1924 (aged 84); Dobrna, Yugoslavia
- Occupation: Archaeologist
- Spouse: Aleksey Uvarov (1818–1885)
- Parents: Sergey Alexandrovich Scherbatov (1800–1864) (father); Praskovya Borisovna Svyatopolk-Chetvertinskaya (1818–1899) (mother)

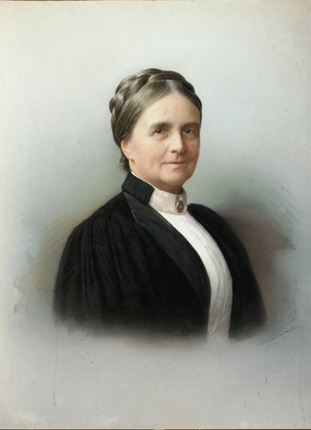
Praskowja Uvarowa around 1905

Countess Praskovya Sergeevna Uvarova (Russian: Праско́вья Серге́евна Ува́рова), née Princess Scherbatova (Russian: Щерба́това); 9 April 1840, Bobriki, Kharkov Governorate – 30 June 1924, Dobrna, Slovenia) was a Russian archaeologist. In 1885 she became chairman of the Moscow Archaeological Society and held that post until 1917.

== Life ==
Uvarova was born as the daughter of Sergey Alexandrovich Scherbatov and his wife, Princess Praskovya Borisovna Svyatopolk-Chetvertinskaya. In the course of her education, she mastered French, German and English.

In 1859, at age 18, she married Count Aleksey Sergeyevich Uvarov, member of the Uvarov family, founder and chairman of the Archaeological Society of Moscow and the historical museum. Soon after the wedding, the couple traveled to Rome, Naples and Florence where Uvarova introduced her husband to the splendors of Europe.

When her husband died in 1885, she succeeded him as chairman of the Archaeological Society and presided over ten archaeological congresses for all of Russia. In 1895 Uvarova was elected an honorary member of the St. Petersburg Academy of Sciences, becoming the first Russian woman to do so. (A Russian-born Swede Sofya Kovalevskaya was already a corresponding member of the academy.)

Uvarova conducted large expeditions with a focus on the Caucasus, according to Khrushkova,

She explored the areas of the Caucasus foothills away from the coast. In her own words, she had "very often to get to the sites via completely overgrown, little known and inaccessible trails," "riding around those upland spaces or deaf gorges which lie beyond roads and communications, and which, with rare exceptions, can only be reached on horseback" (Уварова 1894, 2). In the area of the Tsebelda valley, Uvarova found a group of small medieval churches, often decorated with sculptures. Some of the monuments that she published remain poorly understood.

As a result of her work, several volumes of Ancient Caucasus were published on her initiative, several of them with her own contributions, among them (Materialy po archeologii Kavkaza). In 1916, she was celebrated by 30 of the most distinguished archaeologists of contemporary Russia.

As a result of the Russian Revolution of 1917, the title of "Countess" had become a stigma and her collections and property were confiscated. She emigrated to Yugoslavia, where she lived modestly.

Uvarova died at 84 on 30 June 1924 in Dobrna, Kingdom of Yugoslavia.

== Family ==
Uvarova and her husband had seven children.

- Alexei (Алексей) (1859-1913)
- Praskovja (Прасковья) (1860–1934)
- Sergei (Сергей) (1862–1888)
- Ekaterina (Екатерина) (died in infancy, 1863)
- Ekaterina (1864–1953)
- Fyodor (Фёдор) (1866–1954)
- Igor (Игорь) (1869–1934)

== Memberships ==
- Honorary Member of the St Petersburg Academy of Sciences
- Honorary Member of the Russian Academy of Sciences
