= Archaeographic Commission =

Russian historical and ethnographic institution (1834–1936)

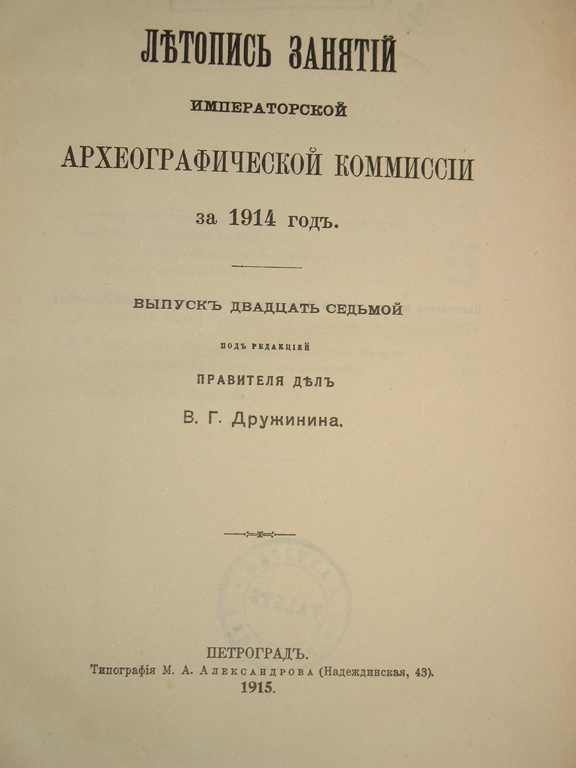
The Proceedings of the Russian Archival Commission from 1914

The Archaeographic Commission (Russian: Археографическая комиссия) was set up in St. Petersburg in 1834 by Platon Shirinsky-Shikhmatov, Nikolay Ustryalov, and Pavel Stroyev with the aim of publishing historical and ethnographic materials assembled by Stroyev and others in the provinces of Imperial Russia.

The commission was affiliated with the Ministry of National Education and was modeled on an earlier commission based in Moscow. Its first major enterprise was the Complete Collection of Russian Chronicles, published from 1841 onward. Regional archaeographical commissions were established in Kiev (see Kyiv Archeographic Commission), Vilna, and Tiflis. The commission spearheaded efforts to obtain foreign sources on Russian history and sent its emissaries in search of Russia-related documents to the major archives of Europe.

After Shirinsky-Shikhmatov the commission's presidents included Avraam Norov (1850–69), Vladimir Titov (1871–91), Sergei Platonov (1918–29), Nikolay Likhachov (1929), and Mikhail Pokrovsky (1930–32).

In the 20th century the institution went through several reorganizations and name changes. After the establishment of the Academy of Sciences of the Soviet Union (1925), the commission came under its jurisdiction. The Historical-Archaeographic Institute, founded in 1931, was liquidated in 1936 and transformed into the Saint Petersburg Institute of History (SPbIH).

In the 21st century, the SPbIH archive contains documents collected by the previous Archaeographic Commission. The modern Archaeographic Commission was founded in 1956 by Mikhail Tikhomirov as a branch of the Academy's history department.

== See also ==
- Acts of the Vilnius Archaeographic Commission
- Acts of the Lithuanian-Ruthenian State, collection of 14th- to 16th-century documents on socio-economic history of the Grand Duchy of Lithuania (including Belarus and until 1569 Ukraine)
- Kyiv Archeographic Commission in Kyiv (1843–1936), predecessor of the Institute of History of Ukraine
