= Acts of the Lithuanian–Ruthenian State =

19th-century collection of historical documents

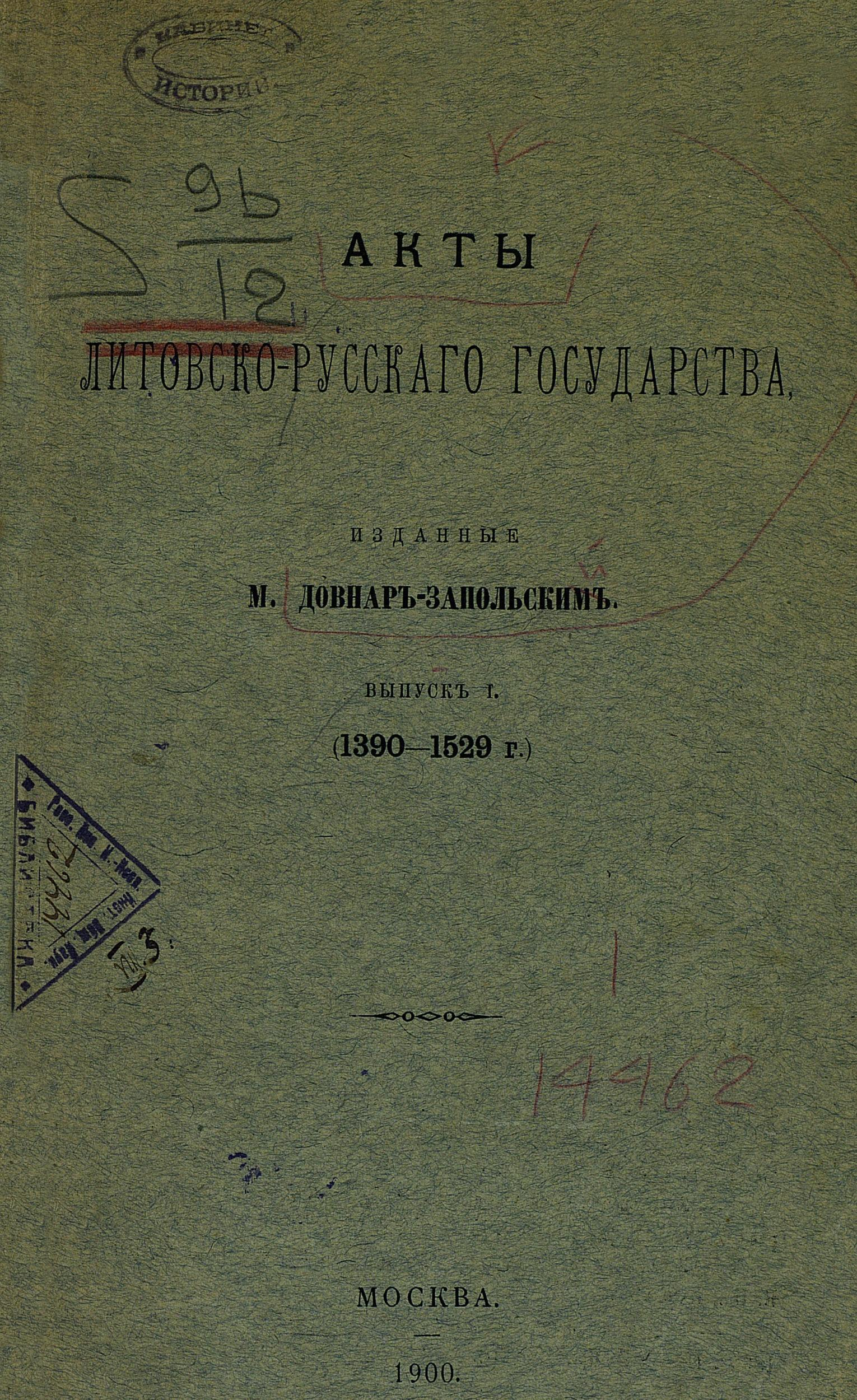
- 1900 edition
- Editor: Mitrofan Dovnar-Zapolsky
- Original title: Russian: Акты Литовско-Русского государства
- Language: Old Belarusian, Latin, Russian
- Genre: Historical documents, archaeography
- Publication date: 1897–1899
- Publication place: Russian Empire
- Media type: Print

The Grand Duchy of Lithuania in 1430

The Acts of the Lithuanian–Ruthenian State or Acts of the Lithuanian–Russian State (Russian: Акты Литовско-Русского государства, romanized: Akty Litovsko-Russkogo gosudarstva; Belarusian: Акты Літоўска-Рускай дзяржавы, romanized: Akty Litoŭska-Ruskaj dziaržavy) is a collection of historical documents regarding the socio-economic history of the Grand Duchy of Lithuania from the 14th to the 16th centuries. Compiled and edited by the Belarusian historian Mitrofan Dovnar-Zapolsky, the collection was published in Moscow by the University Press. The edition consists of Volume 1 (labeled "Issue 1", published in 1899) and Volume 2 (published earlier, in 1897).

== Content ==
The collection contains documents in the Ruthenian language (Old Belarusian) and Latin languages, sourced from the Lithuanian Metrica.

The published materials include:

- Privileges granting Magdeburg rights to cities;
- Grand ducal charters regarding land ownership;
- Inventories of estates;
- Materials from general Sejms (parliaments): Vilnius (1563 and 1565), Grodno (1567 and 1568), and the Lublin Sejm (1569);
- Descriptions of the borders of the Grand Duchy of Lithuania with the Grand Duchy of Moscow (1523);
- A census of cities in Lithuania indicating the number of soldiers sent by them for war (c. 1513);
- Contracts for the lease of Grand Ducal customs houses and taverns;
- Income and expenditure books of grand ducal scribes;
- Regulations (charters) for peasants in state holdings.

== See also ==
- Acts of the Vilnius Archaeographic Commission
- Archive of South-West Russia
- Kyiv Archeographic Commission in Kyiv (1843–1936), predecessor of the Institute of History of Ukraine
- Archaeographic Commission in Saint Petersburg (1834–1936), predecessor of the Saint Petersburg Institute of History

== Bibliography ==
- Голубеў, В. Ф. (1996). "Акты Літоўска-Рускай дзяржавы". Беларуская энцыклапедыя: У 18 т. [Belarusian Encyclopedia: In 18 Vol.] (in Belarusian). Vol. 1. Minsk: БелЭн. p. 210. ISBN 985-11-0036-6.
- Matyash, Iryna Borysivna (2008). "Довнар-Запольський Митрофан Вікторович" [Mytrofan Viktorovych Dovnar-Zapolsky]. Encyclopedia of Modern Ukraine (in Ukrainian). Vol. 8. Kyiv: NASU Institute of Encyclopaedic Research. Archived from the original on 13 February 2026.
- Borschak, Elie; Ohloblyn, Oleksander; Subtelny, Orest (1984). "Archeography". Internet Encyclopedia of Ukraine. Vol. 1. Toronto: Canadian Institute of Ukrainian Studies. Archived from the original on 13 February 2026.
