= Nikolay Likhachyov =

Russian sigillographer (1862–1936)

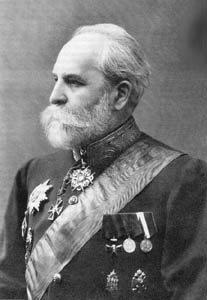

Nikolay Petrovich Likhachyov (Russian: Никола́й Петро́вич Лихачёв), alternatively transliterated as Likhachev (12 April 1862 – 14 April 1936) was the first and foremost Russian sigillographer (that is, an expert on seals) who also contributed significantly to an array of auxiliary historical disciplines, including palaeography, epigraphy, diplomatics, genealogy, and numismatics. He was elected a member of the Academy of Sciences of the USSR in 1925 and was put in charge of the Archaeographic Commission in 1929.

== Scholarly career ==
A scion of an old noble family, Likhachev was born in Chistopol, a town in the Kazan Governorate. Among his paternal uncles, Ivan Likhachyov was an admiral and Andrey Likhachyov was an avid antiquarian whose collections formed the core of the Kazan City Museum.

Nikolay Likhachyov graduated from the Kazan University in 1884 and joined the staff of the Saint Petersburg Archaeological Institute in 1892. His early work shed light on the hierarchy of 16th-century Muscovite clerks, or diaks. His doctor's dissertation was on the subject of Muscovite pulp manufacture and paper mills.

In 1902-14 Likhachyov filled the office of assistant director of the Imperial Public Library in St. Petersburg. During these years he brought to light a wealth of medieval papers, as well as many valuable materials concerning coins, watermarks, and hierarchy of medieval Russia. Together with Prince Aleksey Lobanov-Rostovsky he founded (in 1897) the Russian Genealogical Society.

He developed an early interest in medieval icon painting and produced several pioneering studies on the subject, including Materials for a History of Russian Icon Painting (1906, vol. 1-2), Andrei Rublev's Style of Painting (1907), and Historical Meaning of Italo-Greek Icon Painting (1911). The latter was awarded a Gold Uvarov Prize by the Academy of Sciences.

He died at Leningrad in 1936.

== Likhachyov collections ==
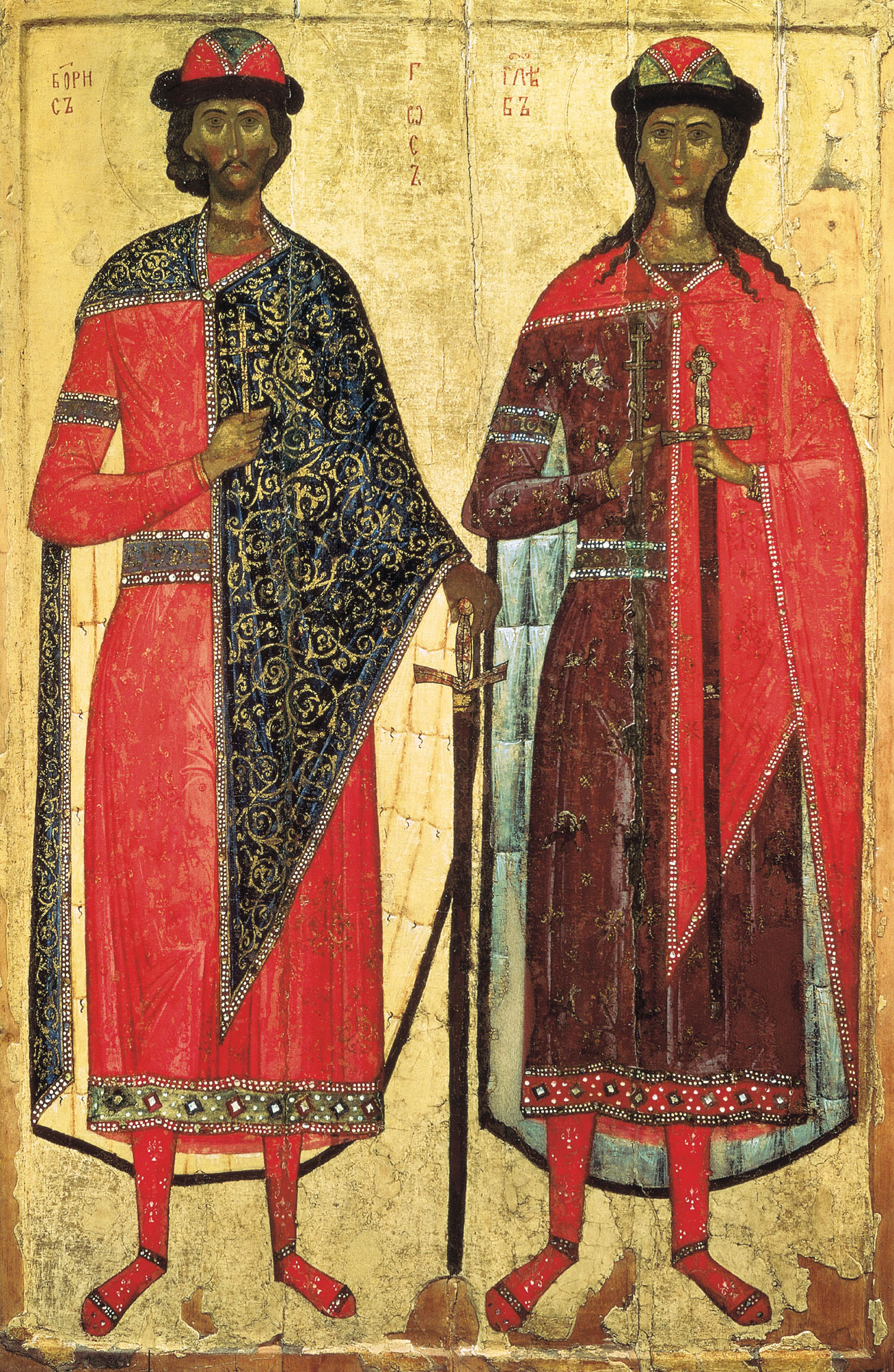
Likhachyov's collection included the oldest icon of Sts. Boris and Gleb

Likachyov's political views were decidedly nationalistic. In 1911 he joined Aleksey Suvorin and Nikodim Kondakov in founding the Russian Assembly, the country's first monarchist party which later became associated with the Black Hundreds.

Likhachyov's proximity to the right wing of the tsarist government, as well as his own considerable fortune and unfailing taste, helped him to amass one of the largest collections of antiquities in the Russian Empire. It encompassed 15,000 old coins and 1,500 icons, as wells as some 80,000 books, including a selection of manuscripts and incunabulae. His collection of Byzantine and early Russian seals was by far the largest in the world.

The fate of Likhachyov's collections was variable. In 1913, Nicholas II bought his holdings of icons on behalf of the Alexander III Museum. In an attempt to save the remaining collections from dispersal in the days of the Russian Revolution, Likhachev conveyed them to the Academy of Sciences, which allowed them to be set up as the Palaeography Museum, of which Likhachev served as director in 1925–1930. His own mansion was given over to the Archaeographic Commission and currently houses its successor, the Saint Petersburg Institute of History.

It was in 1930 that Likhachyov, Sergey Platonov, Yevgeny Tarle and several other prominent historians were arrested in connection with the Industrial Party Trial. Likhachev was thrown out of the academy and exiled to Astrakhan, while his remaining personal collections were nationalized. The Likhachev collection of cuneiform tablets from Ur and Lagash, for instance, is currently divided between the Pushkin Museum and the Hermitage Museum.
