= Kyiv Archeographic Commission =

Archival institution in Imperial Kyiv

Monuments published by the Kyiv Commission for the Analysis of Ancient Acts, 2nd edition, supplement 2, 1897.

The Kyiv Archeographic Commission (Note: Ukrainian: Київська археографічна комісія, romanized: Kyivsjka arkheohrafichna komisija. Russian: Киевская археографическая комиссия, romanized: Kievskaya arkheograficheskaya komissiya.) was a scientific institution in imperial Kyiv, established on 31 May 1843 to examine historical documents kept by the Kiev Governorate, the Volhynia Governorate, and the Podolia Governorate.

== Description ==
=== Origins ===
The Commission was founded on the initiative of Mykhailo Maksymovych, a Ukrainian historian, writer and professor of plant biology, with the "Most High Permission" of Emperor Nicholas I of Russia. The Temporary Committee for the Study of Antiquities (Ukrainian: Тимчасовий комітет для дослідження старожитностей), which had already been founded in the city in October 1835, was merged into the Kyiv Archeographic Commission in 1845. The name "Kyiv Archeographic Commission" is a historiographic shorthand to distinguish it from the Archaeographic Commission in Saint Petersburg (1834–1936), upon which it was modelled. Historically, it had a wide range of long, official names. Until 1914, it operated under the formal full name of the "Temporary Commission for the Analysis of Ancient Acts, Most High Established under the Kiev Military, Podolsk and Volyn Governor-General", usually shortened to just "Temporary Commission" (Ukrainian: Тимчасова комісія, romanized: Tymchasova komisija).

=== Research and ideology ===
The Commission conducted research in the archives of state institutions, magistrates and monasteries, in private archives in the governorates of Kiev (Kyiv), Volhynia (Volyn) and Podolia (Podillia), and, when necessary, in Moscow, St. Petersburg, Warsaw and other cities. Based on the materials and documents it collected, the Central State Historical Archives of Ukraine in Kyiv was created in 1852. While one of the goals of the Commission was to further Imperial Russian ideological claims, such as that Right-Bank Ukraine had "always been Russian", and not Polish, the Commission unintentionally stimulated the development of a Ukrainian national identity. Taras Shevchenko, Mykola Kostomarov, and Panteleimon Kulish all worked at the Commission before they were arrested and exiled in 1847 due to their simultaneous activities at the Brotherhood of Saints Cyril and Methodius, one of the landmark organisations driving the Ukrainian national revival. The history professor Volodymyr Antonovych, who later headed the Commission, was loyal to the Russian Empire, but also advocated for a historical process separate from the Russian one, and a continuous thousand-year Ukrainian history.

=== Renamings and mergers ===
After the governorates were abolished in 1914, the Temporary Commission for the Analysis of Ancient Acts was subordinated to the Ministry of Internal Affairs. However, due to the First World War, its publishing activities were practically paralysed. In November 1917, director V. Ikonnykov appealed to Volodymyr Vernadsky (head Commission for Educational Institutions and Institutions under the Ministry of National Education) to be subordinated and reorganised under this ministry. To this effect, a draft "Regulations on the Kyiv Archeographic Commission" was developed, which formally renamed the Temporary Commission to "Kyiv Archeographic Commission" (KAK).

The Kyiv Provincial Scientific Archival Commission (Ukrainian: Київська губернська вчена архівна комісія), founded on 28 March 1914, was merged into the Kyiv Archeographic Commission in 1918. On 29 November 1918, a jubilee meeting of the Commission was held to mark the 75th anniversary of its founding, at which elections were held (these were the last elections in the history of the Commission) for its full members. After the All-Ukrainian Academy of Sciences (VUAN) was founded in 1921, with its own Archeographic Commission, the KAK and the VUAN commission were merged at a joint meeting in April 1921 under the name of "Archeographic Commission of the All-Ukrainian Academy of Sciences". In 1936, this Commission was reorganised as the Department of Archeography of the newly created Institute of History of Ukraine.

== See also ==
Ukrainian Wikiquote has quotations related to: Київська археографічна комісія

- Acts of the Lithuanian-Ruthenian State, collection of 14th- to 16th-century documents on socio-economic history of the Grand Duchy of Lithuania (including Belarus and until 1569 Ukraine)
- Archaeographic Commission in Saint Petersburg (1834–1936), predecessor of the Saint Petersburg Institute of History
- Institute of History of Ukraine, since 1936 the successor to the Kyiv Archeographic Commission
- History of Kyiv (1811–1917)

== Sources ==
- Mola, Kateryna (3 April 2024). ""Вони довели існування України". Ігор Гирич про інтелектуалів ХІХ століття" ["They proved the existence of Ukraine". Ihor Hyrych about intellectuals of the 19th century]. localhistory.org.ua (in Ukrainian).
- Yasj, Oleksiy Vasilyovych (2007). "Київська археографічна комісія" [Kyiv Archeographic Commission]. Encyclopedia of History of Ukraine (in Ukrainian). Vol. 4. Kyiv: Institute of History of Ukraine. p. 528. Archived from the original on 13 February 2026.
