= Uvarov =

Russian noble family

The Uvarov family Ува́ровы
- Russian noble family
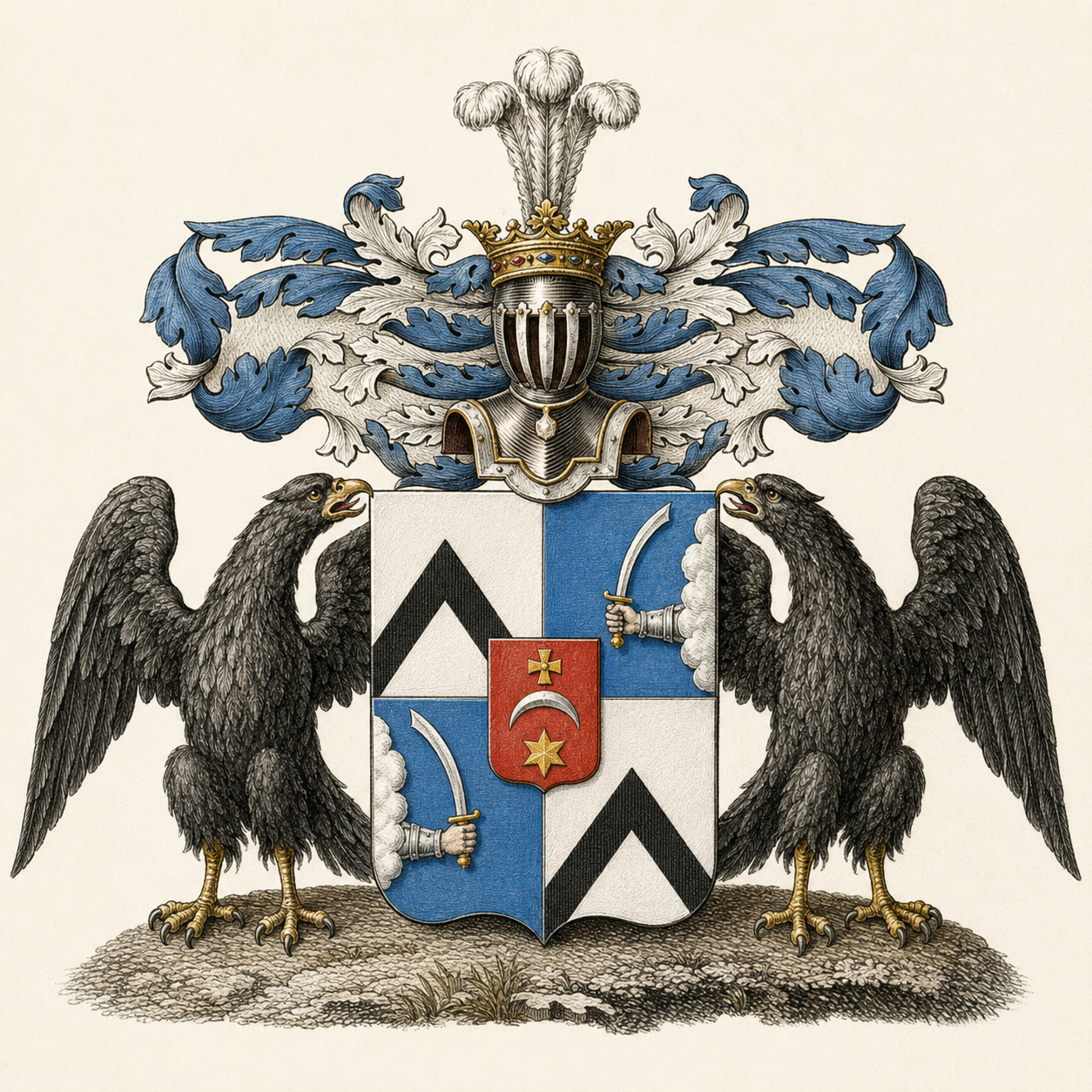
- Coat of arms of the Uvarov family
- Country: Grand Duchy of Moscow, Russian Empire
- Origin: Grand Principality of Moscow
- Founded: 14th century
- Founder: Minchak Uvarov
- Titles: Count, Baron, Boyar, Nobility
- Connected families: Davydov, Zlobin
- Coat of arms of the Uvarov family is presented on page 33 of the 5th volume of the General Armorial of the Noble Families of the Russian Empire. Governorates that had the Uvarov family listed in their noble lineage books: Saint Petersburg, Moscow, Tula, Simbirsk, Kharkov, Tver. The Uvarov family is included in the Velvet Book, Volume 2, pages 392 and 421

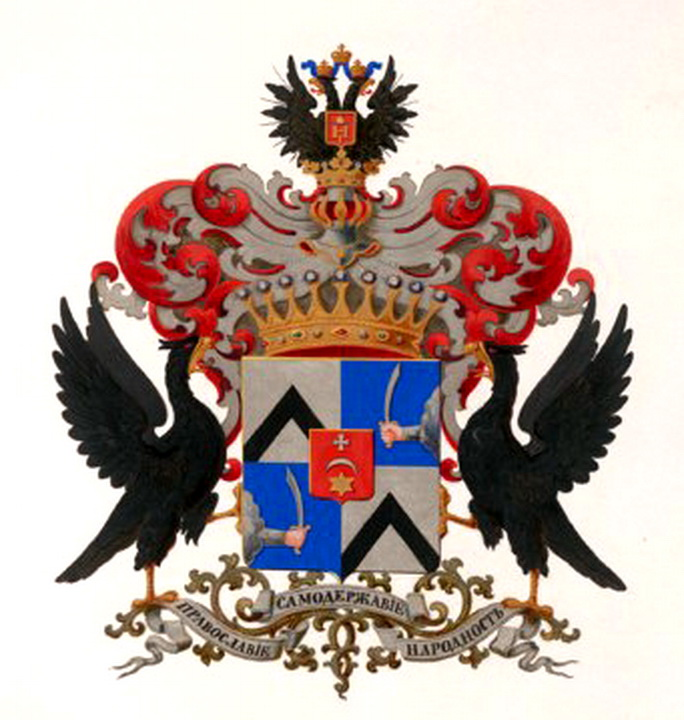
Coat of arms of the Counts Uvarov

The Uvarov family is a former Russian noble family of counts and nobility of the Russian Empire.

== Origin ==
The family descends from Mirza Minchak Kasayevich, baptised Simeon, who left the Great Horde for Grand Duke Vasily Dmitrievich. He had children named Davyd, Zloba, Orkan, later renamed Orinka, and Uvar. They were the forefathers of the Davydov-Minchaks, the Zlobins, the Orinkins, and the Uvarovs.

== Counts Uvarov ==
Comital title was granted to one branch of the family on 1 July 1846 by a personal decree of Emperor Nicholas I of Russia. The Minister of Public Education (1833–1848), Active Privy Councillor Sergey Semyonovich Uvarov, in recognition of his work and merits, was elevated with his descendants to the rank of count of the Russian Empire, for which a charter was granted (29 December 1850).

=== Notable representatives of the count family ===
- Fyodor Semyonovich Uvarov (1786-1845) — major general, participant in the Patriotic War of 1812.
- Alexey Sergeyevich Uvarov (1828-1884) — Russian archaeologist, count.
- Praskovya Sergeyevna Uvarova (1840-1924) — Russian scientist, historian, archaeologist. Wife of archaeologist Alexey Uvarov.
- Alexey Alekseyevich Uvarov (1859-1913) — public figure and politician, member of the III State Duma from the Saratov Governorate.

== Historical records ==
On 12 October 1686 documentation for the inclusion of the Uvarov family in the Velvet Book was submitted. It included a genealogical numbering system (ahnentafel) of the Uvarovs and the deed of obedience from 1612, given to the strelets sotnyk (firearm troops centurion) Yermolay Vladimirovich Uvarov for the village of Serkovskoye in the Podgorodsky stan of the Aleksinsky district.

== Description of coats of arms ==
=== Coat of Arms. Part V. No. 33. ===
Coat of arms of the Uvarov family, descendants of Minchak Kasayevich: in the middle of the escutcheon, divided into four parts, there is a smaller red shield, in which a golden cross pattée is depicted, and under it a silver moon with horns turned down towards a golden hexagonal star (inspired by the Polish coat of arms of Murdelio). In the first and the fourth field there is a black rafter against a silver background. In the second and the third field the background is blue and a charge in the form of an armoured hand holding a sword emerging from a cloud is depicted (inspired by the Polish coat of arms of Malaya Pogonia). The shield is surmounted by a noble helm and a coronet with three ostrich feathers. The mantling of the shield is blue, lined with silver. Shield supporters are two black single-headed eagles.

=== Coat of Arms. Part XI. No. 16. ===
Coat of arms of the Counts Uvarovs: the escutcheon is divided into four parts. In the middle of it there is a smaller shield. In the first and fourth field, against a silver background, there is a black rafter. In the second and third field, against a blue background, there is a hand in silver armour emerging from silver clouds holding a silver curved sword with a gold hilt. In the smaller shield, against a red background, there is a silver crescent with horns pointing downwards, under it a golden six-pointed star, above it a silver cross pattée. Above the shield is the count's coronet and the count's crowned helm. The crest depicts a soaring black imperial eagle, on its chest is a red shield with a golden border and the monogram of Emperor Nicholas I. The mantling is red and silver. Shield supporters are two black eagles with red eyes, red tongues, and golden beaks and paws. Motto: “Orthodoxy, Autocracy, Nationality” (Russian: Православіе, Самодержавіе, Народность) in black letters on a silver ribbon.

== Notable people ==
- Aleksandr Uvarov (ice hockey) (1922–1994), Soviet ice hockey player
- Aleksandr Uvarov (footballer) (b. 1960), Soviet and Israeli footballer
- Aleksey Uvarov (Count Aleksey Sergeyevich Uvarov) (1825–1884), Russian archaeologist
- Boris Uvarov (1889–1970), Russian-British entomologist
- Olga Uvarov (Dame Olga Nikolaevna Uvarov) (1910–2001), the first woman president of the Royal College of Veterinary Surgeons
- Sergey Uvarov (Count Sergey Semionovich Uvarov) (1786–1855), Russian classical scholar and statesman
- V. Uvarov, Soviet set decorator
