= Sontsov =

Sontsov, feminine: Sontsova (Russian: Сонцов, Сонцова) is the surname of the Russian noble family of Sontsovs. The family of Sontsovs is a 17th-century spin-off of the family of Sontsov-Sasekin.

Among the property of the Sontsovs was Sontsovka, the birthplace of Russian composer Sergei Prokofiev. It was founded in the 18th century by the former governor of Poltava Governorate, Alexander Sontsov, and owned by Dmitri Dmitrievich Sontsov during Prokofiev's childhood.

The surname may refer to:

- Dmitri Dmitrievich Sontsov), Russian horse-breeder, horse-breeding book author
- Dmitry Sontsov, Russian numismatist
- Alexander Borisovich Sontsov (1750—1811), Russian statesman, governor of Voronezh Governorate (1797–1800, 1805–1811) and Poltava Governorate
- Pyotr Alexandrovich Sontsov (1785—1850), Russian statesman, governor of Voronezh Governorate (1820–1824) and Oryol Governorate (1824-1830)
