= Sergey Uvarov =

Russian statesman (1786–1855)

Count Sergey Uvarov
- Сергей Уваров
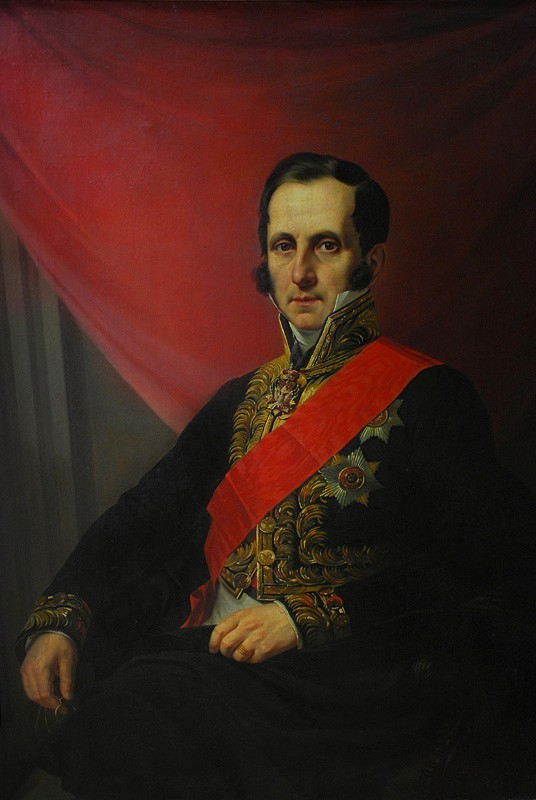
- Uvarov's portrait by Jan Ksawery Kaniewski, 1844
- Born: August 25, 1786; Saint Petersburg, Russian Empire
- Died: October 4, 1855 (aged 69); Moscow, Russian Empire

President of the Russian Academy of Sciences
- In office 1818–posthumously
- Monarchs: Alexander; Nicholas; Alexander II
- Preceded by: post vacant
- Succeeded by: Dmitry Bludov

Minister of National Education
- In office 1833–1849
- Monarch: Nicholas
- Preceded by: Karl Lieven
- Succeeded by: Platon Shirinsky-Shikhmatov

Signature
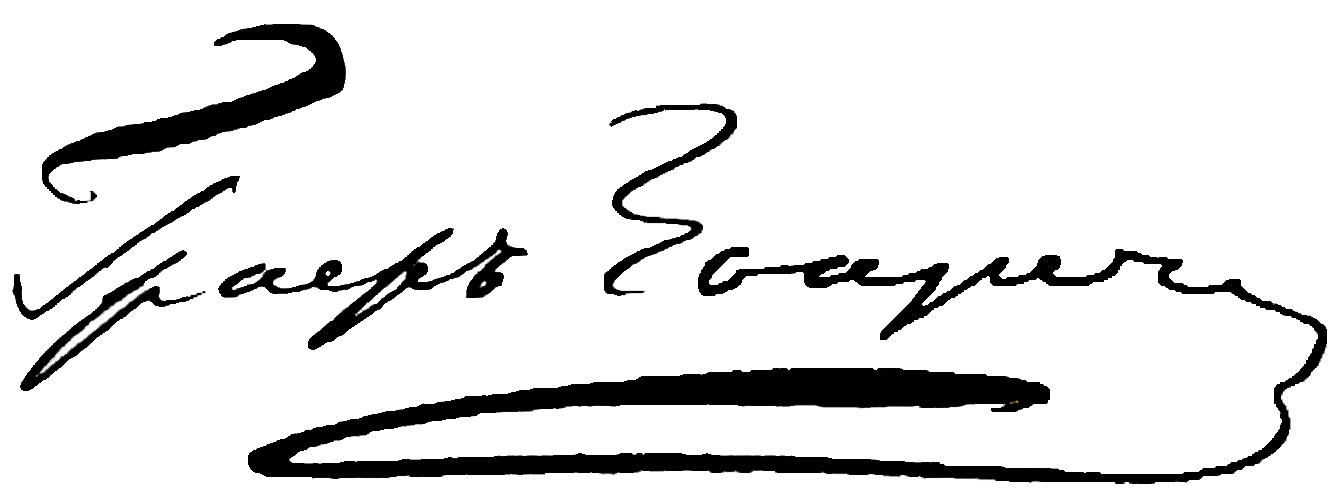

Count Sergey Semionovich Uvarov (Russian: Серге́й Семёнович Ува́ров; 5 September [O.S. 25 August] 1786 – 16 September [O.S. 4 September] 1855) was a Russian classical scholar and politician who is best remembered as an influential statesman under Nicholas I of Russia.

== Biography ==
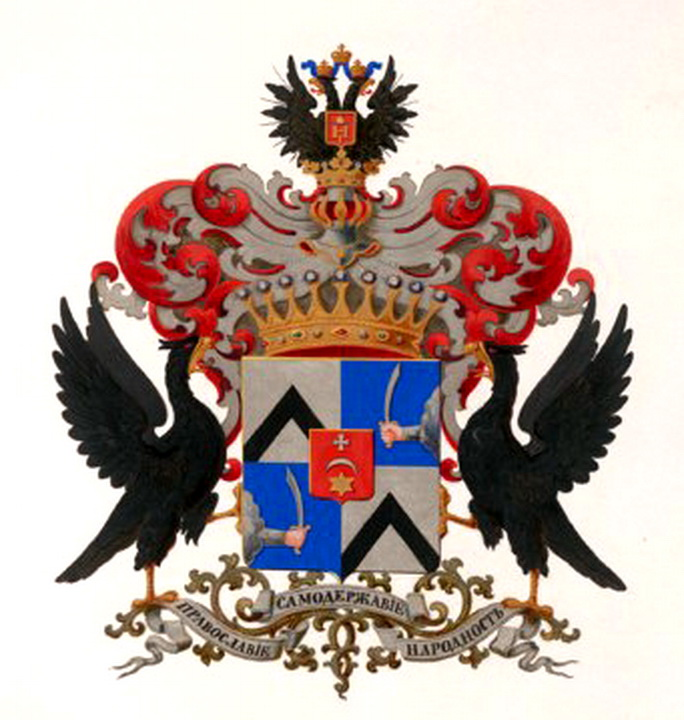
Coat of arms of the Counts Uvarov

Uvarov, connected through marriage with the Razumovsky family, published a number of works on Ancient Greek literature and archaeology, which brought him European renown. A confirmed conservative, he was on friendly terms with Alexander Humboldt, Madame de Stael, Goethe, Prince de Ligne, Nikolay Karamzin, and Vasily Zhukovsky. Uvarov studied in Göttingen, and from 1811 to 1822, he curated the Saint Petersburg educational district.

In 1832, Uvarov was appointed Deputy Minister of National Education, succeeding his father-in-law Count Alexey Razumovsky; in 1833 Uvarov was appointed Minister of National Education, until 1849. He was elected an Honorable Member of the Russian Academy of Sciences in 1811 and was the president of that venerable institution from 1818 until his death. In the wake of the Decembrist revolt of 1825, the Emperor moved to protect the status quo by centralizing the educational system. He wanted to neutralize the threat of foreign ideas and what he ridiculed as "pseudo-knowledge." However, Uvarov quietly promoted academic freedom and autonomy, raised academic standards, improved facilities, and opened higher education to the middle classes. By 1848 the Emperor, fearing the political upheavals in the West might cause uprisings in Europe, ended Uvarov's innovations.

Uvarov was responsible for coming up with the formula "Orthodoxy, Autocracy, and Nationality", the basis of his activities regarding public education. According to Uvarov’s theory, the Russian folk (narod) is very religious and devoted to the Emperor, so the Orthodox religion and Autocracy are unconditional bases of the existence of Russia. Nationality (narodnost) is deemed to be the necessity to follow independent national traditions and to fight foreign influence. The theory stated that it was necessary to reject western ideas – freedom of thought, freedom of personality, individualism, rationalism which were considered by Orthodox religion as dangerous and rebel thinking. The chief of Russian political police (the Third Section of His Majesty Personal Chancellery) Alexander von Benckendorff wrote that “the past of Russia was wonderful, the present is splendid and the future is above all dreams”. These three concepts were considered as "pillar-walls" of the Russian Empire. He worked to limit access to education by people of non-noble origin and strengthening governmental control over the universities and gymnasiums, once famously remarking, "No university Pugachevs." It means that only a small part of Russian population (only noble ones, many of them of foreign descent) had the possibility to get the education; it was almost impossible for Russian non-nobles (raznochynets) to get access to education. Within this meaning, the Narodnost (Nationality) meant that Russian folk had to stay away from education (Western influence) in order to preserve the folks' pure Russian national character.

The universities were small and closely monitored, especially the potentially dangerous philosophy departments. Their main mission was to train a loyal, athletic, masculinized senior bureaucracy that avoided the effeminacy of office work.

Despite these reactionary measures, Uvarov was also responsible for laying the foundations of high-quality education in Russia and reinstating the practice of sending Russian scientists abroad.

Uvarovite, the rarest of garnets, is named after him. His son Aleksey Uvarov co-founded the Russian Archaeological Society and the State Historical Museum in Moscow.

Uvarov's known relationship was with Prince Mikhail Alexandrovich Dondukov-Korsakov, who, according to persistent rumors reflected in Pushkin's scurrilous epigram, was owed his appointment in the Academy of Sciences to his homosexual relationship with Uvarov.

== Selected works ==
- Ouvaroff, M. (alternatively given as Sergei Semenovich Uvarov, or Sergey Uvarov, 1786-1855) (Translated from the French by J. D. Price) Essay on the Mysteries of Eleusis, London : Rodwell and Martin, 1817.
- Ouvaroff, Sergei, "Projet d'une Académie Asiatique," in Études de philologie et de critique. 2nd ed. (Paris: Didot Frères, 1845), 1-48

== Sources ==
- "Уваров, Сергей Семенович" . Brockhaus and Efron Encyclopedic Dictionary (in Russian). 1906.

Academic offices
| Preceded by Nikolay Nikolayevich Novosiltsev | President of the Russian Academy of Sciences; 1818–1855 | Succeeded by Dmitry Bludov |
