= Nikolay Pavlovich Ignatyev =

Russian statesman and diplomat (1832–1908)

Count Nikolay Pavlovich Ignatyev
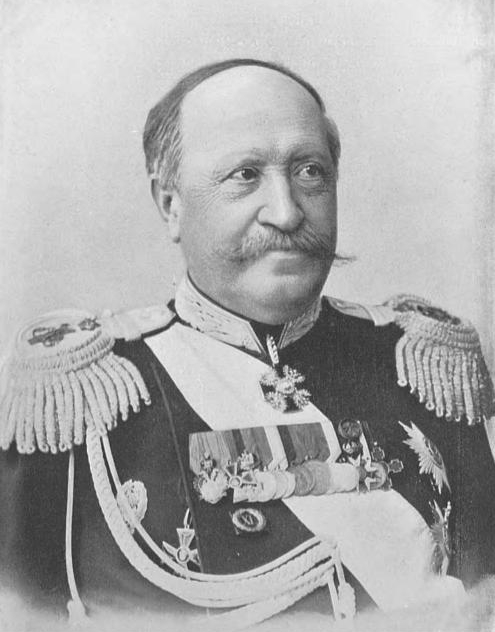
- Ignatyev in Beijing, c. 1900

Personal details
- Born: 29 January 1832 St Petersburg, Russia
- Died: 3 July 1908 (aged 76)
- Children: 8, including Pavel
- Occupation: Diplomat; statesman; politician; legislator

Count Nikolay Pavlovich Ignatyev (Note: Also historically spelled as Nicolai Ignatieff.) (Russian: Никола́й Па́влович Игна́тьев; 29 January [O.S. 17 January] 1832 – 3 July [O.S. 20 June] 1908) was a Russian Imperial statesman and diplomat who is best known for his policy of aggressive expansionism as the Russian ambassador to China and the Ottoman Empire. He was also the minister of the interior from 1881 to 1882, where he promoted ultraconservative and Slavic-nationalist policies.

In dealing with China, he secured a large slice of Chinese territory by the multi-lateral Treaty of Peking in 1860. As the Russian ambassador to the Ottoman Empire from 1864 to 1877, he worked to stir up pan-Slavic feeling and nationalism against the Ottomans. He encouraged his government to declare war on Turkey in 1877, and after the decisive Russian victory, he negotiated the Treaty of San Stefano in 1878. It heralded greatly strengthened Russian influence in the Balkans. However, Britain and Austria-Hungary intervened and forced the retraction of the treaty.

== Early life and military career ==
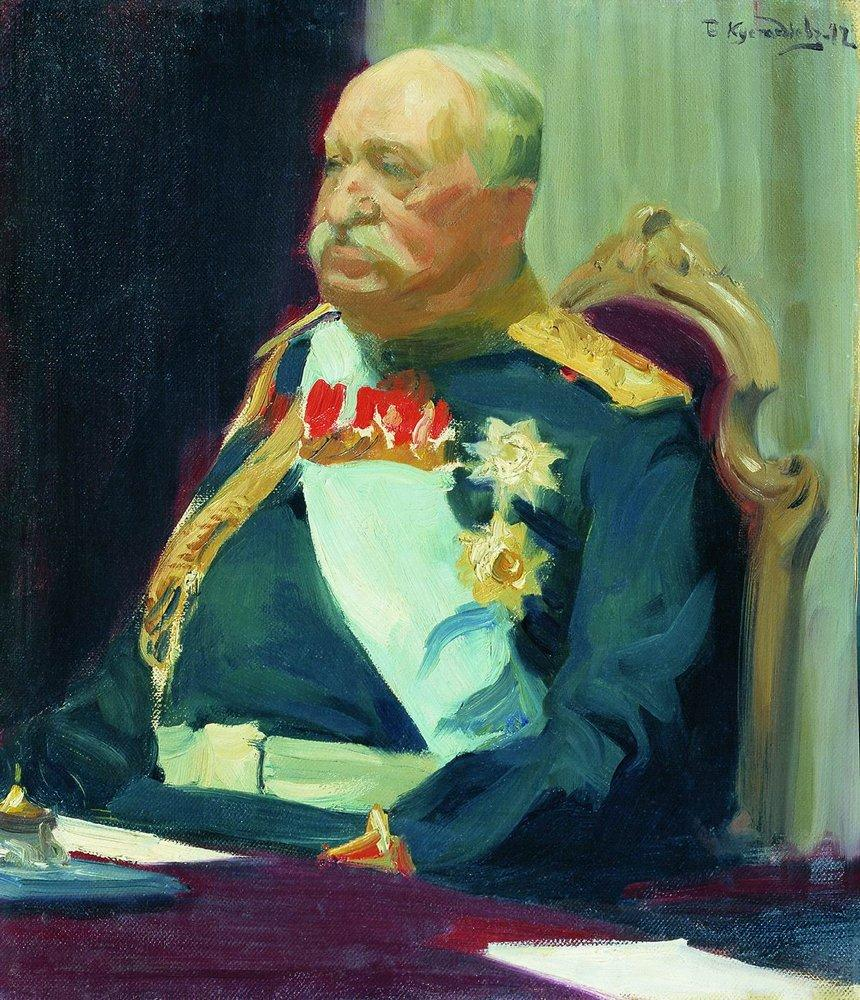
Count Nikolai Ignatyev, portrait study by Boris Kustodiev for Ilya Repin's The Ceremonial Sitting of the State Council, 1902

Nikolay Ignatyev was born in St Petersburg, to Maria Ivanovna Maltsova and Captain Pavel Nikolayevich Ignatyev. His father had been taken into favour by Tsar Nicholas I, owing to his fidelity on the occasion of the Decembrist revolt in 1825, and Grand Duke Alexander (later Tsar Alexander II) stood sponsor at the boy's baptism. After graduating from the Corps of Pages, at the age of seventeen he became an officer of the Russian Imperial Guard, serving with the Hussar Life Guards Regiment. Ignatyev was then appointed to the General Staff and become adjutant to the general commanding in the Estonian military district. He was promoted to major in 1856. During Ignatyev's subsequent career he was at odds with Count Pyotr Shuvalov, another Corps of Pages alumnus.

== Diplomatic career ==
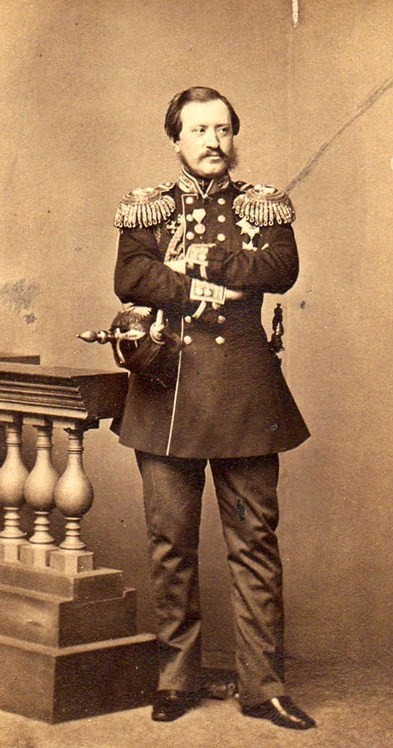
Count Ignatyev in the 1860s

Ignatyev's diplomatic career began at the Congress of Paris in 1856, after the Crimean War, where he participated in the negotiations regarding the demarcation of the Russo-Ottoman frontier on the lower Danube. He was then appointed as military attaché at the Russian Embassy in London. This assignment was a short one. According to the memoirs "Fifty Years of Service" written by his nephew Alexei Alexeyevich Count Ignatiev, Nikolay Ignatyev "inadvertently" pocketed a newly developed cartridge while inspecting the ordnance works of the British Army. In order to avoid diplomatic embarrassment he returned to Russia.

Two years later he was sent with a small escort on a dangerous mission to the Central Asian states of Khiva and Bukhara. The khan of Khiva laid a plan for detaining him as a hostage, but he eluded the danger and returned safely, after concluding a treaty of friendship with the emir of Bukhara.

Ignatyev's next diplomatic exploit was in the Far East, as plenipotentiary to the court of Peking. When the Chinese government was terrified by the advance of the Anglo-French expedition of 1860 and the burning of the Old Summer Palace in the Second Opium War, he worked on their fears so dexterously that, in the Convention of Peking, he obtained for Russia Outer Manchuria — not only the left bank of the Amur river, the original object of the mission, but also a large extent of territory and seacoast south of that river that would become the Russian "Maritime Province," the region of Primorsky Krai.

== The Balkans ==
Ignatyev's success was supposed to prove his capacity for dealing with "Orientals" and paved his way to the post of ambassador at Constantinople, which he occupied from 1864 to 1877. Here his chief aim was to liberate the Christian nationalities in general and the Bulgarians in particular from Ottoman domination and bring them under the influence of Russia (See also Bulgarian Exarchate and Constantinople Conference). His restless activity in this field, mostly of a semiofficial and secret character, culminated in the Russo-Turkish War of 1877–1878, at the close of which he negotiated with the Ottoman plenipotentiaries the Treaty of San Stefano. The terms of this treaty were aimed at creating an enlarged "Big Bulgaria", foreseen by Austria-Hungary and Britain as being under Russian domination. Ignatyev's "brilliant but reckless" initiatives proved to be a major diplomatic miscalculation for Russia.

As the war which he had done so much to bring about did not eventually secure for Russia advantages commensurate with the sacrifices involved, he fell into disfavour with Alexander II in part due to efforts of Count Pyotr Shuvalov, and retired from active service. Soon thereafter the Treaty of San Stefano was revised through the Treaty of Berlin, 1878, signed on Russia's behalf by Count Pyotr Shuvalov.

Although Count Ignatyev remained widely popular in Bulgaria and was even considered by some for the Bulgarian throne, the throne was eventually granted to Prince Ferdinand of Saxe-Coburg, his personal enemy.

== Later life ==
In the meantime Count Ignatyev served as Governor of Nizhny Novgorod, where he was credited with the expansion of the Makaryev Fair. Shortly after the accession of Alexander III in 1881, he was appointed Minister of the Interior on the understanding that he would carry out a nationalist, reactionary policy. In regards to the constitutional movement, he had personally told Alexander III that "the revolutionary movement could easily be crushed." After a period of intense, violent, destructive antisemitic rioting, known as pogroms, which some accused Ignatyev of fomenting, he issued the infamous "May Laws" in May 1882. Other sources suggest he in fact followed a government policy (not always enforced by local authorities) of strict suppression of rioters and protection of the Jewish population:

Nikolai Ignatiev, installed as Minister of the Interior in May 1881, decided on a policy of firm repression, although it was made difficult by the unforeseeable character of the outbreaks and his limited forces. Nevertheless, he ordered his men to fire upon rioters. In the towns of Borisov and Nezhin this resulted in fatalities. In Kiev, 1400 arrests were made. Many in the government felt this was still inadequate. The police chief of Kiev wrote apologetically to the Tsar that the local military tribunals had been too lenient with the rioters; Alexander III wrote in the margin: "This is inexcusable!"

He retired from office in June 1882. Explanations include that he was suspected of dishonesty or extortion, or that the Tsar feared he intended to introduce constitutional government by reviving the Zemsky Sobor (parliament). After that time he exercised no important influence in public affairs. He died in 1908.

== Personality ==
For his duplicity throughout his career, he has been referred to as "Lord Liar", and Simon Sebag Montefiore has suggested he may have suffered from Munchausen Syndrome. Turkish statesmen similarly called him "Mantör Pasha" (from French: Menteur, liar), as well as Ebu'l-Kizb (Ottoman Turkish: أبو الكذب, lit: Father of Lies). When Lord Salisbury, as Secretary of State for India, met Ignatyev he recalled that "he [Ignatyev] had the reputation, in a heavily contested field, of being the most accomplished liar in the Bosphorus."

== Honours ==
- Graf Ignatiev Street, a busy trade street in Sofia, the capital of Bulgaria, is named after Nikolay Ignatiev.

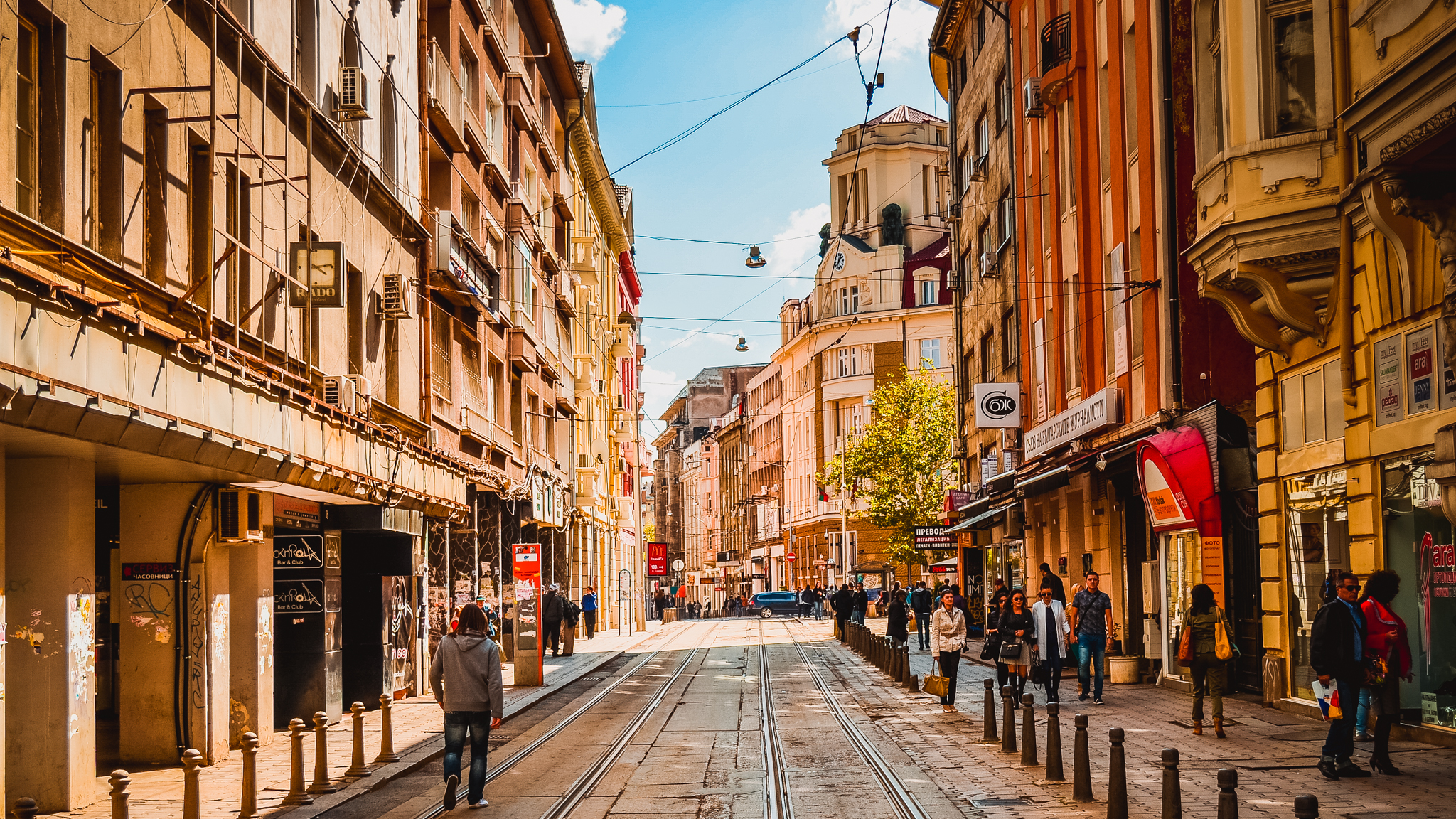
Graf Ignatiev Street

- The elite Count Ignatiev Primary School, one of the oldest in Sofia, carries his name.

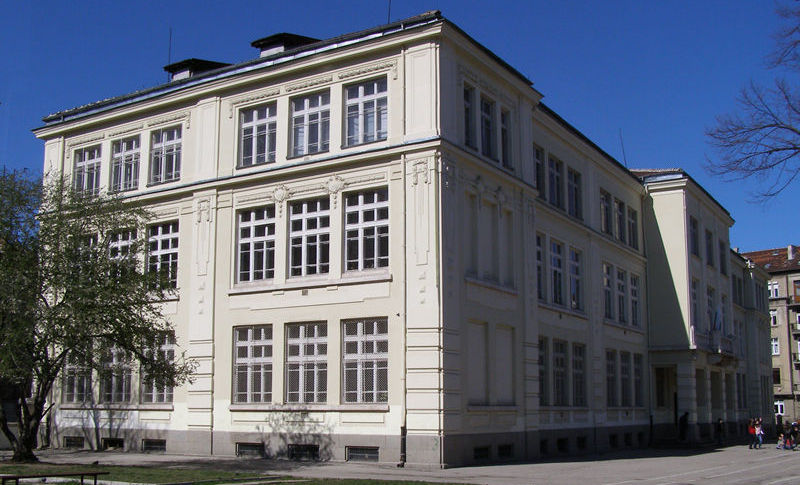
Count Ignatiev Primary School

- The Bulgarian villages of Graf Ignatievo in Plovdiv Province and Ignatievo in Varna Province are named in his honour.

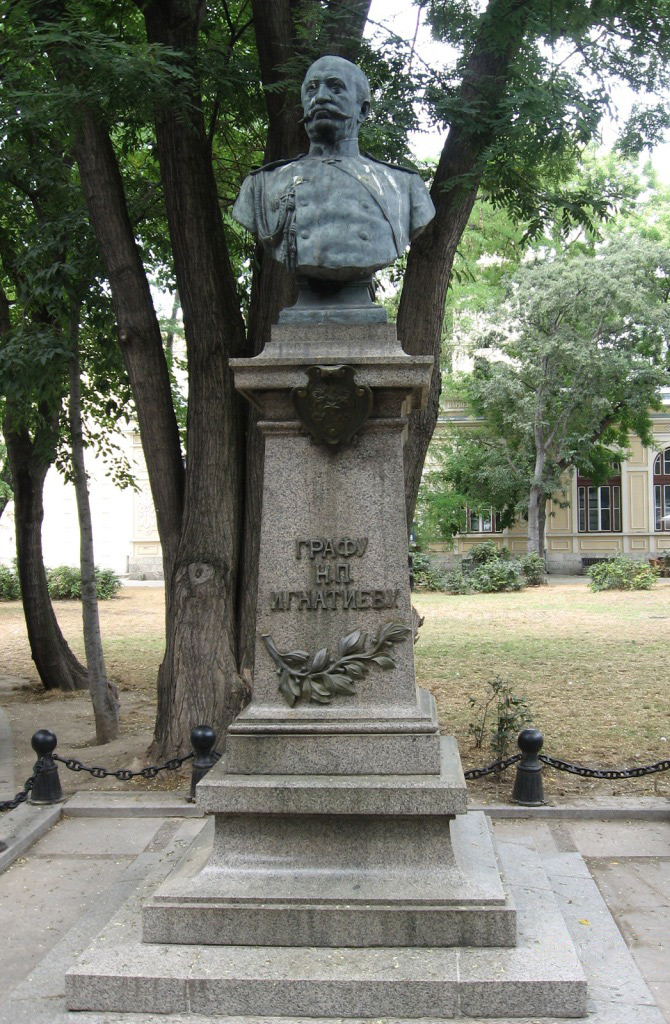
An Ignatiev monument in Varna

- Mount Ignatiev on Graham Land in Antarctica is also named after him.

== Personal life ==
Count Nikolay Ignatiev was married to Yekaterina Leonidovna Galitzina (1842–1917), daughter of Prince Leonid Mikhailovich Galitzine and Anna Matveyevna Tolstaïa.

Their eight children included Ignatiev's son, Count Pavel Ignatiev, who served as the last Minister of Education under Tsar Nicholas II and later moved to Canada. His grandson, George Ignatieff, was born in Russia and became a Canadian diplomat, and his great-grandson, Michael Ignatieff, is an academic and was the leader of the Liberal Party of Canada from 2008 to 2011.

Other sons of Count Ignatiev included: - General Nikolai Nikolaevich Ignatiev (1872–1962), commander of the Preobrazhensky Regiment of the Imperial Guard; - Alexey Nikolaevich Ignatiev (1874–1948), last governor of Kiev under Tsarist rule.

== In fiction ==
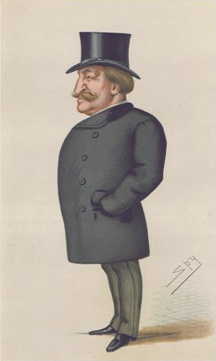
Nikolay Pavlovich Ignatyev portrayed by Spy in Vanity Fair 14 April 1877

In the novel Flashman at the Charge (1973) by George MacDonald Fraser, Ignatyev appears as a Russian military staff officer, who in 1854 presents a proposal to the Tsar of a Russian invasion of British-held India. He reappears in the 1975 novel Flashman in the Great Game as a fomenter of the Indian Rebellion of 1857. In both novels he is a villain: Fraser portrays him as intelligent and refined, but also ruthless, cruel, savage and dangerous.

== Sources ==
Preceded by Pavel Pavlovich Gagarin	Chairman of the Committee of Ministers; 9 March 1872 – 1 January 1880	Succeeded by Pyotr Aleksandrovich Valuyev
Preceded by Mikhail Tarielovich Loris-Melikov	Minister of Interior; 1881 – June 1882	Succeeded by Dmitriy Tolstoy
