= Paul Ignatieff =

Russian politician (1870–1945)

Count Paul Ignatieff
- Павел Игнатьев
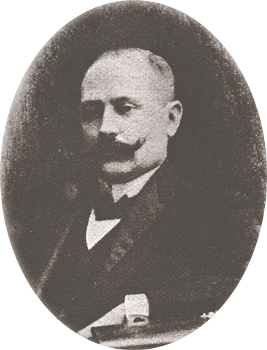

24th Russian Minister of Education
- In office January 9, 1915 – December 27, 1916
- Monarch: Nicholas II
- Preceded by: Lev Kasso
- Succeeded by: Nikolai Kulchitsky

Personal details
- Born: Pavel Nikolayevich Ignatiev; 12 July [O.S. 30 June] 1870 Constantinople, Ottoman Empire
- Died: August 12, 1945 (aged 75) Upper Melbourne, Quebec, Canada
- Spouse: Natalia Meshcherskaya
- Children: 7, including George
- Parent: Nicolai Ignatieff (father)

Count Pavel Nikolayevich Ignatiev (sometimes rendered in English as Paul Ignatieff; Russian: Па́вел Никола́евич Игна́тьев; 12 July [O.S. 30 June] 1870 – August 12, 1945) was a Russian politician who served as the minister of education during the reign of Nicholas II. He was the son of Count Nikolay Pavlovich Ignatyev, who served as the minister of the Interior under Alexander III. After the October Revolution brought the Bolsheviks into power, Ignatieff fled Russia with his family, ultimately ending up in Canada.

== Life and family ==
Ignatieff married Princess Natalia Nikolayevna Meshcherskaya (1877-1944) in Nice, France, on April 16, 1903. They would have seven children, all boys, two of whom died as infants.

He was a graduate of the University of Kiev. Afterward, he entered the Imperial Ministry of Agriculture, eventually becoming a director of one of its departments in 1909. He was appointed in 1912 as Assistant Minister of Agriculture. In 1915, during the First World War, he was appointed Minister of Education. He held that position until December 1916.

During the October Revolution, Ignatieff was arrested and was to be executed. However, he was spared by the Polish commissar overseeing his execution, who said that Ignatieff was a good man because he had implemented progressive policies such as Polish language rights while Education Minister. Ignatieff and his family then fled to England in 1919 and lived on a farm in Sussex, before moving to Canada.

In 1925, the family immigrated to Canada and settled permanently three years later in Upper Melbourne in Quebec, where he died on August 12, 1945.

One of Ignatieff's sons, George, was a prominent Canadian diplomat. One of his grandsons, Michael Ignatieff, is an author, Harvard professor, former Canadian Member of Parliament and former leader of the Liberal Party of Canada.

== Sources ==
- Ignatieff, Michael. The Russian album. New York, N.Y.: Viking, 1987.
- "Countess Ignatieff". New York Times, 30 Aug 1944: 17.
- Index with link to Ignatieff genealogical information
- "Nicholas Ignatieff". New York Times, 30 Mar 1952: 93.
- Out of My Past: The Memoirs of Count Kokovtsov Edited by H.H. Fisher and translated by Laura Matveev; Stanford University Press, 1935.
- The Memoirs of Count Witte Edited and translated by Sydney Harcave; Sharpe Press, 1990.

Preceded by Lev Kasso	Russian Minister of Education; 1915–1916	Succeeded by Nikolai Kulchitsky
