= Dmitry Bludov =

Imperial Russian official

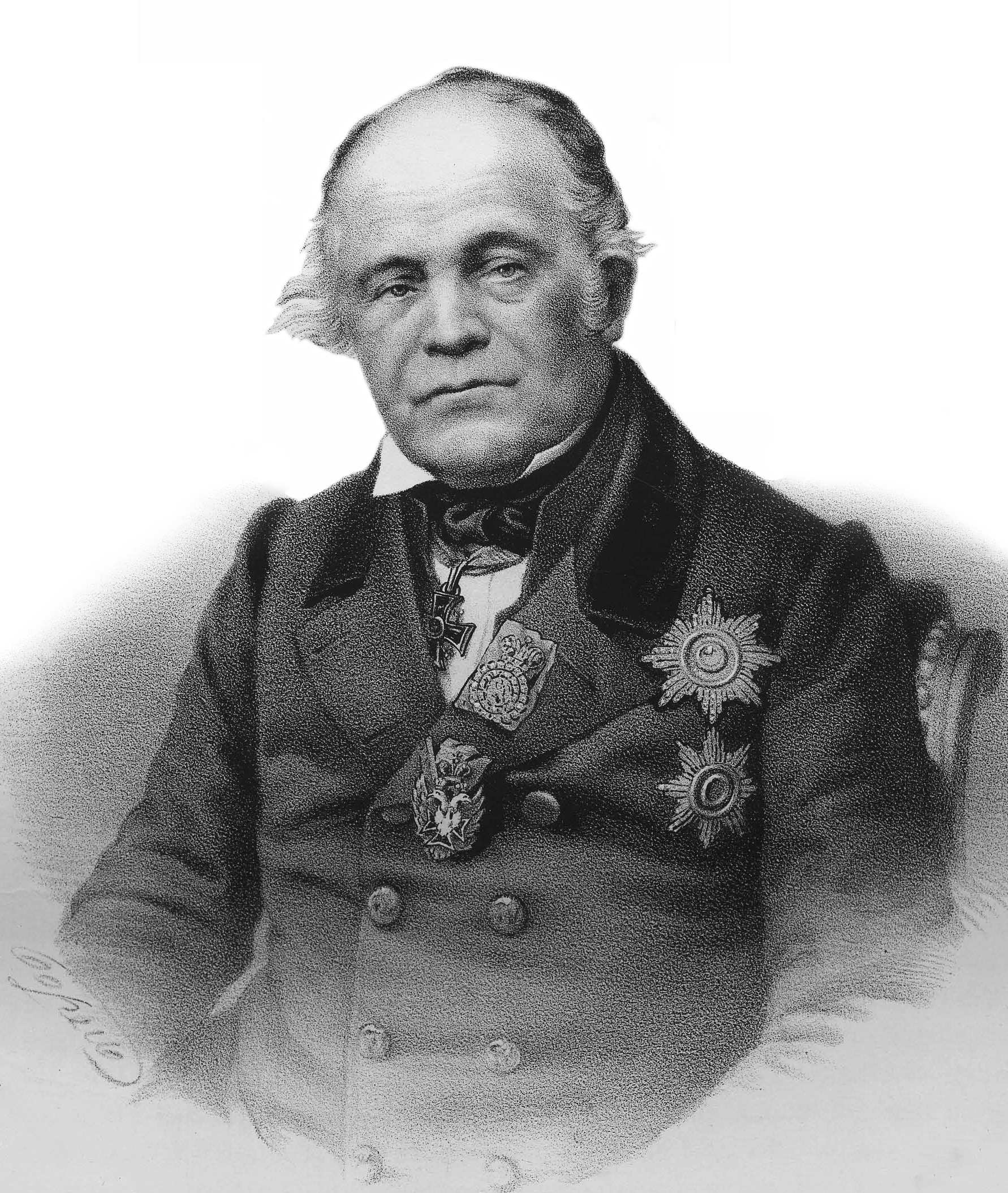
Dmitry Bludov

Count Dmitry Nikolayevich Bludov (Russian: Граф Дми́трий Никола́евич Блу́дов; 1785–1864) was an Imperial Russian official who filled a variety of posts under Nicholas I - Deputy Education Minister (1826–28), Minister of Justice (1830–31, 1838–39), Minister of the Interior (1832–38), Chief of the Second Section (1839–62). Alexander II appointed him President of the Academy of Sciences (1855) and Chairman of the State Council (1862).

Despite his distinguished official career, Bludov is also notable for his literary background. He was related by blood to Gavrila Derzhavin and Vladislav Ozerov. He was also a founding member of the Arzamas Society, with Cassandra as his alias. Bludov's personal friends included Nikolay Karamzin and Vasily Zhukovsky. It was Bludov who edited and published their posthumous works. Antonina Bludova, a writer and salon-holder, was his daughter.

Bludov headed the Russian embassy in London in 1817–20. Although on friendly terms with many of the Decembrists, Bludov presided over the court that condemned them to death. During Nicholas I's reign he was considered one of the more liberal officials. He was in charge of reorganizing the courts and drafting a new criminal code (adopted in 1845). Bludov's extensive diaries have never been published.

Leo Tolstoy described Bludov's house on Nevsky Avenue as the place "where writers, and in general, the best people of the time would gather. I remember that I read Two Hussars there for the first time. Bludov was a man who was at one time close to the Decembrists and sympathetic in spirit to the whole progressive movement. All the same he continued in government service under Nicholas".

In 1830, Carl Friedrich von Ledebour in 'Icones Plantarum' (Icon. Pl.) Vol.2 page5 named an iris with specific name of Iris bloudowii after Dmitry.

Political offices
Preceded by Aleksey Fyodorovich Orlov	Chairman of the Committee of Ministers; 1861–1864	Succeeded by Pavel Pavlovich Gagarin
Academic offices
Preceded by Sergey Uvarov	President of the Russian Academy of Sciences; 1855–1864	Succeeded by Fyodor Litke
