= Antonina Bludova =

Russian philanthropist, salonist, memoirist and lady-in-waiting

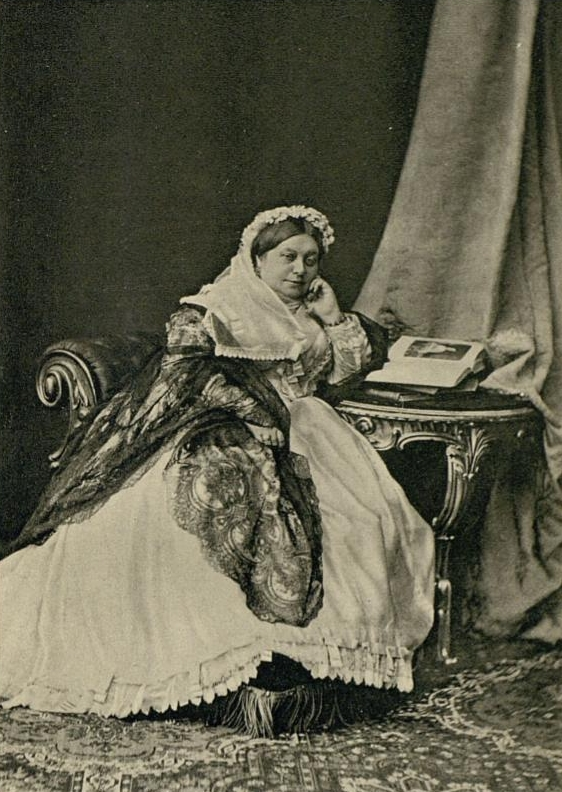
Antonina Bludova

Countess Antonina Dmitrievna Bludova (Антонина Дмитриевна Блудова; 25 April 1813 – 9 April 1891) was a Russian philanthropist, salonist, memoirist and lady-in-waiting.

Antonina Bludova was the eldest child of Count Dmitry Bludov, one of Nicholas I's trusted ministers and advisors. She was born in Stockholm, where her father was on the Russian embassy staff. From an early age, she met Alexander Pushkin, Vasily Zhukovsky, Nikolai Gogol, Mikhail Lermontov, Aleksey Khomyakov and other successful authors. Her salon was one of the most fashionable in Saint Petersburg, serving as a vital link between the imperial court and the Slavophile (or Pan-Slavist) circles. She was made a senior lady-in-waiting in 1863.

After her father's death in 1864, this influential spinster decided to leave the capital in order to devote herself to Christian causes. She founded an Orthodox bratstvo in Ostrog which included an elementary school, a school for girls, a public library, a hospital, a drug store and a home for pilgrims travelling to the Pochayev Monastery. She died in Moscow at the age of 77 and was buried in the Novodevichy Convent. Her memoirs were published in 1889.
