= Ivan Ivanovich Tolstoy =

Russian politician (1858–1916)

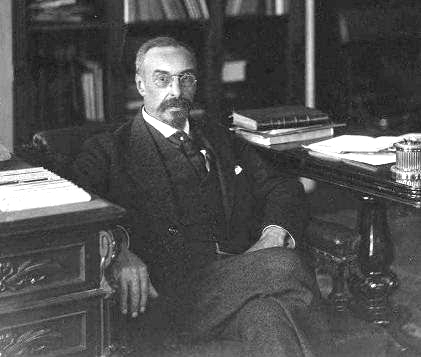
Ivan Ivanovich Tolstoy

Count Ivan Ivanovich Tolstoy (1858–1916) was an Imperial Russian politician.

== Life ==
His father was Russian diplomat Ivan Matveyevich Tolstoy. His brother was Dmitry Ivanovich Tolstoy (1860–1941), who was director of the Hermitage in Saint Petersburg.

He served as Vice President of the Russian Imperial Academy of Arts while Grand Duke Vladimir Alexandrovich was Academy President. He later served as Imperial Minister of Education in the Witte Government.

Preceded by Vladimir Glazov	Minister of Education; July 1905 – February 1906	Succeeded by Pyotr Kaufman
