= Lev Kasso =

Russian politician (1865–1914)

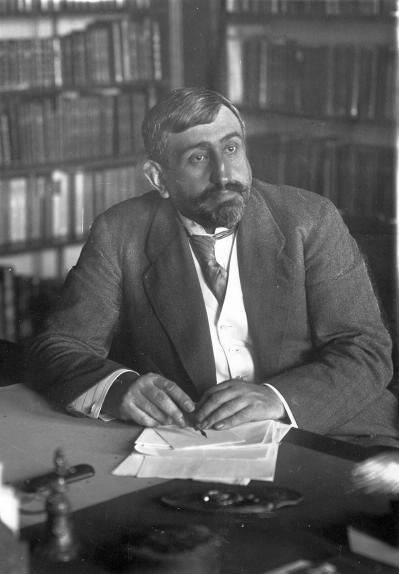
Lev Kasso in 1913

Lev Aristidovich Kasso (Russian: Лев Аристидович Кассо; 1865–1914) was a Russian politician. A professor of civil law by education, he served as the minister of national education from 1910 to 1914 in the Stolypin and Kokovtsov governments.

The state's university policy remained in Kasso's hands until his own death in 1914. The rift between the state and the professoriate continued to grow. In a move ostensibly made to train more professors and alleviate the serious problem of "vacant chairs," Kasso proposed, in November 1911, the opening of special seminars for selected graduate students in Berlin, Tübingen, and Paris. Modeled on a similar scheme in the 1880s, Kasso's plan undermined the right of Russian professors to train their successors. To add insult to injury, the candidates would be chosen by the Ministry of Education rather than by the professors themselves. The Academy of Sciences labeled the scheme a "needless abasement of the dignity of Russian science." But even in the face of intensely hostile public opinion, the Council of Ministers approved Kasso's scheme, albeit with a marked lack of enthusiasm.

The shortage of qualified professors was one reason the minister of education cited for opposing requests from numerous zemstvos and cities for more universities. On 20 January 1911, the Council of Ministers ordered Kasso to report on the future direction of the nation's higher-education policy. The directive recognized a special need to expand facilities in higher technical education.

On 9 February 1912, the Council of Ministers met to consider Kasso's conclusions. Kasso stated that there was a particular need for medical, veterinary, and agricultural education but argued against a general policy commitment to the expansion of higher education. The study group chaired by Kasso considered requests for new universities in Rostov and Tiflis; polytechnics in Samara, Perm, Ekaterinburg, and Nizhni Novgorod; the expansion of Tomsk University, and new veterinary institutes

== See also ==
- Kasso Case

Preceded by Aleksand Shvarts	Minister of Education; 1910 – 1914	Succeeded by Pavel Ignatieff
