= Pavel Gagarin =

Russian statesman

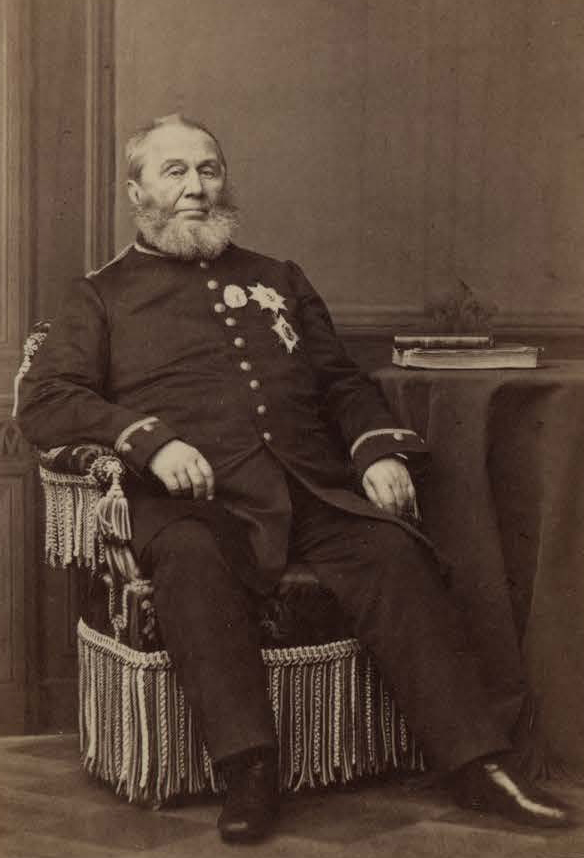
Pavel Pavlovich Gagarin

Prince Pavel Pavlovich Gagarin (Russian: Па́вел Па́влович Гага́рин; 4 (15) March 1789 in Moscow – 21 February (4 March) 1872 in Saint Petersburg) was a Russian statesman from the Rurikid Gagarin family.

He was the posthumous child of Prince Pavel Sergeyevich Gagarin (1747–89), the Commander of the Moscow Kremlin. After his mother's death in 1800, Pavel and his elder brother Andrew were brought up at a private boarding school in Moscow.

He started his career as an aide-de-camp to Mikhail Miloradovich and other notable commanders but, citing ill health, moved to the civil service in 1809. He married Maria, the only daughter of Georg Johann von Glasenapp, Vice-Roy of Siberia. She became known as "the Princess Termagant" for her dreadful character and haughty manners.

As a senior member of the Governing Senate in the reign of Nicholas I, Prince Gagarin inspected several governorates and led a commission investigating the activities of Dostoyevsky and other members of the Petrashevsky Circle. Many years later, Gagarin was also responsible for investigating Dmitry Karakozov's attempt to assassinate Alexander II of Russia.

After Alexander's accession to the throne, Gagarin was involved, together with Yakov Rostovtsev, in the activities of a secret committee that prepared the Emancipation Reform of 1861. Always keen to support the party of wealthy landowners, Gagarin was made Chairman of the Committee of Ministers in 1864.

He was also in charge of the State Council during Count Bludov's final illness and for several months following his death. He had eight children, including Sergey, the governor of Archangel, and Varvara, the wife of Dmitry Sontsov.

Preceded by Dmitry Nikolayevich Bludov	Chairman of the Committee of Ministers; 1865–1872	Succeeded by Nikolay Pavlovich Ignatyev
