= Enterochromaffin cell =

Cell type

Details

Identifiers
- Latin: endocrinocytus EC
- MeSH: D004759
- TH: H3.04.02.0.00029
- FMA: 62934

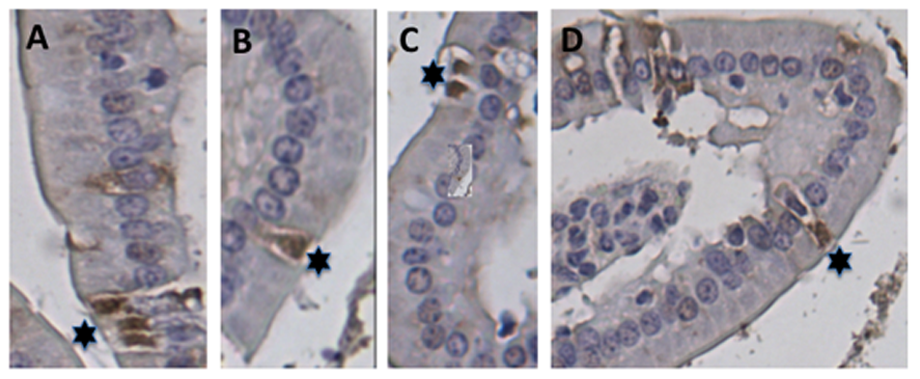
Localization of Enterochromaffin cells (EC-cells) in the small intestine of mice. The EC cells were identified in all segments of the small intestine. (A) Ileum, (B–D) duodenum. Stars indicate chromogranin A containing-EC cells.

Enterochromaffin cells (EC cells), also known as Kulchitsky cells, are a type of enteroendocrine cell and neuroendocrine cell. They reside within the epithelium lining the lumen of the digestive tract and regulate gastrointestinal function, particularly intestinal motility and secretion. They were discovered by Nikolai Kulchitsky.

EC cells modulate neuron signalling in the enteric nervous system (ENS) through the secretion of the neurotransmitter serotonin and other peptides. Because enteric afferent and efferent nerves do not protrude into the intestinal lumen, EC cells act as a form of sensory transduction. They form functional connections with sensory nerve fibers, releasing serotonin onto 5-HT_{3} receptors on the terminals of vagal and spinal afferents. Gut sensory epithelial cells that signal neurons through synapses are termed neuropod cells; serotonin is the transmitter in EC cells, whereas the nutrient-sensing neuropod cells of the small intestine release glutamate. Whether these constitute one population or distinct, partly overlapping ones remains under discussion.

Serotonin in the ENS acts in synergy with other digestive hormones to regulate sensory and motor gastrointestinal reflexes. EC cells respond to chemical and neural stimuli, and are also reactive to mechanosensation, as in the peristaltic reflex of the gut, where they can be stimulated by a bolus moving through the bowel. Upon activation they release serotonin onto serotonin receptors on ENS neurons; depending on concentration, serotonin modulates peristaltic contraction and secretion through activation of smooth muscle and glands, respectively.

EC cells are among the cells that prompted the paraneuron concept, proposed by Tsuneo Fujita in 1977 and developed with Tomio Kanno and Shigeru Kobayashi. The concept grouped epithelial and endocrine cells that share defining properties with neurons — secretory granules, receptor-bearing surfaces, and regulated release of transmitter-like substances — as relatives of neurons rather than a separate class of cell. Pulmonary neuroendocrine cells in the respiratory tract, known as bronchial Kulchitsky cells, belong to the same grouping.

== Structure ==
EC cells are small polygonal cells located in the crypts between intestinal villi. They are discriminated from other cells of the gastrointestinal epithelial crypts by the presence of basally located granulations that contain serotonin and other peptides. Ultrastructurally, these granules are reported to vary in size and shape and are considered pleomorphic.

Most EC cells communicate with the lumen of intestinal crypts through apical microvilli (protrusions) and are referred to as "open". A proportion of EC cells do not protrude into the crypt lumen and are subsequently referred to as 'closed'. EC cells typically extend down to the basal lamina with cytoplasmic extensions known to pass through the connective tissue and neighbouring glands. Tissue beneath EC cells typically contains abundant fenestrated capillaries, lymph vessels and small unmyelinated nerve fibres. Secreted serotonin can either be taken up into residing vessels (transported in the blood by platelets) or act on nerve synaptic terminals.

=== Distribution ===
EC cells are found aggregated in specific locations throughout the gastrointestinal tract, predominantly in the small intestine, colon and appendix. The proportion of high-density cell populations varies between species attributed to differences in dietary requirements and physiological characteristics.

=== Enterochromaffin-like cells ===
Enterochromaffin-like cells (ECL cells) are a population of cells that are found in the gastric glands of the stomach luminal epithelium and secrete histamine. In response to gastrin released by neighbouring G-cells, secreted histamine from ECL cells acts on parietal cells to stimulate the release of gastric acid. The presence of ECL cells is critical in regulation of endocrine-induced gastric acid secretion. ECL cells histologically appear similar to EC cells and are hence named as such. They are however a different cell type and do not possess any serotonin synthesizing mechanisms.

== Development ==
In developing chick embryos, EC cells have been found in biopsies of developing GIT tissue before the migration of neural crest cells. Whilst EC cells have neuroendocrine properties and are similar chemically and histologically to cells of the adrenal medulla they are not derivatives of the neural crest and do not share a similar cell progenitor. EC cells are believed to be derived from endodermal origins and are descended from the stem cells that form other epithelial cell types of the gastrointestinal lumen.

== Function ==
The primary function of EC cells is to synthesise and secrete serotonin for modulation of gastrointestinal neurons. Serotonin, also named 5-hydroxytryptamine (5HT), can be classified as a hormone, neurotransmitter and a mitogen. It is primarily known for its role in the central nervous system but plays an important role in the periphery, with the largest endogenous pool of serotonin residing in the gut (90% of endogenous store). In the ENS, serotonin is an essential modulator of sensory transduction and mucus secretion. Release of serotonin from EC cells can be triggered by a multitude of stimuli, particularly luminal distension, parasympathetic innervation or changes in osmotic concentrations in intestinal contents.

Serotonin

=== Serotonin synthesis ===
The synthesis of 5-HT, in EC cells, is catalyzed by the enzyme tryptophan hydroxylase 1 (TpH1) from the amino acid L-tryptophan. The reaction proceeds in two stages with an initial rate limiting step involving the conversion of L-tryptophan to 5-hydroxytryptophan (5-HTP). Following conversion to 5-HTP, the non-rate limiting L-amino acid decarboxylase converts 5-HTP to 5-HT by decarboxylation. Following synthesis, 5-HT is then stored in vesicles by vesicular monoamine transporter 1 close to the basal margin of the cell for eventual secretion.

Release of the vesicles occurs after chemical, neurological or mechanical stimulation of the EC cells and is predominantly calcium dependent, suggesting excretion via exocytosis. The combined effect of increased calcium flux and a liberation of stored calcium within the cell changes the cell potential triggering release of the 5-HT vesicles. The vesicles pass from the basal margin into the surrounding lamina propria for interaction with nearby nerve synapses, lymph and blood vessels.

The serotonin synthesised by EC cells is predominately exocytosed from the basal border, but is also known to be apically secreted into the lumen of the gut and can be present in faecal samples. Secreted 5-HT acts on different receptor subtypes found localised in cells in the gastrointestinal epithelium, smooth muscle and connective tissue with responsiveness dependent on the concentration of the secreted hormone.

The primary effect of serotonin involves the increase in peristaltic contraction through its effects on both ENS neurons and smooth muscle. 5-HT also activates a neural secretory response, whereby binding at 5-HT1P receptors on myenteric neurons triggers a signalling cascade in the submucosal plexus. This results in the release of acetylcholine to initiate secretion from the gut mucosa via release of chloride ions.

== Clinical significance ==
=== Irritable bowel syndrome ===
Irritable bowel syndrome (IBS) is a diverse condition associated with chronic bowel discomfort and abdominal pain that ranges in severity between patients. Abnormal concentrations of serotonin have been associated with IBS, predominantly increased concentrations intensifying gastrointestinal motility and mucosal secretions from the gut mucosa. Severe IBS often manifests as either chronic constipation or chronic diarrhoea, and abnormal EC cell populations have been correlated with both conditions. In patients suffering post-infectious IBS, rectal biopsies have shown a dramatic increase in populations of EC cells associated with diarrhoeal symptoms.

Likewise, reduced populations of EC cells in patients suffering chronic constipation have been observed, indicating a lack of 5-HT, and therefore decreased GI motility and secretion. Ongoing research indicates that abnormal EC cell populations, and therefore 5-HT signalling, may significantly contribute to gastrointestinal dysfunction. Treatment using 5-HT-receptor agonists for patients with functional constipation have shown some effectiveness in achieving normal GI functionality.

=== Carcinoid syndrome ===
Carcinoid syndrome is a rare condition characterized by an abnormal increase in circulating biologically active hormones, largely serotonin, with early symptoms involving diarrhea, abdominal cramping and episodic flushing. Excess circulating serotonin is usually manufactured by EC-cell-originated carcinoid tumors in the small bowel or appendix. Tumors are slow growing, but can metastasise to the liver if aggressive. They can also be present at other sites, particularly the lung and stomach.

== History ==
The name 'enterochromaffin' comes from the Greek word "enteron" (ἔντερον), in relation to intestines, and "chromaffin" as a grouping of the words chromium and affinity, as they can be visualised by staining with chromium salts. Similarly named, chromaffin cells (of the adrenal medulla) share this characteristic and are histologically similar to EC cells. Their embryological origins, however, are quite different, nor do they possess similar functions.

== See also ==
- Carcinoid syndrome
- Serotonin
- List of human cell types derived from the germ layers
- List of distinct cell types in the adult human body
