= Mitrofan Dovnar-Zapolsky =

Belarusian historian (1867–1934)

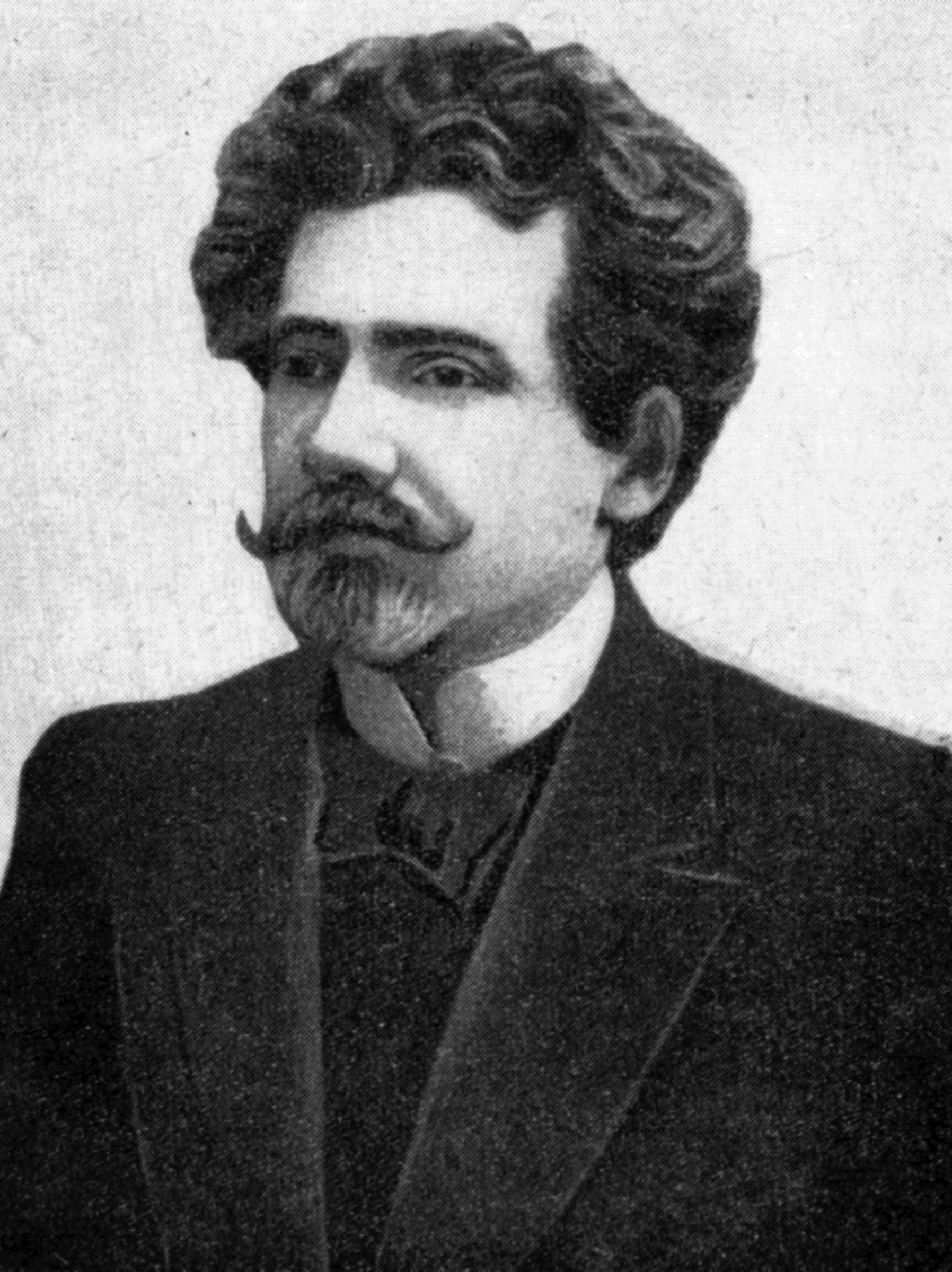
Dovnar-Zapol'skiy, supposedly in c.1890s—1900s.

Mitrofan Viktorovich Dovnar-Zapol'skiy (Belarusian: Мітрафан Віктаравіч Доўнар-Запольскі, Russian: Митрофан Викторович Довнар-Запольский; 14 June [O.S. 2 June] 1867, Rechytsa, Minsk Governorate – 30 September 1934, Moscow) was a historian, ethnographer, and diplomat of Belarusian origin. He hailed from the family of land-less smaller nobility and was the son of Collegiate Secretary.

He was the author of more than 150 works on the history of Kievan Rus', Muscovy, 19th-century Russia, Lithuania and Belarus, on the social-political movement, peasants' question and the ethnography of Belarus. Notably, the majority of his works were of a scientific-analytical nature. He extensively sourced his works on the materials from more than 20 archives in Moscow, Saint Petersburg, Kyiv, Vilna, Warsaw, Kraków, Lviv, Kostroma, Yaroslavl, Novgorod, Nyasvizh etc. Many of his works remain unpublished. He was awarded the Order of Saint Vladimir 4th grade (April 1916) for his scientific work.

== Biography ==
An alumnus of the historical-philological faculty of Kyiv University (1893), he wrote a magister dissertation on history in Fall 1901 and a doctoral dissertation on history in 1906. He became professor at Moscow University (1899) and professor of Russian history at Kyiv University in 1902. He was the organiser and director of the Higher Commercial Courses (Kyiv, 1906), one of the organizers and the first head of the South-Western Branch of the Russian Exports Chamber (1912), and head of several popular-scientific circles and societies in Kyiv.

After a conflict with students of Kyiv Commercial Institute (1917) and the "Case of Stashevskiy" (1917), Dovnar-Zapol'skiy resigned from almost all professorial work. He then became professor at the Kharkiv Institute of People's Economy in December 1919 and at Kharkiv University in 1920, remaining there until 1921. He was also pro-rector of Azerbaijan University and professor of the Baku Polytechnical Institute from 1922 to 1925. Following that he was professor of Belarusian history at the Belarusian State University from October 1925 to Fall 1926, creating the Archeographical Commission of Inbelkult together with Dovgyallo in 1925. After the forced move to Moscow in the fall of 1926, he frequently had to seek occupation outside the field of science. He was professor at Timiryazev Academy in the 1930s. In the 1920s and 1930s, he occupied several management positions in the system of management of the economy in Soviet Ukraine, Azerbaijan, Belarus and Russia.

== In politics ==
He participated in then-illegal movements of the 1880s and was temporary banned to settle in Kyiv. Later, he sympathised with left movements.

Dovnar-Zapol'skiy actively supported the Belarusian People's Republic (BPR), headed the Belarusian Chamber of Commerce in Kyiv in 1918 (confirmed by the Belarus People's Secretariat on 24 April 1918), and prepared the project of the creation of the Belarusian University in Minsk at the end of March 1918. From May to October 1918, he participated in the work of the BPR's diplomatic mission in Kyiv, which sought the recognition of the BPR from representatives of Soviet Russia, Ukraine, Don, Germany and Austro-Hungary.

At the request of the BPR's authorities, he prepared the notable informational "Memorandum" ("Foundations of statehood of Belarus"), published in Grodno and Vilna in 1919 in Belarusian, Russian, Polish, German and French languages; also translated to English by P. Clark. This Memorandum contained the historical ground for the necessity of creation of independent Belarusian state and was presented at the Versailles conference by the BPR's delegation, albeit without positive outcome.

His two sons perished in the ranks of Red Army during the Russian Civil War.

His printed but unpublished book "History of Belarus" caused outrage among the Belarusian political authorities (beg. 1926), was denounced as a "Cathechism of Belarusian National Democratism", and was subsequently banned; the manuscript was confiscated. Consequently, Dovnar-Zapol'skiy was forced to move to Moscow, effectively exiled (Fall 1926), and never after returned to Belarus.

From 1930 to 1934, he was heavily criticised for the alleged "Neo-Narodnichestvo", attributed the authorship of the ideological basis of "National Democratism", equated to the "agents of fascism" by acad. V.K. Shcherbakov, politically denounced together with his scientific school by his former pupil prof. A.P. Ogloblin (Kyiv, 1934).

== In science ==
Pupil of professors Golubovskiy, Ikonnikov, and especially V.B. Antonovich, he sought to emulate the combination of scientific and educational activities, as manifested by P. Shafarik, V. Karajic, and N.I. Kostomarov.

He denounced the view of Belarusians as being devoid of nationality, and was a decided promoter and supporter of Belarusian national revival in the beginning of the 20th century. Dovnar-Zapol'skiy greeted the emergence of the "strictly objective and scientific" trend in Belarusian historical and ethnographical research. He showed general sympathy with Marxist theory but wasn't awed by it.

=== Historical concepts ===
Dovnar-Zapol'skiy promoted the concept of primacy of the history of people over the history of states and considered ethnography and economics to be highly important, if not chief factors, in studying the history of society.

As part of his research into Belarusian history, he postulated the existence of Belarusian nationality with its own history, distinct ethnographical features, rich folk culture, with Belarusian language being heir of the speech of the Krivichi and the Dregovichs. He supported "colonisational theory" of emergence of state in Belarus, and considered Krivichi and Dregovichs largely to be isolated from Ancient Rus' state and therefore evolving differently. Dovnar-Zapol'skiy also postulated the absence of ethnographical unity in Ancient Rus' state, with external political and military affairs being the only binding factors in it.

He viewed the creation of Great Duchy of Lithuania and Rus' in the 13th century as partially peacefully created and mutually beneficial union between the princes of weakened Rus' and militant Lithuanian princes.

He also considered both the Lublin Union and Church Union to have been negative factors in Belarusian history, claiming they promote religious intolerance. He also disapproved of the incorporation of Belarusian land into Russia after the Polish–Lithuanian Commonwealth partitions. Generally, he considered "two evils" to have influenced Belarusian history negatively: the Polish "szlachta aristocratical republic" and the Russian "boyar oligarchy". He disapproved of both, as these excluded demos, being therefore perilous to the Belarusian people who are "highly democratic in their historical and folk traditions".

Later in the 1920s, the historian further emphasised the economical factor in history and the significance of class struggle in the history of the Great Duchy.

== Viewed by others ==
His person and works attracted all sorts of polarized opinions. Up to the 1930s, he was regarded generally positively by M.K. Lyubavskiy, V.I. Picheto, F.F. Turuk, D.I. Dovgyallo and others. Beginning in the 1930s, he fell under stigmatizing critique and denunciation as a scientist by S.Ya. Vol'fson, V.M. Pertsev, V.K. Shcherbakov and others. In the 1940s—1970s, comparatively "safe to touch" parts of his works (ethnographical, archeological, archeographical) were being explored and built upon by V.K. Bandarchyk, M.F. Pilipyenka, I.U. Chakvin, M.M. Ulashchyk, L.V. Alyaksyeyew). Historical part of his work remained visible as scarce references up to the mid-1980s. Attempts at estimating him as a historian were made in monographies of U.M. Mikhnyuk, Z.Yu. Kapyski, V.U. Chapko. In the 1990s, there appeared works researching the generalised scientific position of Dovnar-Zapol'skiy (S.I. Mikhal'chanka), the evolution of historical concept (Dz.U. Karaw, M.F. Shumyeyka).

John Leslie Howard Keep and Alter L. Litvin refer to both Dovnar-Zapol'ski and Picheta as "moderate (Belarusian) nationalists."

== Scientific works ==
=== History, economy and statistics of Belarus ===
- Sketch of history of lands of Krivichi and Dregovichi up to the end of 12th century, Kyiv, 1891.
- West Russian rural commune in 16th century, Saint-Petersburg, 1897.
- State economy of Great Duchy of Lithuania under Jagellons. Magister dissertation, Kyiv, 1901.
- Sketches on organisation of West Russian peasantry in 16th century. Doctor dissertation, Kyiv, 1906.
- History of Russian people's economy, Kyiv, 1911.
- History of Belarus, preliminary completion in 1919, expanded and printed in 1925, banned, re-published from incomplete manuscript in 1994 and 2005.
- Sketch on social-economical structure of Belarus in XVI—XVIII cent., Myensk, 1925.
- People's economy of Belarus in 1861–1914, Myensk, 1926.
- USSR by region. Western region (Belarusian SSR and Western part of RSFSR), Moscow—Leningrad, 1928.

=== Ethnography and folklore of Belarus ===
- Belarusian marriage and marriage songs, Kyiv, 1888.
- Belarusian marriage in cultural-religious survivals, Kyiv, 1893.
- Belarusian Polesie. Collection of ethnographical materials by M.V.Dovnar-Zapol'skiy. Songs of Pinchuki, Kyiv, 1895.
- Research and articles. Collection in 2 vol., Kyiv, 1909.

=== Political history of Rus' and Russia ===
- Political setup of Ancient Rus', Moscow, 1906.
- Political ideals of M. M. Speranskiy, Moscow, 1906.
- Emerging of Ministries in Russia, Moscow, 1906.
- From history of social movements in Russia. Articles, Kyiv, 1905.

=== Works on Decembrists movement ===
- Secret society of Decembrists, Moscow, 1906.
- Memoirs of Decembrists, Kyiv, 1906.
- Ideals of Decembrists, Moscow, 1907.

== Documental works ==
- Documents of Moscow archive of Ministry of Justice, Moscow, 1897.
- Barkulab Charter, 1897.
- Acts of the Lithuanian-Ruthenian State. Issue 1, 1390–1529, Moscow, 1898.
- Lithuanian Memorabilia to Tartar Hordes, Simferopol', 1898.
- Collection of materials on the history of people of Volyn voidvodship in 17–18-cent., 1914 (unpublished).
