= Nikolai Kulchitsky =

Nikolai Konstantinovich Kulchitsky
- Николай Константинович Кульчицкий
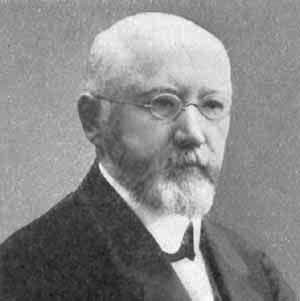
- Born: 16 January 1856; Kronstadt, Russian Empire
- Died: 30 January 1925 (aged 69); Oxford, England, Great Britain
- Education: Kharkiv Imperial University
- Awards: Order of Saint Vladimir; Order of Saint Anna; Order of Saint Stanislaus; Legion of Honour
- Scientific career
- Fields: Histology
- Workplaces: Kharkiv Imperial University; University of London

Nikolai Konstantinovich Kulchitsky (Russian: Николай Константинович Кульчицкий; 16 January 1856, Kronstadt – 30 January 1925, Oxford) was a Russian anatomist and histologist, the last Minister of Education of the Russian Empire.

== Early life and education ==
Born into an old untitled noble family of Polish origin, he was the second son of Konstantin Petrovich Kulchitsky (b. 1827), a naval officer, and his wife, Elizaveta Prokofyevna Pavlova, daughter of a Colonel in Russian Imperial army. In 1874–1879 he studied at the Medical Faculty of Kharkiv Imperial University. In 1882 he became a doctor of medicine.

== Career ==
In 1893 he became professor of histology at the university of Kharkiv, and was later appointed director of education in Kazan School District. In 1897 he described the endocrine cells of the small intestine which now bear his name (Kulchitsky cells).

In 1906 Kulchitsky was a member of council of Kharkiv branch of The Union of Russian People. In 1916 he was appointed Minister of Education of the Russian Empire, a post he held until the February Revolution. In 1918, he was arrested by the Bolsheviks, but was soon released, and then went to Kharkiv, then arrived at Sevastopol. In 1921 he emigrated to England. He worked in the Anatomy Department at University College London. He died in 1925 after an accidental fall in the University College.

He is known for discovering the Kulchitsky cells, which are named after him.

== Honours ==
=== National honours ===
- Russian Empire:
  - Order of Saint Vladimir, 3rd and 4th class
  - Order of Saint Anna, 2nd and 3rd class
  - Order of Saint Stanislaus, 1st, 2nd and 3rd class

=== Foreign honours ===
- France
  - Chevalier of the Legion of Honour

Preceded by Paul Ignatieff	Russian Minister of Education; 27 December 1916–28 February 1917	Succeeded by post abolished
