= Vladimir Titov (writer) =

Russian writer, statesman and diplomat

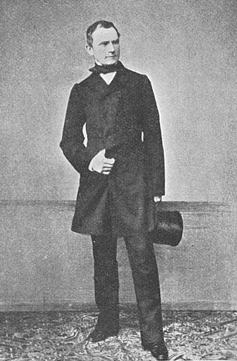
- Vladimir Titov, Russian envoy to Constantinople
- Born: Vladimir Pavlovich Titov; 12 March [O.S. 28 February] 1807; Noviki, now Spassky District, Russian Empire
- Died: 27 September [O.S. 15 September] 1891 (aged 84); Kharkov, Russian Empire

Vladimir Pavlovich Titov (Russian: Владимир Павлович Титов; 12 March [O.S. 28 February] 1807 — 27 September [O.S. 15 September] 1891), better known under the pseudonym Tit Kosmokratov (Russian: Тит Космократов), was a Russian writer, statesman, and diplomat. As a writer he is best known for the novella The Remote House on Vasilyevsky Island (Уединённый домик на Васильевском), which was influenced by the writings of Aleksandr Pushkin.

== Biography ==
Vladimir Titov was born on 12 March [O.S. 28 February] 1807 in the selo of Noviki, Spassky District, Ryazan Oblast.

He graduated from the Moscow University Noble Boarding School and the Moscow State University and trained with well-known writers Vladimir Odoevsky and Stepan Shevyryov. From 1823 to 1828 he served at the chancery of the Ministry of Foreign Affairs, then in the Asian department.

In his youth he was active in literature. With Odoevsky, Shevyryov, Dmitry Venevitinov and others he participated at the philosophical circle Lyubomudry, which existed from 1823 to 1825. He knew Pushkin, Pyotr Vyazemsky, Vasily Zhukovsky and many more of the leading writers. His fantastic novella The Remote House on Vasilyevsky Island was published in the almanac The Northern Flowers of 1829 (Северные цветы на 1829). As Tit Kosmokratov he also wrote The Monastery of St. Brigit (Монастырь св. Бригиты), issued in the almanac The Northern Flowers of 1829. Also, Titov is the author of the three-volume novel about the Russo-Turkish War from 1828 to 1829, Wrongly Stories of Cicerone del K...o (Неправдоподобные рассказы чичероне дель К…о) (1837).

Titov later served as General-Councilor of the Danubian Principalities, and was an envoy to Constantinople and Stuttgart. From 1873 he commissioned the Archaeographic Commission. He died on 27 September [O.S. 15 September] 1891, in Kharkov.
