= Pavel Stroyev =

Russian historian (1796–1876)

Pavel Mikhailovich Stroyev (Павел Михайлович Строев; 1796–1876) was a Russian paleographer who brought to light some of the most important sources of Russian history, including the Sudebnik of 1497, the homilies of St. Cyril of Turov, the Slavic text of George Hamartolus, and Svyatoslav's Miscellanies of 1073. He worked under the auspices of Count Nikolai Rumyantsev hand in hand with Konstantin Kalaidovich until the latter went insane in 1825.

In 1817 and 1818 Stroev and Kalaidovich wandered from monastery to monastery around Moscow in search of ancient manuscripts. They published several texts of international treaties and other historical documents from the Moscow archive in 1819–21. Seven years later Stroyev launched the first of his "archaeographic expeditions" that led him through no less than 14 provinces in 1829-34 and resulted in the publication of more than 3000 historical documents.

He was named a corresponding member of the Petersburg Academy of Sciences in 1826 and a full member in 1849. After the Tsar bought the immense manuscript collection of Count Fyodor Andreyevich Tolstoy in 1830, it was Stroyev who prepared it for publication.
