= Dmitry Sontsov =

Russian numismatist

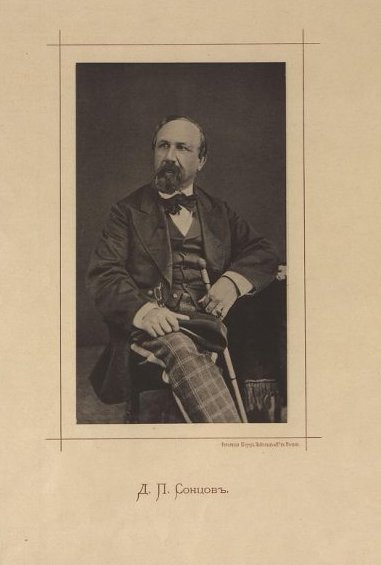
Image of Dmitry Sontsov

Dmitri Petrovich Sontsov (Дмитрий Петрович Сонцов; 1803 – 1875) was one of the first Russian numismatists.

Sontsov's father Peter was the Governor of Voronezh, and his maternal uncle Alexander Chertkov owned one of Moscow's finest libraries. He attended the Page Corps before serving as an aide-de-camp to Prince Paskevich in his campaigns in Poland and Hungary.

Sontsov's numismatic collection was bequeathed to the Rumyantsev Museum. It is known to have contained some crude forgeries. His magnum opus is the 1860 compilation Money of Old Rus, with 123 illustrations.

Sontsov lived separately from his wife Varvara, the daughter of Prince Pavel Gagarin, Chairman of the Imperial Committee of Ministers.
