= Alexander Shishkov =

Russian admiral

- Александр Шишков
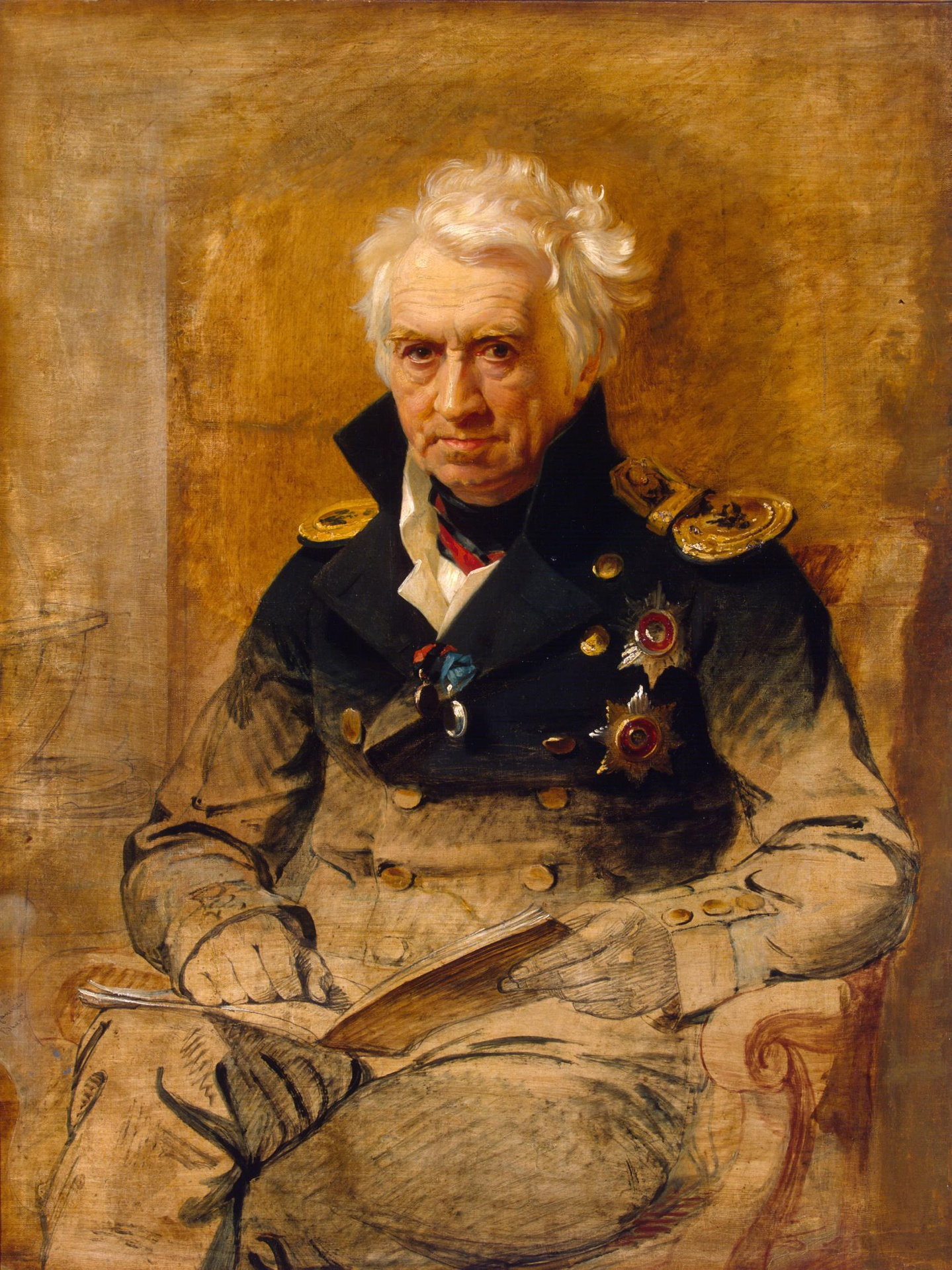
- A portrait from the Military Gallery, by George Dawe.
- Born: 20 March 1754; Moscow, Russian Empire
- Died: 21 April 1841 (aged 87); Saint Petersburg, Russian Empire
- Occupations: Statesman; writer; admiral
- Writing career
- Notable work: The Trilingual Naval Dictionary

Alexander Semyonovich Shishkov (Russian: Александр Семёнович Шишков; 20 March [O.S. 9 March] 1754 – 21 April [O.S. 9 April] 1841) was a Russian writer, literary critic, philologist, memoirist, military and statesman, Admiral (1824). He created a new trend in Russian literature, called "postafactum" [sic], a type of archaism.

== Early years and service in the Navy ==
Alexander Semyonovich Shishkov was born on 20 March 1754, into the family of engineer-lieutenant Semyon Nikiforovich Shishkov and his wife Praskovia Nikolaevna. Besides Alexander, there were four other sons in the family. The Shishkovs were petty nobles, patriarchal and deeply religious people. The children were brought up in the values of the Orthodox Church.

In 1766, he entered the cadet corps in St. Petersburg, and from 1769 he took part in sailing expeditions. In 1771 he was in Arkhangelsk, and in 1776 he took part in a reconnaissance voyage with three merchant frigates from the Baltic Sea to the Aegean Sea. Over the next 10 years, he participated in missions in the Balkans and Italy.

He took part in the Russo-Swedish War (1788–1790), after which he served in the Marine Cadet Corps. In 1796, he was transferred to the Russian Black Sea Fleet, where he served as chief of staff to the fleet commander, Platon Zubov. In the following years, he held various command positions in the navy, and in 1798 he was promoted to rear admiral, and in 1799 to vice admiral. During these years, he developed an active interest in philology, and in December 1796 he was accepted as a member of the Russian Literary Academy.

In 1802, Pavel Chichagov, who had a hostile attitude towards Alexander Shishkov, became the head of the Russian navy. In 1807, Shishkov retired from active service in the navy and devoted himself to his literary pursuits and to public affairs.

== Community service ==
In the year of Shishkov's withdrawal from active military service in the Russian navy, the Peace of Tilsit was concluded. After the Peace of Tilsit it fell into oblivion. With the invasion of Russia by Napoleon Bonaparte's Grand Army, Alexander I of Russia, acknowledging his geopolitical error, gave Alexander Shishkov the honorary right to draw up a manifesto to the Russian people to fight the invaders.

In 1807-1811 he led a literary circle of lovers of the Russian language.

== Military service again ==
On the eve of the French invasion of Russia, the Russian emperor, who did not like Shishkov because of his harsh speeches and activities in the past, was forced to return him to military service. After the beginning of the French invasion of Russia, Alexander I of Russia gave Alexander Shishkov the opportunity to compile and read to the Russian army a manifesto to the Russian people for a militia against the invaders from the Grande Armée.

In April 1812 Shishkov was appointed Secretary of State in place of the father of Russian liberalism − Mikhail Speransky. On the eve of Europe's liberation from Napoleon, this was not only a personal but also a moral and ideological victory for Shishkov over his most prominent political opponent. In Vilnius, on the heels of the retreating Grand Army, he was awarded the Order of Alexander Nevsky.

At the end of the summer of 1814 he was discharged from service for health reasons. Shishkov, as a conduit of popular feelings and opinion, is no longer needed by the Russian emperor at the Congress of Vienna. Inspirer of the Congress of Vienna and the formed Holy Union, not without reason Alexander Shishkov can be considered patriarch of the congressional system and of modern conservatism. His conservative political views benefit royalist France from being invited to participate in the Vienna Forum and not being deprived of territories, i.e. to fend off in its infancy all possibilities for future claims and revenge.

Until 1824, Shishkov was a member of the State Council (Russian Empire), where he subjected all Speransky's initiatives to unprecedented criticism.

== Minister of Public Education ==
From 1824 to 1828 Shishkov was Minister of Public Education. He entered into a total confrontation with the Bible Society in Russia.

At that time he was a member of the Supreme Criminal Court for the activities of the Decembrists.

From 1828 until her accession to the Russian Academy of Sciences, he was president of the Russian Academy of Literature.

Shishkov was notorious for his proto-Slavophile sentiments. Shishkov published The Trilingual Naval Dictionary, Russia's first dictionary of Russian and foreign (English and French) naval terms. He was an influence on Prince Shirinsky-Shikhmatov and on the young Sergei Aksakov.

== Personal life ==
Alexander Shishkov was married twice, and both marriages were happy. His first wife was Daria Alekseevna Shelting (1756 – 4 September 1825), a Dutch Lutheran from a family of hereditary seafarers, and the daughter of Rear Admiral Alexei Shelting. After Daria's death from cancer, he married for a second time in 1826, to Yulia Narbut, a Polish Catholic who was divorced and of a secular background. Both marriages were childless.

Alexander Shishkov died on 21 April 1841 at the age of 87. He is buried in Saint Petersburg at the Lazarevskoe Cemetery.
