= Platon Shirinsky-Shikhmatov =

Russian poet (1790–1853)

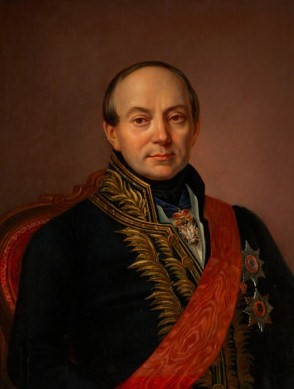
Prince Shirinsky in 1840

Prince Platon Alexandrovich Shirinsky-Shikhmatov (Russian: Платон Александрович Ширинский-Шихматов; 1790–1853) was Nicholas I's deputy education minister (1842–50) and education minister (1850–53) who spearheaded the Orthodoxy, Autocracy, and Nationality policy introduced by his predecessor Sergey Uvarov. He was also an amateur poet and translator.

Shirinsky-Shikhmatov came from a Tatar princely family that could trace its lineage to Genghis Khan. He served with distinction in the Russian Navy during the Napoleonic Wars. As a protégé of admiral Alexander Shishkov he followed his mentor from the navy to the ministry of education. Boasting that he was but "a blind tool of his emperor's will", he sought to increase the number of university students who were of noble origin at the expense of commoners. He believed that it was the nobility's duty to rule Russia.

Shirinsky-Shikhmatov's most durable achievement was the Archaeographic Commission set up in 1834 to oversee the publication of medieval archives and chronicles. It continues under a different name to this day.
