= Saint Petersburg Institute of History =

Russian research institute

Saint Petersburg Institute of History of the Russian Academy of Sciences
- Established: 1936; 90 years ago
- Focus: History and auxiliary sciences of history
- President: Prof.dr. A. V. Sirenov
- Members: 76 researchers
- Owner: Russian Academy of Sciences
- Formerly called: Leningrad branch of the Institute of History of the USSR Academy of Sciences
- Location: Petrozavodskaya st., 7, Saint Petersburg 197110, Russian Federation
- Coordinates: 59.96351°N 30.29183°E
- Interactive map of Saint Petersburg Institute of History of the Russian Academy of Sciences
- Website: spbiiran.ru/en/

The Saint Petersburg Institute of History (Russian: Санкт-Петербургский Институт истории) is a research institute of the Russian Academy of Sciences in the field of Russian and foreign history. It is part of the Department of Historical and Philological Sciences of the Russian Academy of Sciences. The organization is located in the estate of N. P. Likhachyov in Saint Petersburg, where he lived from 1902 to 1936, so the institute is also known as the "Likhachyov Mansion". As a research center, the institute continues the traditions of the St. Petersburg historical school, established by K. Bestuzhev-Ryumin, S. Platonov, A. Lappo-Danilevsky, A. Presnyakov and others.

Since 1936, the organization operated as the Leningrad branch of the Institute of History, Academy of Sciences of the Soviet Union. After the proclamation of independence of the Russian Federation, the organization began to exist as a branch of the Russian Academy of Sciences, and since 2000 has had its current name. At different times, such historians as B. Grekov, S. Zhebelev, V. Struve, Y. Tarle, I. Shaskol'skii, S. Kovalev, A. Lublinskaya, I. Petrushevsky, M. Sergeyenko worked at the institute. At present, the institute's staff conducts research in the following areas: classical studies, Byzantine studies, medieval history of Italian cities, American studies, history of the socio-political movements in Russia in the 19th century, history of feudalism in Russia, history of St. Petersburg, history of the Russian Revolution, history of the Siege of Leningrad.

The Institute has an archive that stores documents of the Archaeographic Commission, as well as documents from the collection of N. P. Likhachyov and other private collectors. In total, the archive contains over 188 thousand storage units. The documents concern the history of Russia (13th — 20th centuries) and Europe (7th — 20th centuries). Among the documents are:

- acts of Italian and German cities, papal bulls, documents of European monarchs;
- monastery funds (archives of Solovetsky, Alexander-Svirsky, Siya, Valday, Tikhvin and other monasteries of North-West Russia);
- family funds (archives of Vorontsov, Demidov, Tatishchev, Stroganov, Shuvalov and others Russian noble families).
