= Ministry of National Education (Russian Empire) =

Government ministry (1802–1817; 1824–1917)

- Министерство народного просвещения Российской империи
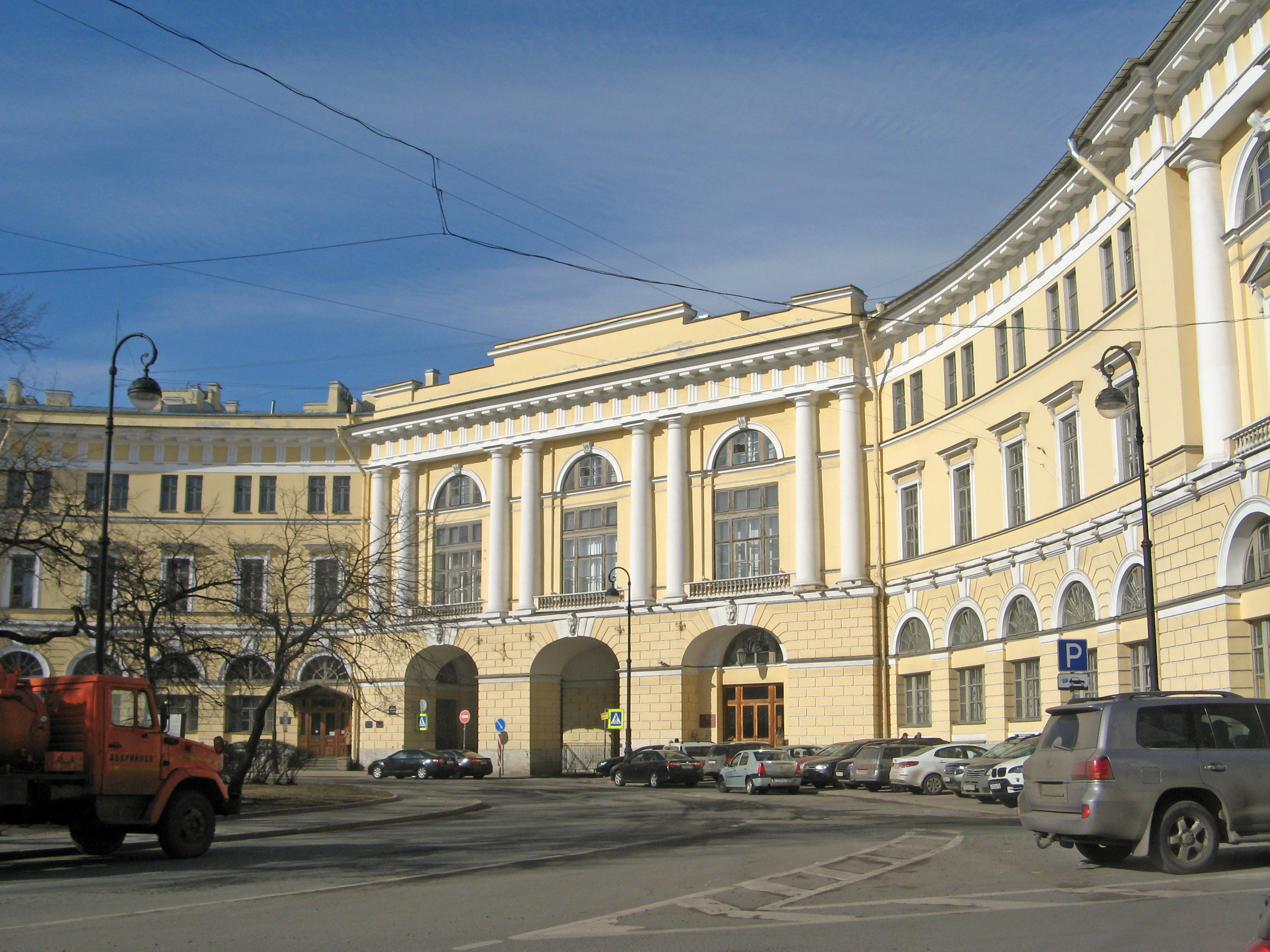
- Ministry headquarters in Saint Petersburg

Agency overview
- Formed: 1824
- Dissolved: 1917
- Superseding agency: People's Commissariat for Education
- Headquarters: Saint Petersburg, Russian Empire
- Parent department: Council of Ministers of the Russian Empire

The Ministry of National Education (Russian: Министерство народного просвещения Российской империи), also translated as Ministry of National Enlightenment, was a government ministry in the Russian Empire which oversaw science and education. It was in existence from 1802 to 1817 and from 1824 to 1917. From 1817 to 1824, it was part of the Ministry of Religious Affairs and Public Education.

== History ==
The first institution for managing education in the Russian Empire was the Commission for the Establishment of Public Schools, formed in 1782 and twenty years later becoming part of the Ministry of Public Education, established by the manifesto of Emperor Alexander I of September 8 (20), 1802, "On the Establishment of Ministries” for the purpose of “educating youth and disseminating science".

In 1863, the Ministry of Public Education was reorganized, formalized by the "Establishment of the Ministry of Public Education" adopted on June 18 (30), 1863. According to it, the ministry's central apparatus consisted of the Council of Ministers, the Department of Public Education, and the Academic Committee.

The ministry's jurisdiction included the Imperial St. Petersburg Academy of Sciences, the Nikolaev Main Observatory, the Imperial Public Library, and the Rumyantsev Museum.

During the government reforms of Alexander II, the Ministry of Public Education prepared the University Charter of 1863, and the Gymnasium Charter of November 19 (December 1), 1864, which were distinguished by a liberal orientation. Somewhat later, the Charter of Schools was also prepared on May 15 (27), 1872. These regulatory documents created a new legislative framework for the activities of educational institutions. To improve the management of educational institutions, in 1864 the Ministry established provincial and district school councils, and in 1869 the positions of inspectors of public schools were created.

In 1874 and 1875, the newspapers Sankt-Peterburgskie Vedomosti and "St. Petersburger Zeitung," previously academic publications, became the Ministry of Public Education's departmental publications.

In 1881, the majority of educational institutions under the Ministry of Finance were transferred to the Ministry of Public Education, as well as a number of educational institutions in Finland, Transcaucasia, and elsewhere.

In the 1880s, state policy in higher education was adjusted toward stricter oversight, which was reflected in the new University Charter of August 23 (September 4), 1884.

On May 31 (June 13), 1904, the Ministry of Public Education underwent another reorganization. Its central institutions now included the Minister's Council, the Department of Public Education, the Department of General Affairs, the Academic Committee, as well as the Administration of Pension Funds for Public Teachers, the Legal Advisory Section, the Standing Commission for Public Readings, and other institutions.

The rapid growth in the number of educational institutions required the ministry to be proactive. A number of reformist steps were taken under Count Paul Ignatieff's ministry. To address the management of the higher education system, in March 1916, the MPE established a Council for Higher Education Institutions and an interdepartmental Council for Vocational Education.

In October 1917, the Ministry of National Education ceased to exist, its functions being transferred to the People's Commissariat for Education of the RSFSR.

== Ministers ==
- List of national education ministers of Russia

== See also ==
- Ministry of Education (Russia)
- Ministry of Education (Soviet Union)
