= Aleksey Uvarov =

Russian archaeologist

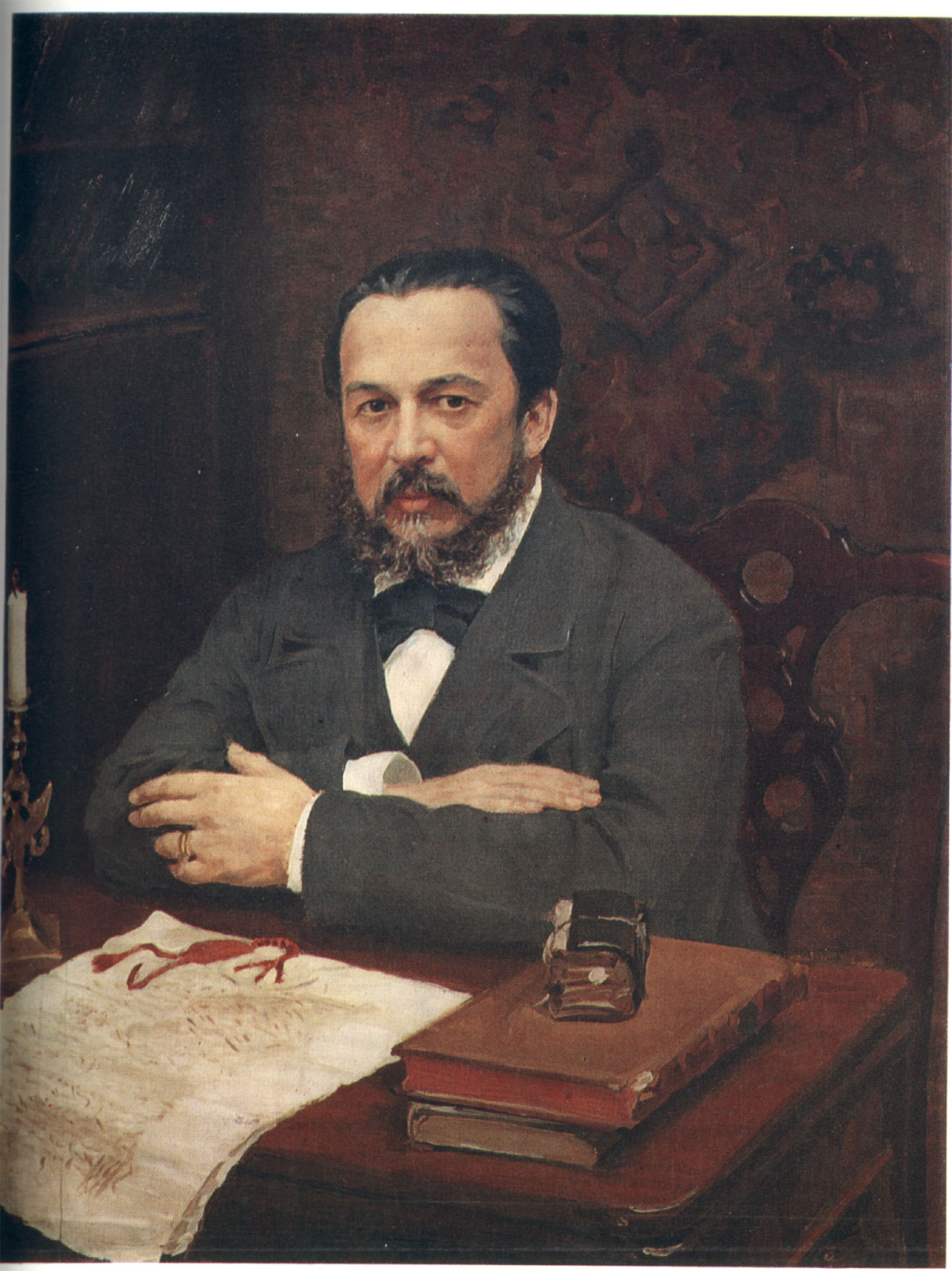
Aleksey Uvarov; posthumous portrait by Ivan Kulikov

Count Aleksey Sergeyevich Uvarov (Russian: Алексе́й Серге́евич Ува́ров; 28 February 1825 – 29 December 1884) was a Russian archaeologist often considered to be the founder of the study of the prehistory of Russia.

== Biography ==
Uvarov was the son of Count Sergey Uvarov, an influential minister of education. He came to know the leading historians of the period, Mikhail Pogodin and Timofey Granovsky, from an early age. He was educated at the universities of St. Petersburg, Berlin, and Heidelberg. After his father's death, he commemorated his name by instituting (in 1857) the Uvarov Prize, to be awarded by the Academy of Sciences to distinguished writers and historians.

Uvarov's activities as a field archaeologist began with visits to Rostov, Vladimir, Chernigov and other centres of Kievan Rus. Starting in 1854, he excavated the Meryan-Norse settlement at Sarskoe Gorodishche. He summarized his findings in The Meryans and Their Lifestyle as Shown by Kurgan Excavations. Subsequent expeditions took him to Pontic Olbia, Tauric Chersonesus, and Scythian Neapolis.

Uvarov was a towering presence in the history of the Imperial Russian Archaeological Society. In 1864 he helped organize the Moscow Archaeological Society, of which he remained president until his death. During Uvarov's administration, the society would convene one time in three years at some ancient Russian town. More importantly in the long run, Uvarov contributed to the establishment of the State Historical Museum, with the intention of promoting national self-awareness.

Although his judgment was not always accurate and his methods of research may appear amateurish to a modern observer, Uvarov's work greatly advanced knowledge of pre-Slavic cultures inhabiting the European part of the Russian Empire. Two volumes of Russian Archaeology in the Prehistoric Period contain his delineation of Eastern European prehistory.
