= Pyotr Papkov =

Pyotr Afanasievich Papkov (Russian: Папков, Петр Афанасьевич, 1772–1853) was a Russian Generalmajor and statesman.

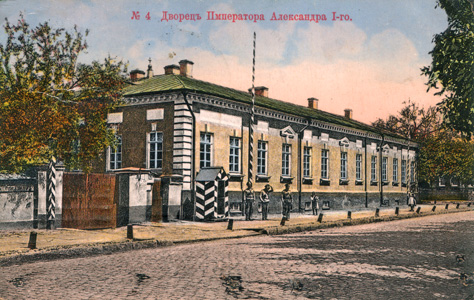
Alexander I Palace in Taganrog, official apartment of Papkov in 1816-1822.

== Military career ==
Pyotr Afanasievich was born in 1772 into a Russian noble family of Papkovs in Yekaterinoslav Governorate. On 1 January 1784, he enrolled into the Taganrog dragoon regiment as cavalry sergeant-major (вахмистр). In 1787, Papkov was moved to Astrakhan dragoon regiment in the rank of cadet, and in 1790 into Tiflis musketeer regiment in the rank of aide-de-camp. During Russo-Turkish War, 1787-1792, Papkov's regiment participated in an assault on Anapa under command of General-en-chef Ivan Gudovich.

For Anapa, Pyotr Papkov was promoted to the rank of sub-poruchik. Beginning 28 April 1796, Papkov was in Persia, and participated in the Persian Expedition of 1796, taking part in the siege of Derbent and other key operations of the campaign. For the Persian Expedition he was promoted to the rank of poruchik and a year later into the rank of captain.

He gave his resignation in 1798, but enrolled again in April 1799 into the artillery battalion of Leib Guards. Paul I of Russia decorated Papkov with an Order of St John of Jerusalem (орден Св. Иоанна Иерусалимского) on 3 August 1800, and was promoted to the rank of colonel on 8 October 1800. In 1803, he commanded the pontoon artillery companies, later pontoon artillery regiment.

In 1806, Papkov served as brigadier-commander of the 14th artillery brigade, with which he participated in the Battle of Gutstadt, Battle of Heilsberg and Battle of Friedland, was decorated with a Prussian order For Merits, and, on 21 December 1807, resigned from military service in the rank of mayor-general.

== Governor of Taganrog ==
In 1808, he was appointed Chief Police Officer (Oberpolizeimeister) of Saint Petersburg and was awarded with an Order of St. George of 3rd degree on 21 April 2 1808.

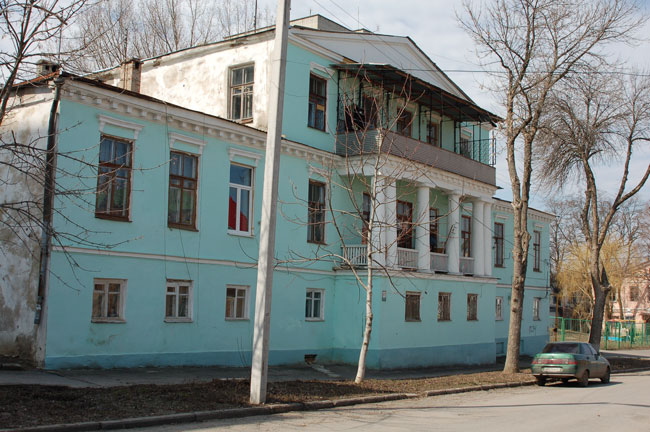
One of Papkov's three mansions in Taganrog.© TaganrogCity.Com

In 1810, Papkov was appointed Governor of Taganrog. The Taganrog Governorate at that moment comprised the cities of Rostov on Don, Nakhichevan and Mariupol. He was also appointed the chief administrator (главный попечитель) of the merchant vessels' navigation in the Azov Sea, and head of the Taganrog Customs district. The governorship of Papkov was at the time of the highest rivalry between the two main seaports in the South of Russia - Odessa and Taganrog.

In 1812, plague epidemic started along the Black Sea shore, the ports of Odessa and Feodosiya. Governor Papkov banned all ships from entering into the Azov Sea through the Strait of Kerch, and saved the city from pestilence. Odessa's lobbyists tried to revenge and persuaded the tsar to keep the Azov Sea closed even after the epidemic was over.

In 1815, the prices for wheat went up abroad, the price for wheat in Odessa was 50 rubles for a quarter (=209.91 liters), while in Taganrog it was 18. Foreign ships could not get enough wheat in Odessa and Feodosiya due to a large shortage, and this encouraged Governor Pyotr Papkov to let the ships go through the Kerch Straight into Azov Sea. Over 600 ships came to the seaport of Taganrog, and the price went up to 45 rubles/a quarter. The boom continued the following years, with a tacit approval of Alexander I of Russia who was favorably disposed towards Taganrog. The city grew feverishly and draw attention of the imperial family. It was visited in 1816 by Nikolay Pavlovich, in 1817 by Mikhail Pavlovich and, in May 1818, by Alexander I of Russia. With that in mind, all uezd's establishments were transferred to Taganrog in 1816 (until 1834).

Papkov left the governor's office in 1822 and served with the military until 3 February 1833. After his resignation he settled in his estate, village Krasniy Kut of Yekaterinoslav Governorate, where he died on 18 May 1853. To honor the achievements of Governor Pyotr Papkov, the Taganrog City Council placed his portrait in its hall in 1866.

In 1833, Papkov was elected member of the Main Moscow Society for improvement of the sheep-breeding (Главное Московское Общество улучшения овцеводства) and into its periodical The Sheep-breeding Journal, where he published the following articles: On the Flock of Fine-wool Sheep (1833), On Angora goats (1833), On Sales of Angora goats (1839) and statistics on sheep-breeding in the same journal in 1844.

- old dates mentioned are Old Style.

== External links and references ==
- History of Taganrog
- History of Taganrog by Pavel Filevskiy, Moscow, 1898

Government offices
Preceded by Balthasar von Campenhausen	Governors of Taganrog; 1810–1822	Succeeded by Nikolai Naumov
