= Alexander I Palace =

Building in Taganrog, Rostov Oblast, Russia

Coordinates: 47.20929°N 38.94156°E

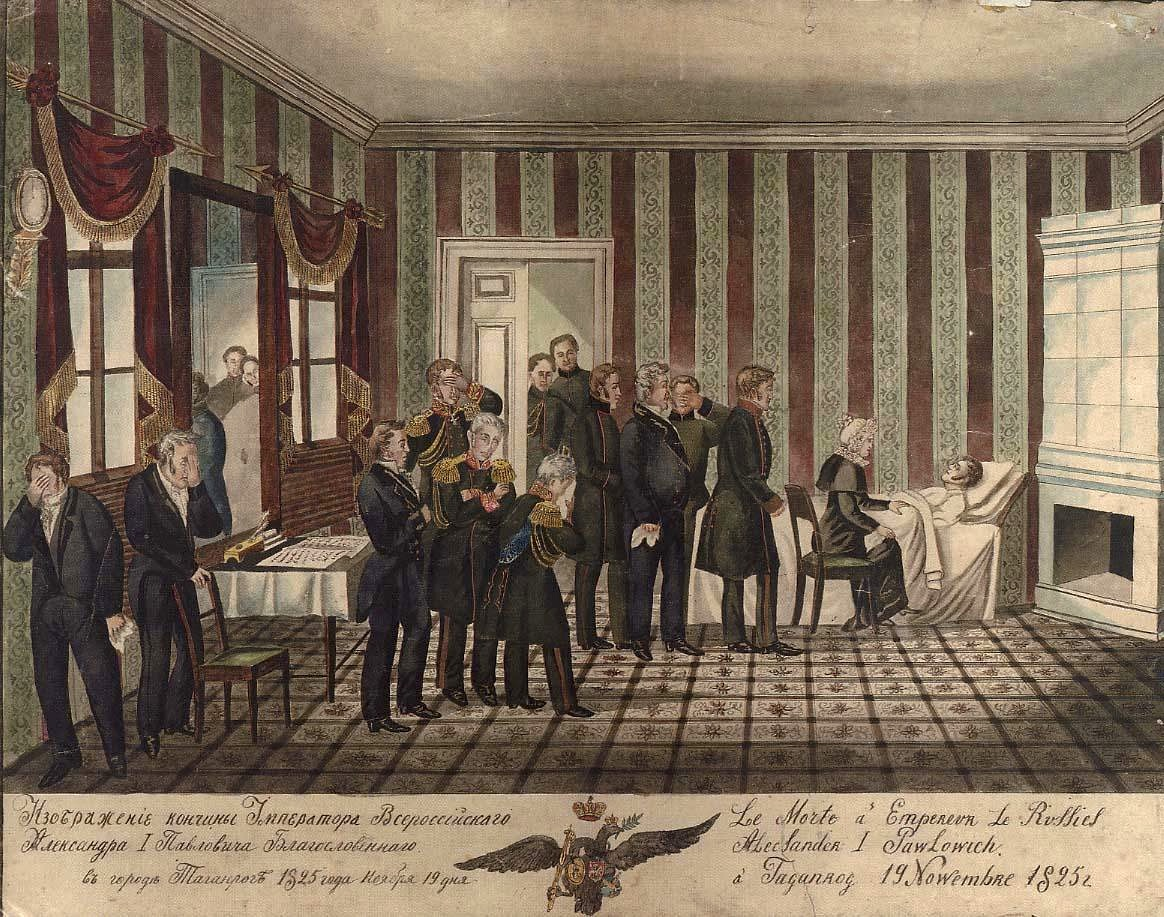
- Established: 1826
- Dissolved: 1928
- Location: Ulitsa Grecheskaya 40, Taganrog
- Visitors: 0
- Public transit access: Shuttle buses 2, 30, 60, 73

Alexander I Palace in Taganrog is a one-story stone building in Russian classicism style on Grecheskaya Street, 40 where Russian emperor Alexander I died in 1825.

The mansion was built in 1806 and belonged to different owners. The most significant of them was the Governor of Taganrog Pyotr Papkov. Emperor Alexander I of Russia stayed there twice – in 1818 and 1825. After his death the building was bought by his widow empress consort Elizabeth Alexeievna (Louise of Baden) and the first memorial museum in Russia dedicated to the Emperor was established there. Among the visitors to the palace of Alexander I were the Russian emperors Alexander II of Russia and Alexander III, poets Alexander Pushkin and Vasily Zhukovsky, artist Ivan Aivazovsky, People’s commissar of enlightenment Anatoly Lunacharsky, and many others.

For 12 years beginning in 1864 an amateur choir conducted by Pavel Chekhov (Anton Chekhov's father) sang in the Church of Exaltation of the Cross, which was established within the mansion to honor the emperor. At the end of 1860s – beginning of 1870s Alexander, Nicolas and Anton Chekhov sang there in choral parts of descant and alto. In 1928 the memorial museum was closed and some of the exhibits were moved into the Alferaki Palace.

The building of the Palace of Alexander I houses a children’s sanatorium called “Beryozka”.

== Gallery ==
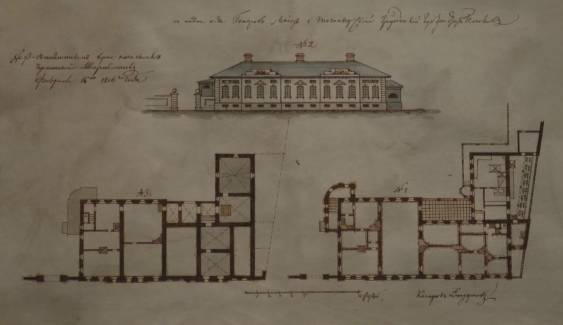
Photograph of the original plan of the Pyotr Papkov's mansion in Taganrog, collection of the Taganrog City Architectural Development Museum

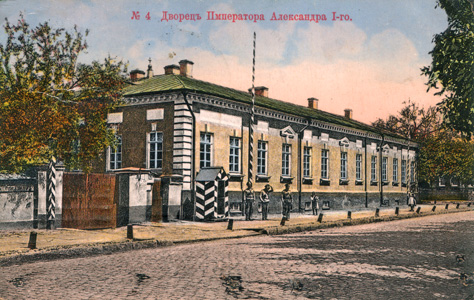
Alexander I Palace on an old postcard, late 19th century

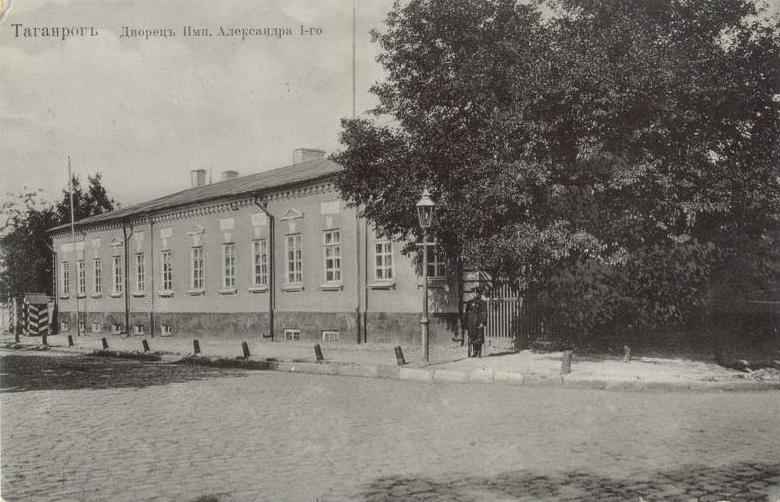

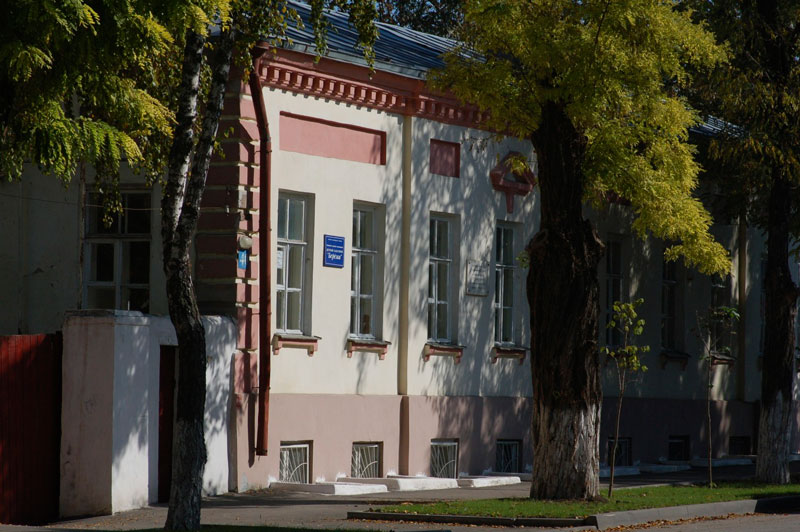
The Alexander I Palace, now "Beryozka" sanatorium, in 2008

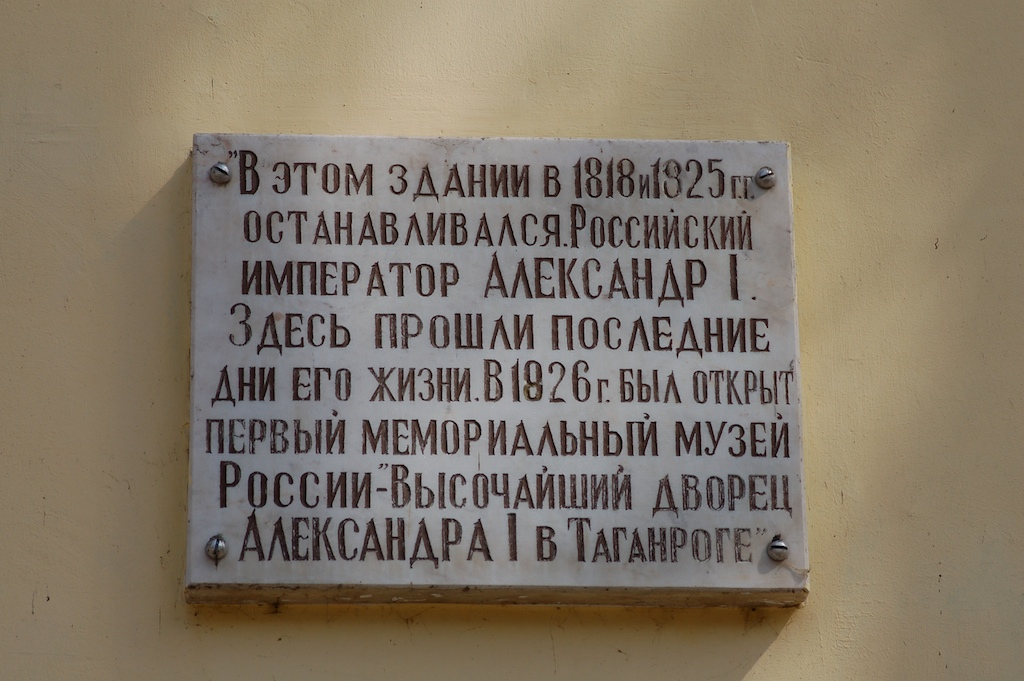
Memorial plaque on Alexander I's mansion in Taganrog. The inscription reads: In this mansion in 1818 and in 1825 stayed Russian emperor Alexander I. Here he spent his last days. In 1826 was inaugurated the first memorial museum in Russia: "The supreme palace of Alexander I in Taganrog."

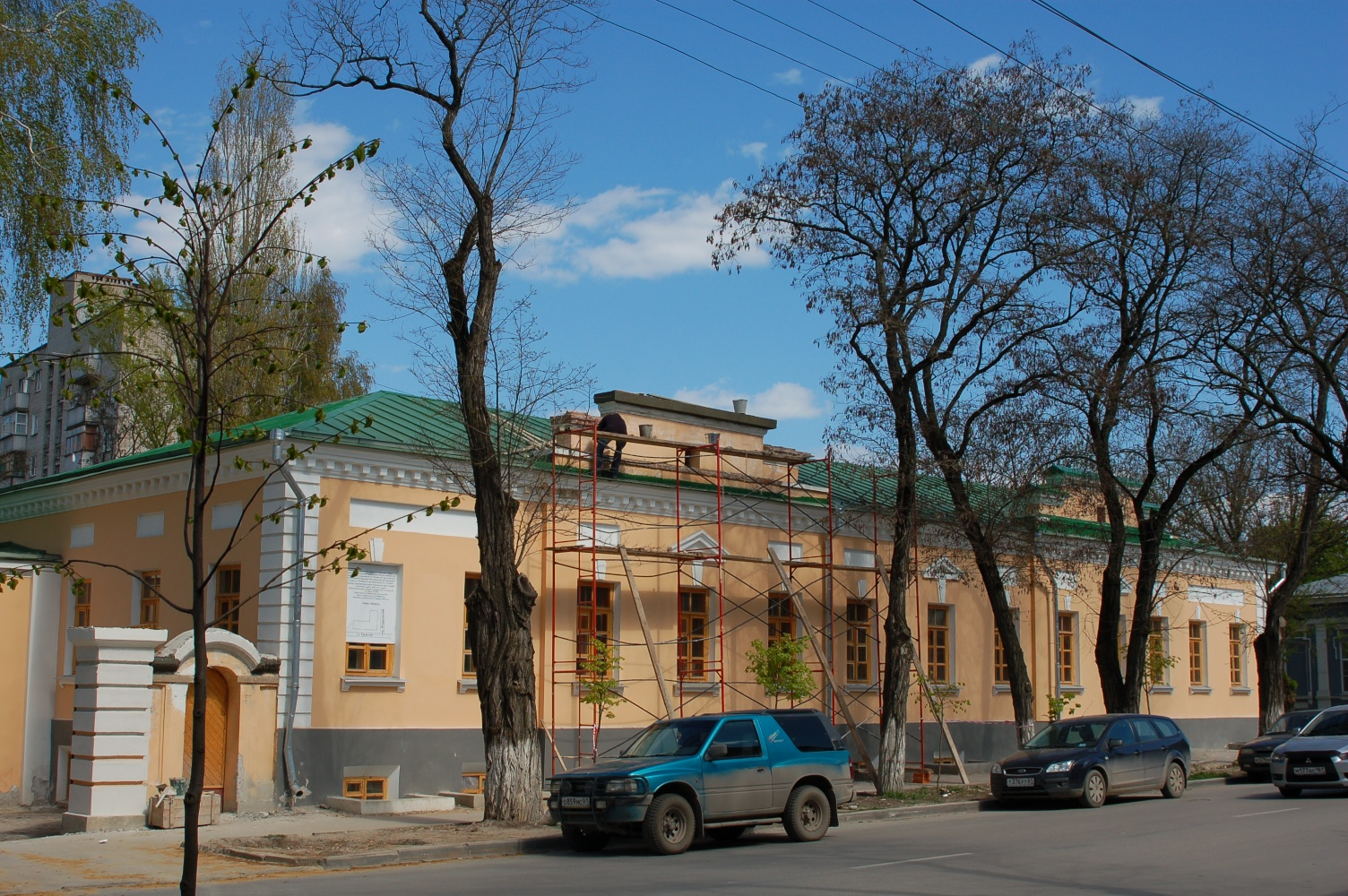
The former Alexander Palace in the process of renovation in April 2010
