= Alexander I of Russia =

Emperor of Russia from 1801 to 1825

Alexander I
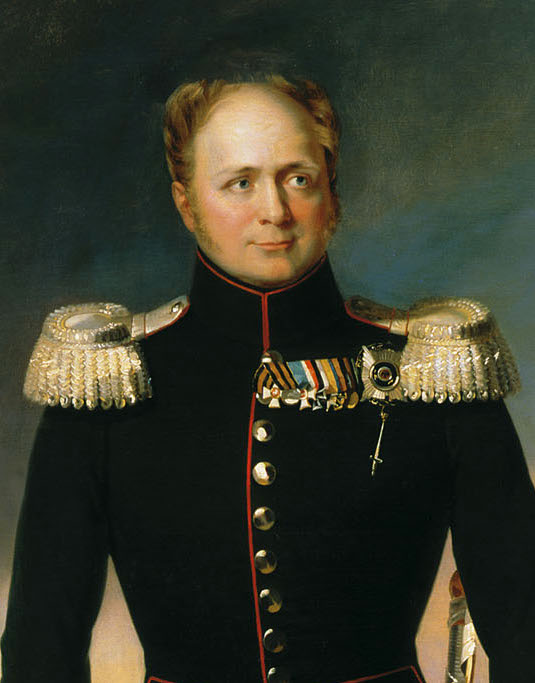
- Portrait by George Dawe, c. 1825–29

Emperor of Russia
- Reign: 23 March 1801 – 1 December 1825
- Coronation: 15 September 1801
- Predecessor: Paul I
- Successor: Nicholas I

King of Poland
- Reign: 9 June 1815 – 1 December 1825
- Predecessor: Frederick Augustus I of Saxony (as Duke of Warsaw); Stanisław II of Poland (In 1795)
- Successor: Nicholas I of Russia

Grand Duke of Finland
- Reign: 1809-1825
- Successor: Nicholas I
- Born: 23 December 1777; Winter Palace, Saint Petersburg, Russia
- Died: 1 December 1825 (aged 47); Alexander I Palace, Taganrog, Russia
- Burial: 13 March 1826; Saints Peter and Paul Cathedral, Saint Petersburg
- Spouse: Louise of Baden (m. 1793)
- Issue more...: Grand Duchess Maria; Grand Duchess Elizabeth
Names
- Alexander Pavlovich Romanov
- House: Holstein-Gottorp-Romanov
- Father: Paul I of Russia
- Mother: Sophie Dorothea of Württemberg

Military service
- Branch/service: Imperial Russian Army
- Battles/wars: See list: Russo-Persian War (1804–1813); War of the Third Coalition; Battle of Austerlitz; War of the Fourth Coalition; Russo-Turkish War (1806–1812); Anglo-Russian War; Finnish War; French invasion of Russia; War of the Sixth Coalition; Battle of Lützen; Battle of Bautzen; Battle of Dresden; Battle of Leipzig; Battle of Arcis-sur-Aube; Battle of Fère-Champenoise; Battle of Paris; War of the Seventh Coalition

Alexander I of Russia (Russian: Александр I Павлович, romanized: Aleksandr I Pavlovich, IPA: [ɐlʲɪkˈsandr ˈpavləvʲɪtɕ]; 23 December [O.S. 12 December] 1777 – 1 December [O.S. 19 November] 1825), (Note: During Alexander's lifetime Russia used the Julian calendar (Old Style), but unless otherwise stated, any date in this article uses the Gregorian Calendar (New Style) — see the article "Old Style and New Style dates" for a more detailed explanation.) nicknamed "the Blessed", (Note: Russian: Благословенный, romanized: Blagoslovenny) was Emperor of Russia from 1801, the first King of Congress Poland from 1815, and the Grand Duke of Finland from 1809 to his death in 1825. He ruled Russia during the period of the Napoleonic Wars.

The eldest son of Paul I of Russia and Sophie Dorothea of Württemberg, Alexander succeeded to the throne after his father was murdered. As prince and during the early years of his reign, he often used liberal rhetoric but continued Russia's absolutist policies in practice. In the first years of his reign, he initiated some minor social reforms and (in 1803–1804) major liberal educational reforms, such as building more universities. Alexander appointed Mikhail Speransky, the son of a village priest, as one of his closest advisors. The over-centralised Collegium ministries were abolished and replaced by the Committee of Ministers, State Council, and the Supreme Court to improve the legal system. Plans were made, but never consummated, to set up a parliament and sign a constitution. In contrast to his westernising predecessors, such as Peter the Great, Alexander was a Russian nationalist and Slavophile who wanted Russia to develop on the basis of Russian rather than European culture.

In foreign policy, he changed Russia's position towards France four times between 1804 and 1812, shifting among neutrality, opposition, and alliance. In 1805 he joined Britain in the War of the Third Coalition against Napoleon, but after suffering massive defeats at the battles of Austerlitz and Friedland, he switched sides and formed an alliance with Napoleon in the Treaty of Tilsit (1807) and joined Napoleon's Continental System. He fought a small-scale naval war against Britain between 1807 and 1812 and took Finland from Sweden in 1809 after Sweden's refusal to join the Continental System. Alexander and Napoleon hardly agreed, especially regarding Poland, and the alliance collapsed by 1810. Alexander's greatest triumph came in 1812 when Napoleon's invasion of Russia descended into a catastrophe for the French. As part of the winning coalition against Napoleon, he gained territory in Poland. He formed the Holy Alliance to suppress the revolutionary movements in Europe, which he saw as immoral threats to legitimate Christian monarchs.

During the second half of his reign, Alexander became increasingly arbitrary, reactionary, and fearful of plots against him; as a result, he ended many of the reforms he had made earlier in his reign. He purged schools of foreign teachers, as education became more religiously driven as well as politically conservative. Speransky was replaced as advisor with the strict artillery inspector Aleksey Arakcheyev, who oversaw the creation of military settlements. Alexander died of typhus in December 1825 while on a trip to southern Russia. He left no legitimate children, as his two daughters died in childhood. Neither of his brothers wanted to become emperor. After a period of great confusion (that presaged the failed Decembrist revolt of liberal army officers in the weeks after his death), he was succeeded by his younger brother, Nicholas I of Russia.

== Early life ==
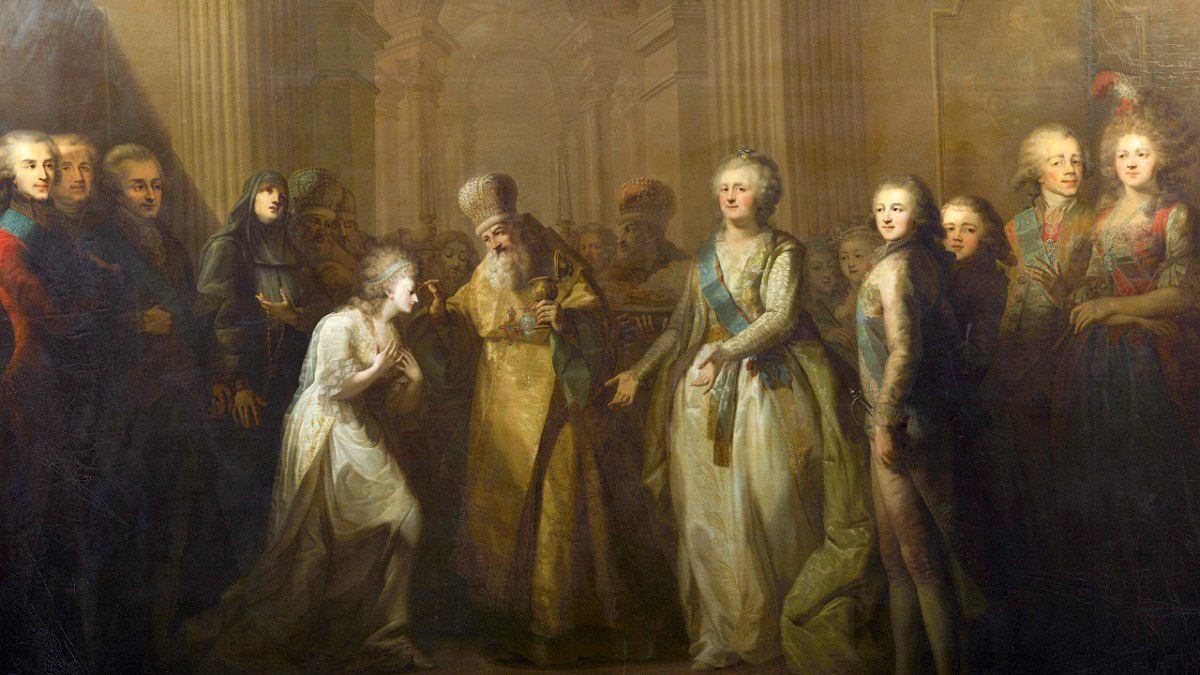
Confirmation of Alexander's wife Elizabeth Alexeievna

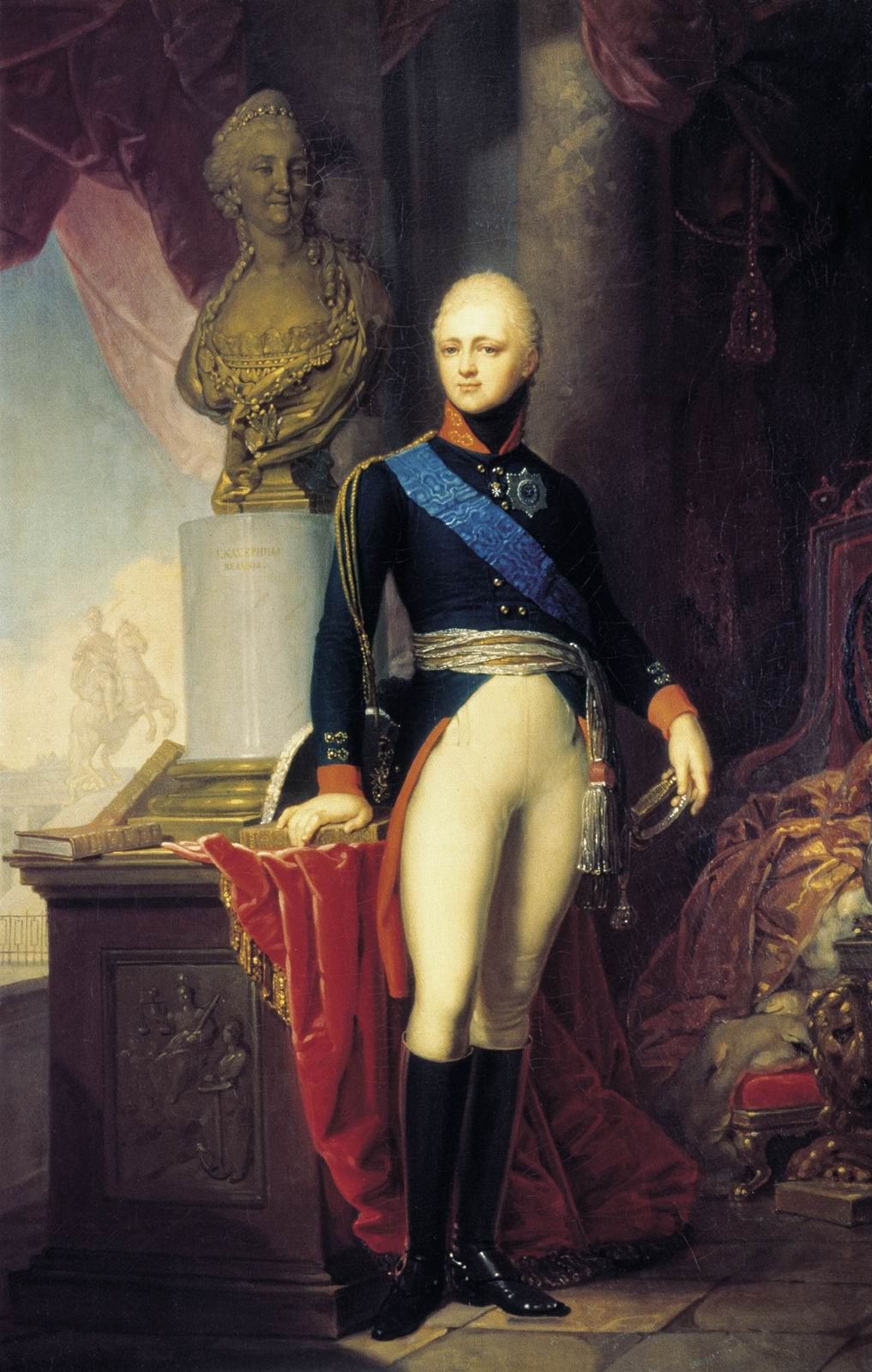
Portrait of Grand Duke Alexander Pavlovich, 1800, by Vladimir Borovikovsky

Alexander was born at 10:45, on 23 December 1777 in Saint Petersburg, and he and his younger brother Constantine were raised by their grandmother, Catherine. He was baptized on 31 December in the Grand Church of the Winter Palace by mitred archpriest Ioann Ioannovich Panfilov (confessor of Empress Catherine II). His godmother was Catherine the Great, and his godfathers were Joseph II, Holy Roman Emperor, and Frederick the Great. He was named after Alexander Nevsky, the patron saint of Saint Petersburg. As competing aspects of his upbringing, he imbibed the principles of Jean-Jacques Rousseau's gospel of humanity from the free-thinking atmosphere of the court of Catherine and his Swiss tutor, Frédéric-César de La Harpe, whereas he imbibed the traditions of Russian autocracy from his military governor, Nikolay Saltykov. Andrey Afanasyevich Samborsky, whom his grandmother chose to be his religious instructor, was an atypical, unbearded Orthodox priest. Samborsky had long lived in England and taught Alexander and his brother Constantine excellent English, a very uncommon accomplishment for potential Russian autocrats of the time.

On 9 October 1793, when Alexander was still 15 years old, he married 14-year-old Princess Louise of Baden, who took the name Elizabeth Alexeievna. His grandmother was the one who presided over his marriage to the young princess. Until his grandmother's death, he was constantly walking the line of allegiance between his grandmother and his father. His steward, Nikolai Saltykov, helped him navigate the political landscape, engendering dislike for his grandmother and dread in dealing with his father.

Catherine had the Alexander Palace built for the couple. This did nothing to help his relationship with her, as Catherine would go out of her way to amuse them with dancing and parties, which annoyed his wife. Living at the palace also put pressure on him to perform as a husband, though he felt only a brother's love for the Grand Duchess. He began to sympathise more with his father, as he saw visiting his father's fiefdom at Gatchina Palace as a relief from the ostentatious court of the empress. There, they wore simple Prussian military uniforms, instead of the gaudy clothing popular at the French court they had to wear when visiting Catherine. Even so, visiting the tsarevich did not come without a bit of travail. Paul liked to have his guests perform military drills, which he also pushed upon his sons, Alexander and Constantine. He was also prone to fits of temper, and he often went into fits of rage when events did not go his way. Some sources allege that the empress Catherine planned to remove her son Paul from the succession altogether (in consideration of his unstable temperament and bizarre personality traits) and make Alexander her successor instead.

== Tsarevich ==
Catherine's death in November 1796 brought her son Paul to the throne before she could appoint Alexander as her successor. Alexander disliked his father as emperor even more than he did his grandmother. He wrote that Russia had become a "plaything for the insane" and that "absolute power disrupts everything". It is likely that seeing two previous rulers abuse their autocratic powers in such a way pushed him to be one of the more progressive Romanov tsars of the 19th century. In the country as a whole, Paul was widely unpopular. He accused his wife of conspiring to become another Catherine and seize power from him as his mother did from his father. He also suspected Alexander of conspiring against him.

== Emperor ==
Russia (violet) and other European empires in 1800

=== Ascension ===
Alexander became Emperor of Russia when his father was assassinated on 23 March 1801. Alexander, then 23 years old, was in the Saint Michael's Castle at the moment of the assassination and his accession to the throne was announced by General Nicholas Zubov, one of the assassins. Historians still debate Alexander's role in his father's murder. The most common theory is that he was let into the conspirators' secret and was willing to take the throne, but insisted that his father should not be killed. Becoming emperor through a crime that cost his father's life would give Alexander a strong sense of remorse and shame. Alexander I succeeded to the throne that day and was crowned in the Kremlin on 15 September of that year.

=== Domestic policy ===
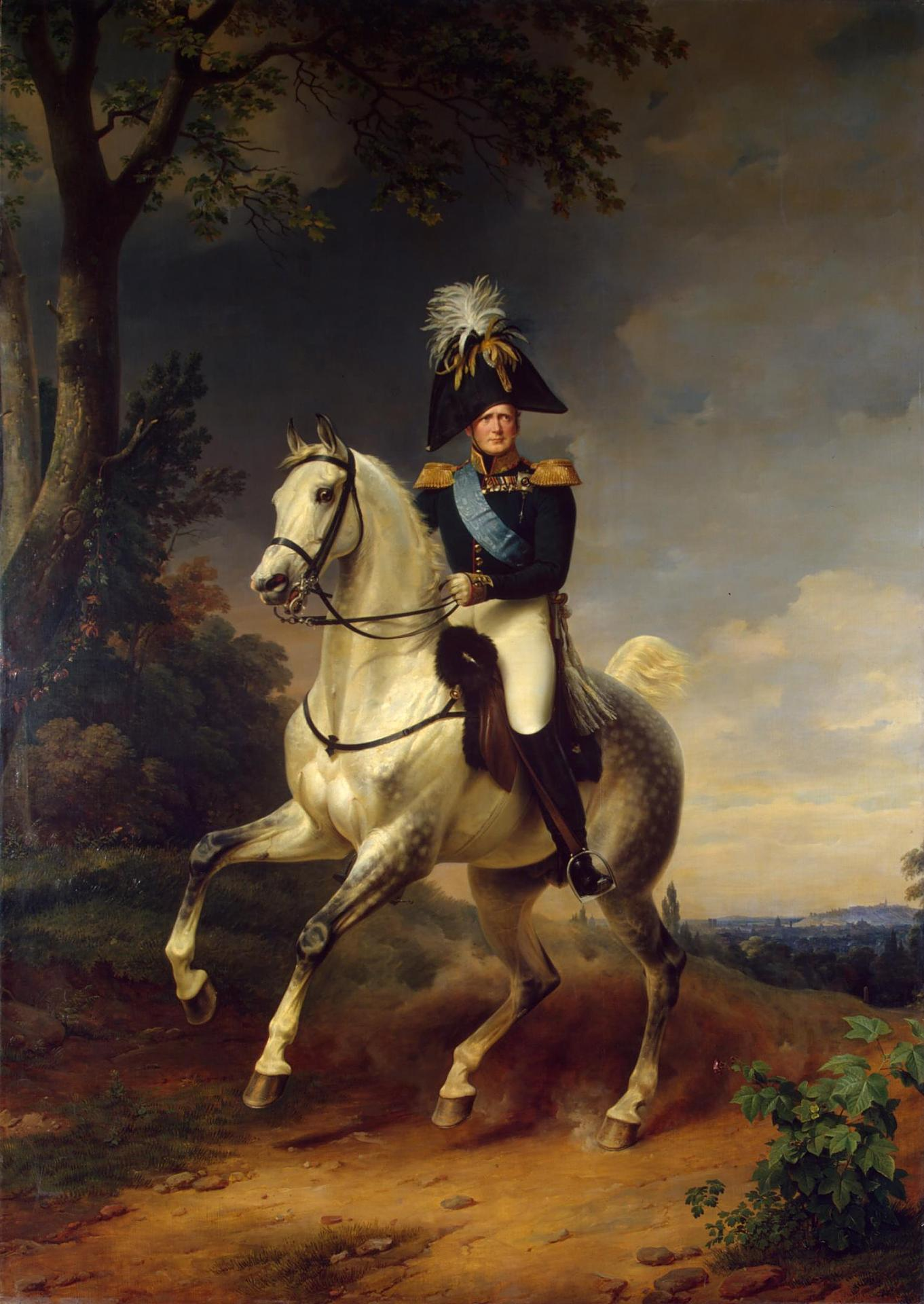
Equestrian portrait of Alexander I by Franz Krüger (1837, posthumous)

The Orthodox Church initially exercised little influence on Alexander's life. The young emperor was determined to reform the inefficient, highly centralised systems of government that Russia relied upon. While retaining for a time the old ministers, one of the first acts of his reign was to appoint the Private Committee, comprising young and enthusiastic friends of his own — Viktor Kochubey, Nikolay Novosiltsev, Pavel Stroganov and Adam Jerzy Czartoryski — to draw up a plan of domestic reform, which was supposed to result in the establishment of a constitutional monarchy in accordance with the teachings of the Age of Enlightenment.

A few years into his reign, the liberal Mikhail Speransky became one of the Emperor's closest advisors, and he drew up elaborate plans for reforms. In the Government reform, the old Collegia were abolished and new Ministries were created in their place, led by ministers responsible to the Crown. A Committee of Ministers under the chairmanship of the Sovereign dealt with all interdepartmental matters. The State Council was created to improve the technique of legislation. It was intended to become the Second Chamber of a representative legislature. The Governing Senate was reorganised as the Supreme Court of the Empire. The codification of the laws initiated in 1801 was never carried out during his reign.

Alexander wanted to resolve another crucial issue in Russia, the status of the serfs, although this was not achieved until 1861 (during the reign of his nephew Alexander II). His advisors quietly discussed the options at length. Cautiously, he extended the right to own land to most classes of subjects, including state-owned peasants, in 1801 and created a new social category of "free ploughman", for peasants voluntarily emancipated by their masters, in 1803. The great majority of serfs were not affected.

When Alexander's reign began, there were three universities in Russia, at Moscow, Vilna (Vilnius), and Dorpat (Tartu). These were strengthened, and three others were founded at Saint Petersburg, Kharkiv, and Kazan. Literary and scientific bodies were established or encouraged, and his reign became noted for the aid lent to the sciences and arts by the Emperor and the wealthy nobility. Alexander later expelled foreign scholars.

After 1815, the military settlements (farms worked by soldiers and their families under military control) were introduced, with the idea of making the army, or part of it, self-supporting economically and for providing it with recruits.

=== Views held by his contemporaries ===
Imperial monogram of Alexander I

Called both an autocrat and Jacobin, a man of the world and a mystic, Alexander appeared to his contemporaries as a riddle which each read according to his own temperament. Napoleon Bonaparte thought him a "shifty Byzantine", and called him the Talma of the North, as ready to play any conspicuous part. To Klemens von Metternich, he was a madman to be humoured. Robert Stewart, Viscount Castlereagh, writing of him to Robert Jenkinson, 2nd Earl of Liverpool, gave him credit for "grand qualities", but added that he is "suspicious and undecided"; and to Thomas Jefferson he was a man of estimable character, disposed to do good, and expected to diffuse through the mass of the Russian people "a sense of their natural rights". In 1803, Beethoven dedicated his Opus 30 Violin Sonata to Alexander who in response gave the famous composer a diamond at the Congress of Vienna where they met in 1814.

=== Napoleonic Wars ===
==== Alliances with other powers ====
Upon his accession, Alexander reversed many of the unpopular policies of his father, Paul, denounced the League of Armed Neutrality, and made peace with Britain (April 1801). At the same time, he opened negotiations with Francis II, Holy Roman Emperor. Soon afterwards, at Memel, he entered into a close alliance with Prussia, not as he boasted from motives of policy, but in the spirit of true chivalry, out of friendship for the young King Frederick William III of Prussia and his wife Louise of Mecklenburg-Strelitz.

The development of this alliance was interrupted by the short-lived peace of October 1801, and for a while it seemed as though France and Russia might come to an understanding. Carried away by the enthusiasm of Frédéric-César de La Harpe, who had returned to Russia from Paris, Alexander began openly to proclaim his admiration for French institutions and for the person of Napoleon Bonaparte. Soon, however, came a change. La Harpe, after a new visit to Paris, presented to Alexander his Reflections on the True Nature of the Consul for Life, which, as Alexander said, tore the veil from his eyes and revealed Bonaparte "as not a true patriot", but only as "the most famous tyrant the world has produced". Later on, La Harpe and his friend Henri Monod lobbied Alexander, who persuaded the other Allied powers opposing Napoleon to recognise Vaudois and Argovian independence, in spite of Bern's attempts to reclaim them as subject lands. Alexander's disillusionment was completed by the execution of the Louis Antoine, Duke of Enghien on trumped up charges. The Russian court went into mourning for the last member of the Princes of Condé, and diplomatic relations with France were broken off. Alexander was especially alarmed and decided he had to somehow curb Napoleon's power.

==== Opposition to Napoleon ====
In opposing Napoleon I, "the oppressor of Europe and the disturber of the world's peace," Alexander in fact already believed himself to be fulfilling a divine mission. In his instructions to Niklolay Novosiltsev, his special envoy in London, the emperor elaborated the motives of his policy in language that appealed little to the prime minister, William Pitt the Younger. Yet the document is of great interest, as it formulates for the first time in an official dispatch the ideals of international policy that were to play a conspicuous part in world affairs at the close of the revolutionary epoch. (Note: It was issued at the end of the 19th century in the Rescript of Nicholas II and the conference of The Hague (Phillips 1911, p. 557 cites: Circular of Count Muraviev, 24 August 1898).) Alexander argued that the outcome of the war was not only to be the liberation of France, but the universal triumph of "the sacred rights of humanity". To attain this it would be necessary "after having attached the nations to their government by making these incapable of acting save in the greatest interests of their subjects, to fix the relations of the states amongst each other on more precise rules, and such as it is to their interest to respect".

A general treaty was to become the main basis of the relations of the states forming "the European Confederation". While he believed the effort would not attain universal peace, it would be worthwhile if it established clear principles for the prescriptions of the rights of nations. The body would assure "the positive rights of nations" and "the privilege of neutrality", while asserting the obligation to exhaust all resources of mediation to retain peace, and would form "a new code of the law of nations".

==== 1807 loss to French forces ====
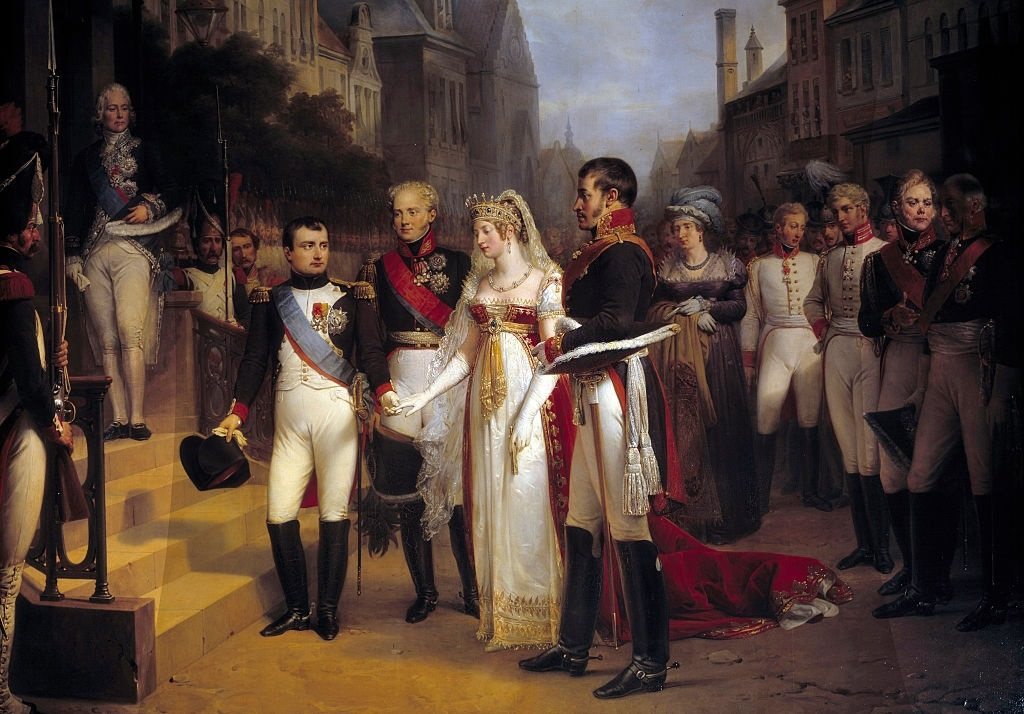
Napoleon, Alexander, Queen Louise, and Frederick William III of Prussia in Tilsit, 1807

Meanwhile, Napoleon never gave up hope of detaching him from the coalition. He had no sooner entered Vienna in triumph than he opened negotiations with Alexander; he resumed them after the Battle of Austerlitz (2 December). Russia and France, he urged, were "geographical allies"; there was, and could be, between them no true conflict of interests; together they might rule the world. But Alexander was still determined "to persist in the system of disinterestedness in respect of all the states of Europe which he had thus far followed", and he again allied himself with the Kingdom of Prussia. The campaign of Jena and the Battle of Eylau followed; and Napoleon, though still intent on the Russian alliance, stirred up Poles, Turks and Persians to break the obstinacy of the Tsar. A party too in Russia itself, headed by the Tsar's brother Constantine Pavlovich, was clamorous for peace; but Alexander, after a vain attempt to form a new coalition, summoned the Russian nation to a holy war against Napoleon as the enemy of the Orthodox faith. The outcome was the rout of Friedland (13/14 June 1807). Napoleon saw his chance and seized it. Instead of demanding harsh peace terms, he offered to the chastened autocrat his alliance, and a partnership in his glory.

The two Emperors met at Tilsit on 25 June 1807. Napoleon knew how to appeal to the imagination of his new-found friend. He would divide with Alexander the Empire of the world; as a first step he would leave him in possession of the Danubian Principalities and give him a free hand to deal with Finland; and, afterwards, the Emperors of the East and West, when the time should be ripe, would drive the Turks from Europe and march across Asia to the conquest of India. Nevertheless, a thought awoke in Alexander's impressionable mind an ambition to which he had hitherto been a stranger. The interests of Europe as a whole were completely forgotten.

=== Prussia ===
The brilliance of these new visions did not, however, blind Alexander to the obligations of friendship, and he refused to retain the Danubian principalities as the price for suffering a further dismemberment of Prussia. "We have made loyal war", he said, "we must make a loyal peace". It was not long before the first enthusiasm of Tilsit began to wane. The French remained in Prussia, the Russians on the Danube, and each accused the other of breach of faith. Meanwhile, however, the personal relations of Alexander and Napoleon were of the most cordial character, and it was hoped that a fresh meeting might adjust all differences between them. The meeting took place at Erfurt in October 1808 and resulted in a treaty that defined the common policy of the two Emperors. But Alexander's relations with Napoleon nonetheless suffered a change. He realised that in Napoleon sentiment never got the better of reason, that as a matter of fact he had never intended his proposed "grand enterprise" seriously, and had only used it to preoccupy the mind of the Tsar while he consolidated his own power in Central Europe. From this moment the French alliance was for Alexander also not a fraternal agreement to rule the world, but an affair of pure policy. He used it initially to remove "the geographical enemy" from the gates of Saint Petersburg by wresting Finland from Sweden (1809), and he hoped further to make the Danube the southern frontier of Russia.

=== Franco-Russian alliance ===
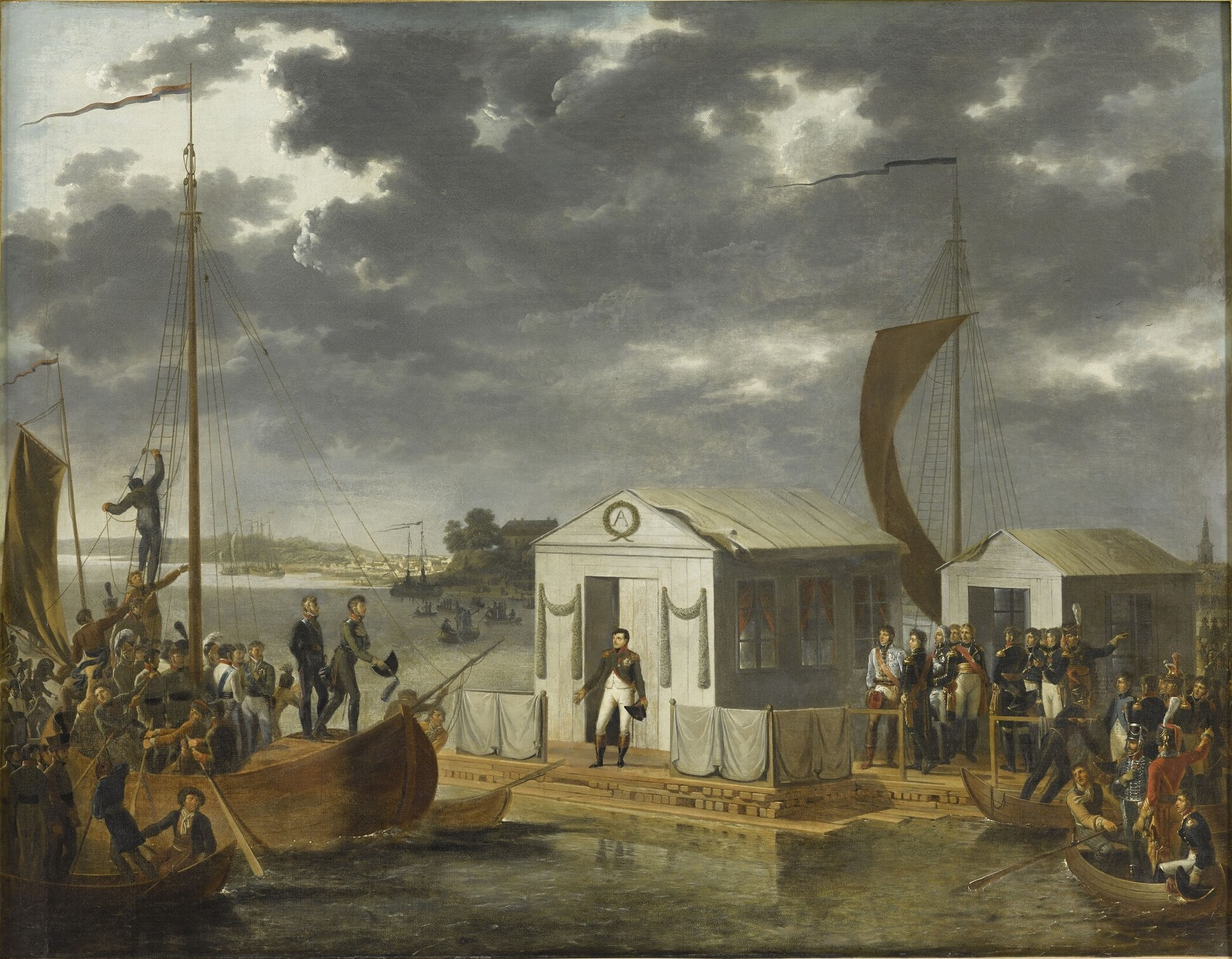
The Meeting of Napoleon I and Tsar Alexander I at Tilsit by Adolphe Roehn, 1808

Events were rapidly heading towards the rupture of the Franco-Russian alliance. While Alexander assisted Napoleon in the War of the Fifth Coalition in 1809, he declared plainly that he would not allow the Austrian Empire to be crushed out of existence. Napoleon subsequently complained bitterly of the inactivity of the Russian troops during the campaign. The tsar in turn protested against Napoleon's encouragement of the Poles. In the matter of the French alliance he knew himself to be practically isolated in Russia, and he declared that he could not sacrifice the interest of his people and empire to his affection for Napoleon. "I don't want anything for myself", he said to the French ambassador, "therefore the world is not large enough to come to an understanding on the affairs of Poland, if it is a question of its restoration".

Alexander complained that the Treaty of Schönbrunn, which added largely to the Duchy of Warsaw, had "ill requited him for his loyalty", and he was only mollified for the time being by Napoleon's public declaration that he had no intention of restoring Poland, and by a convention, signed on 4 January 1810, but not ratified, abolishing the Polish name and orders of chivalry.

But if Alexander suspected Napoleon's intentions, Napoleon was no less suspicious of Alexander. Partly to test his sincerity, Napoleon sent an almost peremptory request for the hand of the grand-duchess Anna Pavlovna, the tsar's youngest sister. After some little delay Alexander returned a polite refusal, pleading the princess's youth and the objection of the dowager empress to the marriage. Napoleon's answer was to refuse to ratify the 4 January convention, and to announce his engagement to the Archduchess Marie Louise in such a way as to lead Alexander to suppose that the two marriage treaties had been negotiated simultaneously. From this time on, the relationship between the two emperors gradually became more and more strained.

Another personal grievance for Alexander towards Napoleon was the annexation of Oldenburg by France in December 1810, as Wilhelm, Duke of Oldenburg (3 January 1754 – 2 July 1823) was the uncle of the tsar. Furthermore, the disastrous impact of the Continental System on Russian trade made it impossible for the emperor to maintain a policy that was Napoleon's chief motive for the alliance.

Alexander kept Russia as neutral as possible in the ongoing French war with Britain, Russia's own war with Britain barely any more than nominal. He allowed trade to continue secretly with Britain and did not enforce the blockade required by the Continental System. In 1810, he withdrew Russia from the Continental System and trade between Britain and Russia grew.

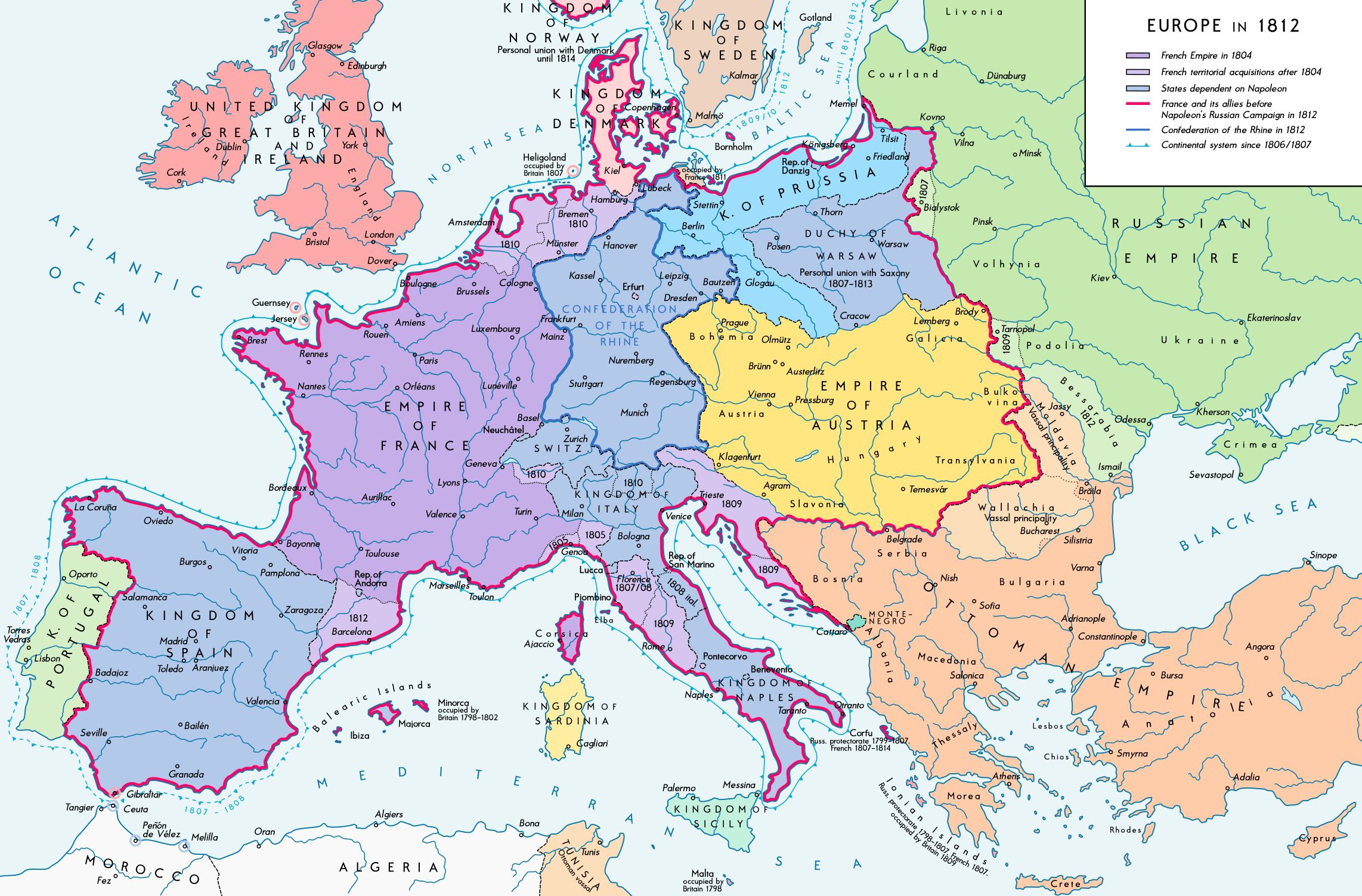
The French Empire in 1812 at its greatest extent

Relations between France and Russia worsened progressively after 1810. By 1811, it became clear that Napoleon was not adhering to his side of the terms of the Treaty of Tilsit. He had promised assistance to Russia in its war against the Ottoman Empire, but as the campaign went on, France offered no support at all.

With war imminent between France and Russia, Alexander started to prepare the ground diplomatically. In April 1812, Russia and Sweden signed a treaty for mutual defence. A month later, Alexander secured his southern flank through the Treaty of Bucharest (1812), which ended the war against the Ottomans formally. His diplomats managed to extract promises from Prussia and Austria that should Napoleon invade Russia, the former would help Napoleon as little as possible and that the latter would give no aid at all.

The minister of war, Michael Andreas Barclay de Tolly, had managed the reform and improvement of the Imperial Russian Army before the start of the 1812 campaign. Primarily on the advice of his sister and Count Aleksey Arakcheyev, Alexander did not take operational control as he had done during the 1805 campaign, instead delegating control to his generals, Barclay de Tolly, Prince Pyotr Bagration and Mikhail Kutuzov.

=== War against Persia ===
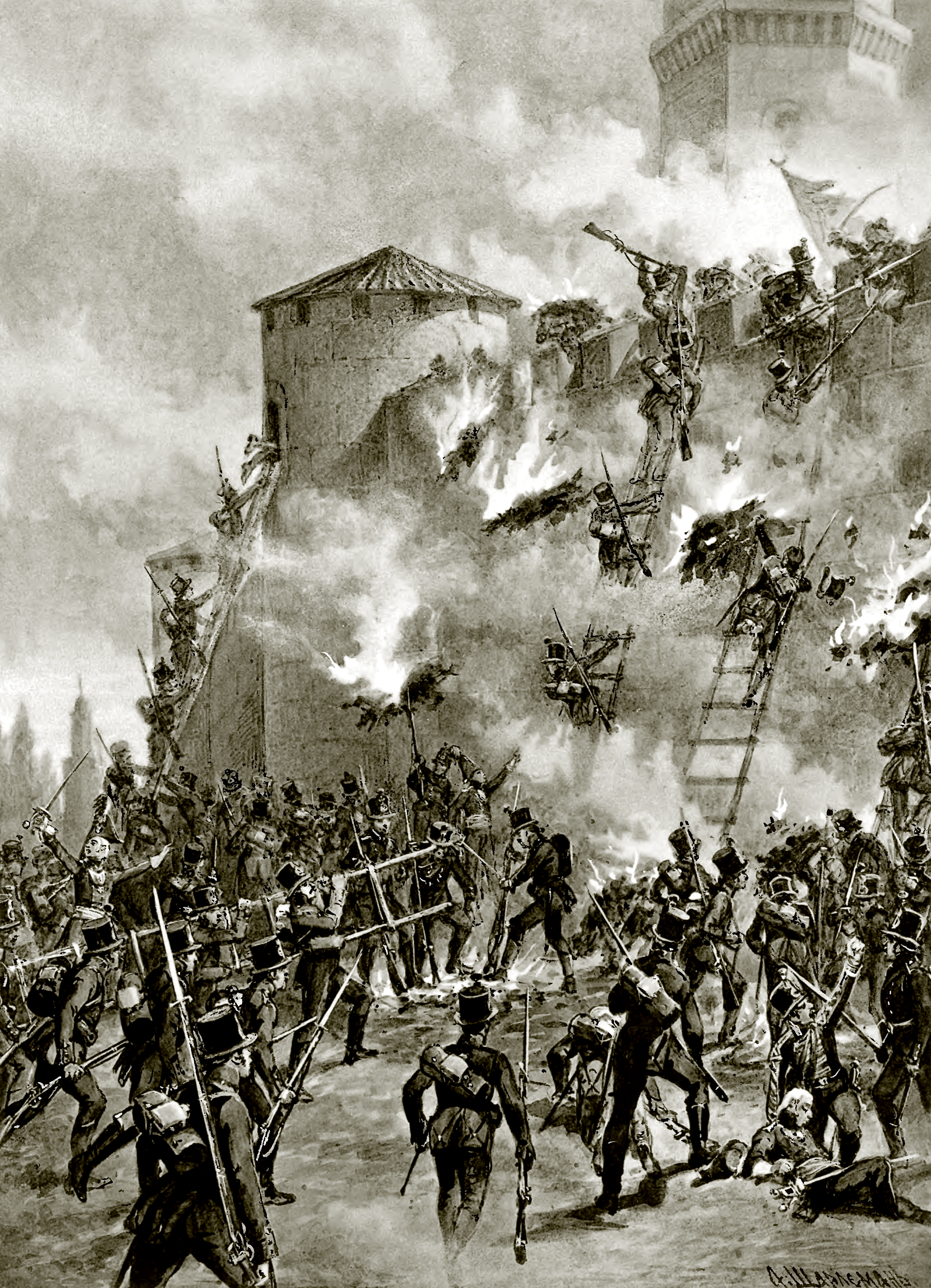
The Battle of Ganja during the Russo-Persian War

Despite brief hostilities in the Persian Expedition of 1796, eight years of peace passed before a new conflict erupted between the two empires. After the Russian annexation of the Georgian Kingdom of Kartli-Kakheti in 1801, a subject of Persia for centuries, and the incorporation of the Derbent Khanate as well quickly thereafter, Alexander was determined to increase and maintain Russian influence in the strategically valuable Caucasus region. In 1801, Alexander appointed Pavel Tsitsianov, a die-hard Russian imperialist of Georgian origin, as Russian commander in chief of the Caucasus. Between 1802 and 1804 he proceeded to impose Russian rule on Western Georgia and some of the Persian controlled khanates around Georgia. Some of these khanates submitted without a fight, but the Ganja Khanate resisted, prompting an attack. Ganja was ruthlessly sacked during the Siege of Ganja, with some 3,000 – 7,000 inhabitants of Ganja executed, and thousands more expelled to Persia. These attacks by Tsitsianov formed another casus belli.

On 23 May 1804, Persia demanded withdrawal from the regions Russia had occupied, comprising what is now Georgia, Dagestan, and parts of Azerbaijan. Russia refused, stormed Ganja, and declared war. Following an almost ten-year stalemate centred around what is now Dagestan, east Georgia, Azerbaijan, northern Armenia, with neither party being able to gain the clear upper hand, Russia eventually managed to turn the tide. After a series of successful offensives led by General Pyotr Kotlyarevsky, including a decisive victory in the Siege of Lankaran, Persia was forced to sue for peace. In October 1813, the Treaty of Gulistan, negotiated with British mediation and signed at Gulistan, made the Persian Shah Fath Ali Shah cede all Persian territories in the North Caucasus and most of its territories in the South Caucasus to Russia. This included what is now Dagestan, Georgia, and most of Azerbaijan. It also began a large demographic shift in the Caucasus, as many Muslim families emigrated to Persia

=== French invasion ===
In the summer of 1812 Napoleon invaded Russia. It was the occupation of Moscow and the desecration of the Kremlin, considered to be the sacred centre of Holy Russia, that changed Alexander's sentiment for Napoleon into passionate hatred. (Note: On the historiography, see Lieven 2006, pp. 283–308.) The campaign of 1812 was the turning point for Alexander's life; after the burning of Moscow, he declared that his own soul had found illumination, and that he had realized once and for all the divine revelation to him of his mission as the peacemaker of Europe.

While the Russian army retreated deep into Russia for almost three months, the nobility pressured Alexander to relieve the commander of the Russian army, Field Marshal Barclay de Tolly. Alexander complied and appointed Prince Mikhail Kutuzov to take over command of the army. On 7 September, the Grande Armée faced the Russian army at a small village called Borodino, 110 kilometres (70 mi) west of Moscow. The battle that followed was the largest and bloodiest single-day action of the Napoleonic Wars, involving more than 250,000 soldiers and resulting in 70,000 casualties. The outcome of the battle was inconclusive. The Russian army, undefeated in spite of heavy losses, was able to withdraw the following day, leaving the French without the decisive victory Napoleon sought.

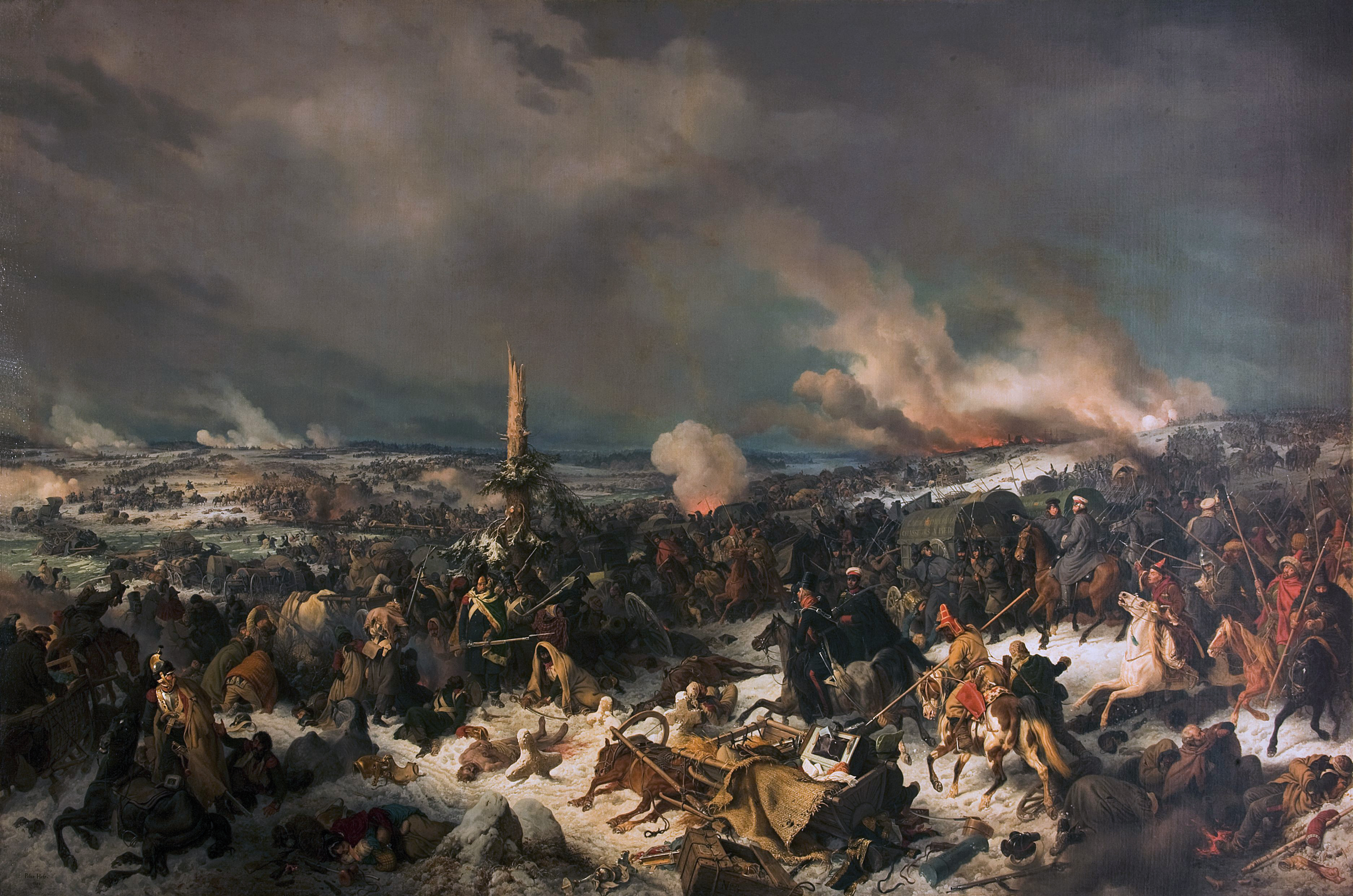
Crossing the Berezina River by Peter von Hess, 1844. The retreat across the Berezina of the remnants of Napoleon's Grande Armée in November 1812

A week later, Napoleon entered Moscow, but there was no delegation to meet the Emperor. The Russians had evacuated the city, and the city's governor, Count Fyodor Rostopchin, ordered several strategic points in Moscow to be set ablaze. The loss of Moscow did not compel Alexander to sue for peace. After staying in the city for a month, Napoleon moved his army out southwest toward Kaluga, where Kutuzov was encamped with the Russian army. The French advance toward Kaluga was checked by the Russian army, and Napoleon was forced to retreat to the areas already devastated by the invasion. In the weeks that followed the Grande Armée starved and suffered from the onset of the Russian Winter. Lack of food and fodder for the horses and persistent attacks upon isolated troops from Russian peasants and Cossacks led to great losses. When the remnants of the French army eventually crossed the Berezina river in November, only 27,000 soldiers remained; the Grande Armée had lost some 380,000 men dead and 100,000 captured. Following the crossing of the Berezina, Napoleon left the army and returned to Paris to protect his position as Emperor and to raise more forces to resist the advancing Russians. The campaign ended on 14 December 1812, with the last French troops finally leaving Russian soil.

The campaign was a turning point in the Napoleonic Wars. Napoleon's reputation was severely shaken, and French hegemony in Europe was weakened. The Grande Armée, made up of French and allied forces, was reduced to a fraction of its initial strength. These events triggered a major shift in European politics. France's ally Prussia, soon followed by Austria, broke their imposed alliance with Napoleon and switched sides, triggering the War of the Sixth Coalition.

=== War of the Sixth Coalition ===
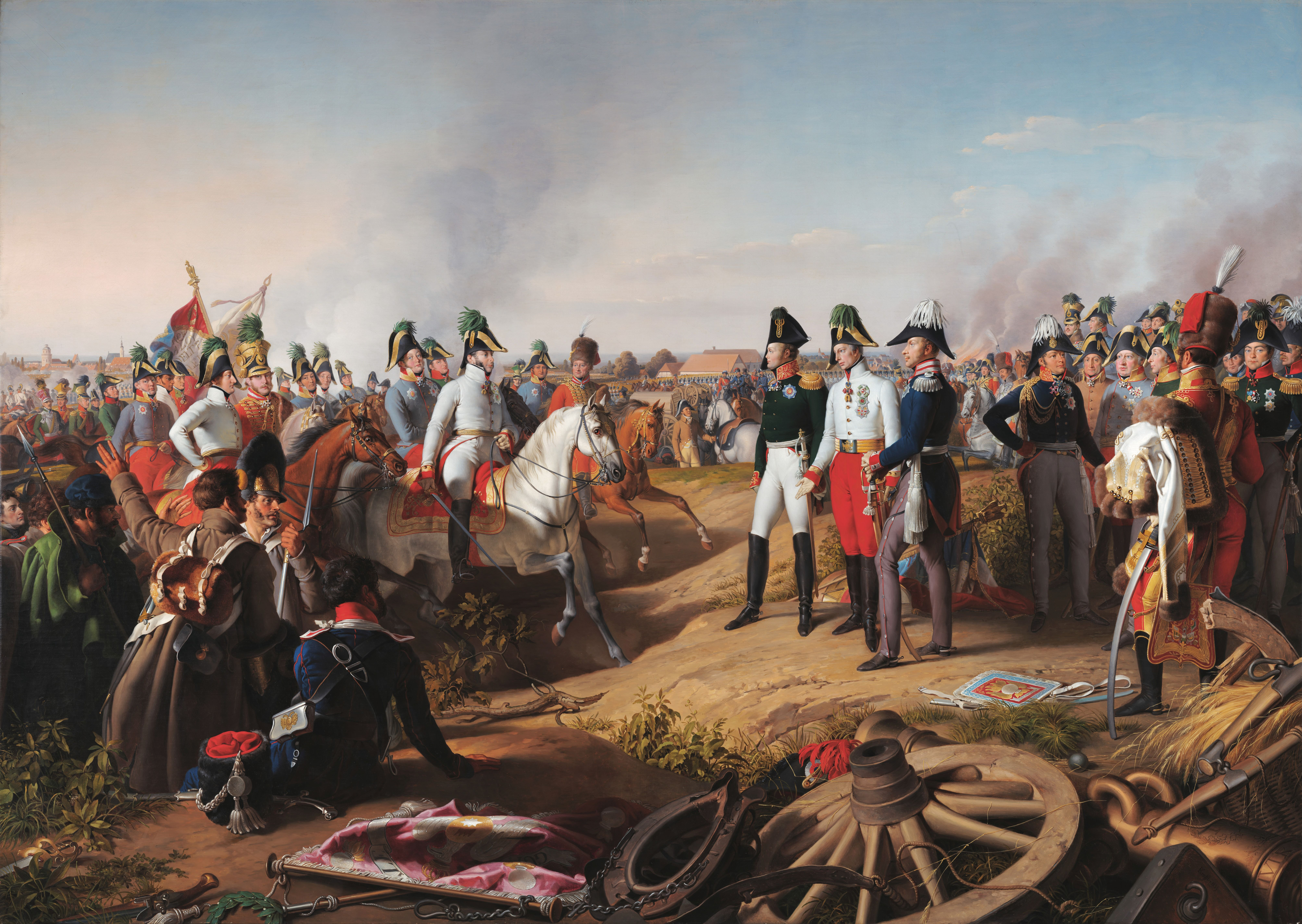
The Declaration of Victory After the Battle of Leipzig by Johann Peter Krafft. Alexander, Francis I of Austria and Frederick William III of Prussia meeting after the Battle of Leipzig, 1813

With the Russian army following up victory over Napoleon in 1812, the Sixth Coalition was formed with Russia, Prussia, Great Britain, Sweden, Spain, and other nations. Although the French were victorious in the initial battles during the campaign in Germany, the entry of Austria into the war led to France's decisive defeat at the Battle of Leipzig in the autumn of 1813, which proved to be a massive victory for the Coalition. Following the battle, the Pro-French Confederation of the Rhine collapsed, thereby ending Napoleon's hold on territory east of the Rhine forever. Alexander, being the supreme commander of the Coalition forces in the theatre and the paramount monarch among the three main Coalition monarchs, ordered all Coalition forces in Germany to cross the Rhine and invade France.

The Coalition forces, divided into three groups, entered northeastern France in January 1814. Facing them in the theatre were the French forces numbering only about 70,000 men. In spite of being heavily outnumbered, Napoleon defeated the divided Coalition forces in the battles at Brienne and La Rothière, but could not stop the Coalition's advance and triumphant victory over Napoleon. Austrian Emperor Francis I and King Frederick William III of Prussia felt demoralized upon hearing about Napoleon's victories since the start of the campaign. They even considered ordering a general retreat. But Alexander was far more determined than ever to victoriously enter Paris whatever the cost, imposing his will upon Karl Philipp, Prince of Schwarzenberg, and the wavering monarchs. On 28 March, Coalition forces advanced towards Paris and prepared to launch an assault.

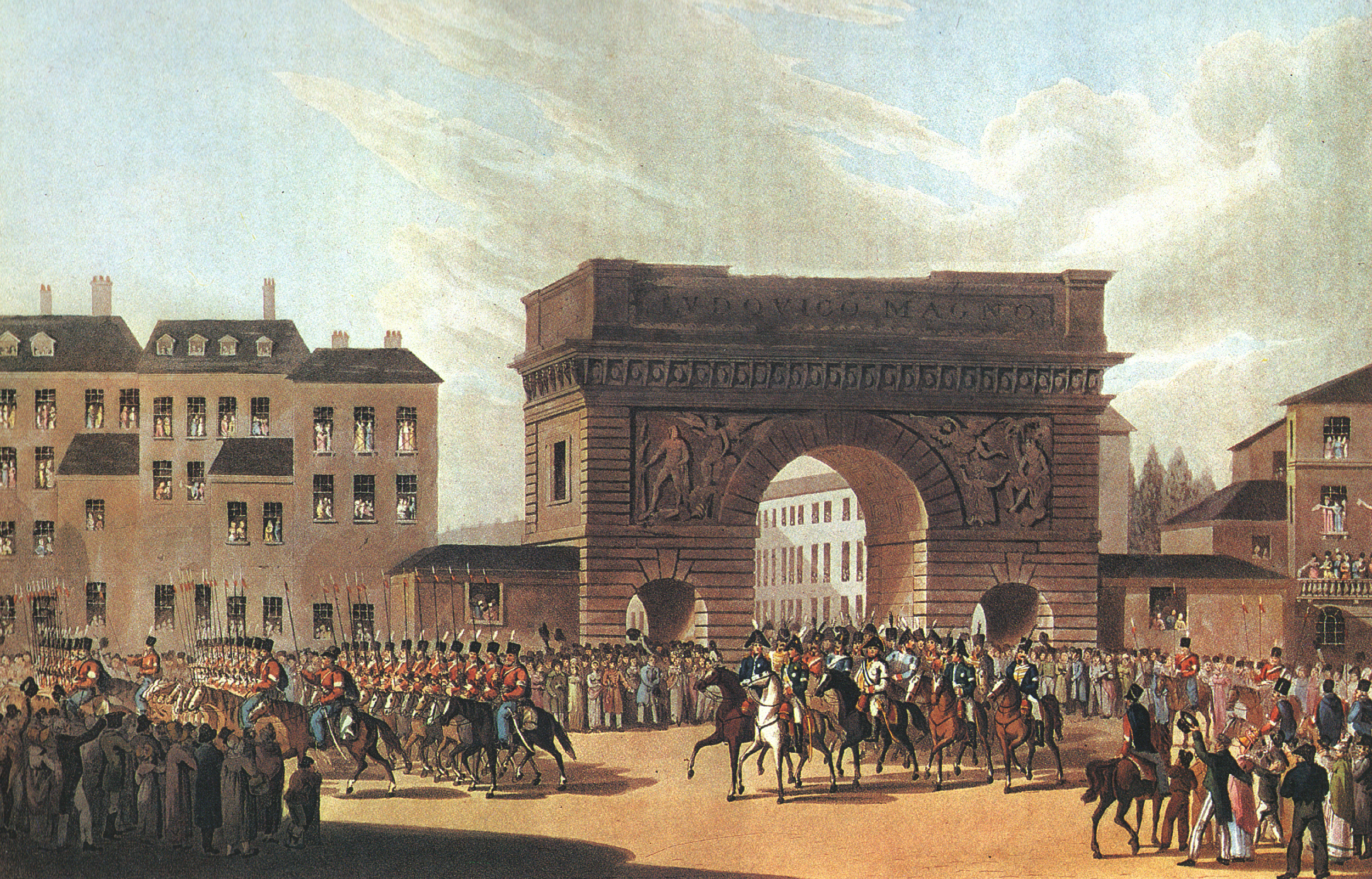
The Russian Army entering Paris in 1814

Camping outside the city on 29 March, the Coalition armies were to assault the city from its northern and eastern sides the next morning on 30 March. The battle started that same morning with intense artillery bombardment from the Coalition positions. Early in the morning the Coalition attack began when the Russians attacked and drove back the French skirmishers near Belleville before being driven back themselves by French cavalry from the city's eastern suburbs. By 7:00 a.m. the Russians attacked the Young Guard near Romainville in the centre of the French lines and after some time and hard fighting, pushed them back. A few hours later the Prussians, under Gebhard Leberecht von Blücher, attacked north of the city and carried the French position around Aubervilliers, but did not press their attack. The Württemberg troops seized the positions at Saint-Maur to the southeast, with Austrian troops in support. The Russian forces then assailed the heights of Montmartre in the city's northeast. Control of the heights was severely contested, until the French forces surrendered.

Alexander sent an envoy to meet with the French to hasten the surrender. He offered generous terms to the French and although having intended to avenge Moscow, he declared himself to be bringing peace to France rather than its destruction. On 31 March Talleyrand gave the key of the city to the tsar. Later that day the Coalition armies triumphantly entered the city with Alexander at the head of the army followed by the King of Prussia and Prince Schwarzenberg. Until this battle it had been nearly 400 years since a foreign army had entered Paris, during the Hundred Years' War.

On 2 April, the Sénat conservateur passed the Acte de déchéance de l'Empereur, which declared Napoleon deposed. Napoleon was in Fontainebleau when he heard that Paris had surrendered. Outraged, he wanted to march on the capital, but his marshals refused to fight for him and repeatedly urged him to surrender. He abdicated in favour of his son on 4 April, but the Allies rejected this out of hand, forcing Napoleon to abdicate unconditionally on 6 April. The terms of his abdication, which included his exile to the Isle of Elba, were settled in the Treaty of Fontainebleau on 11 April. A reluctant Napoleon ratified it two days later, marking the end of the War of the Sixth Coalition.

== Postbellum ==
=== Peace of Paris and the Congress of Vienna ===
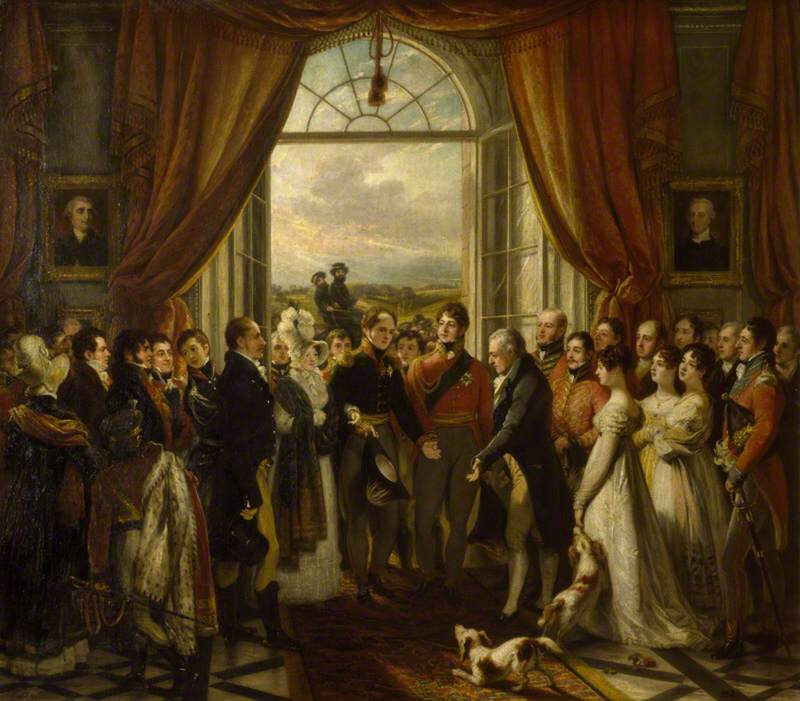
Allied sovereigns' visit to England in June 1814

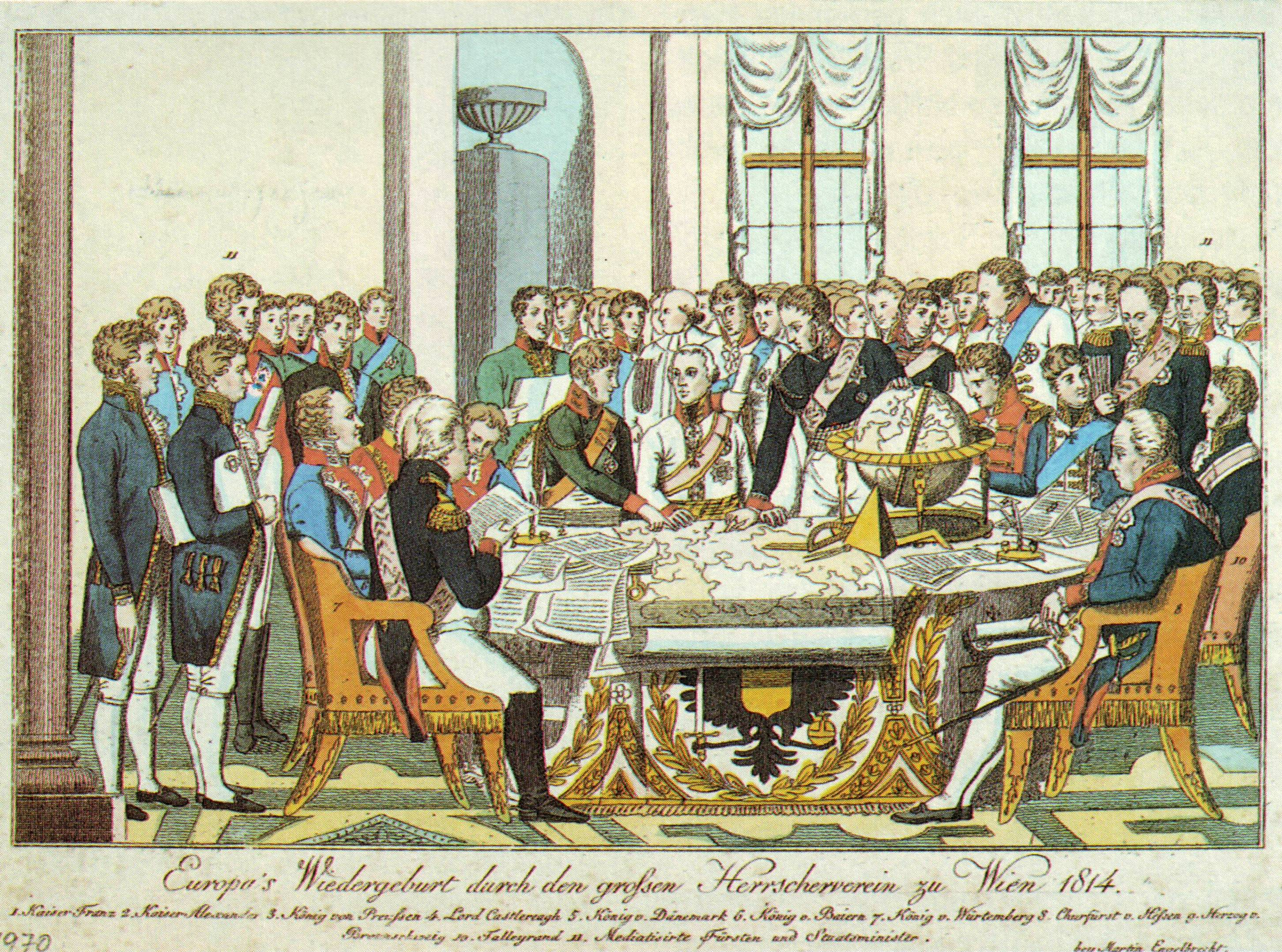
Negotiations at the Congress of Vienna

Alexander tried to calm the unrest of his conscience by correspondence with the leaders of the evangelical revival on the continent and sought for omens and supernatural guidance in texts and passages of scripture. It was not, however, according to his own account, until he met the Baroness de Krüdener—a religious adventuress who made the conversion of princes her special mission—at Basel, in the autumn of 1813, that his soul found peace. From this time a mystic pietism became the avowed force of his political, as of his private actions. Madame de Krüdener, and her colleague, the evangelist Henri-Louis Empaytaz, became the confidants of the emperor's most secret thoughts; and during the campaign that ended in the occupation of Paris the imperial prayer-meetings were the oracle on whose revelations hung the fate of the world.

Such was Alexander's mood when the downfall of Napoleon left him one of the most powerful sovereigns in Europe. With the memory of the Treaty of Tilsit still fresh in men's minds, it was not unnatural that to cynical men of the world like Klemens Wenzel von Metternich he merely seemed to be disguising "under the language of evangelical abnegation" vast and perilous schemes of ambition. The puzzled powers were, in fact, the more inclined to be suspicious in view of other, and seemingly inconsistent, tendencies of the emperor, which yet seemed all to point to a like disquieting conclusion. For Madame de Krüdener was not the only influence behind the throne; and, though Alexander had declared war against the Revolution, La Harpe (his erstwhile tutor) was once more at his elbow, and the catchwords of the gospel of humanity were still on his lips. The very proclamations which denounced Napoleon as "the genius of evil", denounced him in the name of "liberty", and of "enlightenment". Conservatives suspected Alexander of a monstrous intrigue by which the eastern autocrat would ally with the Jacobinism of all Europe, aiming at an all-powerful Russia in place of an all-powerful France. At the Congress of Vienna Alexander's attitude accentuated this distrust. Robert Stewart, Viscount Castlereagh, whose single-minded aim was the restoration of "a just equilibrium" in Europe, reproached the Tsar to his face for a "conscience" which led him to imperil the concert of the powers by keeping his hold on Poland in violation of his treaty obligation.

During the Congress of Vienna at Easter 1815, Tsar Alexander I of Russia expressed a desire to “visit a Slavic church,” and Emperor Francis I of Austria took him to a service at the Ukrainian Greek Catholic Church of St. Barbara in Vienna, whose parish priest at that time was the prominent Ukrainian religious, cultural, and political figure Ivan Snihurskyi (later Bishop of Peremyshl).

=== Liberal political views ===
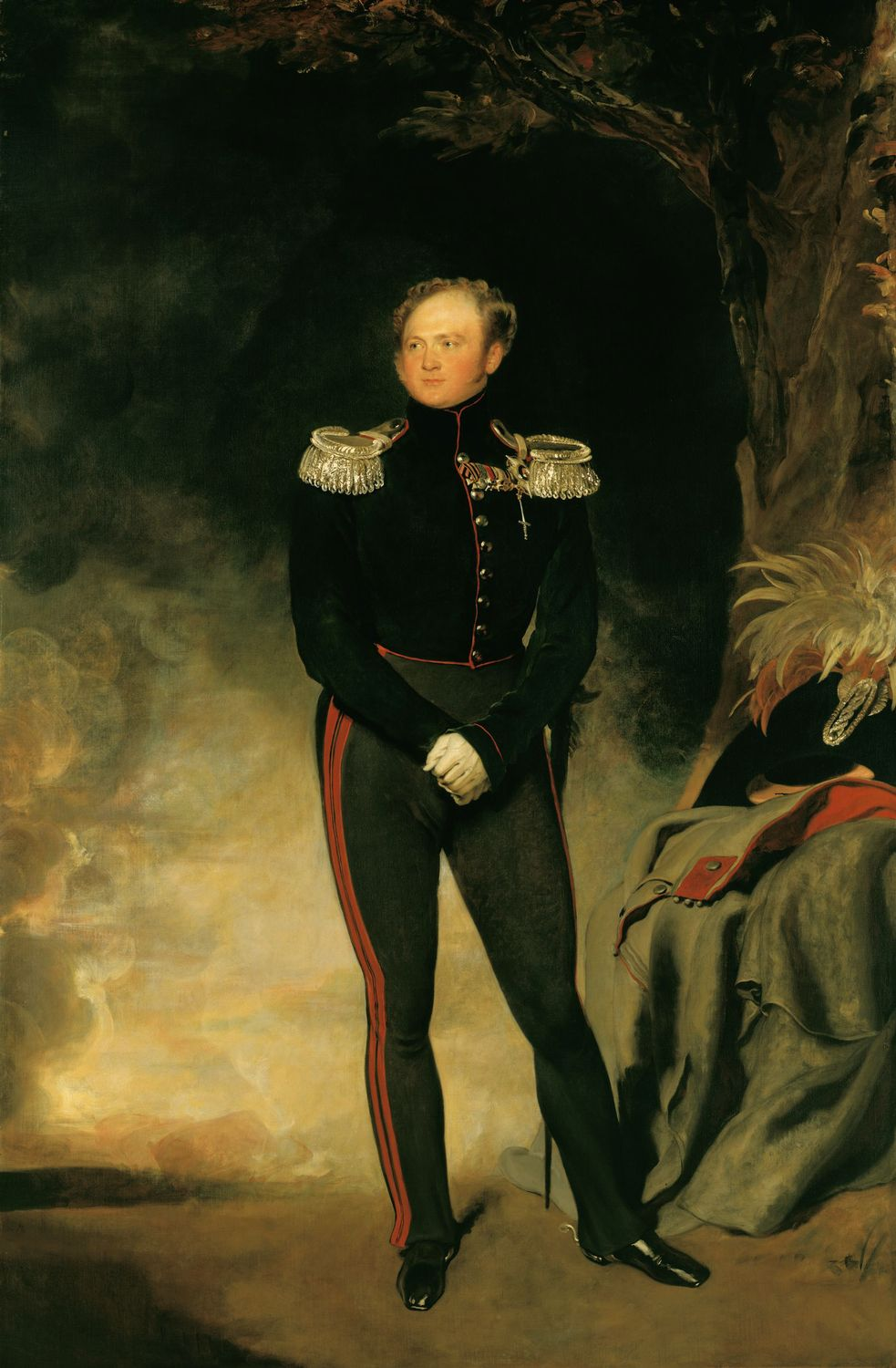
Portrait of Alexander I by Thomas Lawrence, 1818

Once a supporter of limited liberalism, as seen in his approval of the representative institutions in the Ionian Islands, Grand Duchy of Finland and the Constitution of the Kingdom of Poland in 1815, from the end of the year 1818 Alexander's views began to change. A revolutionary conspiracy among the officers of the Russian Imperial Guard, and a plot to kidnap him on his way to the Congress of Aix-la-Chapelle, are said to have shaken his liberal beliefs. At Aix he came for the first time into intimate contact with Metternich. From this time dates the ascendancy of Metternich over the mind of the Russian Emperor and in the councils of Europe.

It was, however, no case of sudden conversion. Though alarmed by the revolutionary agitation in Germany, which culminated in the murder of his agent, the dramatist August von Kotzebue (23 March 1819), Alexander joined Castlereagh's protest against Metternich's collective security policy of "the governments contracting an alliance against the peoples", as formulated in the Carlsbad Decrees of July 1819. Alexander deprecated any intervention of a European league in the affairs of individucal nations to support "the absurd pretensions of 'absolute power'". He still declared his belief in free institutions with limitations. "Liberty", he maintained, "should be confined within just limits. And the limits of liberty are the principles of order".

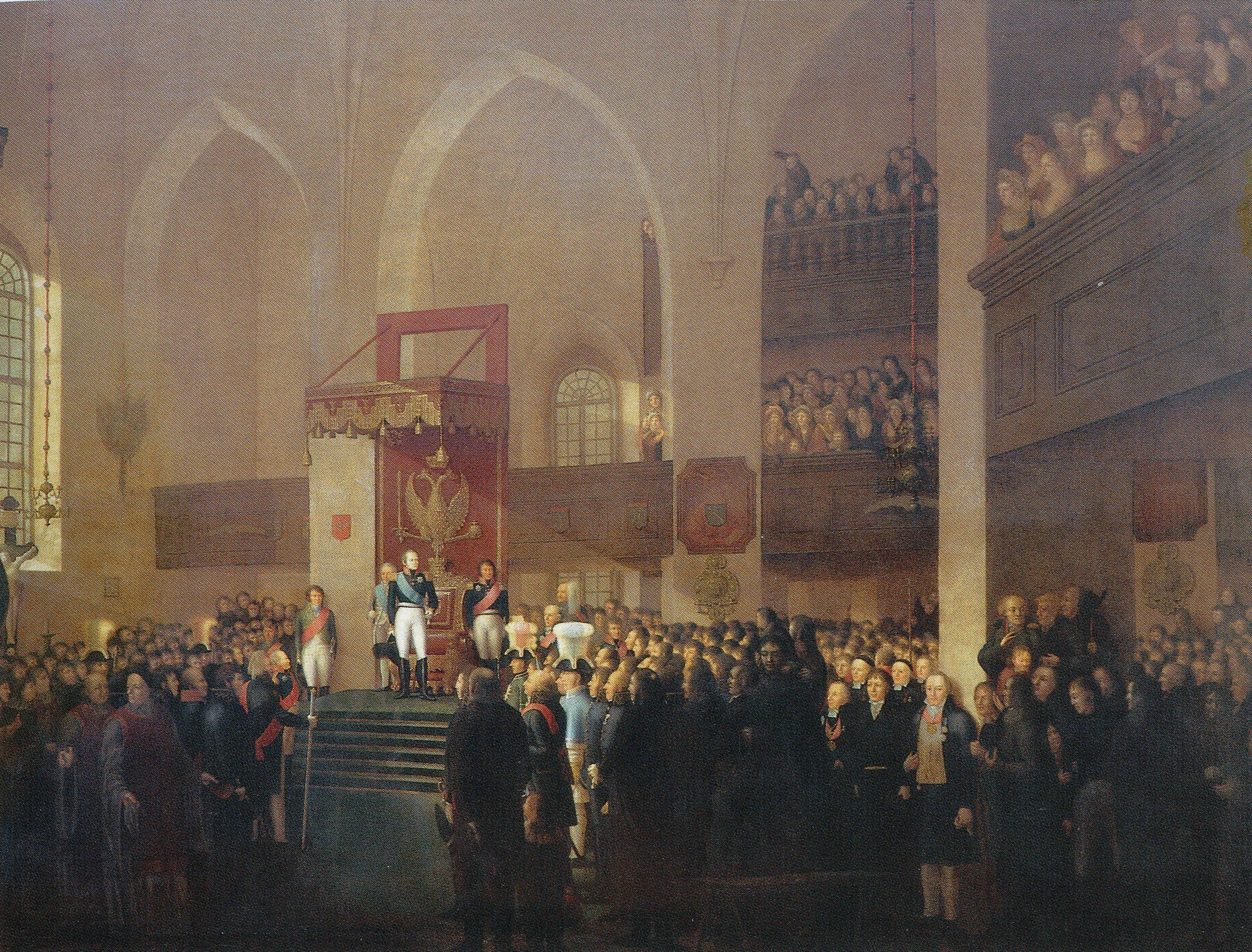
Alexander I confirmed the new Finnish constitution and made Finland an autonomous Grand Duchy at the Diet of Porvoo in 1809.

Alexander's conversion was completed by the 1820 revolutions in Naples and Piedmont, combined with increasingly disquieting symptoms of discontent in France, Germany, and among his own people. In the seclusion of the little town of Troppau, where in October 1820 the powers met in conference, Metternich cemented his influence over Alexander, which had been wanting amid the turmoil and intrigues of Vienna and Aix. During a friendly conversation over afternoon tea, the disillusioned autocrat confessed his mistake. "You have nothing to regret," he said sadly to the exultant chancellor, "but I have!".

The issue was momentous. In January, Alexander had still upheld the ideal of a free confederation of the European states, the Holy Alliance, against the policy of a dictatorship of the great powers, the Quadruple Treaty. He gave in on 19 November by signing the Troppau Protocol, which consecrated the claims of collective Europe to interfere in the internal concerns of the sovereign states.

=== Revolt of the Greeks ===
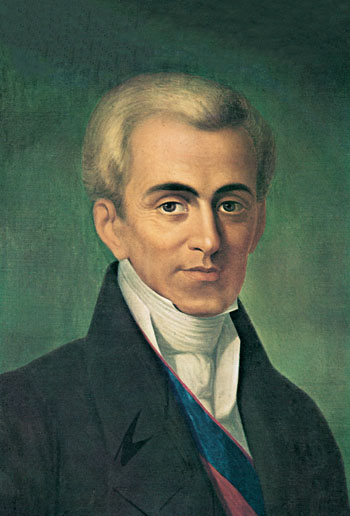
Ioannis Kapodistrias, Russia's former foreign minister, was elected as the first head of state of independent Greece

At the Congress of Laibach, which had been adjourned in the spring of 1821, Alexander received news of the Greek revolt against the Ottoman Empire. From this time until his death, Alexander's mind was torn between his dreams of a stable confederation of Europe and his traditional mission as leader of the Orthodox crusade against the Ottomans. At first, under the careful advice of Metternich, Alexander chose the former.

Siding against the Greek revolt for the sake of stability in the region, Alexander expelled its leader Alexander Ypsilantis from the Russian Imperial Cavalry, and directed his foreign minister, Ioannis Kapodistrias (known as Giovanni, Count Capo d'Istria), himself a Greek, to disavow any Russian sympathy with Ypsilantis; and in 1822, he issued orders that a deputation from the Greek Morea province to the Congress of Verona be turned back on the road.

He made some effort to reconcile his loyalties. The Ottoman Sultan Mahmud II had been excluded from the Holy Alliance under the principle that the affairs of the East were the "domestic concerns of Russia" rather than of the concert of Europe; but Alexander now offered to surrender this claim and act in the East as "the mandatory of Europe", as Austria had acted in Naples, and so march as a Christian liberator into the Ottoman Empire.

Metternich opposed this, putting the Austrian-led balance of power (including the Ottoman Empire) above the interests of Christendom. This opened Alexander's eyes to the Austria's true attitude towards his ideals. Back in Russia, far from the fascination of Metternich's personality, he was once again moved by the aspirations of his people, and Russian policy swung toward the Greek cause.

In 1823 the 1817–1824 cholera pandemic reached Astrakhan, and the Tsar ordered an anti-cholera campaign that was imitated in other countries.

== Personal life ==
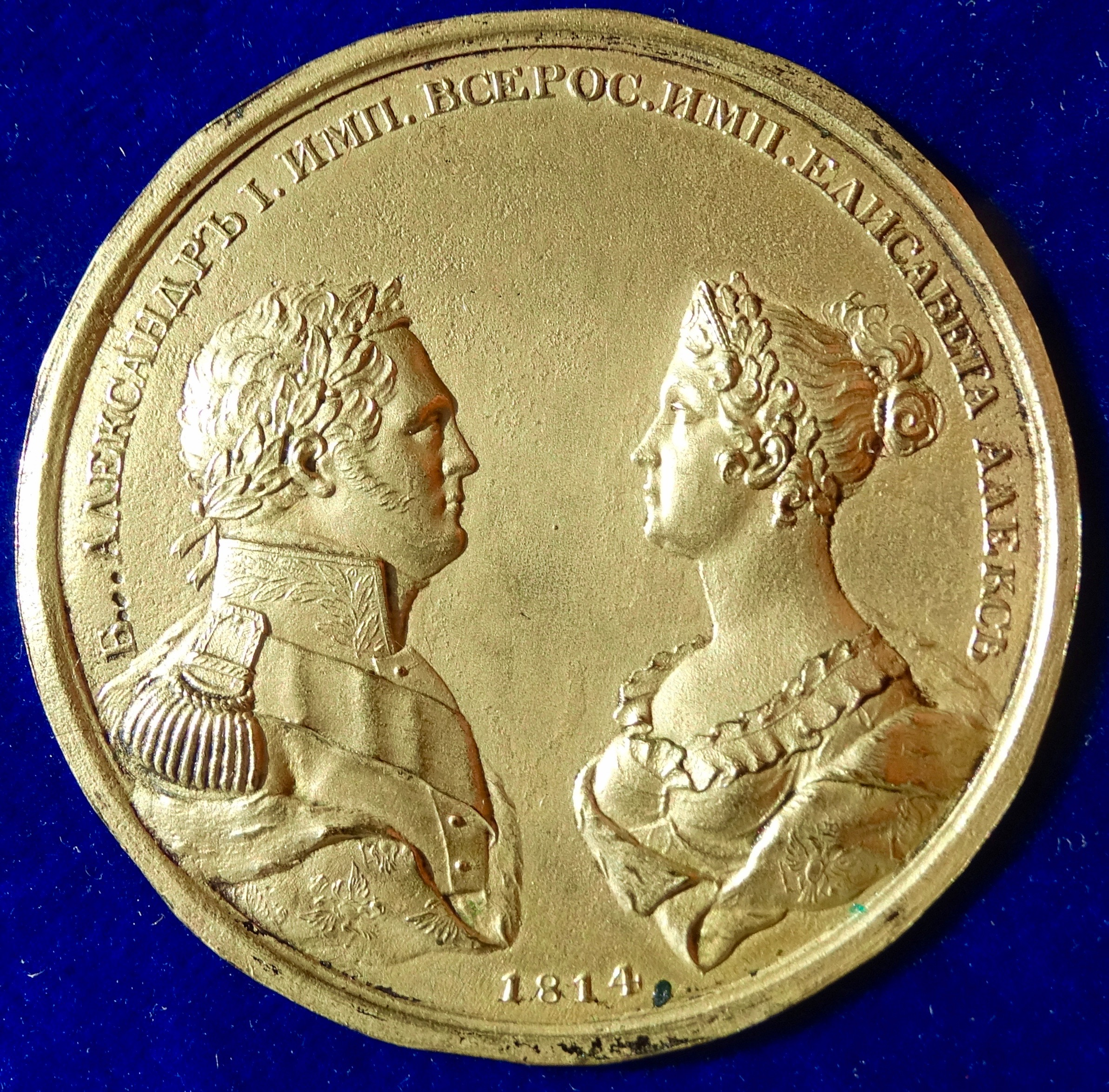
Elizabeth Alexeievna with Alexander at the Congress of Vienna 1814 Cliche´- Medal by Leopold Heuberger

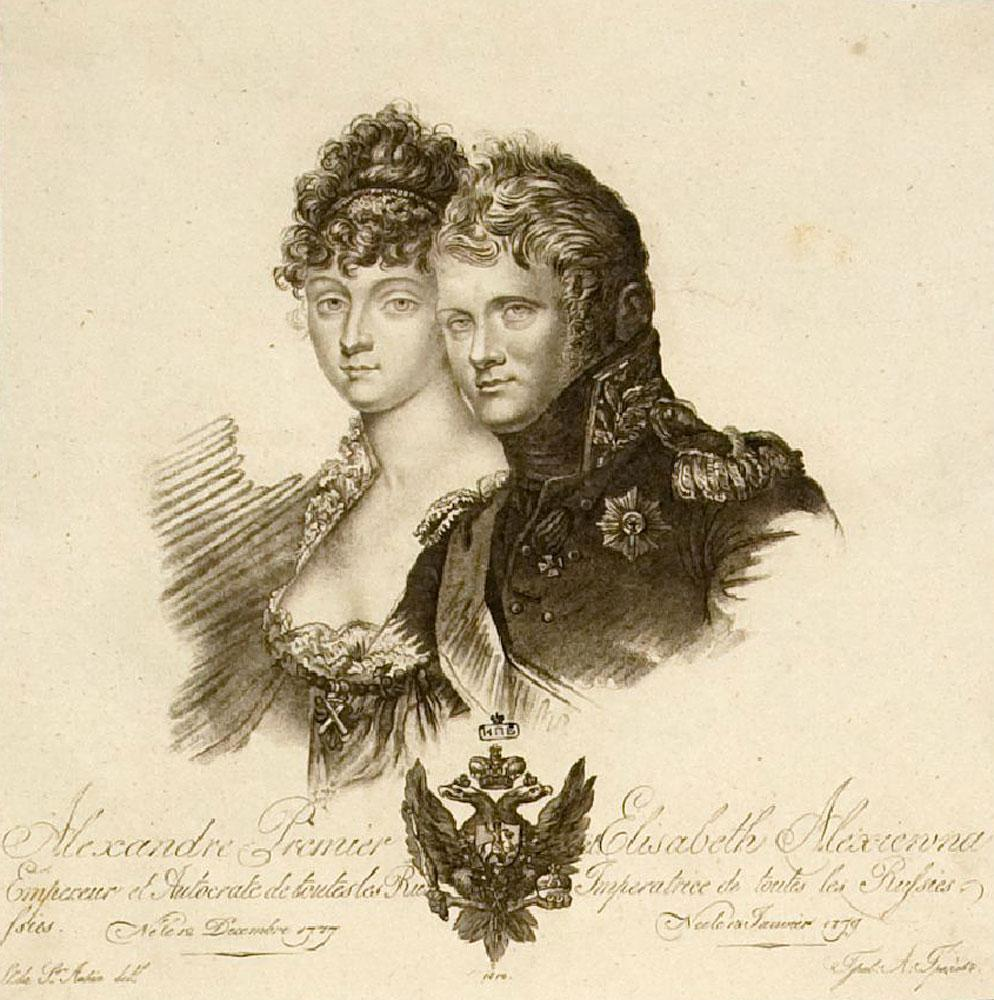
Alexander and Louise of Baden

On 9 October 1793, Alexander married Louise of Baden, known as Elizabeth Alexeievna after her conversion to the Orthodox Church. He later told his friend Frederick William III that the marriage, a political match devised by his grandmother, Catherine the Great, regrettably proved to be a misfortune for him and his spouse. Their two children died young, though their common sorrow drew the spouses closer together. After a relationship with his mistress Maria Naryshkina from 1799 until 1818, Alexander suffered the death of their beloved daughter Sophia Naryshkina, and the Empress' generous sympathy for his grief strengthened their marital bond.

In 1809, he was widely rumoured to have had an affair with the Finnish noblewoman Ulla Möllersvärd and to have had a child by her, but this is not confirmed.

== Death ==
With his mind deteriorating, Alexander grew increasingly suspicious, withdrawn, religious, and less active. Some historians conclude that his profile "coincides precisely with the schizophrenic prototype: a withdrawn, seclusive, rather shy, introvertive, unaggressive, and somewhat apathetic individual". In the autumn of 1825 the Emperor undertook a voyage to the south of Russia due to the increasing illness of his wife. During his trip he himself caught typhus, from which he died in the southern city of Taganrog on 19 November 1825 (Old Style). However, news of his death did not reach the capital until December. His two brothers disputed who would become tsar—each wanted the other to do so. His wife died a few months later as the emperor's body was transported to Saint Petersburg for the funeral. He was interred at the Saints Peter and Paul Cathedral of the Peter and Paul Fortress in Saint Petersburg on 13 March 1826.

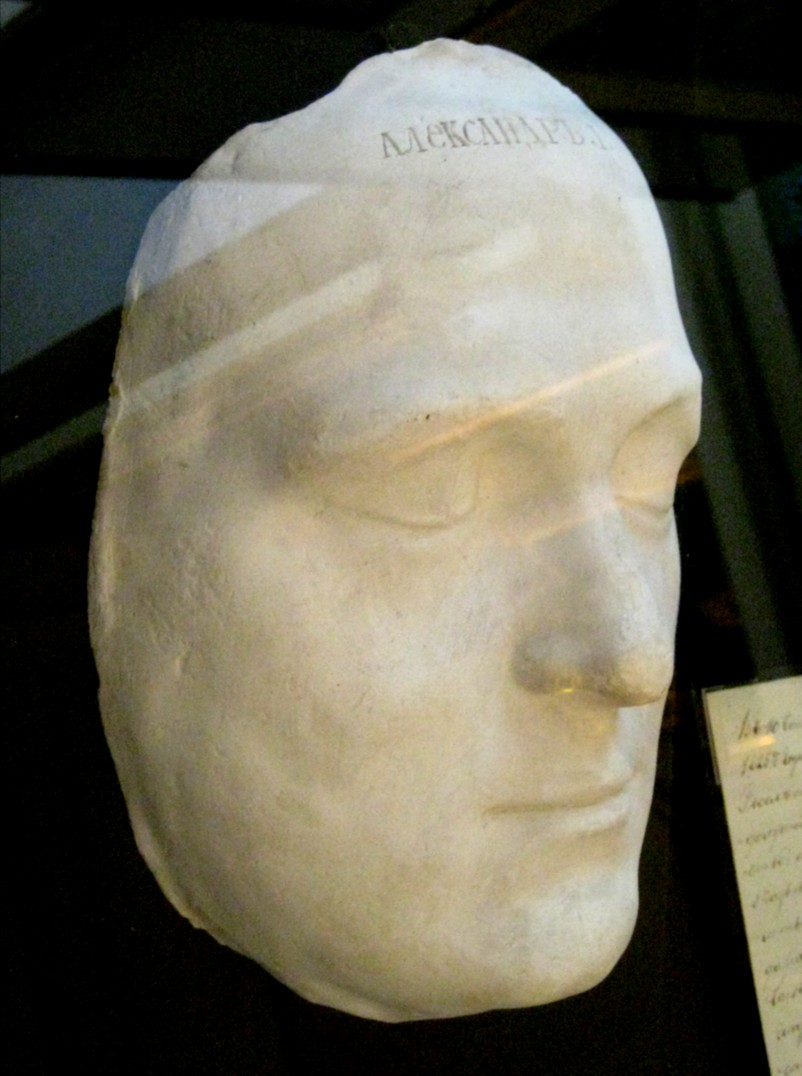
Death mask of Alexander I

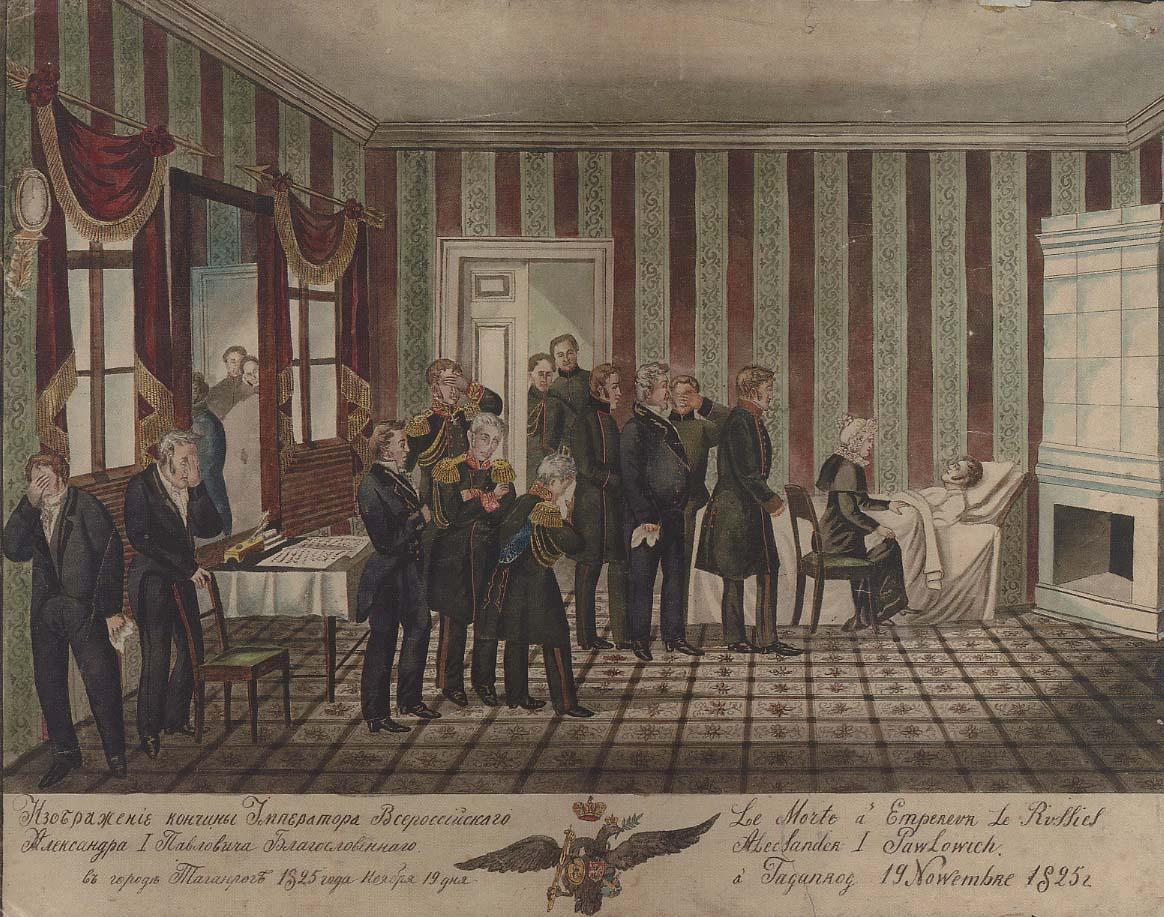
Death of Alexander I in Taganrog (19th century lithograph)

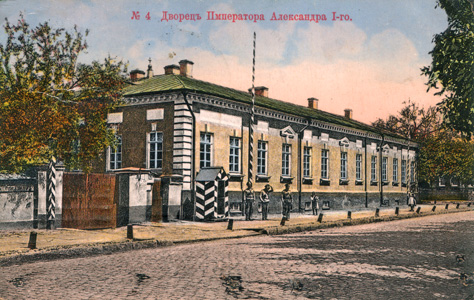
Alexander I Palace in Taganrog, where the emperor died in 1825

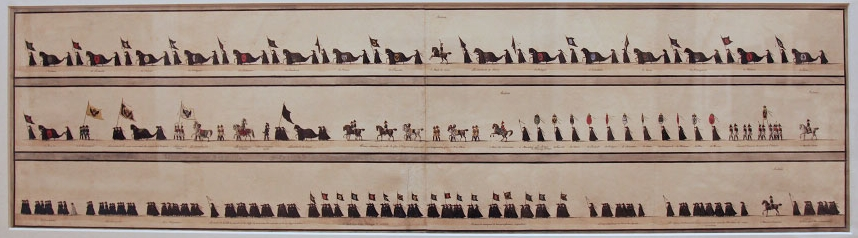
The funeral procession from Taganrog to St. Petersburg

=== Legend of survival ===
A popular legend has it that Tsar Alexander faked his death and lived as a hermit under the name Feodor Kuzmich, a theory often resurrected by popular writers. The theory involves the curious similarities between Alexander and Kuzmich. Svetlana Semyonova, president of the Russian Graphological Society, judged Alexander's and Kuzmich's handwriting to be identical. The priest attending Feodor Kuzmich on his deathbed reportedly asked him if he was, in fact, Alexander the Blessed. In response, Kuzmich said, "Your works are wonderful, Lord ... There is no secret which is not opened."

== Legacy ==
The legacy of Alexander I was shaped by Russia’s emergence as one of the principal powers of nineteenth-century Europe, his role in the defeat of Napoleon Bonaparte, and the contradiction between his early reforming ambitions and the preservation of autocratic government. His reign witnessed significant developments in education, public administration, imperial expansion and international diplomacy, but it did not produce a constitutional monarchy in Russia or the general abolition of serfdom. His later policies also contributed to the emergence of conservative political thought, as well as organized opposition to autocracy. Historians consequently regard Alexander as a complex and often contradictory ruler whose achievements in foreign policy were not matched by equally far-reaching domestic reforms.

=== Domestic reforms ===
Alexander’s early reign encouraged expectations of political and administrative reform. Influenced by Enlightenment thought and the political education he had received under the supervision of his grandmother, Catherine II, and the Swiss tutor Frédéric-César de La Harpe, he initially expressed interest in improving the legal and administrative institutions of the Russian Empire. His government reorganized the central administration, establishing ministerial departments in 1802 and creating the State Council in 1810. These measures contributed to the development of a more structured and specialized imperial bureaucracy.

The statesman Count Mikhail Speransky became the central figure of the reformist movement. His proposals sought to systematize Russian law, clarify the organization of government and introduce representative elements into the political system. Although some administrative changes were implemented, the more ambitious proposals were not fully realized. Alexander did not establish a national parliament or introduce a constitution for the Russian Empire, and the emperor retained ultimate authority over the state.

Education was among the areas in which Alexander’s early policies had a lasting institutional influence. In 1802, the government established a Ministry of Public Education and organized the country into educational districts responsible for coordinating schools and universities. These measures extended earlier imperial initiatives and reflected the belief that education could promote the intellectual and material development of Russian society. Historian Franklin A. Walker argues, however, that the educational reforms also illustrate the changing character of Alexander’s government: whereas educational expansion initially reflected Enlightenment aspirations, the post-Napoleonic period brought a stronger emphasis on religious instruction, obedience and political loyalty.

The limitations of Alexander’s domestic reforms were particularly evident in the persistence of serfdom. Although his government permitted certain forms of peasant emancipation and explored proposals for broader changes, it did not dismantle the system that bound much of the rural population to landowners. The failure to resolve the problem left one of the Russian Empire’s most consequential social and economic institutions intact. The contradiction between administrative modernization and the preservation of the existing social hierarchy remained an important feature of Russian political life well beyond Alexander’s reign, with the Russian Empire becoming one of the most backward European countries regarding political and social emancipation, as well as regarding the standard of living and industrialization.

=== Defeat of Napoleon and Russia’s international position ===
Alexander’s most prominent historical achievement was his role in the defeat of Napoleon and the subsequent expansion of Russian influence in European affairs. Following several years of conflict and shifting alliances, the French invasion of Russia in 1812 became the decisive turning point in the Napoleonic Wars. Russian resistance, the retreat of Napoleon’s Grande Armée and the subsequent campaigns of 1813-1814 culminated in the occupation of Paris by allied forces in 1814. Alexander played a substantial role in directing Russian strategy and diplomacy during these campaigns. Historian Dominic Lieven has challenged interpretations that minimize the Russian government’s strategic contribution, emphasizing the importance of Alexander’s leadership in the successful prosecution of the war.

The victory substantially enhanced Russia’s international prestige. Alexander participated prominently in the Congress of Vienna, where the victorious powers negotiated a new European political settlement after the Napoleonic Wars. His government sought to preserve the continental balance of power, prevent another French attempt for European hegemony and maintain cooperation among the major monarchies. Russia consequently became a central participant in the diplomatic arrangements that shaped European politics during the first half of the nineteenth century.

Alexander also promoted the Holy Alliance, signed in 1815 by Russia, Austria and Prussia. The alliance expressed a vision of international order based on Christian principles, dynastic solidarity and cooperation among rulers. Its historical interpretation remains contested. Some scholars emphasize its aspirations for peace and international cooperation, while others stress its association with conservative opposition to revolutionary movements and challenges to established monarchies. Adrian Brisku’s study of the alliance argues that it combined elements of religious idealism, conservative politics and proposals for a more durable European order.

=== Imperial expansion and the status of Finland and Poland ===
Alexander’s reign also altered the territorial and constitutional structure of the Russian Empire. The incorporation of Finland in 1809, following the Finnish War against Sweden, created the autonomous Grand Duchy of Finland under the Russian emperor. Finland retained a distinct institutional position within the empire, and its separate administrative and legal arrangements became important foundations for its subsequent development. Scholarship on Finnish constitutional history has emphasized the lasting significance of the commitments made by Alexander in 1809 and the institutional framework established under Russian rule.

The settlement reached at the Congress of Vienna also brought most of the former Duchy of Warsaw under Russian sovereignty. In 1815, Alexander became king of the newly established Kingdom of Poland and granted it a constitution that provided for representative institutions and a degree of political autonomy. This arrangement contrasted with the autocratic political system in Russia itself. However, the kingdom remained subordinate to the Russian monarch, and the constitutional framework did not fulfill Polish aspirations for complete national independence and a solely personal union with the Russian Emperor. The Polish settlement thus illustrated both Alexander’s willingness to experiment with constitutional government in certain imperial territories and the limits imposed by Russian strategic and dynastic interests.

Emperor Nicholas II attending the inauguration of the Alexander I Monument in Chișinău, Bessarabia Governorate (present-day Moldova), to mark 100 years since the Russian annexation of Bessarabia. It was demolished in 1918, after the union of Bessarabia with Romania.

Alexander I’s reign had a lasting impact on the territory of present-day Moldova through the annexation of Bessarabia in 1812. Under the Treaty of Bucharest, which ended the Russo-Turkish War of 1806-1812, the Russian Empire acquired the territory between the Prut and Dniester rivers from the Principality of Moldavia, incorporating much of present-day Moldova and parts of modern Ukraine. The annexation divided historical Moldavia and established a political and administrative separation whose consequences influenced the subsequent development of Romanian and Moldovan identities, as well as competing Russian and Romanian claims to the region. Under Alexander, Bessarabia initially received a degree of administrative autonomy within the Russian Empire, formalized in 1818, although this autonomy was ended by his successor, Nicholas I. The annexation therefore represents an important early stage in the historical processes that shaped modern Moldova, although the country’s later development was also determined by subsequent Russian, Romanian, and Soviet rule. A statue of Alexander I was inaugurated in Kishinev (present-day Chișinău) on June 3, 1914, with the notable attendance of Tsar Nicholas II of Russia and the imperial family, to mark 100 years since the Russian annexation of Bessarabia. The statue was demolished in 1918, after the union of Bessarabia with Romania. Alexander I still enjoys a positive reputation among the pro-Russian sectors of the Moldovan population. In 2013, the then Governor of Gagauzia, Mihail Formuzal, proposed the construction of a monument of Alexander I in Ceadîr-Lunga, as a sign of gratitude from the Gagauz people to the Tsar for the privileges given to them during his rule. In 2021, the pro-Russian Party of Socialists of the Republic of Moldova also proposed the construction of a statue of Alexander I in Bălți, because the monarch granted Bălți city status, which led to its development. However, neither of these initiatives materialized.

=== Conservatism and the emergence of political opposition ===
The later years of Alexander’s reign were marked by a movement away from the reforming atmosphere of the early 1800s. The experience of the Napoleonic Wars, fears of revolution and the growth of conservative religious convictions contributed to a more restrictive political climate. Educational institutions came under increased ideological supervision and repression, and the government placed greater emphasis on religious conformity and unconditional loyalty to the monarchy. Walker’s research identifies this shift as a significant break with the earlier educational programme, demonstrating how institutions initially associated with Enlightenment reform were increasingly expected to reinforce established authority.

The period also witnessed the development of military settlements, particularly under the influence of Count Aleksey Arakcheyev. These settlements sought to combine agricultural production with military service and reduce the costs of maintaining the army. Their practical consequences included burdensome discipline and resistance among affected populations. Together with the preservation of autocracy and serfdom, these policies contributed to the increasingly contradictory reputation of Alexander’s government.

One of the most important political consequences of the reign was the emergence of the Decembrist movement. Officers who served in the European campaigns against Napoleon encountered political ideas and institutions different from those of imperial Russia. Some subsequently founded secret societies that advocated constitutional government, the abolition of serfdom or more radical changes to the political system. Following Alexander’s death in 1825 and the ensuing succession crisis, a group of officers staged an unsuccessful uprising against the accession of Nicholas I. The Decembrist revolt took place after Alexander’s death, and its participants differed substantially in their political objectives. Nevertheless, the movement developed during the final years of his reign and reflected dissatisfaction among sections of the educated military elite with the absence of fundamental political reform. Historian Marc Raeff’s work on the Decembrists situates the movement within the broader evolution of Russian political and philosophical thought. Its emergence demonstrated that the same imperial institutions that had enabled Russia to participate in European affairs also exposed sections of Russian society to ideas that challenged autocratic rule.

=== Cultural and intellectual legacy ===
Alexander’s reign contributed to the intellectual and institutional developments that helped shape nineteenth-century Russian culture. The expansion of educational administration, the establishment and development of universities, and the circulation of European philosophical and political ideas fostered an increasingly educated segment of society. Although the government later restricted aspects of this intellectual life, the institutions and debates of the period formed part of the environment in which Russian literature and political thought developed during the nineteenth century.

Nicholas V. Riasanovsky, in his study of Russian national identity, presents Alexander’s reign as an important stage in the evolution of the Russian Enlightenment and emphasizes its connections with subsequent cultural developments, including the emergence of the period traditionally known as the Golden Age of Russian literature. Alexander’s cultural legacy was thus not limited to individual reforms: it also involved the creation of institutions and intellectual circumstances that continued to influence Russian society after his death.

== Children ==
Children of Alexander I of Russia.
Name	Birth	Death	Notes
By his wife Louise of Baden
Maria/Maryia Alexandrovna, Grand Duchess of Russia	18/29 May 1799	27 July / 8 August 1800	Sometimes rumoured to be the child of Adam Czartoryski, died aged one.
Elisabeta/Elisaveta Alexandrovna, Grand Duchess of Russia	15 November 1806	12 May 1808	Sometimes rumoured to be the child of Alexei Okhotnikov, died aged one of an infection.
By Maria Naryshkina
Zinaida Naryshkina	c. 19 December 1807	18 June 1810	Died aged four.
Sophia Naryshkina	1 October 1805	18 June 1824	Died aged eighteen, unmarried.
Emanuel Naryshkin	30 July 1813	31 December 1901/13 January 1902	Married Catherine Novossiltzev, no issue. *unconfirmed and disputed

== Archives ==
Alexander's letters to his grandfather, Frederick II Eugene, Duke of Württemberg, (together with letters from his siblings) written between 1795 and 1797, are preserved in the State Archive of Stuttgart (Hauptstaatsarchiv Stuttgart) in Stuttgart, Germany.

== Honours ==
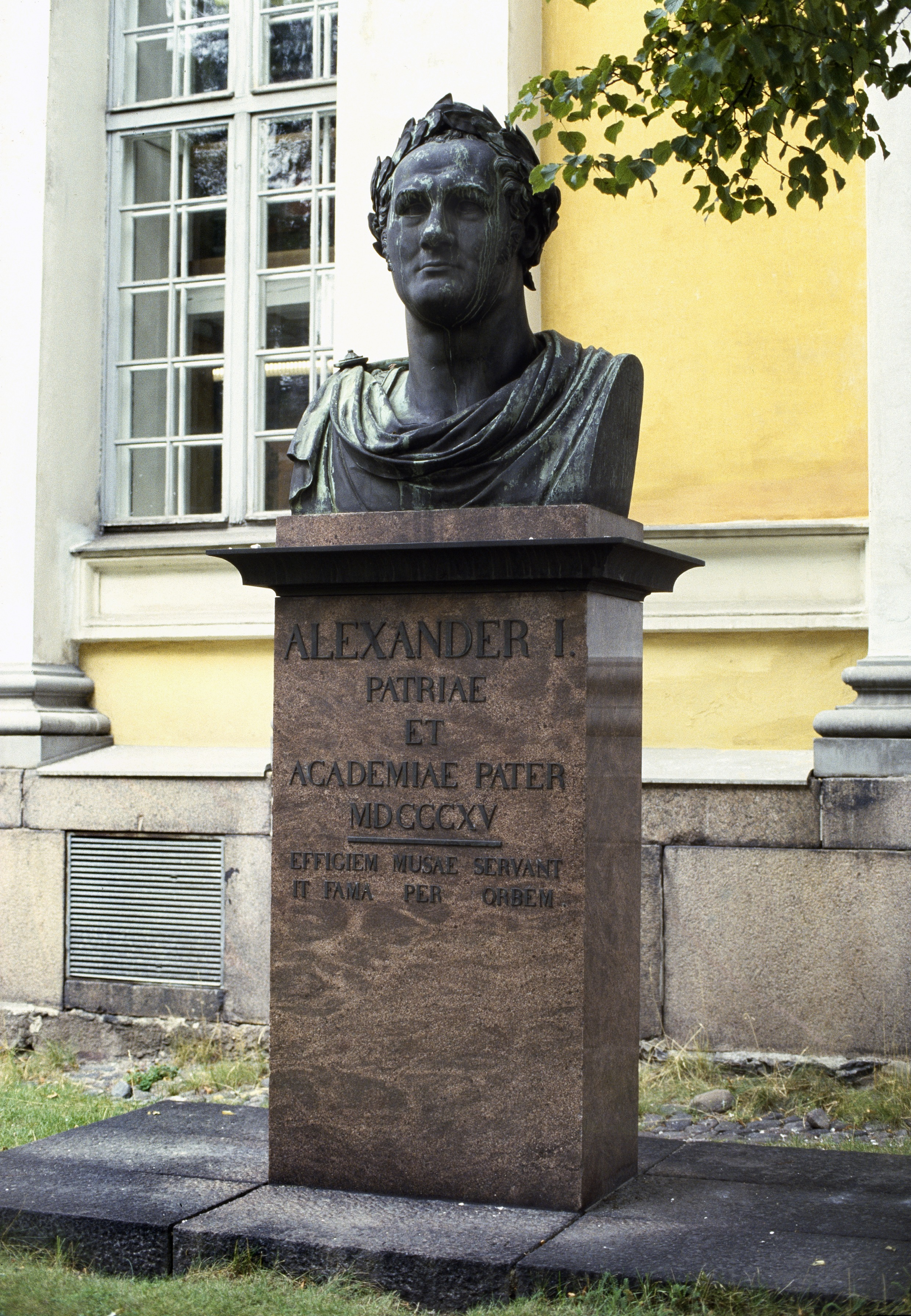
The bust of Alexander I at the yard of University of Helsinki in 1986

He received the following orders and decorations:

- Russian Empire:
  - Knight of St. Andrew
  - Knight of Saint Alexander Nevsky
  - Knight of St. Anna, 1st Class
  - Grand Cross of the Order of Saint John of Jerusalem
- Sweden:
  - Knight of the Seraphim, 16 November 1799
  - Grand Cross of the Sword, 1st Class, 15 January 1814
- Kingdom of Prussia:
  - Knight of the Black Eagle, 30 November 1779
  - Iron Cross (1813) 2nd Class
- Two Sicilies: Knight of St. Januarius, 1800
- France:
  - French Empire: Grand Eagle of the Legion of Honour, 7 July 1807
  - Kingdom of France:
    - Grand Cross of the Legion of Honour, 1815
    - Knight of the Holy Spirit, 1815
- Denmark: Knight of the Elephant, 2 July 1808
- United Kingdom: Stranger Knight of the Garter, 27 July 1813
- Kingdom of Bavaria: Knight of St. Hubert, 1813
- Spain: Knight of the Golden Fleece, 30 May 1814
- Austrian Empire: Knight of the Military Order of Maria Theresa, 1815
- Netherlands: Grand Cross of the Military William Order, 19 November 1818
- Kingdom of Sardinia: Knight of the Annunciation, 5 November 1822
- Kingdom of Portugal: Grand Cross of the Sash of the Three Orders, 10 February 1824
- Saxe-Weimar-Eisenach: Grand Cross of the White Falcon

== In popular culture ==
=== Film ===
- In silent Soviet historical drama film The Decembrists (1927) Alexander is portrayed by Vladimir Maksimov.
- In silent German historical film Queen Louise (1927) Alexander is portrayed by Egon von Jordan.
- In American semi-biographical sound part-talkie film The Patriot (1928) Alexander is portrayed by Neil Hamilton.
- In silent German historical film Napoleon at Saint Helena (1929) Alexander is portrayed by Alfred Gerasch.
- In German historical drama film Louise, Queen of Prussia (1931) Alexander is portrayed by Vladimir Gajdarov.
- In German historical war film Marshal Forwards (1932) Alexander is portrayed by Carl Auen.
- In British historical film The Iron Duke (1934) Alexander is portrayed by Gyles Isham.
- In German historical comedy film The Night With the Emperor (1936) Alexander is portrayed by Otto Wögerer.
- In German historical romance film A Prussian Love Story (1938) Alexander is portrayed by Curt Breitkopf.
- In French historical drama film The Patriot (1938) Alexander is portrayed by Gérard Landry.
- In Soviet drama film Kutuzov (1943) Alexander is portrayed by Nicholas Timchenko.
- In Soviet biographical war film Attack from the Sea (1953) Alexander is portrayed by Mikhail Nazvanov.
- In French historical epic drama film Napoléon (1955) Alexander is portrayed by Constantin Nepo.
- In American-Italian epic historical drama film War and Peace (1956) Alexander is portrayed by Savo Raskovitch.
- In West German historical drama film Queen Louise (1957) Alexander is portrayed by Bernhard Wicki.
- In German-French historical romance film Die schöne Lügnerin (1959) Alexander is portrayed by Jean-Claude Pascal.
- In French historical drama film Austerlitz (1960) Alexander is portrayed by Jean-Louis Richard.
- In Soviet epic war drama film War and Peace (1965-1967) Alexander is portrayed by Viktor Murganov.
- In Austrian-French historical comedy film Congress of Love (1966) Alexander is portrayed by Curd Jürgens.
- In Soviet historical romance film The Star of Captivating Happiness (1975) Alexander is portrayed by Boris Dubensky.
- In Soviet comedy drama The Left-Hander (1987) Alexander is portrayed by Leonid Kuravlyov.
- In Russian historical drama film Poor Poor Paul (2003) Alexander is portrayed by Alexey Barabash.
- In Russian historical adventure film The Ballad of Uhlans (2012) Alexander is portrayed by Dimitri Isayev.
- In Russian historical drama film Vasilisa (2014) Alexander is portrayed by Alexey Barabash.
- In Russian war epic period adventure film Union of Salvation (2019) Alexander is portrayed by Vitali Kishchenko.
- In American epic historical war film Napoleon (2023) Alexander is portrayed by Édouard Philipponnat.

=== Television ===
- In British series Napoleon and Love (1974) Alexander is portrayed by Jonathan Newth.
- In French miniseries Joséphine ou la Comédie des ambitions (1979) Alexander is portrayed by Féodor Atkine.
- In French series Napoleon (French: Napoléon et l'Europe)(1991) Alexander is portrayed by Andrzej Seweryn.
- In French-Canadian miniseries Napoléon (2002) Alexander is portrayed by Toby Stephens.
- In Russian historical telenovela Aide-de-camps of Love (2005) Alexander is portrayed by Alexander Efimov.
- In American-British historical miniseries Catherine the Great (2019) Alexander appears as young man and is portrayed by Felix Jamieson.
- In Russian war epic period adventure series Union of Salvation: Time of Wrath (2022) Alexander is portrayed by Vitali Kishchenko. The series give more detailed scope of the events presented in the 2019 film .
- In Russian historical drama series Alexander I (2025) Alexander is portrayed by Evgeny Romantsov.

==== War and Peace adaptations ====
- In British Play of the Week drama anthology series in the episode War and Peace (1963) Alexander is portrayed by Tim Pearce.
- In British television dramatisation War and Peace (1972) Alexander is portrayed by Donald Douglas.
- In French-Italian drama miniseries War and Peace (2007) Alexander is portrayed by Igor Kostolevsky.
- In British historical drama television serial War and Peace (2016) Alexander is portrayed by Ben Lloyd-Hughes.

=== Theatre and Music ===
- Alexander has a silent role in War and Peace opera by Sergei Prokofiev.
- In 1988 Japanese musical production War and Peace by Takarazuka Revue Alexander was played by You Akira, Uzuki Kei and Minoru Kou.
- In 2014 Japanese musical production Napoleon: The Man Who Never Sleeps by Takarazuka Revue Alexander was played by Mao Yuuki and Sazanami Reira.
- In 2018 production Napoleon by Stanley Kubrick (The Greatest Movie Never Made) adapted from Stanley Kubrick’s screenplay for stage Alexander was played by Bart Philly.

== Ancestry ==
Ancestors of Alexander I of Russia

8. Charles Frederick, Duke of Holstein-Gottorp
4. Peter III of Russia
9. Grand Duchess Anna Petrovna of Russia
2. Paul I of Russia
10. Christian August, Prince of Anhalt-Zerbst
5. Catherine II of Russia
11. Duchess Joanna Elisabeth of Holstein-Gottorp
1. Alexander I of Russia
12. Charles Alexander, Duke of Württemberg
6. Frederick II Eugene, Duke of Württemberg
13. Princess Marie Auguste of Thurn and Taxis
3. Duchess Sophie Dorothea of Württemberg
14. Frederick William, Margrave of Brandenburg-Schwedt
7. Princess Friederike of Brandenburg-Schwedt
15. Princess Sophia Dorothea of Prussia

== See also ==
- Aleksey Arakcheyev
- Archimandrite Photius

== Bibliography ==
- Avery, Peter; Fisher, William Bayne; Hambly, Gavin; Melville, Charles (1991). The Cambridge history of Iran: From Nadir Shah to the Islamic Republic. Cambridge University Press. p. 332. ISBN 978-0-521-20095-0.
- Baddeley, John F. (1908). The Russian Conquest of the Caucasus. London: Longmans, Green and Company. p. 67.
- Berlin, A. (1768). "Table 23". Généalogie ascendante jusqu'au quatrième degré inclusivement de tous les Rois et Princes de maisons souveraines de l'Europe actuellement vivants [Genealogy up to the fourth degree inclusive of all the Kings and Princes of sovereign houses of Europe currently living] (in French). Bordeaux: Frédéric Guillaume Birnstiel. p. 22.
- Chapman, Tim (2001). Imperial Russia, 1801–1905 (Illustrated, reprint ed.). Routledge. p. 29. ISBN 978-0-415-23110-7.
- Cox, Robert W. (1987). Production, Power, and World Order: Social Forces in the Making of History. Columbia University Press. p. 121.
- Esdaile, Charles (2009). Napoleon's Wars: An International History. Penguin. pp. 192–193.
- Flynn, James T. (1988). University Reform of Tsar Alexander I, 1802–1835. Catholic University of America Press. ISBN 0-8132-0653-7.
- "Jefferson to Priestley, Washington, 29 November 1802". The Thomas Jefferson Papers Series 1. General Correspondence. 1651–1827. Library of Congress.
- Kazemzadeh, Firuz (2013). Russia and Britain in Persia: Imperial Ambitions in Qajar Iran. I.B. Tauris. p. 5. ISBN 978-0-85772-173-0.
- Lipscomb, Andrew Adgate; Bergh, Albert Ellery; Johnston, Richard Holland, eds. (1903). "Jefferson to Harris, Washington, 18 April 1806". The Writings of Thomas Jefferson. Issued under the auspices of the Thomas Jefferson memorial association of the United States.
- Lieven, Dominic (2006). "Review article: Russia and the defeat of Napoleon". Kritika: Explorations in Russian and Eurasian History. 7 (2): 283–308. doi:10.1353/kri.2006.0020. S2CID 159982703.
- Mäkelä-Alitalo, Anneli (5 May 2006) [10 November 2005]. "Möllersvärd, Ulrika (1791–1878)". kansallisbiografia (National Biography of Finland). ISSN 1799-4349.
- Maude, Frederic Natusch (1911). "Napoleonic Campaigns § The Allies March on Paris" . In Chisholm, Hugh (ed.). Encyclopædia Britannica. Vol. 19 (11th ed.). Cambridge University Press. p. 223.
- Maiorova, Olga (2010). From the Shadow of Empire: Defining the Russian Nation through Cultural Mythology, 1855–1870. University of Wisconsin Press. p. 114.
- Mansoori, Firooz (2008). "17". Studies in History, Language and Culture of Azerbaijan (in Persian). Tehran: Hazar-e Kerman. p. 245. ISBN 978-600-90271-1-8.
- McCaffray, Susan P. (2005). "Confronting Serfdom in the Age of Revolution: Projects for Serf Reform in the Time of Alexander I". Russian Review. 64 (1): 1–21. doi:10.1111/j.1467-9434.2005.00344.x. JSTOR 3664324.
- McGrew, R. E. (1992). Paul I of Russia: 1754–1801. Oxford: Oxford University Press. ISBN 978-0-19822-567-6.
- McNaughton, C. Arnold (1973). The Book of Kings: A Royal Genealogy, in 3 volumes. Vol. 1. London: Garnstone Press. pp. 293–306.
- Mikaberidze, Alexander (2013). Russian Eyewitness Accounts of the Campaign of 1814. Frontline Books. p. 225. ISBN 978-1-84832-707-8.
- Mikhailovsky-Danilevsky, Alexander (1839). History of the Campaign in France: In the Year 1814. Smith, Elder, and Company. pp. 347–372.
- Montefiore, Simon Sebag (2016). The Romanovs 1613–1918. Orion Publishing Group Ltd. ISBN 978-0-297-85266-7.
- Nichols, Irby C. (1982). "Tsar Alexander I: Pacifist, Aggressor, or Vacillator?". East European Quarterly. 16 (1): 33–44.
- Nolan, Cathal J. (2002). The Greenwood Encyclopedia of International Relations: S-Z. The Greenwood Encyclopedia of International Relations, Cathal. Vol. 4 (illustrated ed.). Greenwood Publishing Group. p. 1666. ISBN 978-0-313-32383-6.
- Olivier, Daria (19 December 2019). "Alexander I | Emperor of Russia". Encyclopedia Britannica.
- Palmer, Alan (1974). Alexander I: Tsar of War and Peace. New York: Harper and Row. ISBN 978-0060132644.
- Raleigh, Donald J., ed. (1996). The Emperors and Empresses of Russia: Rediscovering the Romanovs. M.E. Sharpe. p. 252.
- Sebag Montefiore, Simon (2016). The Romanovs: 1613–1918. Knopf Doubleday Publishing Group.
- "Annexation of Georgia in Russia Empire (1801–1878)". Tedsnet. Archived from the original on 16 August 2022.
- Truscott, Peter (1997). Russia First: Breaking with the West. I.B. Tauris. p. 26.
- Walker, Franklin A (1992). "Enlightenment and Religion in Russian Education in the Reign of Tsar Alexander I". History of Education Quarterly. 32 (3): 343–360. doi:10.2307/368549. JSTOR 368549. S2CID 147173682.
- Yemelianova, Galina (26 April 2014). "Islam, nationalism and state in the Muslim Caucasus". Caucasus Survey. 1 (2): 3–23. doi:10.1080/23761199.2014.11417291. S2CID 128432463. Archived from the original on 26 April 2014.
- Zawadzki, Hubert (2009). "Between Napoleon and Tsar Alexander: The Polish Question at Tilsit, 1807". Central Europe. 7 (2): 110–124. doi:10.1179/147909609X12490448067244. S2CID 145539723.

Attribution:

- This article incorporates text from a publication now in the public domain: Phillips, Walter Alison (1911). "Alexander I.". In Chisholm, Hugh (ed.). Encyclopædia Britannica. Vol. 1 (11th ed.). Cambridge University Press. pp. 556–559.

Alexander I of Russia House of Holstein-Gottorp-Romanov Cadet branch of the House of Oldenburg Born: 23 December 1777 Died: 1 December 1825
Regnal titles
Preceded by Paul I of Russia	Emperor of Russia; 23 March 1801 – 1 December 1825	Succeeded by Nicholas I of Russia
Preceded by Gustav IV Adolf of Sweden	Grand Duke of Finland; 1809 – 1825	Succeeded by Nicholas I of Russia
Preceded by Stanisław August Poniatowski	King of Poland; Grand Duke of Lithuania; 9 June 1815 – 1 December 1825	Succeeded by Nicholas I of Russia
