= Prosecutor General of the Russian Empire =

The prosecutor general was one of the highest government positions in the Russian Empire, the head of the Governing Senate, who oversaw the legality of the activities of government agencies.

== History ==
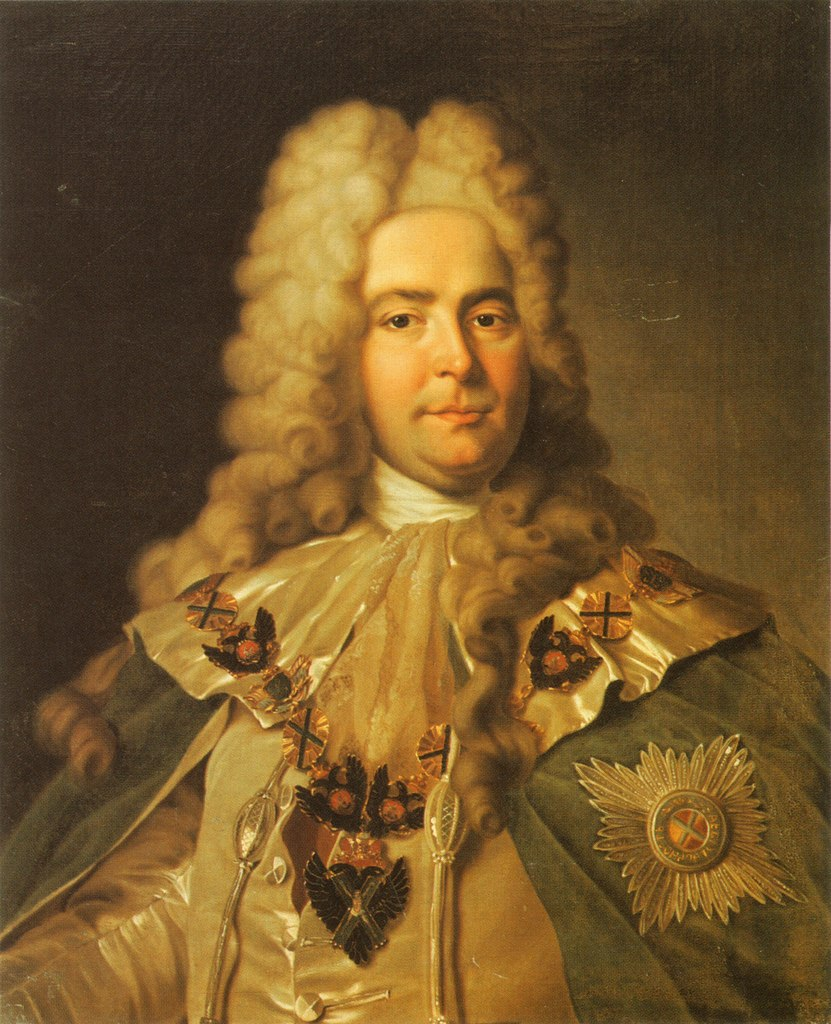
Pavel Yaguzhinsky – First Prosecutor General of Russia

The post of prosecutor general was established by Peter the Great on January 12, 1722. Its predecessor, but with lesser powers, was the post of auditor general, which existed in 1715–1718. The first prosecutor general was appointed Pavel Yaguzhinsky.

The prosecutor general was initially the head of the Senate office and was in charge of the Senate office work; at the same time, he headed the prosecutor's office, which consisted of a three-stage system of control over the Senate and all administrative and judicial institutions, both central and local. Assistant to the Prosecutor General in the Senate was the Chief Prosecutor. Control over the activities of the authorities was carried out through subordinates – prosecutors and fiscals.

The initial duties of the procurator-general included checking that the Senate decisions comply with the laws in force, as well as overseeing decency during meetings. The Prosecutor General was also a mediator in matters between the Senate and the sovereign. Supervision contributed to putting in order the production of cases both in the very presence of the Senate and in its office; the value of the Senate as an effective authority has grown. On the other hand, the establishment of the post of Prosecutor General deprived the Senate of its former relative independence; often, by law, equal to the entire Senate, the Prosecutor General in many cases actually prevailed over him.

After the death of Peter I, the value of the post fell along with the influence of the Senate itself: the Supreme Privy Council established on February 8, 1726, became the most powerful. Prosecutor General Yaguzhinsky was appointed a resident in Poland, and the post of Prosecutor General was effectively abolished; her nominal execution was entrusted to the Chief Prosecutor Voeikov, who had no influence in the Senate.

In March 1730, after the abolition of the Supreme Privy Council by Empress Anna Ioannovna, the Senate was restored to its authority, and in October it was deemed necessary to reinstate the position of prosecutor general; however, a year later, after the establishment of a new central authority – the Cabinet (consisting of three cabinet ministers) – the influence of the Senate fell again; no appointment has occurred. In the interregnum from the death of Anna Ioannovna to the accession of Elizabeth Petrovna, the role of the Senate began to increase; the post of Prosecutor General was reinstated; Prince Nikita Trubetskoy was appointed to it.

On December 12, 1741, shortly after taking the throne, Empress Elizaveta Petrovna issued a decree abolishing the Cabinet and restoring the Governing Senate; convenient prince Trubetskoy remained in his post and held this post almost all the time of the empress's reign, in his subordination was also the all-powerful Secret Office. All the prominent political courts of Elizabethan rule passed through his hands: the case of Andrey Osterman, Burkhard von Münnich in 1742; the case of Field Marshal Stepan Apraksin in 1757 and Chancellor Bestuzhev-Ryumin in 1758.

In 1762, Catherine the Great significantly reformed the Senate on her accession to the throne; Prince Alexander Vyazemsky was appointed to the post of Prosecutor General. He was among the special trustees of Catherine, she entrusted him with many complex cases. After some time, the duties of the Prosecutor General already included the management of justice, finance, the state treasury, and, as before, state supervision of the authorities. Like his predecessors in the post, he headed the body of political investigation – the Secret Expedition, the "heiress" of the Secret Chancellery. He supervised the investigation of Yemelyan Pugachev and other impostors (False Third Peters), Alexander Radishchev, publisher Nikolay Novikov and others. After his resignation in 1792, the duties of the Prosecutor General were distributed among several officials.

With the reform of public administration undertaken by Alexander I, since 1802, the position of the head of the Senate was combined with the position of minister of justice and acquired his final terms of reference: the prosecutor general was the head of the prosecutor's office and the office of the Senate and also enjoyed the right to supervise the activities of officials of the entire judicial department. Without significant changes, the post of Prosecutor General existed until the February Revolution of 1917.

== Prosecutors general by year ==
=== Prosecutors general, heads of the Governing Senate ===
- Pavel Yaguzhinsky: January 12, 1722 – April 6, 1735 (with a break in 1726–30);
- Nikita Trubetskoy: April 28, 1740 – August 15, 1760;
- Yakov Shakhovskoy: August 15, 1760 – December 25, 1761;
- Alexander Glebov: December 25, 1761 – February 3, 1764;
- Alexander Vyazemsky: February 3, 1764 – September 17, 1792;
- Alexander Samoylov: September 17, 1792 – December 4, 1796;
- Alexey Kurakin: December 4, 1796 – August 8, 1798;
- Peter Lopukhin: August 8, 1798 – July 7, 1799;
- Alexander Bekleshov: July 7, 1799 – February 2, 1800;
- Peter Obolyaninov: February 2, 1800 – March 16, 1801.

=== Prosecutors General, at the same time Ministers of Justice ===
- Gavriil Derzhavin: September 8, 1802 – October 7, 1803;
- Peter Lopukhin: October 8, 1803 – January 1, 1810;
- Ivan Dmitriev: January 1, 1810 – August 30, 1814;
- Dmitry Troschinsky: August 30, 1814 – August 25, 1817;
- Dmitry Lobanov-Rostovsky: August 25, 1817 – October 18, 1827;
- Alexey Dolgorukov: October 18, 1827 – September 20, 1829;
- Dmitry Dashkov: September 20, 1829 – February 14, 1839;
- Dmitry Bludov: February 15, 1839 – December 31, 1839;
- Victor Panin: December 31, 1839 – October 21, 1862;
- Dmitry Zamyatnin: October 21, 1862 – April 18, 1867;
- Sergey Urusov: April 18, 1867 – October 15, 1867;
- Konstantin Palen: October 15, 1867 – May 30, 1878;
- Dmitry Nabokov: May 30, 1878 – November 6, 1885;
- Nikolay Manasein: November 6, 1885 – January 1, 1894;
- Nikolay Muravyov: January 1, 1894 – January 14, 1905;
- Sergey Manukhin: January 21, 1905 – December 16, 1905;
- Mikhail Akimov: December 16, 1905 – April 24, 1906;
- Ivan Shcheglovitov: April 24, 1906 – July 6, 1915;
- Alexander Khvostov: July 6, 1915 – July 7, 1916;
- Alexander Makarov: July 7, 1916 – December 20, 1916;
- Nikolai Dobrovolsky: December 20, 1916 – March 13, 1917.

=== The Ministers of Justice of the Provisional Government, not at the same time Prosecutors General ===
- Alexander Kerensky: March 15, 1917 – May 18, 1917;
- Pavel Pereverzev: May 18, 1917 – July 19, 1917;
- Ivan Efremov: July 23, 1917 – August 6, 1917;
- Alexander Zarudny: August 7, 1917 – September 15, 1917;
- Alexander Demyanov: September 16, 1917 – October 8, 1917;
- Pavel Malyantovich: October 8, 1917 – November 7, 1917.

== Sources ==
- Prosecutor General // Brockhaus and Efron Encyclopedic Dictionary: in 86 Volumes (82 Volumes and 4 Additional) – Saint Petersburg, 1890–1907
- Gradovsky, "The Beginnings of Russian State Law" (Volume II, 1887); "The Highest Administration of Russia of the 18th Century and the Procurators General" (1866; included in the first volume of the "Collected Works" by Alexander Gradovsky, 1899);
- Korkunov, "Russian State Law" (Volume II);
- Korkunov, The Four Projects of Speransky (Herald of World History, 1900, № II and III);
- Korkunov, "Two Projects of Speransky's Transformation" ("Journal of the Ministry of Justice", 1899, Book V);
- Korkunov, "The Project of the Senate of Gavriil Derzhavin" ("Collection of Articles", Saint Petersburg, 1898);
- Korkunov, "The Project of the Judicial Arrangement of Mikhail Balugyansky" ("Collection of Articles", Saint Petersburg, 1898);
- Petrovsky, "On the Senate in the Reign of Peter the Great" (1875);
- Filippov, "History of the Senate to the Board of the Supreme Privy Council and the Cabinet" (Part I: "The Senate to the Board of the Supreme Privy Council", 1895);
- Filippov, "The Cabinet of Ministers and the Governing Senate in Their Mutual Relations" ("Collection of Jurisprudence and Public Knowledge"; Volume VII);
- Vladimir Shcheglov, "State Council in Russia" (1892);
- Vladimir Shcheglov, "The State Council in the Reign of Emperor Alexander I" (1895);
- "The Senate Archive" (Volumes I – VIII); "Journals of the Committee on December 6, 1826" ("Collection of the Imperial Historical Society", Volume LXXIV);
- "Papers of the Committee on December 6, 1826" ("Collection of the Imperial Historical Society", volume CS);
- Manuel Zeil, "The Governing Senate" (1898), "The Archives of the State Council" (Kalachov's Edition, Volume III);
- Nikolay Eroshkin, The History of State Institutions of Pre-Revolutionary Russia, 2nd edition, Moscow, 1968.
