= Governing Senate =

Government body in the Russian Empire

- Правительствующiй Сенатъ; Правительствующий Сенат

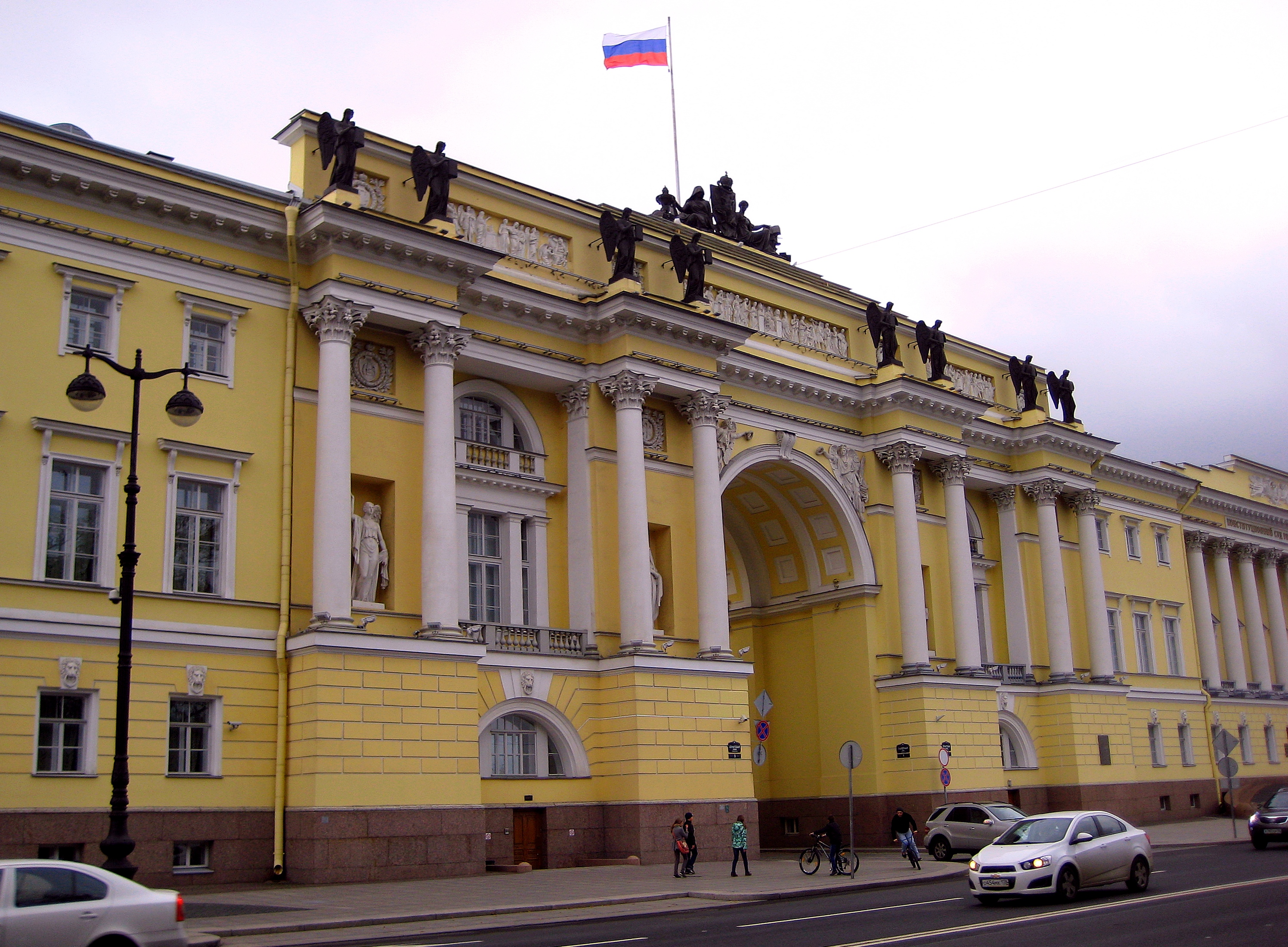
- Senate and Synod Building on Senate Square, Saint Petersburg

Agency overview
- Formed: 1711
- Preceding agency: Zemsky Sobor
- Dissolved: 1917
- Superseding agency: All-Russian Congress of Soviets
- Headquarters: Saint Petersburg
- Agency executive: Procurator General and Minister of Justice

From 1711 to 1917, the Governing Senate (Note: Russian: Правительствующiй Сенатъ, romanized: Pravitelstvuyushchiy Senat; Правительствующий сенат in modern Russian spelling.) was the highest legislative, judicial, and executive body subordinate to the Russian emperors. The senate was instituted by Peter the Great to replace the Boyar Duma and lasted until the very end of the Russian Empire. It was chaired by the Procurator General, who served as the link between the sovereign and the Senate; he acted, in the emperor's own words, as "the sovereign's eye".

== Description ==
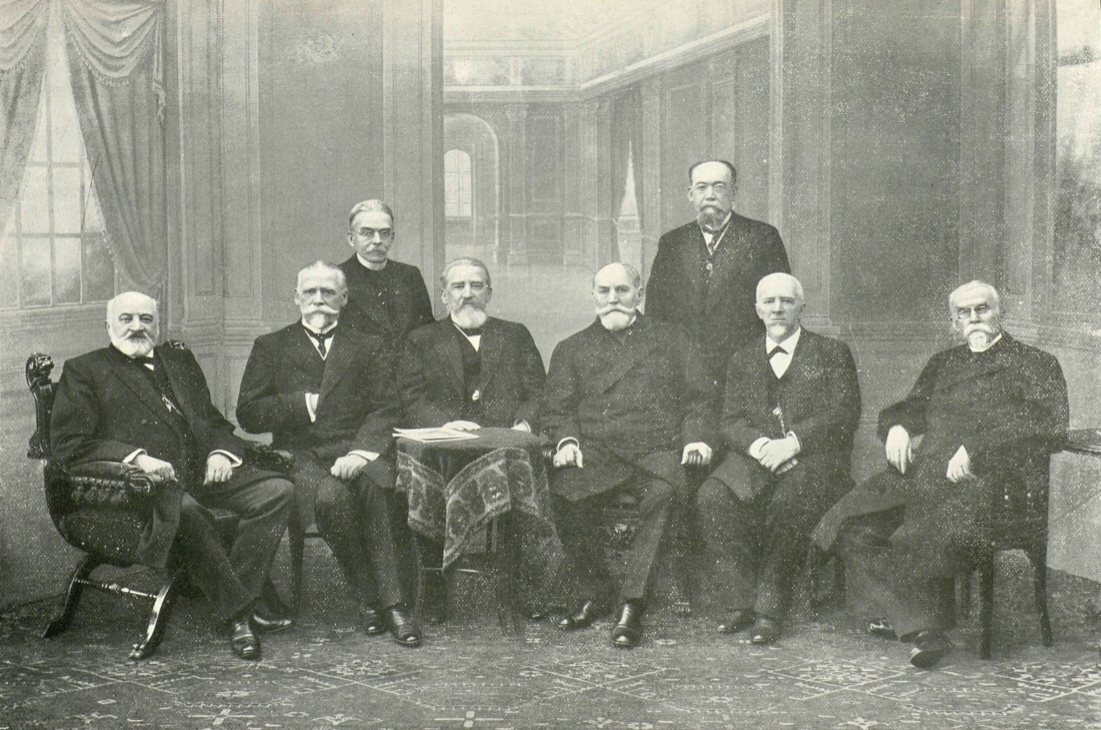
The Governing Senate in 1912.

The senate was created in February 1711 and initially established only for the time of Peter's absence on military campaign. However, on his return it was not dissolved but gradually became the chief legislative and executive organ of Imperial Russia.

The number of senators was first set at nine and, in 1712, increased to ten. Any disagreements between the Chief Procurator and the Senate were to be settled by the Tsar. Initially the Senate was headed by a supervisor post, the Inspector General of Decrees (Procurator General). In 1720, new rules of Senate procedure were issued detailing time for discussion and behaviour expected, including restricting senators from shouting. Eventually order within the senate was implemented following appointment of Prince Yakov Fyodorovich Dolgorukov as a senator in 1712.

Certain other officials and a chancellery were also attached to the Senate. While it underwent many subsequent changes, it became one of the most important institutions of imperial Russia, especially for administration and law.

The State Council, created by Alexander I, was supposed to inherit the executive power of the Senate. An envisioned parliament was to inherit legislative power, but that never happened.

In the 19th century, the Senate evolved into the highest judicial body in Russia. As such, it exercised control over all legal institutions and officials throughout the country.

The Senate was composed of several departments, two of which were Courts of Cassation (one for criminal cases, one for civil cases). It also included a Department of Heraldry, which managed matters relating to the rights of the nobles and honorary citizens.

== First nine senators ==
Count Ivan Musin-Pushkin, Boyar Tikhon Streshnev, Prince Petr Golitsyn, Prince Mikhail Dolgorukov, Grigoriy Plemiannikov, Prince Grigory Volkonsky, General Mikhail Samarin, Quartermaster general Vasiliy Apukhtin and Nazariy Melnitskiy. As an ober-secretary was appointed Anisim Schukin.

== Procurator Generals ==
- 1722 - 1735 Pavel Yaguzhinsky
- 1740 - 1760 Nikita Trubetskoy
- 1760 - 1761 Yakov Shakhovskoy
- 1761 - 1764 Aleksandr Glebov
- 1764 - 1792 Alexander Vyazemsky
- 1792 - 1796 Alexander Samoylov
- 1796 - 1798 Aleksei Kurakin
- 1798 - 1799 Pyotr Lopukhin
- 1799 - 1800 Alexander Bekleshov
- 1800 - 1801 Peter Obolyaninov

== Procurator Generals and Ministers of Justice ==
- 1802 - 1803 Gavrila Derzhavin
- 1803 - 1810 Pyotr Lopukhin
- 1810 - 1814 Ivan Dmitriev
- 1814 - 1817 Dmitriy Troshchinsky
- 1817 - 1827 Dmitry Lobanov-Rostovsky
- 1827 - 1829 Aleksei Dolgorukov
- 1829 - 1839 Dmitriy Dashkov
- 1839 Dmitry Bludov
- 1839 - 1862 Viktor Panin
- 1862 - 1867 Dmitriy Zamyatnin
- 1867 Sergei Urusov
- 1867 - 1878 Konstantin von Pahlen
- 1878 - 1885 Dmitry Nabokov
- 1885 - 1894 Nikolay Manasein
- 1894 - 1905 Nikolay Muravyov
- 1905 Sergey Manukhin
- 1905 - 1906 Mikhail Akimov
- 1906 - 1915 Ivan Shcheglovitov
- 1915 - 1916 Alexander Khvostov
- 1916 Alexander Makarov
- 1916 - 1917 Nikolay Dobrovolsky

== See also ==
- Pruth River Campaign (1710—1711)

== Bibliography ==
- Steinberg, Mark D.; Riasanovsky, Nicholas Valentine (2005). A History of Russia. Oxford [Oxfordshire]: Oxford University Press. ISBN 0-19-515394-4.
- Massie, Robert K. (2022-05-12). Peter the Great. Apollo. ISBN 978-1-80110-277-3.
