= List of chairmen of the State Council of Imperial Russia =

The following were chairmen of the State Council of Imperial Russia.

== 1810–1906 ==
Concurrently chairmen of the Committee of Ministers to 1865.

Name	Portrait	Period
Count; Nikolay Rumyantsev		1 January 1810 – March 1812
Prince; Nikolay Saltykov		29 March 1812 – 16 May 1816
Prince; Pyotr Lopukhin		25 May 1816 – 6 April 1827 †
Prince; Viktor Kochubey		29 April 1827 – 3 June 1834 †
Count; Nikolay Novosiltsev		11 July 1834 – 8 April 1838 †
Prince; Illarion Vasilchikov		9 April 1838 – 21 February 1847
Count; Vasily Levashov		31 December 1847 – 23 September 1848
Prince; Alexander Chernyshyov		1 December 1848 – 5 April 1856
Prince; Alexey Orlov		May 1857 – January 1861
Count; Dmitry Bludov		12 November 1861 – 19 February 1864 †
Prince; Pavel Gagarin		24 February 1864 – 1 January 1865
Grand Duke; Konstantin Nikolayevich		1 January 1865 – 13 July 1881
Grand Duke; Mikhail Nikolayevich		13 July 1881 – 23 August 1905
Count; Dmitri Solsky		23 August 1905 – 9 May 1906

== 1906–1917 ==
Name	Portrait	Period
Eduard Frisch		20 May 1906 – 31 March 1907 †
Mikhail Akimov		10 April 1907 – 28 June 1914
Sergey Manukhin		28 June – 11 August 1914; Acting
Ivan Golubev		11 August 1914 – 15 July 1915; Acting
Anatoly Kulomzin		15 July 1915 — 1 January 1917
Ivan Shcheglovitov		1 January – 1 March 1917
