= Alexander Samoylov =

Russian statesman and general (1744–1814)

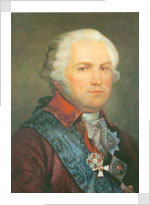
Portrait of Count Alexander Samoylov

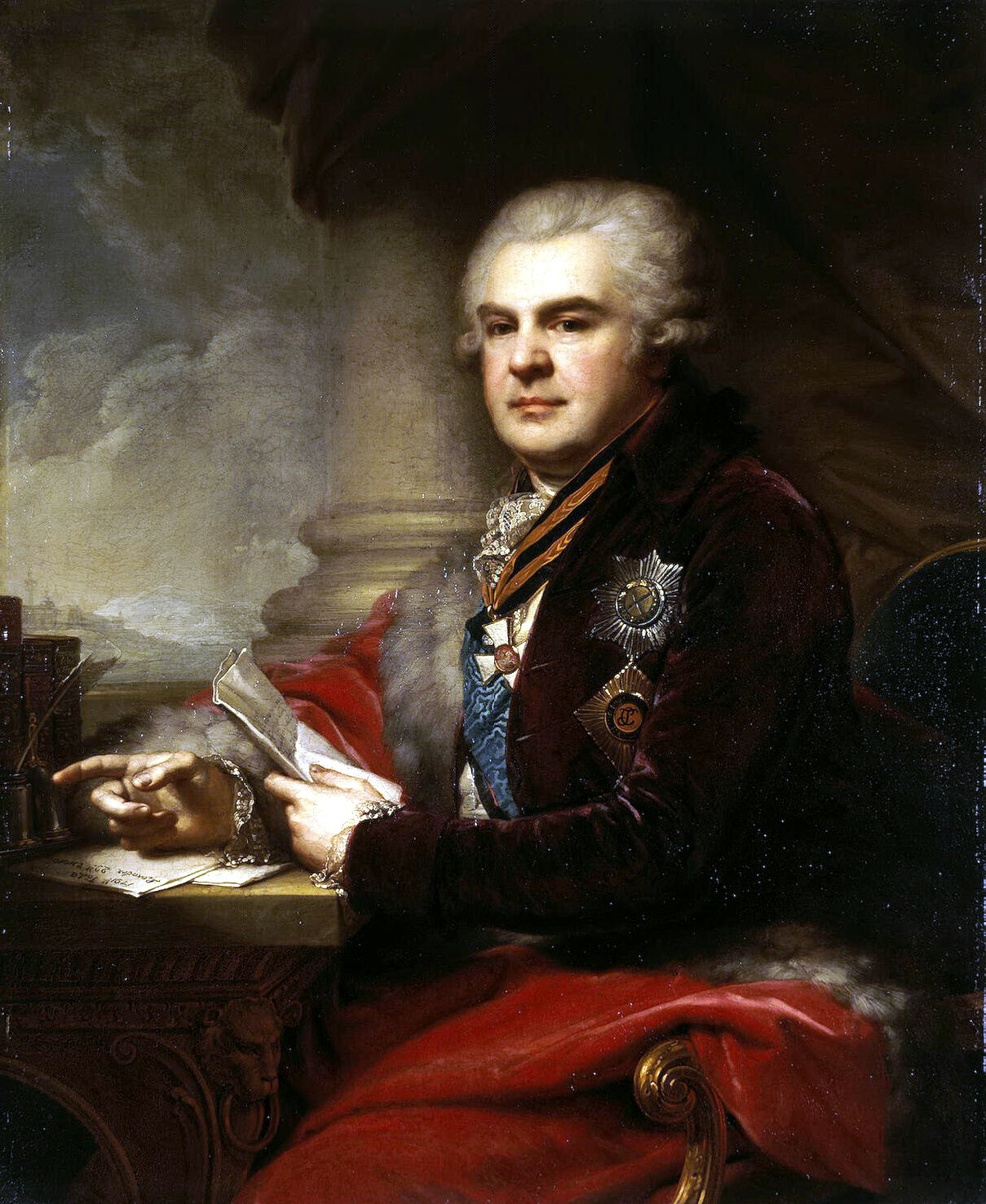
Portrait of Alexander Samoylov by Johann Baptist von Lampi the Elder (Hermitage)

Count Alexander Nikolayevich Samoylov (Note: Known as Aleksandr Nikolaevich Samoilov as well (see Romanization of Russian).) (Russian: Александр Николаевич Самойлов; 1744 – 1 November 1814) was a Russian general and statesman. He distinguished himself in the Russo-Turkish War of 1787–1792 and was the prosecutor general of the Russian Empire. He was a relative of Grigory Potemkin.

== Biography ==
Alexander Samoylov was born into the family of senator Nikolay Samoylov. He started his military service in 1760 as a soldier of Leib-Guard Semyonovsky Regiment. Later he was moved to the frontline forces and took part in the Russo-Turkish War, 1768–1774 and, for his part in the taking of Silistra, received the Order of St. George of 4th degree.

The rise to power of his relative Prince Potemkin led to a comital title being bestowed upon Samoilov in 1775. After that, he obtained quick promotion: in 1775 he was appointed a member of commission for the trial of Yemelyan Pugachev. Also he was promoted to kamer-yunker (cadet) and became the chairman of the State Council of Imperial Russia, which existed in the reign of Catherine II in 1776–1787. In 1783 he commanded the Crimean Chasseur Corps and was prominent in the campaign that led to the annexation of the Crimean Khanate by the Russian Empire.

He was Lieutenant-General during the Russo-Turkish War, 1787–1792, commanding five infantry regiments, two corps of chasseurs, seven Cossack regiments, and forty cannons. In 1788, he distinguished himself in the taking of Ochakov and was awarded the Order of St. George of 2nd degree. In 1789 he took part in the taking of Bendery and Kaushany, serving under Prince Potemkin. He received the Order of Alexander Nevsky for that campaign. On 12 December 1790, he commanded the left wing of the army of Alexander Suvorov in the storm of Izmail and was awarded the Order of St. Vladimir of 1st degree.

For his efforts in bringing about the peace treaty with the Ottoman Empire, Catherine II personally decorated him with the Order of St. Andrew. On 17 September 1792, he was appointed Prosecutor General of the Russian Empire of the Senate, replacing the seriously ill prince Alexander Vyazemsky. Upon his accession to the throne, emperor Paul I dismissed Samoylov.

Alexander Samoilov married princess Troubetzkoy and had one son, Nicholas, who did not leave issue from his marriage to Countess Yuliya Skavronsky. General Raevsky was his nephew.

== Sources ==
Preceded by Alexander Vyazemsky	Generals-Prosecutor; 1792 – 1796	Succeeded by Alexey Kurakin
