= Alexander Glebov (civil servant) =

Russian officer, civil servant and politician

Alexander Ivanovich Glebov
- Александр Иванович Глебов
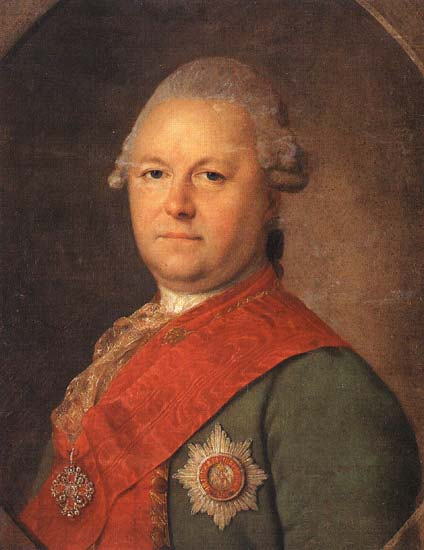

Smolensk and Belgorod Governor–General
- In office 1775–1776
- Succeeded by: Dmitry Volkov

4th Prosecutor General of the Governing Senate
- In office December 25, 1761 – February 3, 1764
- Preceded by: Yakov Shakhovskoy
- Succeeded by: Alexander Vyazemsky

General Kriegscommissar
- In office August 16, 1760 – 1775
- Preceded by: Yakov Shakhovskoy
- Succeeded by: Nikolay Durnovo

Personal details
- Born: September 6, 1722
- Died: June 14, 1790 (aged 67)
- Spouse: Maria Choglokova
- Relations: Glebovs
- Awards: Order of Saint Alexander Nevsky; Order of Saint Anna

Military service
- Rank: General–In–Chief

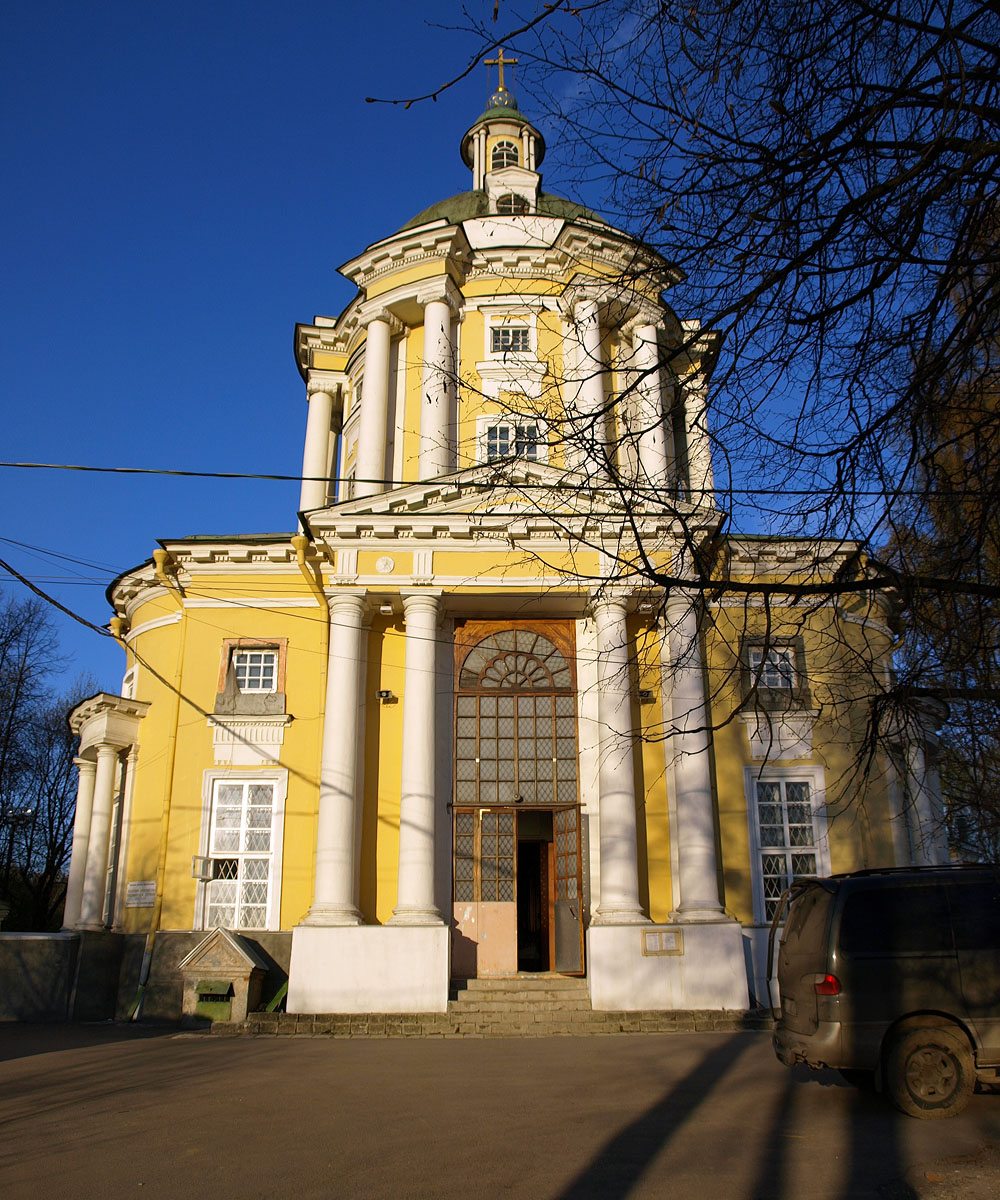
Vladimirskaya Church, built by Alexander Glebov in the Vinogradovo Estate; the place of his burial

Alexander Ivanovich Glebov (Russian: Алекса́ндр Ива́нович Гле́бов, 1722–1790) was a Russian statesman, Prosecutor General of the Governing Senate in 1761–64, owner of the Vinogradovo Estate. He lost his position due to bribery.

== Biography ==
He was born on September 6, 1722, in the noble family of the Glebovs.

At the age of fifteen, he was assigned a sergeant in the Butyrka Infantry Regiment, in which he stormed the Turkish fortress of Ochakov; on August 17, 1739, in the Battle of Stavuchany, in the rank of lieutenant, he commanded a small detachment, showing outstanding courage and ingenuity. In this battle he was seriously wounded.

He was in military service until 1749, after which he transferred to the "state" in the rank of collegiate assessor. He managed to win the trust of an important Elizabethan dignitary, Count Peter Shuvalov, who took him under his patronage. Thanks to the count, Glebov took the post of Chief Secretary of the Senate in 1754, and two years later became Chief Prosecutor.

In November 1758, he was awarded the Order of Saint Anna, and on August 16, 1760, he was appointed General Kriegskommissar. Unlike Prince Yakov Shakhovsky, Alexander Glebov performed his duties not so zealously, which especially affected the supply of the army during the war with Prussia.

On December 25, 1761, Peter III, who had just ascended the throne, appointed Alexander Glebov as Prosecutor General of the Senate. Being very friendly with the emperor, he quickly took a strong place among the nobles close to the monarch.

He was entrusted with the preparation of a number of important legalizations. In particular, Alexander Glebov is one of the authors of the famous manifestos: of February 18, 1762 "On the Granting of Liberty and Freedom to the Entire Russian Nobility" and of February 21, 1762, "On the Destruction of the Secret Chancellery".

On February 10, 1762, he was awarded the Order of Saint Alexander Nevsky, becoming the first Alexander Knight of the reign of Peter III.

Being an experienced courtier, cunning and resourceful (contemporaries called him "a man with a head"), Prosecutor General Alexander Glebov very subtly assessed the situation during the 1762 Palace Coup and, despite his attachment to Peter III, immediately supported Catherine II.

He possessed exceptional abilities and hard work, so Catherine II, although she knew about his bad inclinations and greed, continued to keep him at the highest prosecutor's post. Moreover, she entrusted him, along with Count Nikita Panin, with the leadership of the newly created Secret Expedition, which was engaged in all political affairs.

However, soon his position at court was noticeably shaken, which was largely facilitated by dubious commercial transactions, especially those related to the wine lease in Irkutsk, into which he became involved when he was the Chief Prosecutor.

After an investigation, Catherine II found that Glebov in this case turned out to be "suspicious and thereby already deprived himself of the power of attorney associated with his position". On February 3, 1764, Alexander Glebov was dismissed from the post of Prosecutor General, with the order of the Empress "henceforth not to appoint him to any positions".

Nevertheless, Catherine II herself was not inclined to abandon an intelligent, albeit selfish, employee. Therefore, Alexander Glebov retained the post of General Kriegskommissar, and in 1773, he was even granted the rank of General–In–Chief. In 1775, he received a new appointment – became the Smolensk and Belgorod Governor–General. But already the next year, the audit revealed serious abuses and embezzlements in the Main Kriegskommissariat, perpetrated during Glebov's leadership.

On the instructions of Catherine II, a special Investigative Commission was formed, and in June 1776 Glebov was summoned from the governorship to the capital, and then he was removed from all posts "even on matters concerning him, the decision will follow". Alexander Glebov was put on trial and interrogated. The final verdict in the case was approved by Catherine II only on September 19, 1784. Glebov was found guilty of "neglecting his position" and expelled from service. His estates were seized.

Removed from all affairs, Alexander Glebov lived either on his estate in Moscow, on Khodynka, or in Vinogradovo near Moscow. He died on June 14, 1790 and was buried in the Vladimir Church in Vinogradovo, the author of which is considered Matvey Kazakov, according to other sources – Vasily Bazhenov.

== Family ==
He was married three times:

1. Since 1744, on Evdokia Zybina (1709–1746);
2. Since 1756, on Marya Gendrikova (1723–19 March 1756), the widow of Nikolai Choglokov, the Chief of the Hoffmeister, favorite and cousin of Empress Elizabeth, died a month and a half after the wedding;
3. Since 1773, on Daria Franz, née von Nicolai (February 5, 1731 – May 28, 1790); because of the marriage with her, Catherine II ordered not to allow Alexander Glebov to the court.

Glebov did not have his own children, his Vinogradov Estate was inherited by the daughter of Daria Franz from her first marriage, Elizabeth, whom the Suvorov brigadier Ivan Benkendorf, uncle of the Chief of Gendarmes Alexander Benkendorf, took as his wife.

== Sources ==
- Nikolay Chulkov. Glebov, Alexander Ivanovich // Russian Biographical Dictionary: In 25 Volumes – Saint Petersburg – Moscow, 1896–1918
- Alexander Kolpakidi (2004). Encyclopedia of the Secret Services of Russia. Moscow: AST, Astrel, Transitbook. pp. 89–92. ISBN 5-17018975-3.
