= Alexander Glebov =

Alexander Glebov may refer to:

- Aleksandr Glebov (skier) (born 1983), Russian alpine skier
- Alexander Glebov (civil servant) (1722–1790), Russian officer, civil servant and politician
