= Anatoly Kulomzin =

Russian scientist and statesman (1838–1923)

Anatoly Kulozmin
- Анатолий Николаевич Куломзин
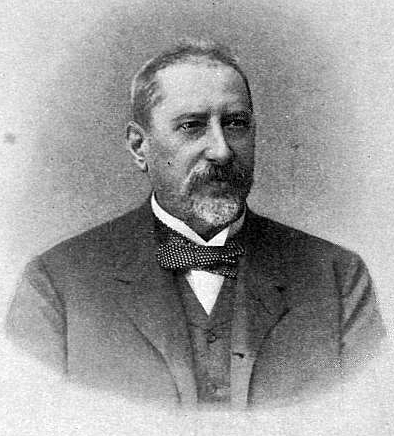

Chairman of the State Council
- In office 15 July 1915 – 1 January 1917
- Preceded by: Ivan Golubev
- Succeeded by: Ivan Shcheglovitov

Member of the State Council
- In office 23 December 1902 – 14 December 1917

Personal details
- Born: 3 January [O.S. 15 January] 1838 Kornilovo, Kineshemsky Uyezd, Russian Empire
- Died: 25 August 1923 (aged 85) Marseille, France
- Education: Imperial Moscow University

Anatoly Nikolaevich Kulomzin (Russian: Анатолий Николаевич Куломзин; 3 January 1838 – 25 August 1923) was a Russian scientist and statesman who served as chairman of the State Council of the Russian Empire from 1915 to 1917.

== Biography ==
Kulomzin was born to a family of Kostroma noble on January 3 (15), 1838, in the village of Kornilovo, Kineshemsky Uyezd, Kostroma Governorate.

In 1858, he graduated from the Law Faculty of Moscow University with a candidate of laws degree. He continued his education abroad (at Heidelberg, Berlin, Leipzig and Oxford universities). He studied the financial system and banking in France, Belgium, England, Scotland and Germany; attended lectures at the University of London.

From May 17, 1861, he began serving as a peace mediator for the Kineshemsky Uyezd of the Kostroma Governorate; he organized work in the volost governments to reduce fires in villages, to repair and strengthen roads, and created the first schools for peasant children, for whom he himself obtained books.

In 1864, he transferred to serve in the State Chancellery; was also secretary to the chairman of the Department of State Economy of the State Council. In 1868-1880 - head of the chancery department, and from 1875 assistant to the manager of affairs of the Committee of Ministers. Actual State Councilor since 1873.

In the 1880s, in his estate in the Kostroma Governorate, he organized the development of phosphorite deposits on a scientific basis.

In 1880-1883 he was an assistant to the minister of state property. Active Privy Councillor (10.01.1892), State Secretary (1883). In 1883-1902 he held the post of manager of affairs of the Committee of Ministers; simultaneously, from 1893, he was the manager of affairs of the Committee of the Siberian Railway. In fact, he led the organization of resettlement from the European part of Russia to the areas adjacent to the road; he had a significant influence on the economic and cultural development of Siberia. On Kulomzin's initiative, a fund was established under the Committee of Ministers to promote church construction in resettlement areas (1894), and later he also promoted the mass construction of Orthodox churches and schools in resettlement areas.

In 1897, he chaired a commission of representatives from various departments to study and resolve the land issue in Transbaikalia (the Kulomzin Commission). On his initiative, a hydrographic study of Lake Baikal was conducted in 1897–1902. After his trips to Siberia (1896, 1897), the taiga regions of the Tara District began to be intensively populated. In his honor, one of the railway stations near Omsk was named after Kulomzin (now Karbyshevo station). He was a supporter of the gradual Russification of the foreigners of Siberia by creating state primary schools for them with teachers from indigenous peoples and a priority study of Russian history and traditions. From December 23, 1902 - member of the State Council; from July 15, 1915, to January 1, 1917 - Chairman of the State Council; in August 1915 he was elected chairman of the Supervisory Commission of the Special Conference for the discussion and unification of measures for the defense of the state.

From 1914 he served as chairman of the Romanov Committee for the care of orphans of rural conditions.

He was engaged in scientific activities, the author of a number of scientific works, including on the history of finance in Russia. Member of the Russian Geographical Society, chairman of the first congress of representatives of provincial scientists of archival commissions, assistant to the chairman of the Imperial Russian Historical Society, author of the memoirs "Experienced", which give vivid pictures of the situation of settlers in Siberia. Kulomzin was actively involved in issues of education and enlightenment. He actively raised the issue of the need to develop education, in particular in Siberia. Having found no support either in the Ministry of Public Education or in the Synod, he organized extensive public activity on school construction in Siberia through the Committee of the Siberian Railway.

In 1919 he emigrated, from 1920 he lived in France. He died on August 25, 1923, in Marseille.
