= Maria Choglokova =

Russian lady-in-waiting and noble (1723–1756)

Countess Maria Semenovna Choglokova (Russian: Мария Симоновна Чоглокова; née Gendrikova or Hendrikova; 1723 – 19 March 1756) was a Russian lady-in-waiting and noble. She was a cousin and confidante of Empress Elizabeth of Russia, and chief lady-in-waiting to the future Catherine the Great. She played an important part in the early married life of Catherine, and is given a prominent place in Catherine's memoirs.

== Life ==
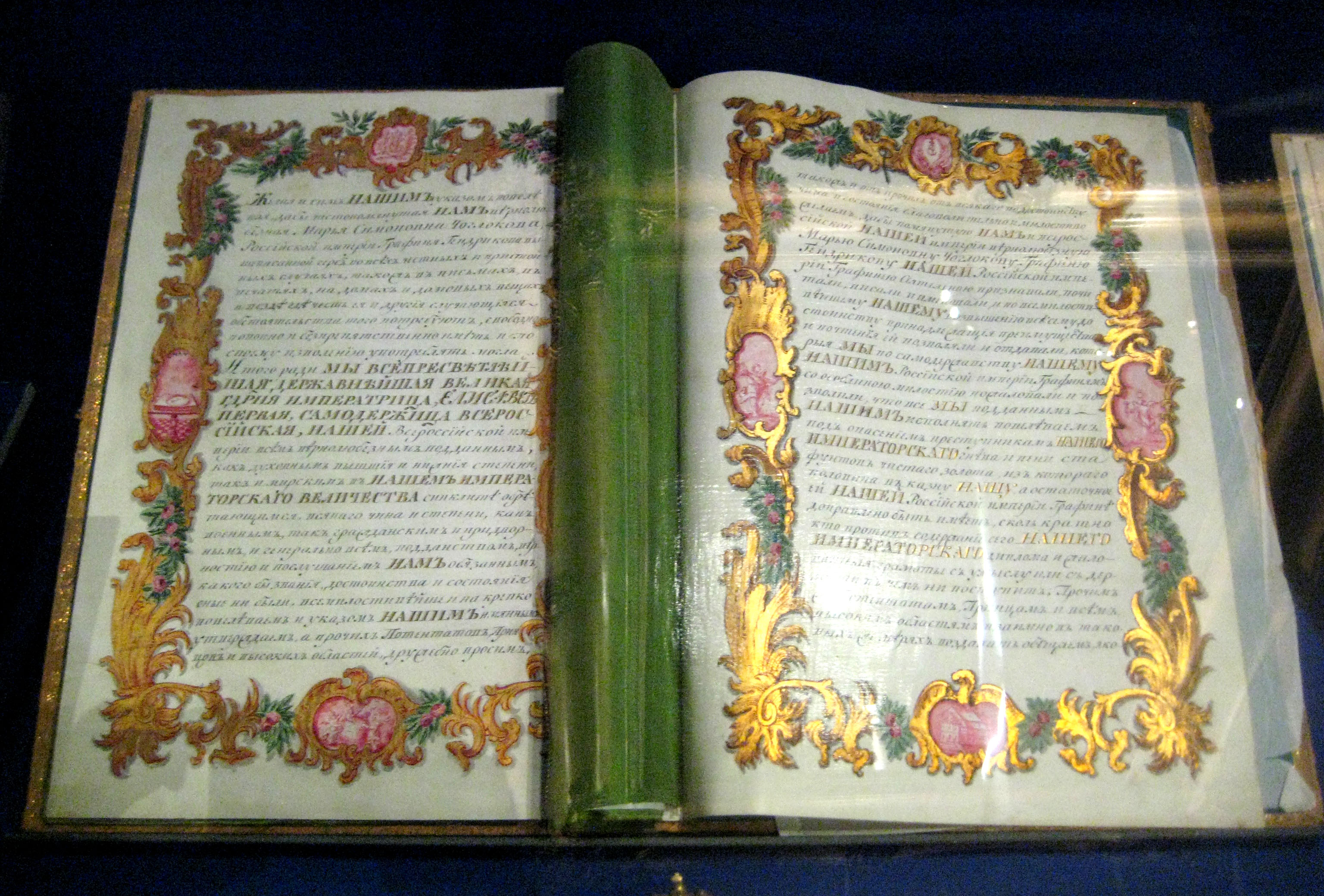
Maria Gendrikova's comital charter of 1742

Maria Semenovna Hendrikova was born in Ķegums as the 4th of five children and the second eldest of three daughters of count Simon Hendrikov (Симон Леонтьевич Гендриков) and Kristina Skavronskaya (Христина Самуиловна Скавронская) and thus the maternal first cousin of Empress Elizabeth. Upon the ascension of Empress Elizabeth, the whole Hendrikov family was granted the rank of count.

In 1742, she married Nikolai Choglokov (1718-1754) and they had four daughters and four sons.

After the marriage of Grand Duke Peter to Catherine in 1745, Choglokova was appointed chief lady-in-waiting and mistress of the household of the Grand Duchess in succession to Maria Rumyantseva, and her spouse was given the equivalent position of Chamberlain to the Grand Duke. They were appointed by recommendation of Pyotr Bestuzhev-Ryumin because of the happiness and fertility of their marriage, and was to act as an example for Peter and Catherine, whose procreation was politically important. Their task was to supervise the young couple and their behavior in all aspects and make sure that their marriage resulted in procreation of heirs to the throne and their behavior was suitable in the eyes of the public. Choglokova, for example, was always to make sure that Catherine never neglected her religious duties, and or placed herself in any situation with men that could damage her reputation.

In 1752, a change occurred in the behavior of Choglokova. Until then concerned with the marital virtue of Catherine, according to the first version of Catherine's memoirs, edited by Alexander Hertzen, Choglokova had a conversation with Catherine in which she assured Catherine that adultery could be acceptable if circumstances made them necessary. She asked Catherine if she would prefer Sergei Saltykov or Lev Naryshkin, and when Catherine answered that she preferred the former, Choglokova stated that Catherine could trust her and her love for her country, and that she could be assured that she would be of no trouble to her. There is a version of Catherine memoirs that Choglokova only advised her to obtain a platonic lover to make Peter jealous, to consummate their marriage with Peter and to obtain a legal heir to the throne. This conversation is famous and has been interpreted as an indication that Choglokova acted on the orders of Empress Elizabeth, who was tired of the slow procreation of Peter and Catherine and would allow for Catherine to become pregnant from Peter by any means to get rid of both Catherine and Peter ASAP as heirs involved in military plots against Elizabeth.

During the last years of their service at court, the Choglokov marriage itself fell apart, and after her husband had committed adultery, Choglokova did the same. She was widowed in 1754 and was relieved of her court office, and her and husband was replaced in their respective offices at court by another couple: Catherine Ivanovna Kasturina (1718-1790) and Alexander Shuvalov.

She remarried Alexander Glebov.
