= Alexander Bekleshov =

Russian statesman and soldier

Alexander Andreevich Bekleshov
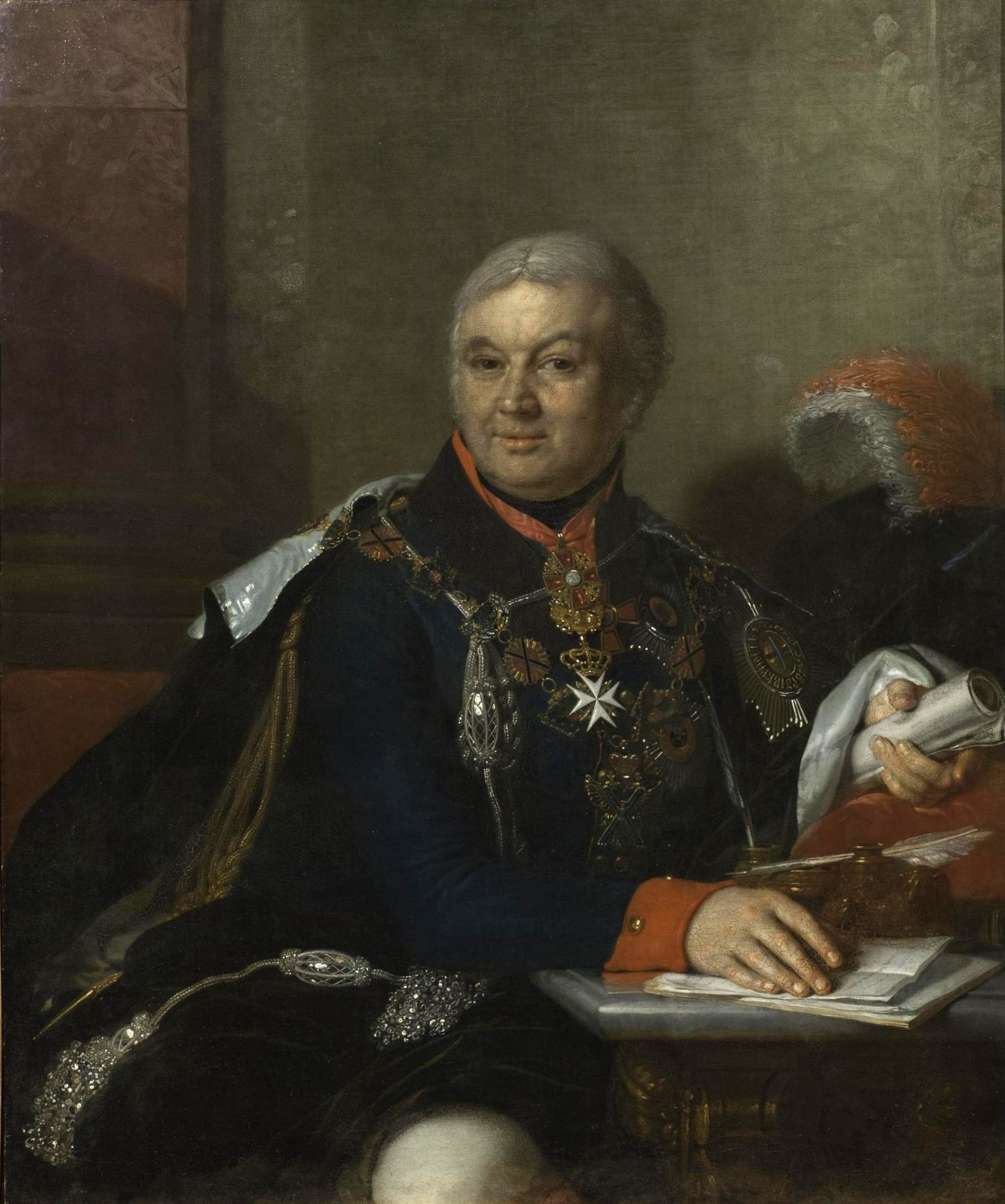
- Born: March 12, 1743
- Died: August 5, 1808 (aged 65); Riga, Russian Empire
- Occupation: State employee
- Awards: Order of the Holy Apostle Andrew the First–Called; Order of Saint Alexander Nevsky; Order of Saint Vladimir; Order of Saint Anna; Order of Saint John of Jerusalem

Alexander Andreevich Bekleshov (Bekleshev) (Russian: Алекса́ндр Андре́евич Беклешов (Беклешев); 1743–1808, Riga) was a Russian statesman and military figure, an infantry general (1797). Under Paul I twice (in 1799 and 1801) he served as Prosecutor General.

At various times he headed the following provinces and governorships: Riga, Oryol and Kursk, Kiev, Podolsk and Little Russian. In 1804–1806, he actually held the post of Moscow Governor–General (official name: "Moscow Military Governor and Commander–in–Chief in Moscow and the Moscow Province for the Civilian Part").

Brother of the Bekleshovs: Arseny, Nikolai, Sergei and Alexei.

== Biography ==
Born March 12, 1743; son of the Captain lieutenant of the Fleet Andrei Bogdanovich Bekleshev and his wife Anna Yuryevna, née Golenishcheva–Kutuzova.

In 1756, he was admitted to the Land Cadet Corps. He knew several foreign languages. In 1769, he was accepted into the service of the Life Guards Preobrazhensky Regiment. Member of the Russian–Turkish War of 1768–1774: he was in the archipelago campaign under the command of Count Alexei Orlov and on July 26, 1770, fought in the Battle of Chesme.

In 1773, he was transferred to the army as a colonel; on May 5, 1779, he was appointed Major general as commander of the Shlisselburg Infantry Regiment.

In 1783, with the rank of major general, he retired from military service; appointed by Catherine II as governor of Riga. Was in this post for about six years; proved to be the best. As a reward for his work in organizing the Riga Governorship, in 1784, Bekleshov was awarded the Order of Saint Vladimir, 2nd Class, and on April 14, 1789, he was promoted to lieutenant general.

In 1789, Alexander Bekleshev became the Governor–General of the Oryol and Kursk Governorships. For his General–Governor's service, which lasted until the end of the reign of Catherine II, he was awarded the Order of Saint Alexander Nevsky.

The reign of Paul I, which began in 1796, was marked by frequent and sudden personnel changes. Opals and awards, appointments and dismissals alternated each other. Alexander Andreevich managed to be the Military Governor of Kamenets–Podolsky and the Governor–General of Little Russia for three years, the Military Governor of Kiev and simultaneously the Chief of the Kiev Grenadier Regiment and Inspector of the Ukrainian Division. During this service he was promoted to the rank of General of Infantry; at the same time he was granted the civil rank of real privy councillor.

Since June 7, 1799 – in the retinue of the emperor and a member of the Imperial Council. A month later, a new appointment followed – the Prosecutor General, with the award of the Order of Saint John of Jerusalem. When Alexander Bekleshev was appointed to this position, the emperor said: "You and I, I and you – forward we will do things alone".

But Bekleshev stayed in this position for a little more than six months: on February 2, 1800, an unexpected disgrace followed with removal from public service altogether. Mikhail Speransky subsequently noted that Bekleshev "had little respect for the demands of random people at court and therefore often fell out with them".

In the very first days after the accession to the throne of Alexander I, on March 16, 1801, Alexander Andreevich was returned to the service and reinstated in the position of Prosecutor General, which he held until the reform of public administration. During the coronation of the new monarch, he was awarded the Order of Saint Andrew the First–Called. Alexander Bekleshev, due to conservative convictions, did not share the reformist ardor of the emperor; with the establishment of ministries (September 8, 1802) and the combination of the posts of the Prosecutor General and the Minister of Justice, he was resigned.

In April 1804, he received a new appointment – the Governor–General of Moscow, but did not stay in his new position for long: two years later, for health reasons, Alexander Bekleshev left the service in senior positions. The recognition of state merits was the award of diamond badges of the Order of Saint Andrew the First–Called.

He died suddenly in Riga on August 5, 1808; buried at the city Pokrovsky Cemetery. He was not married, but raised his adopted (illegitimate) son Alexei, who died during the Patriotic War of 1812 at the age of 22.

== Personal life and qualities ==
Mikhail Speransky, evaluating the prosecutor generals of the Pavlovian time, wrote: "Bekleshev was smarter than all of them, but also more unhappy than all of them – he did not succeed; Obolyaninov had the least ability of all of them, and he got away with everything". A favorable opinion was about Bekleshov and Prince Adam Chartoryisky:

He was a man of the old Russian party, rude in appearance, but who, under a very rude appearance, kept a truthful heart, firm and compassionate to the misfortunes of others. His reputation as a noble man was well established... He resisted, as far as he could, theft, abuse, deceit. He could not stand his attorneys abusing justice for their own gain. He emerged clean and unblemished from this ordeal, surrounded by the gratitude of the locals. There are very few such examples among the highest dignitaries.

Alexander Bekleshev always showed a favorable attitude towards the Jews. In 1797, he appealed to the Senate with a request that in the Volyn and Podolsk Regions, Jews not be subordinate to landowners, but to magistrates, in which they would sit on equal terms with Christians. In 1802, as a member of the State Council, he spoke out against the prohibition of Jews to trade in the capitals and inland provinces.

Complete track record

=== Military service ===
- August 21, 1757 – admitted to the Land Gentry Cadet Corps;
- March 19, 1762 – sergeant;
- April 20, 1764 – he graduated from the Cadet Corps with the rank of second lieutenant and, as the best graduate of his course, was left in the corps as a corps adjutant;
- February 1, 1767 – promoted to corps lieutenants and army captain;
- 1766 – member of the Board of the Corps;
- September 14, 1769 – at the request of Count Alexei Orlov, he was transferred to the Life Guards Preobrazhensky Regiment as a lieutenant and sent to the Mediterranean Squadron with landing troops;
- 1770 – participated in the siege of the Modon Fortress, the Chesme Battle, the blockade of the Island of Lemnos and the battle of the Pelari Fortress;
- 1771 – for participation in the Battle of Chesme, he was promoted to lieutenant commander of the Life Guards Preobrazhensky Regiment;
- 1771 – participated in the landing of troops on Negropont and in the assault on Mytilene;
- November 24, 1773 – promoted to colonel of the army, appointed commander of the Shlisselburg Infantry Regiment, with whom he returned to Russia after making peace with the Turks;
- January 1, 1774 – brigadier;
- May 5, 1779 – major general with the appointment of commander of the Shlisselburg Infantry Regiment.

=== Public service ===
- May 13, 1783 – member of the Military College;
- December 8, 1783 – at the personal choice of the Empress, he was appointed governor of Riga. He helped the Governor of the Baltic Region, Count Yuri Brown, to put into practice the new regulation on the provinces (1775), the city status and the charter to the nobility (1785). He was engaged in the development of schools and the teaching of the Russian language;
- 1784 – granted the Order of Saint Vladimir, 2nd Class, Grand Cross;
- April 14, 1789 – lieutenant general;
- November 24, 1790 – Governor–General of Oryol and Kursk;
- June 28, 1796 – awarded the Order of Saint Alexander Nevsky;
- December 2, 1796 – Governor of Little Russia;
- December 3, 1796 – lieutenant general, Chief of the Vladimir Musketeer Regiment;
- December 4, 1796 – the Military Governor of Kamenets–Podolsk, with instructions to manage the Volyn, Minsk and Podolsk Provinces (the Bratslav Province, which was also subordinate to him, was disbanded at the beginning of 1797);
- January 27, 1797 – head of the Yekaterinoslav Division and the Kamenets Garrison;
- April 5, 1797 – on the occasion of the coronation of Paul I, 1000 souls of peasants were granted to Bekleshov;
- April 10, 1797 – General of the Infantry;
- February 1798 – incurred royal dissatisfaction with the unrest in the Corps of Prince Condé entrusted to him;
- March 14, 1798 – demoted to Active Privy Councilor with an appointment to be present in the IV Department of the Senate;
- June 13, 1798 – Governor–General of Kiev and Little Russia with the head of the civil part in these provinces;
- June 14, 1798 – again granted the rank of general of infantry;
- October 24, 1798 – Chief of the Kiev Grenadier Regiment and Inspector of the Ukrainian Infantry Division;
- June 6, 1799 – received the Highest Order for the immediate arrival in Saint Petersburg;
- June 7, 1799 – enlisted in the retinue of His Majesty;
- June 25, 1799 – appointed to be present in the Imperial Council;
- June 27, 1799 – appointed to sit in the Senate;
- July 7, 1799 – Prosecutor General;
- July 8, 1799 – Commander of the Order of Saint John of Jerusalem;
- August 1, 1799 – member of the Commission of Supplies of the Imperial Residence;
- February 8, 1800 – petitioned for complete dismissal from service;
- March 16, 1801 – re–appointed Prosecutor General;
- March 30, 1801 – member of the Indispensable Council under the Emperor;
- September 15, 1801 – granted the Order of Saint Andrew the First–Called on the occasion of the coronation of Alexander I;
- September 8, 1802 – at his own request (due to disagreement with the Westernizing views of the emperor and his entourage), he was dismissed from all posts with the leaving of a full salary;
- April 30, 1804 – Moscow Military Governor and Manager of the Civil Part in the Province;
- May 1, 1804 – appointed to the presence in the Moscow V Department of the Senate;
- May 3, 1804 – confirmed his retention of the title of member of the State Council;
- January 29, 1805 – transferred to the VI Criminal Department of the Senate;
- August 3, 1806 – for health reasons and his own request, he was dismissed from the post of Moscow Military Governor, leaving his presence in the Senate. Awarded with diamond badges of the Order of Saint Andrew the First–Called;
- 1806 – Commander–in–Chief of the Second Region of the State Militia (Estland, Livonia, Courland and Pskov Provinces). He was awarded the Order of Saint Vladimir, 1st Class;
- March 23, 1808 – received an order to be present in the II Branch of the VI Department of the Senate.

== Sources ==
- Bekleshov, Alexander Andreevich // Russian Biographical Dictionary: in 25 Volumes – Saint Petersburg, 1900 – Volume 2: Alexinsky – Bestuzhev–Ryumin – Pages 671–673
- Bekleshov, Alexander Andreevich // Jewish Encyclopedia of Brockhaus and Efron – Saint Petersburg, 1909 – Volume 4 – Column 49
- Bekleshovs // Encyclopedic Dictionary of Brockhaus and Efron: in 86 Volumes (82 Volumes and 4 Additional Ones) – Saint Petersburg, 1891 – Volume III – Pages 354–355
- Moscow: Encyclopedia / Editor–in–Chief Sigurd Schmidt; Compilers: M. I. Andreev, V. M. Karev – Moscow: Great Russian Encyclopedia, 1997 – 976 Pages – 100,000 Copies – ISBN 5-85270-277-3
- Alexander Andreevich Bekleshov // Kievan Antiquity – Volume XXVIII – January–March 1890 – Pages 255–304
- Vladimir Ikonnikov. Alexander Andreevich Bekleshev – Kiev, 1890
- Vladimir Ikonnikov. Alexander Bekleshev, Little Russian Military Governor–General – Kiev, 1890
