= Dmitri Solsky =

Russian politician (1833–1910)

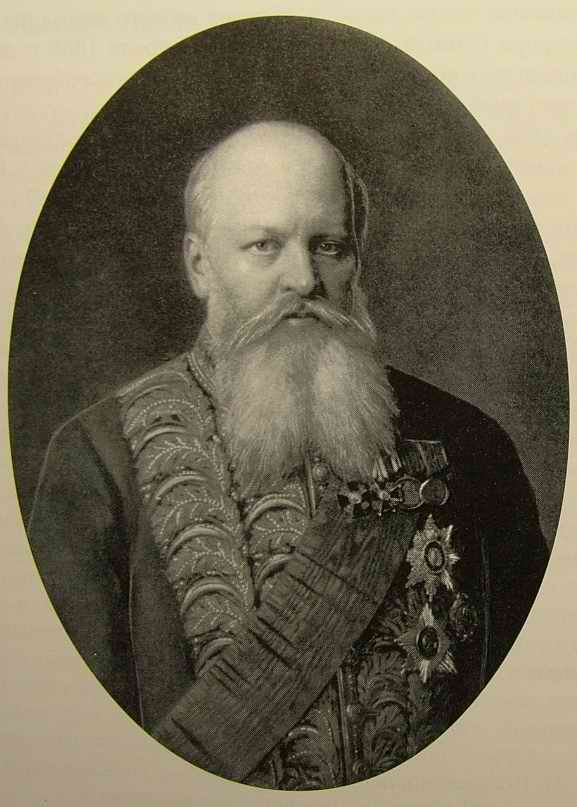
Dmitri Solsky.

Count Dmitri Martynovich Solsky (Russian: Дмитрий Мартынович Сольский; 15 September [O.S. 3 September] 1833–12 November [O.S. 29 October] 1910) was an Imperial Russian politician. He served in the position of Imperial State Controller (an Imperial Minister equivalent) in 1878–1889. After leaving that post he was appointed to the Imperial State Council. He served as Chairman of the Imperial State Council in 1905–1906. He was created a Count in 1902.

Preceded by Samuil Greig	Imperial State Controller; 7 July 1878 – 11 July 1889	Succeeded by Terty Filippov

Preceded by Grand Duke Michael Nikolaevich of Russia	State Council Chairman; 23 August 1905 – 9 May 1906	Succeeded by Eduard Frisch
