= Kineshemsky Uyezd =

Subdivision of the Russian Empire

Kineshemsky Uyezd (Кинешемский уезд) was one of the subdivisions of the Kostroma Governorate of the Russian Empire. It was situated in the southwestern part of the governorate. Its administrative centre was Kineshma.

== Demographics ==
At the time of the Russian Empire Census of 1897, Kineshemsky Uyezd had a population of 143,810. Of these, 99.9% spoke Russian and 0.1% Yiddish as their native language.
