= Nikita Trubetskoy =

Russian statesman and field marshal

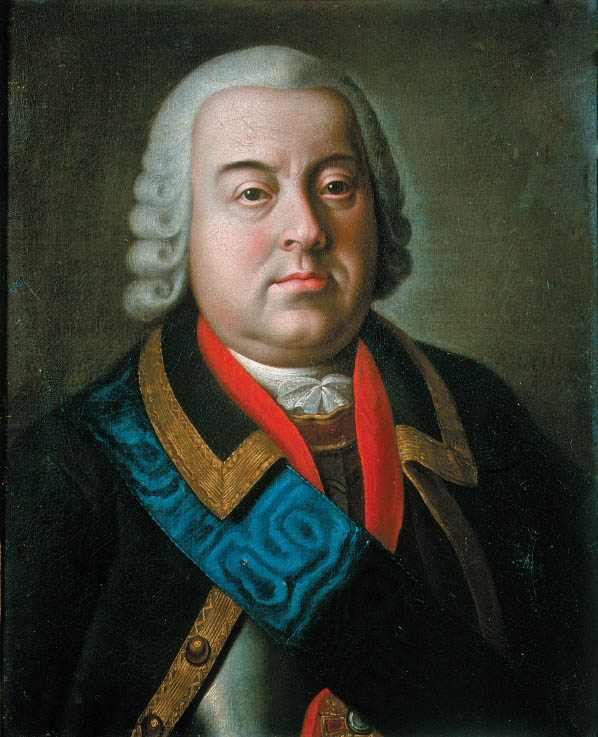
Trubetskoy before 1760

Prince Nikita Yurievich Trubetskoy (Russian: Никита Юрьевич Трубецкой; 26 May 1699 – 16 October 1767) was a Russian statesman and Field Marshal (1756), minister of defense of Russia 1760.

His parents were general-poruchik and senator Prince Yuri Yurievich Troubetzkoy (20 April 1668 – 8 September 1739), who was governor of Belgorod, and Princess Elena Grigorievna Tcherkassky (b. before 1696).

In 1715-1717, Nikita Trubetskoy was educated abroad. He started his military career as the batman of Peter I. In 1722 he joined the Preobrazhensky Regiment in the rank of sergeant and promoted to ensign in 1722. In 1730, Trubetskoy was one of staunch opponents of the Supreme Privy Council and supported the empress Anna Ivanovna. He had taken part in all of the Russian wars until 1740, then he presided the Voiennaia Kolleguia (ministere of army). He was appointed General-Prosecutor of the Governing Senate. Trubetskoy remained on this post until 1760. He headed the investigation and trial of Andrei Osterman (1741), Aleksei Bestuzhev-Ryumin (1758) and others. In 1760, Trubetskoy became a senator and president of the Military Board. He retired in 1763. He died Marechal of Russia, senator and actual private counsellor. His memories are published in Russkaya Starina in 1870.

Nikita Trubetskoy is known to have been a very enlightened man and connoisseur of art. He was a friend of prince Antioch Kantemir and writer Mikhail Kheraskov, and a patron of Yakov Shakhovsky.

Preceded by Pavel Yaguzhinsky	General-Prosecutor of Russia; 1740 – 1760	Succeeded by Yakov Shakhovsky
