= Alexander Vyazemsky =

Russian politician

- Александр Вяземский
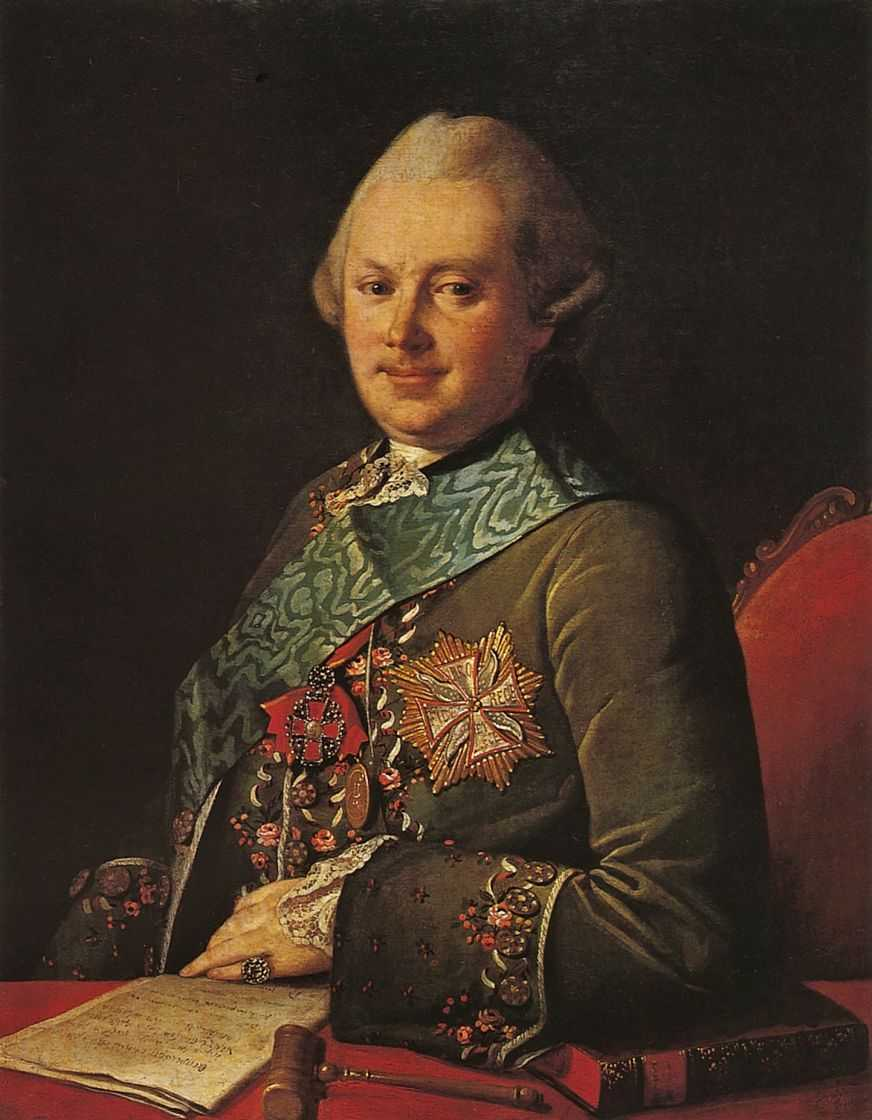
- Portrait by Carl-Ludwig Christinek, 1768
- Born: Alexander Alekseevich Vyazemsky; 14 August 1727
- Died: 20 January 1793 (aged 65)
- Occupation: Politician
- Spouse: Elena Trubetskaya (1743–1832)
- Children: Praskovya Vyazemskaya, Ekaterina Vyazemskaya and Anna Vyazemskaya
- Parents: Alexey Vyazemsky (d. 1737) (father); Pelageya Poznyakova (mother)
- Awards: Orders: Order of the Holy Apostle Andrew the First–Called; Order of Saint Vladimir; Order of Saint Alexander Nevsky; Order of Saint Anna; Order of the White Eagle

Prince Alexander Alekseevich Vyazemsky (Russian: Александр Алексеевич Вяземский; 14 August 1727 – 20 January 1793) was one of the trusted dignitaries of Catherine II, who, as the prosecutor general of the Senate, monitored the spending of state funds and had a reputation as incorruptible.

== Early life ==
Vyazemsky was born on 14 August 1727. He belonged to a princely family, originating from the grandson of Vladimir Monomakh – Prince Rostislav Mstislavich. At the age of twenty, Alexander Alekseevich graduated from the Land Gentry Corps. During the Seven Years' War with Prussia, he participated not only in the battles of the Russian Army, but also in the implementation of some secret (presumably, intelligence) orders of the command, which almost cost him his life. By the end of the war, Alexander Vyazemsky already held the post of Quartermaster General and was well known to the young Empress Catherine II. In December 1762, she instructed him to "settle relations" between the rebellious peasants and their owners in the Ural factories. He has been in this business for almost a year. In December 1763, he was recalled from the Urals, and Major General Alexander Bibikov was sent in his place, completing the mission begun by Vyazemsky.

== General Prosecutor ==
On 14 February 1764, Catherine II, convinced of the exceptional honesty of Prince Vyazemsky, appointed him Prosecutor General of the Senate. She personally wrote his "secret instruction", in which she clearly defined his responsibilities. The Empress reminded Alexander Vyazemsky that the Prosecutor General should be completely frank with the sovereign, since "in his position he is obliged to resist the strongest people", and this is only the imperial power "one of his support". She emphasized that she did not require "caress" from him, but "the only sincere treatment and firmness in business". Catherine II warned the Prosecutor General against getting involved in intrigues at court and suggested to have only "the only benefit of the fatherland and justice in mind, and take firm steps to take the shortest path to the truth".

Alexander Vyazemsky, presumably, strictly adhered to the instructions given to him and enjoyed the full confidence of the empress, which allowed him not only to hold the highest prosecutor's post for almost 29 years, but also to significantly expand his powers. If at the beginning of his career he headed the Senate, and also oversaw the sale of salt and wine in the empire, then from the 1780s he already firmly held in his hands not only justice, but also finance and internal affairs. It was he who for the first time in Russia introduced strict reporting in financial affairs, and also began to clearly take into account income and expenses for the year.

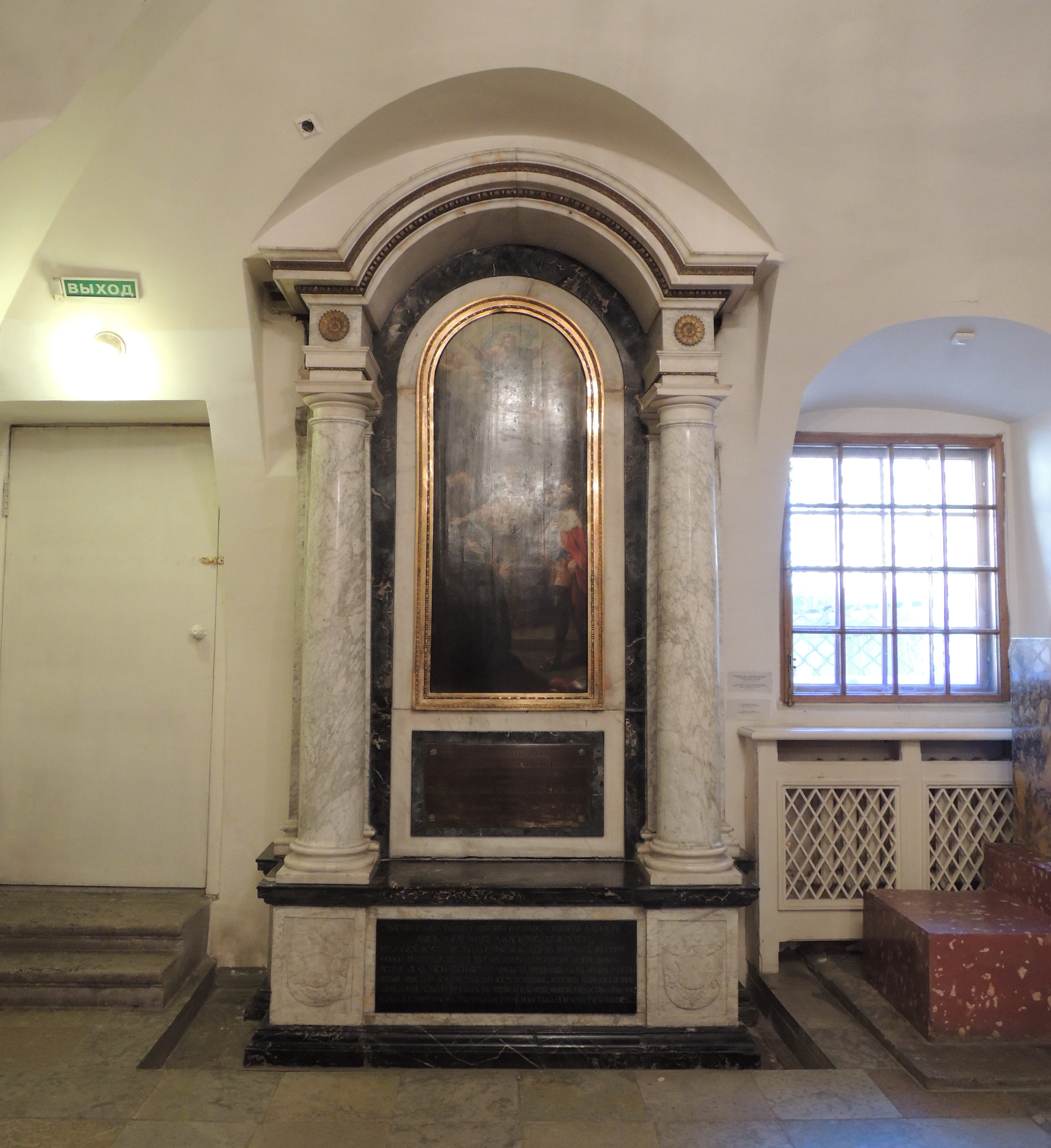
Tombstone of the Vyazemsky couple

The Prosecutor General now almost single–handedly led the Secret Expedition, and almost all the known political affairs of the reign of Catherine II passed through his hands: Emelyan Pugachev, Alexander Radishchev, Nikolay Novikov and others. Under him, the main "whip–fighter" or, as Alexander Pushkin called him, "the domestic executioner of the meek Catherine" Stepan Sheshkovsky, who had, in the words of the empress, "a special gift to carry out investigative affairs", developed his active detective activity.

Alexander Vyazemsky, unlike his predecessor, actively led the prosecutors subordinate to him. Under him, "Institutions for the Administration of Governorates" (1775) were put into effect, which regulated in detail the rights and obligations of the local prosecutor's office.

For "diligence, zeal and jealousy for the benefits of the service" he was awarded many awards, receiving, in particular, the Orders of Saint Andrew the First–Called (1773), Saint Alexander Nevsky, Saint Anna, Saint Vladimir, 1st Degree (1782), White Eagle. Alexander Vyazemsky had the military rank of lieutenant general and the civilian rank of a Real Privy Councillor.

In September 1792, Alexander Vyazemsky retired due to illness, and Catherine II assigned the numerous duties he performed to several people. Dmitry Bantysh–Kamensky wrote about him as follows: "Prince Vyazemsky was distinguished by his loyalty to his throne, unselfishness, was extremely hardworking, knew how to choose worthy assistants; an enemy of luxury, but stingy and envious, as his contemporaries spoke of him".

Prince Vyazemsky died of paralysis on 20 January 1793; a modest tombstone can be seen in the Annunciation Church of the Alexander Nevsky Lavra. The Murzinka Estate built by him near Saint Petersburg was inherited by his daughter Anna, and then by her grandson Anton Apraksin.

== Family ==
Since July 1768, Prince Vyazemsky was married to a much younger princess Elena Trubetskoy (1745–1832), daughter of the Elizabethan Prosecutor General Nikita Trubetskoy. On the occasion of the wedding, he received a dowry in the village of Aleksandrovskoye on the banks of the Neva, where he erected the famous Kulich and Easter Church. Vyazemsky's wife was a lady of state, but Catherine II did not love her. Having outlived her husband for almost forty years, Princess Elena Nikitichna occupied an honorable place among the Saint Petersburg aristocracy. Four daughters have grown up in the family of the Prosecutor General:

- Ekaterina Alexandrovna (1769–1824), since 1789, married to Count Dmitry Tolstoy (1754–1832);
- Anna Alexandrovna (1770–1840), heiress of Murzinka–Alexandrovsky, since 1788, the wife of the Neapolitan envoy in Saint Petersburg, Antonino Maresca, Duke of Serracapriola (1750–1822);
- Praskovya Alexandrovna (1772–1835), since 1790, the wife of Count Dmitry Zubov (1766–1849);
- Varvara Alexandrovna (20 May 1773 – 27 September 1849), was born in Saint Petersburg, baptized in Saint Isaac's Cathedral; goddaughter of Prince Grigory Orlov and grandmother Tatyana Vyazemskaya. In 1791, she was married to the Danish envoy Baron Niels Rosenkrantz (1757–1824), who later became Prime Minister of Denmark. She died in Copenhagen.
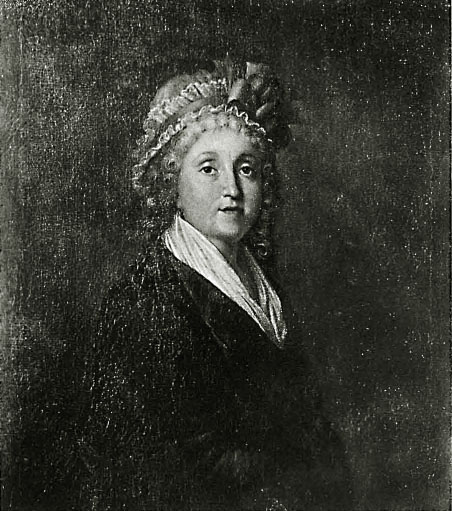
Elena Nikitichna

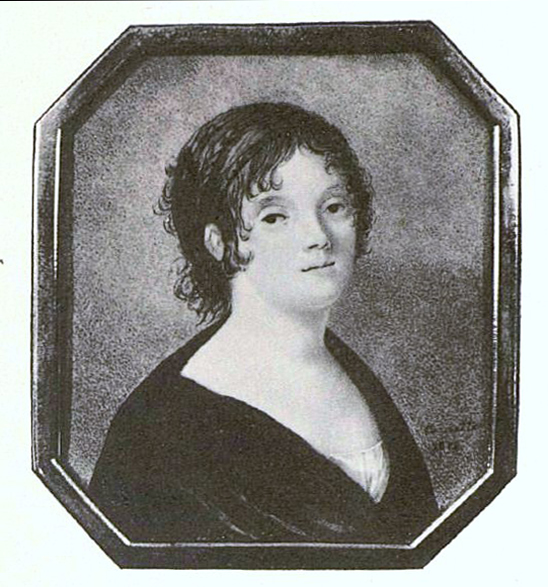
Catherine

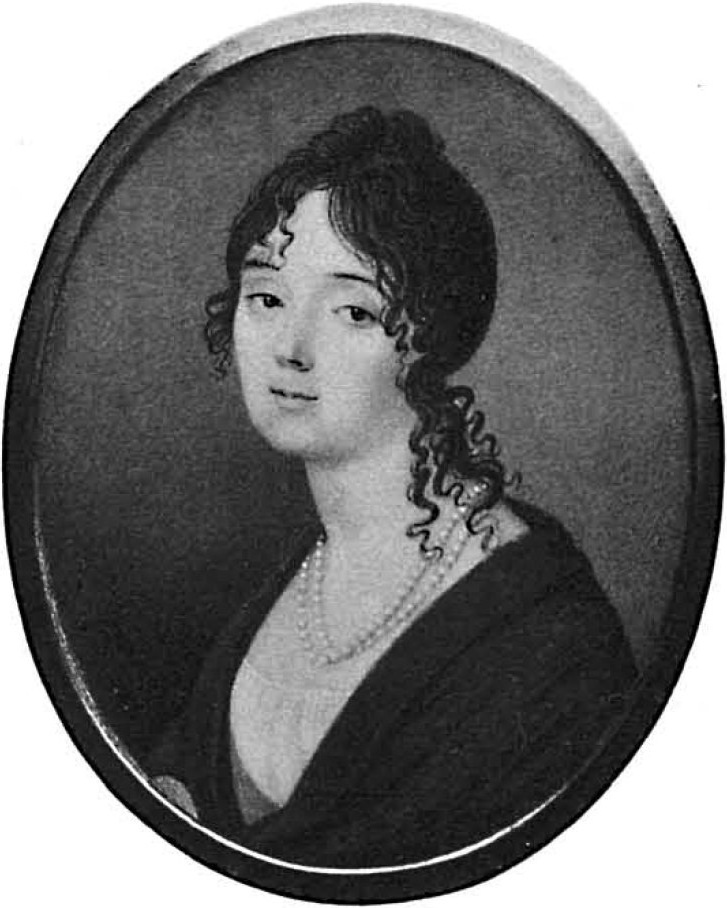
Anna

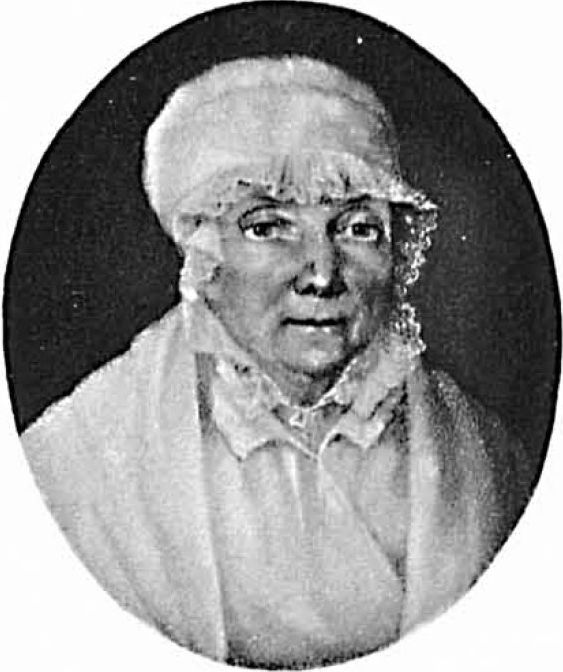
Praskovya

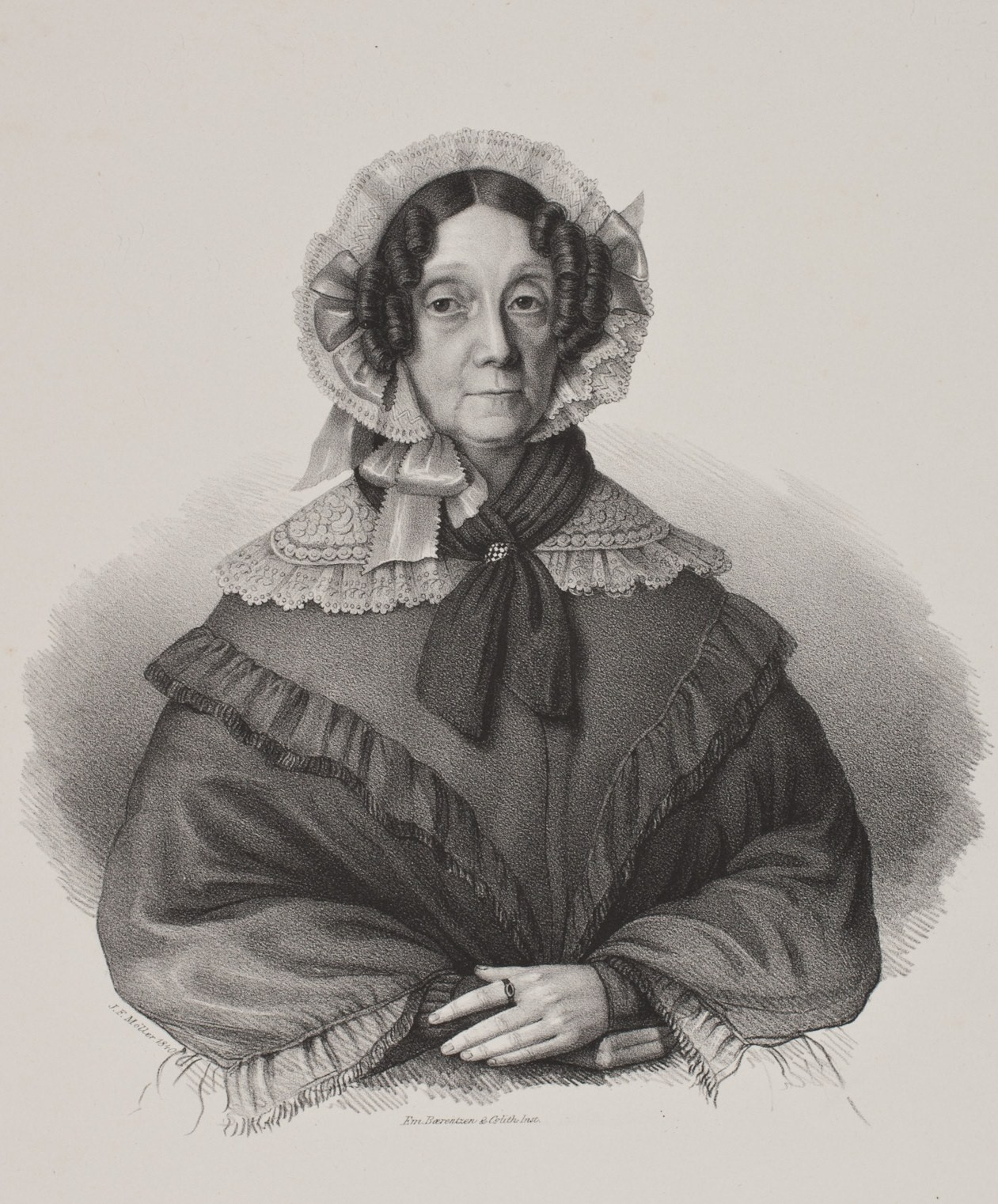
Barbara

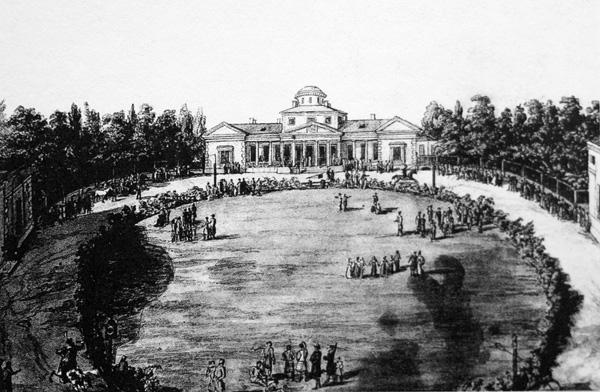
Manor Murzinka (Alexandrovskoe)

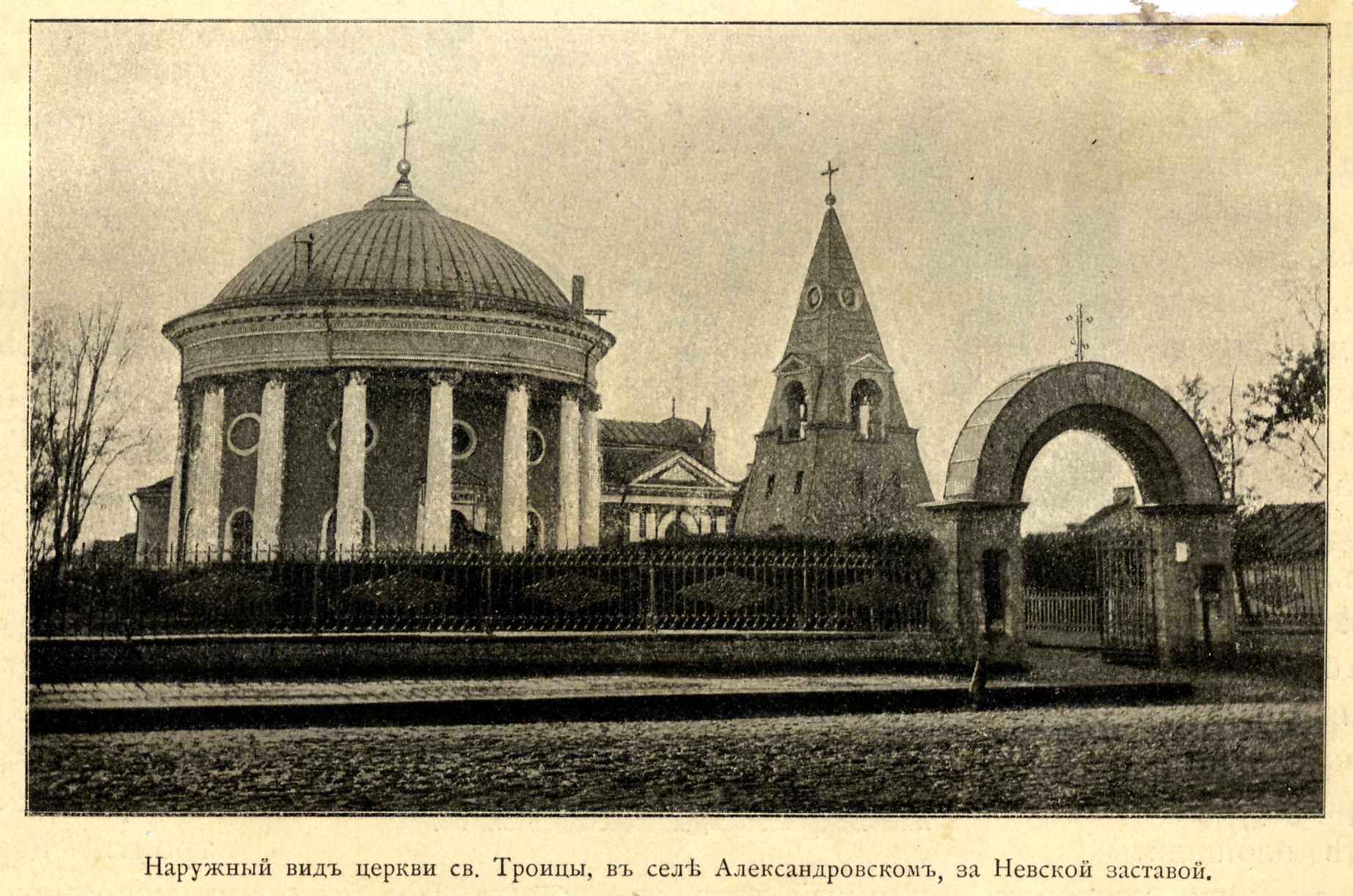
Manor Church, built by order of Alexander Vyazemsky

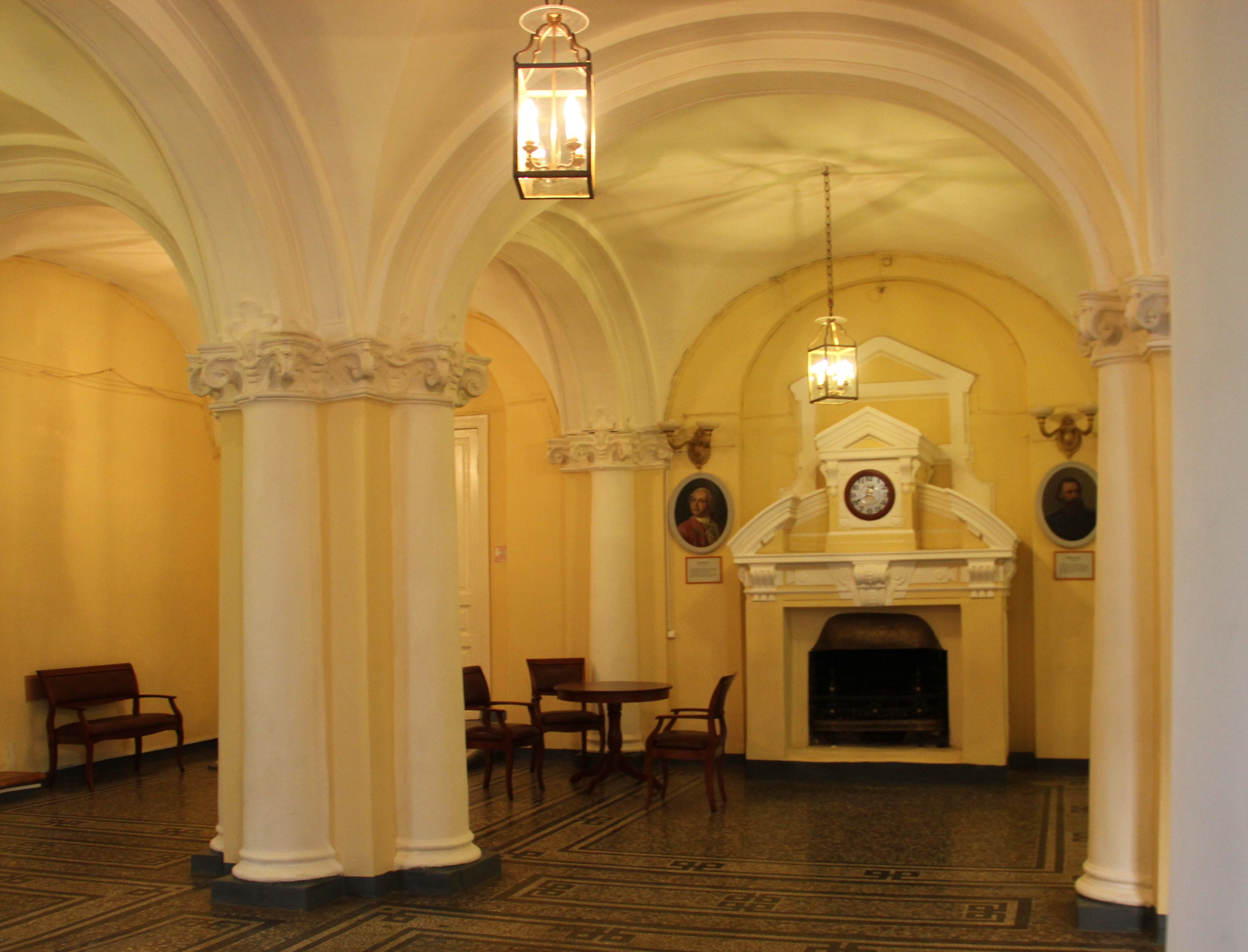
The interior of Vyazemsky's house on Italian Street

== Sources ==
- Mikhail Alekseev, Alexander Pachkalov. Finance Ministers: From the Russian Empire to the Present Day – Moscow: Albina Publisher, 2019 – 554 Pages
- Alexander Kolpakidi, Alexander Sever (2010). Special Services of the Russian Empire. Encyclopedia of Special Services. Moscow: Yauza Eksmo. pp. 66–72. ISBN 978-5-699-43615-6.
