= Yakov Shakhovskoy =

Russian statesman

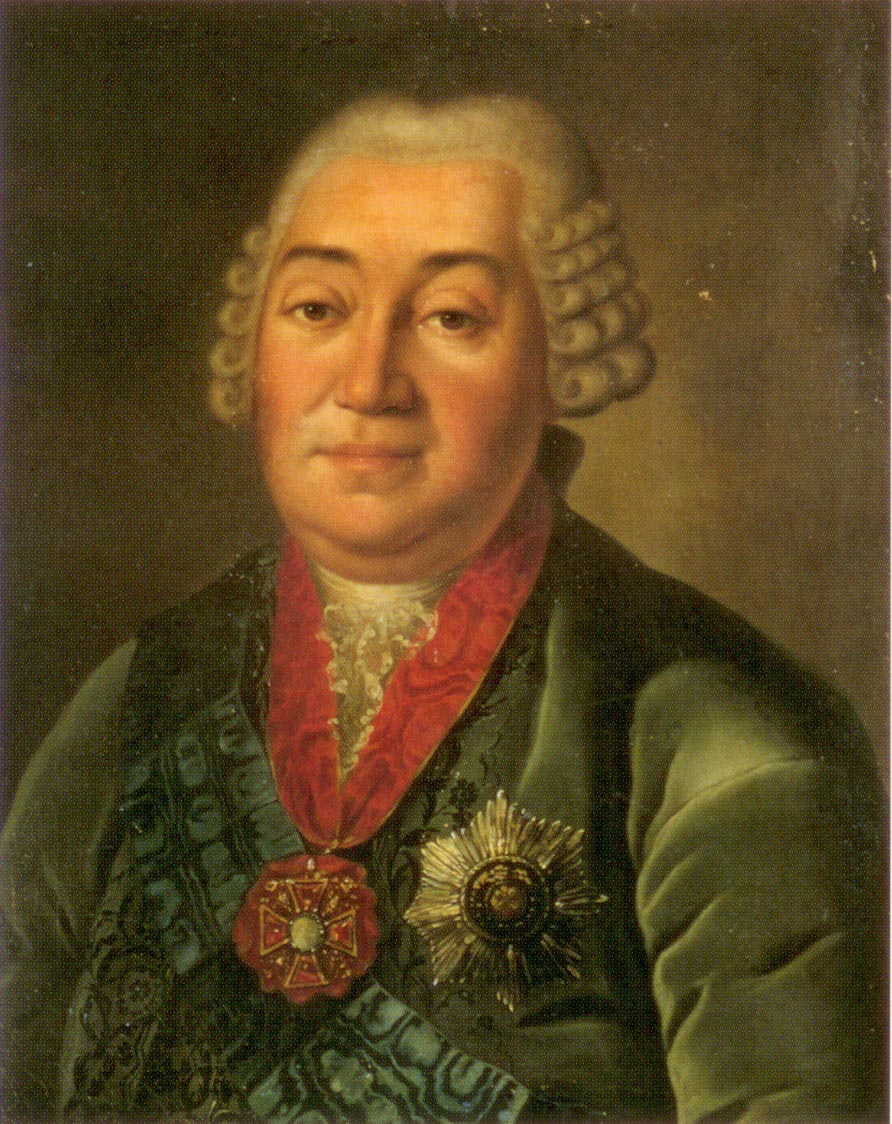
Yakov Petrovich Shakhovskoy

Prince Yakov Petrovich Shakhovskoy (Russian: Яков Петрович Шаховской; 8 October 1705 – 23 July 1777) was a Russian statesman.

Prince Yakov Shakhovskoy was born in the family of Prince Pyotr Ivanovich Shakhovskoy, who died when Yakov was several months old. His mother remarried twice, but the names of her husbands are unknown. From the age of 9 years Yakov was brought up by his uncle, Prince Aleksey Shakhovskoy, who was at this time a guard officer. He started his military service in 1720 as a soldier of the Leib-Guard Semyonovsky Regiment. In 1725 he became a first lieutenant and in the reign of Peter II was promoted to captain. In 1730 he was transferred to the Сavalry guards.

In the middle of 1730s Yakov Shakhovsky served under his uncle, who governed Malorossia from December 1731, and on his behalf often personally reported to Empress Anna Ioanovna and Duke Biron on the Ukrainian affairs.

After the deaths of his uncle in April 1737, Shakhovsky was forced to leave the civil service and took part in the Russo-Turkish War with the Leib-Guard Сavalry regiment. He fought in the Ochakov, Dnieper and Khotin operations under command of Burkhard Christoph von Munnich.

During the regency of Biron and the short reign of Empress Anna Leopoldovna, the position of Shakhovskoy was precarious, although he was the Head of Police and senator for a short time. When Empress Elizabeth of Russia usurped the throne, all the protectors of Shakhovsky were arrested and he was forced to retire, yet the patronage of Prince Nikita Trubetskoy helped him secure the position of the General-Prosecutor of the Most Holy Synod.

Shakhovsky gained reputation as the most exacting prosecutor in decades and earned the animosity of many powerful clerics, who entreated Elizabeth to remove Shakhovskoy from his post. However, he presided over the Holy Synod for 12 years. For his integrity he was rewarded with the rank of Privy Counsellor and orders of Alexander Nevsky and of St. Anna.

On 29 May 1753 he became General-krigskomissar and at this post strictly controlled state expenditures during the Seven Years' War. On 15 August 1760, Shakhovskoy become the General-Prosecutor and simultaneously the Conference-minister. On 25 December 1761 Emperor Peter III, who just assumed the throne, fired Shakhovskoy from his post. The short reign of Peter III ended with a coup d'etat, and Catherine II returned Shakhovsky for the service, appointing him a senator. On the day of her coronation the Empress granted to him the Order of St. Andrew.

On 1 April 1766 Yakov Shakhovsky laid down his offices and settled in Moscow. His stormy life, rich with events, is the subject of his interesting "Notes", which were for the first time published in 1810.

Preceded by Nikita Trubetskoy	General-Prosecutor of Russia; 1760 – 1761	Succeeded by Aleksandr Glebov
Preceded by Vasily Saltykov	Governor of Saint Petersburg; 1740	Succeeded by Vasily Nesvitsky
