= Peter Obolyaninov =

Peter Khrisanfovich Obolyaninov
- Пётр Хрисанфович Обольянинов
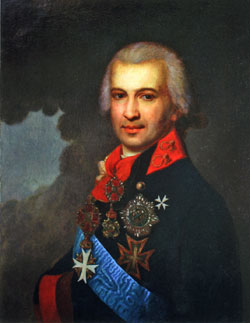
- Born: 1752
- Died: September 22, 1841 (aged 88–89); Moscow, Russian Empire
- Citizenship: Russian Empire
- Occupation: civil service
- Father: Khrisanf Efimovich Obolyaninov
- Awards: Order of St. Andrew; Order of Saint Vladimir; Order of Saint Alexander Nevsky; Order of Saint Anna; Order of St. Lazarus of Jerusalem

Peter Khrisanfovich Obolyaninov (1752 – September 22, 1841) was a favorite of Paul I, the General of the Infantry, in 1800–01 he was a prosecutor-general. For 16 years, from 1816 to 1832 (longer than anyone else), he served as Marshal of Nobility of the Moscow Governorate. In memory of him the manor Obolyaninovo was named.

== Biography ==
Born in the family of a poor Porkhov nobleman in 1752. Up to 16 years he lived with his parents in a village where he did not receive a systematic education:

By nature, Obolyaninov was a very intelligent man, with quick consideration, but he was little learned, so he barely knew how to write. He did not know foreign languages, did not speak and did not even understand, and in general did not like anything foreign. The character was cool, honest, noble, but harsh and very persistent.

— Elizaveta Yankova

Military service began in 1768. He immediately stood out diligent performance of duties and unquestioning obedience to the orders of the higher authorities. With the rank of prime major, he retired in 1780; for several years he did not serve anywhere, living in his village. From 1783 – provincial solicitor in the Pskov governorship; in a few years – advisor in the civil court; in 1792 he received the rank of court councillor and was appointed to the post in the State Chamber.

Possessing ambition, he bothered to be transferred to the army; civil service did not satisfy the ambitions of Peter Obolyaninov. In 1793 he entered the Gatchina troops in the rank of lieutenant colonel. Serving in Gatchina, he won the favor of Grand Duke Pavel Petrovich, after whose accession to the throne in 1796 his favor began.

=== Timeserver ===
In 1796, Peter Khrisanfovich, already in the rank of major general, was appointed provisionmaster-general, awarded the Order of Saint Anna and the Order of Saint Alexander Nevsky. After the accession of Paul, he became one of the closest confidants of the emperor; the royal favors followed one after another: in 1797 he was granted an estate in the Saratov province with 2 thousand souls, the next year he was promoted, became a lieutenant general, in 1799 he was appointed senator. The French king Louis XVIII granted him the commander's cross of the Order of Saint Lazarus of Jerusalem.

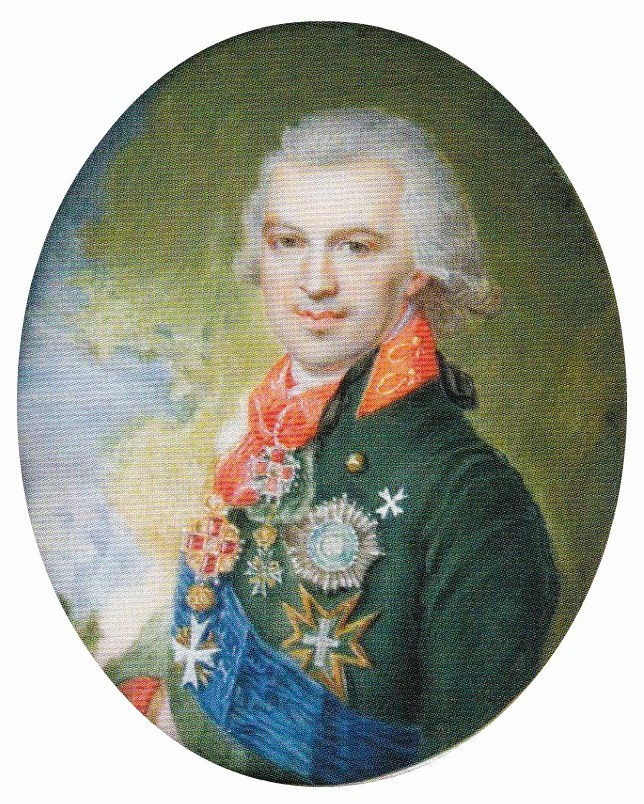
Prosecutor General Peter Obolyaninov

In February 1800, he took the post of procurator-general; in this position he did not stay long, until the coup of March 11, 1801. For this year of service he was generously rewarded: granted a large cross of the Order of St. John of Jerusalem, the Order of St. Andrew, a large house in the capital, an imperial snuffbox with diamonds, porcelain and silver sets for 120 thousand rubles; was promoted to General of the Infantry. Pavel considered Obolyaninov "his". The competence of the procurator-general, which at the time was exceptionally broad, Obolyaninov tried to further expand, demanding, for example, from the Senate Chief Prosecutors, preliminary reports to him; at the same time, Pavel expanded it, ordering everyone to deliver his reports to Obolyaninov in general. Without mental and moral culture, deprived of at least practical service experience, Obolyaninov could hold in his post only with unquestioning obedience and precise performance. He never objected to the emperor, blindly following the commands; in affairs the arbitrariness was established.

The heavy orders of the Pavlovian regime Obolyaninov aggravated by rudeness and aroused general hostility. The lack of upbringing and education affected the work at the highest post: he often scolded his subordinates, not being embarrassed in expressions; wrote with errors, distorting the name. However, he had the talent for staffing intelligent people in key positions. In the words of Dmitry Mertvago, Obolyaninov's colleague, Peter Khrisanfovich "became like a great Vizier" under the sovereign. The emperor Paul instructed him to take the oath of his sons Alexander and Konstantin on the memorable day of March 11, 1801. On the night of the same day, during the coup, Obolyaninov was arrested, and although he was immediately released, his career ended; a few days later he went to Moscow. Here, at first, he was forbidden even to visit a noble assembly, where Field Marshal Kamensky publicly called him "a state thief, a bribe taker, a fool stuffed".

=== Retired life ===
Before the invasion of the French, the Obolyaninovs lived openly in Moscow, receiving many guests. Obolyaninov managed to attract Moscow society with dinners and more than once he was elected the Marshal of Nobility. In this post, he even showed civil courage in 1826, raising his voice for the mitigation of punishment to Muscovite Decembrist Prince Yevgeny Obolensky, who was originally sentenced to the death penalty, then replaced by hard labor.

In the fire of 1812, Obolyaninov's Moscow house on the corner of Tverskaya and Sadovaya streets, with a large garden and two outbuildings, burned down and was never really renewed. The couple moved to Obolyaninovo, situated near Moscow, where an elderly general engaged in the cultivation of flowers, and his wife became interested in dog breeding. According to the testimony of the mistress of the neighboring estate:

Obolyaninov's face was very ugly: thin, big onion nose, sunken eyes with a stern look, hair very sparse on the whole head and cut out so tightly that it was impossible to catch it. He would have been rather tall if he had not kept himself bent; I think it was from habit, and in his old age, when he could not walk, and he was carried around the rooms in the armchairs, his head bent down so that he was almost on his knees.

The death of his wife had such a strong effect on Obolyaninov that he "slept on her bed until his death, on her pillows and was covered with the blanket under which she died". He himself died in the ninetieth year on September 22, 1841, in Moscow, in his house on Tverskaya. He was buried next to his wife in the Tver estate, in the parish church of the village of Tolozhnya, Novotorzhsky district.

== Matrimony ==
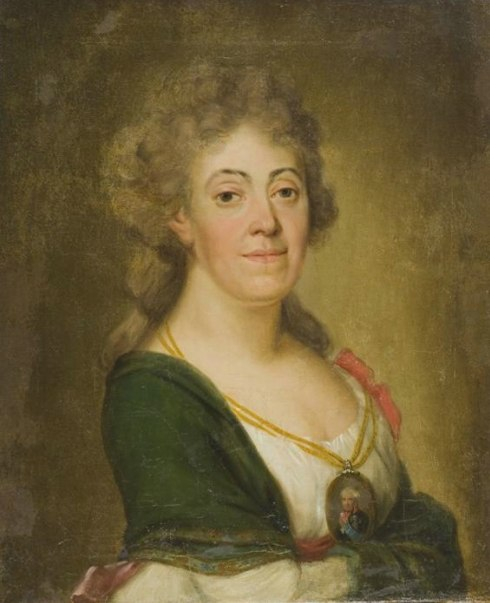
Portrait of Anna Aleksandrovna by Vladimir Borovikovsky

From January 19, 1795, he was married to Anna Alexandrovna Nashchokina, née Yermolayeva (1754–1822), widow of court counselor Yakov Ivanovich Ordin-Nashchokin (1728–1793); the daughter of Lieutenant Alexander Petrovich Ermolaev and Ekaterina Gavrilovna Belkina. In her youth, she was beautiful, distinguished by kindness and courtesy, but "very simple and without any education". Anna Alexandrovna told that when she married old Nashchokin, she tried to dress older than her years, and when she married Obolyaninov, she began to youth to appear younger.

According to the testimony of Elizabeth Yankova, "since she was a great hunter before the dogs she held, she was just talking about dogs"; at night, the little dogs sometimes occupied the entire bed of the hostess, so that she herself "somehow clung to the edge". On December 31, 1800, for the merits of her husband, she was granted to the cavalier ladies of the Order of Saint Catherine of the Small Cross. In the last years of her life, Anna Alexandrovna was bedridden. Since her second marriage was childless, Obolyaninovo near Moscow was inherited by Peter Khrisanfovich's nephew – Lieutenant Colonel Mikhail Mikhailovich Obolyaninov, whose daughter and heiress Anna married Count Adam Olsufyev.

== Sources ==
- Kolpakidi, Alexander (2010). Special services of the Russian Empire. Moscow: Yauza Eksmo. pp. 78–79. ISBN 978-5-699-43615-6.
