= Nikolay Muraviev =

Russian statesman and politician

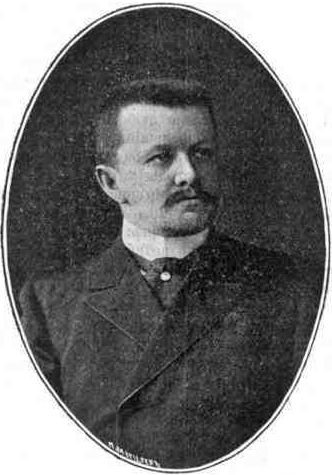

Minister of Justice
- In office July 1894 – 1905

Personal details
- Born: 1850
- Died: 1908 (aged 57–58)
- Education: University of Saint Petersburg; University of Moscow

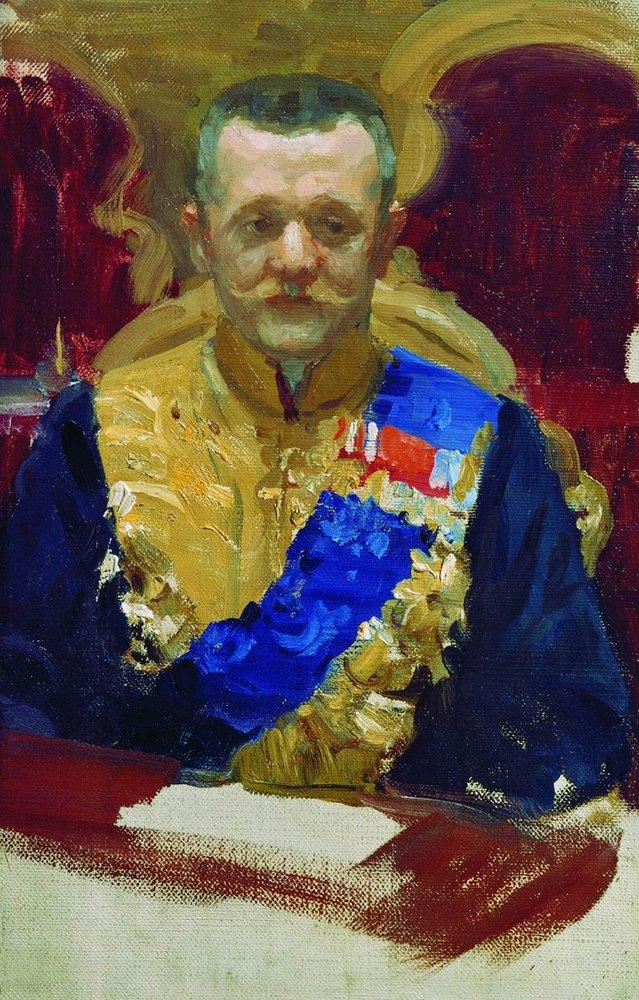
Nikolay Muraviev

Nikolay Valerianovich Muraviev or Muravyov (Russian: Никола́й Валериа́нович Муравьёв) (1850–1908) (anglicized Nicholas V. Muravev) was a Russian politician, nephew of the famed Count Nikolay Muravyov-Amursky, explorer and Governor General of the Russian Far East.

Muraviev was a graduate of both the University of Saint Petersburg and the University of Moscow. Early in his career he was a noted lecturer on criminal law at the University of Moscow and served in various positions within the judiciary. He came to prominence after successfully prosecuting the assassins of Emperor Alexander II.

In 1892 he was appointed Imperial Secretary. He served as Minister of Justice from 1894 to early 1905. He was appointed Ambassador to Italy in 1905 and served until his death in 1908.

He was married to Katharina Vasilyevna Slepzowa (1862-1929), who secondly married the German industrialist Prince Guido Henckel von Donnersmarck. (Source: Materialy dlya Istorii Dvoryanskikh Rodov Martynovykh i Sleptsovykh, by A. N. Nartsov. Tambov, 1904)

Political offices
| Preceded by Nikolay Manasein | Minister of Justice; July 1894 – 1905 | Succeeded by Sergey Manukhin |
