= Ivan Golubev =

Russian statesman

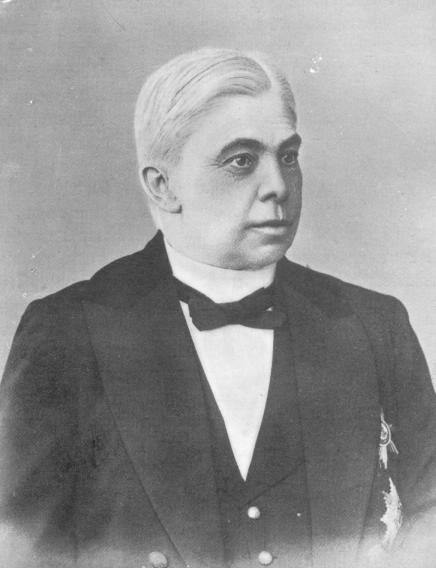
Ivan Golubev

Ivan Yakovlevich Golubev (Russian: Ива́н Я́ковлевич Го́лубев; 1841–1918) was a Russian statesman.

== Life ==
After graduating from the Imperial School of Law, he worked in the Chancellery of the Fourth Department of the Senate (1860–1864) and in the Ministry of Justice (1864–1866), where he participated in the drafting of the judicial reform of Alexander II.

Later, he served in the St. Petersburg District Court, the Senate, and the Ministry of Justice.

He was a member of the State Council (1895) and chairman of the Department for Civil and Ecclesiastical Affairs of the State Council (1905). He became vice-chairman of the State Council after its reorganization in 1906.

He opened the Second, Third, and Fourth State Dumas as the Tsar's representative.
