= Ivan Shcheglovitov =

Russian politician (1861–1918)

- Иван Григорьевич Щегловитов
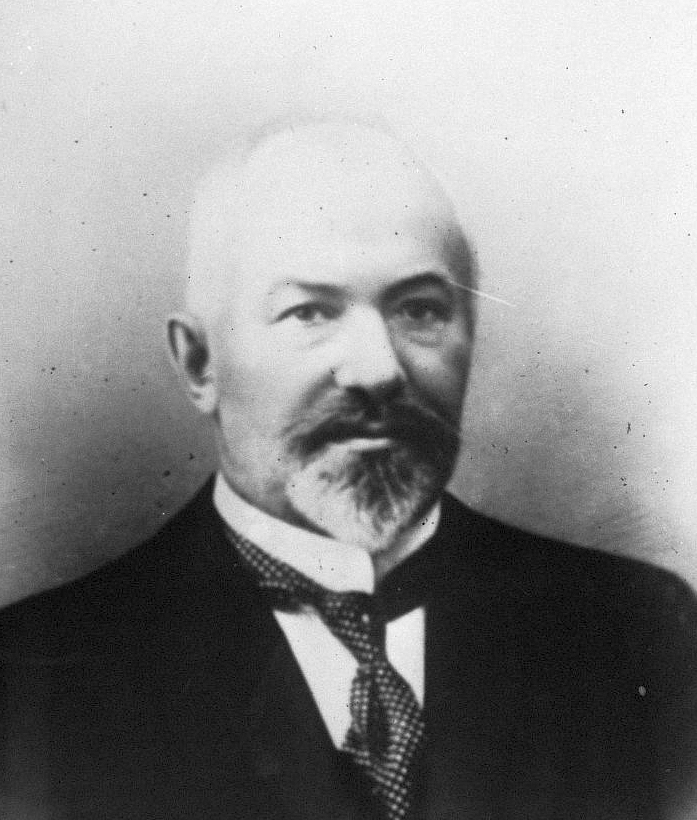

Chairman of the State Council
- In office 1 January 1917 – 1 March 1917
- Preceded by: Anatoly Kulomzin
- Succeeded by: Position abolished

Minister of Justice
- In office 24 April 1906 – 6 July 1915
- Preceded by: Mikhail Akimov
- Succeeded by: Aleksandr Khvostov

Personal details
- Born: 25 February [O.S. 13 February] 1861 Vaulets, Starodubsky Uyezd, Chernigov Governorate, Russian Empire
- Died: 5 September 1918 (aged 57) Moscow, Soviet Russia
- Party: Russian Assembly

Ivan Grigoryevich Shcheglovitov (Russian: Ива́н Григо́рьевич Щеглови́тов; 25 February [O.S. 13 February] 1861 – 5 September 1918) was a Russian politician who served as the minister of Justice and the last chairman of the State Council of the Russian Empire.

== Life ==
Graduate of the Imperial School of Law, he held various posts in the Senate and the Ministry of Justice between 1890 and 1905; Assistant Minister of Justice (1906), Minister of Justice (1906-1915), Member of the State Council (1907), and Chairman of the State Council (January 1917). Shcheglovitov was one of the main instigators of a notorious Blood libel case against Menachem Beilis in 1913.

After the February Revolution, he was imprisoned by the Bolsheviks in the Peter and Paul Fortress; later transferred to Moscow and executed by the Cheka during the period of Red Terror.

== Sources ==
- V.I. Gurko. Features And Figures Of The Past. Government And Opinion In The Reign Of Nicholas II.
- "В Стародубе появится памятник Ивану Щегловитову" [A monument to Ivan Shcheglovitov will appear in Starodub] (in Russian). 13 April 2020. Archived from the original on 27 February 2022.

Preceded by Mikhail Akimov	Minister of Justice; 24 April 1906 – 6 July 1915	Succeeded by Aleksandr Khvostov
Preceded by Anatoly Kulomzin	Chairman of the State Council; 1 January – 1 March 1917	Succeeded by position abolished
