= List of justice ministers of Russia =

This is a list of ministers of justice of Russia.

== Russian Empire ==
Minister	Term of Office		Emperor
Gavriil Derzhavin	8 September 1802	7 October 1803	Alexander I
Pyotr Lopukhin	8 October 1803	1 January 1810	Alexander I
Ivan Dmitriev	1 January 1810	30 August 1814	Alexander I
Dmitry Troshchinsky	30 August 1814	25 August 1817	Alexander I
Prince; Dmitry Lobanov-Rostovsky	25 August 1817	18 October 1827	Alexander I
Prince; Dmitry Lobanov-Rostovsky	25 August 1817	18 October 1827	Nicholas I
Prince; Alexey Dolgorukov	18 October 1827	20 September 1829	Nicholas I
Dmitry Dashkov	20 September 1829	14 February 1839	Nicholas I
Count; Dmitry Bludov	14 February 1839	31 December 1839	Nicholas I
Count; Viktor Panin	31 December 1839	21 October 1862	Nicholas I
Count; Viktor Panin	31 December 1839	21 October 1862	Alexander II
Dmitry Zamyatin	21 October 1862	18 April 1867	Alexander II
Prince; Sergey Urusov	18 April 1867	15 October 1867	Alexander II
Count; Konstantin Pahlen	18 April 1867	30 May 1878	Alexander II
Dmitry Nabokov	30 May 1878	6 November 1885	Alexander II
Dmitry Nabokov	30 May 1878	6 November 1885	Alexander III
Nikolay Manasein	6 November 1885	1 January 1894	Alexander III
Nikolay Muraviev	1 January 1894	14 January 1905	Alexander III
Nikolay Muraviev	1 January 1894	14 January 1905	Nicholas II
Sergey Manukhin	21 January 1905	16 December 1905	Nicholas II
Mikhail Akimov	16 December 1905	24 April 1906	Nicholas II
Ivan Shcheglovitov	24 April 1906	6 July 1915	Nicholas II
Aleksandr Khvostov	6 July 1915	7 July 1916	Nicholas II
Alexander Makarov	7 July 1916	20 December 1916	Nicholas II
Nikolay Dobrovolsky	20 December 1916	28 February 1917	Nicholas II

== Provisional Government/Russian Republic ==
Minister	Party	Term of Office		Prime Minister
Alexander Kerensky	Socialist Revolutionary Party	15 March 1917	18 May 1917	Georgy Lvov
Pavel Pereverzev	Labour Group	18 May 1917	19 July 1917	Georgy Lvov
Ivan Yefremov	Progressive Party	23 July 1917	6 August 1917	Alexander Kerensky
Alexander Zarudny	Popular Socialist Party	6 August 1917	15 September 1917	Alexander Kerensky
Alexander Demyanov	Popular Socialist Party	15 September 1917	8 October 1917	Alexander Kerensky
Pavel Malyantovich	Social Democratic Labour Party (Menshevik)	8 October 1917	7 November 1917	Alexander Kerensky

== Russian SFSR ==
Minister	Party	Term of Office		Head of State
Georgy Oppokov	Social Democratic Labour Party (Bolshevik)	8 November 1917	29 November 1917	Lev Kamenev
Pyotr Stuchka	Social Democratic Labour Party (Bolshevik)	29 November 1917	22 December 1917	Yakov Sverdlov
Isaac Steinberg	Party of Left Socialist-Revolutionaries	22 December 1917	18 March 1918	Yakov Sverdlov
Pyotr Stuchka	Communist Party	18 March 1918	14 September 1918	Yakov Sverdlov
Dmitry Kursky	Communist Party	14 September 1918	16 January 1928	Yakov Sverdlov
Dmitry Kursky	Communist Party	14 September 1918	16 January 1928	Mikhail Vladimirsky
Dmitry Kursky	Communist Party	14 September 1918	16 January 1928	Mikhail Kalinin
Nikolai Janson	Communist Party	16 January 1928	6 March 1931	Mikhail Kalinin
Nikolai Krylenko	Communist Party	5 May 1931	20 July 1936	Mikhail Kalinin
Ivan Bulat	Communist Party	20 July 1936	31 August 1937	Mikhail Kalinin
Vladimir Antonov-Ovseyenko	Communist Party	15 September 1937	11 October 1937	Mikhail Kalinin
Yakov Dmitriyev	Communist Party	17 October 1937	25 January 1940	Mikhail Kalinin
Yakov Dmitriyev	Communist Party	17 October 1937	25 January 1940	Aleksei Badayev
Konstantin Gorshenin	Communist Party	25 January 1940	12 November 1943	Aleksei Badayev
Ivan Basavin	Communist Party	5 January 1944	5 October 1949	Aleksei Badayev
Ivan Basavin	Communist Party	5 January 1944	5 October 1949	Nikolai Shvernik
Ivan Basavin	Communist Party	5 January 1944	5 October 1949	Ivan Vlasov
Fyodor Belayev	Communist Party	5 October 1949	11 June 1953	Ivan Vlasov
Fyodor Belayev	Communist Party	5 October 1949	11 June 1953	Mikhail Tarasov
Anatoly Rubichev	Communist Party	11 June 1953	27 March 1957	Mikhail Tarasov
Vladimir Boldyrev	Communist Party	11 May 1957	13 April 1963	Mikhail Tarasov
Vladimir Boldyrev	Communist Party	11 May 1957	13 April 1963	Nikolai Ignatov
Vladimir Boldyrev	Communist Party	11 May 1957	13 April 1963	Nikolai Organov
Vladimir Boldyrev	Communist Party	11 May 1957	13 April 1963	Nikolai Ignatov
Alexey Kruglov	Communist Party	13 April 1963	24 September 1970	Nikolai Ignatov
Alexey Kruglov	Communist Party	13 April 1963	24 September 1970	Mikhail Yasnov
Vladimir Blinov	Communist Party	24 September 1970	15 February 1984	Mikhail Yasnov
Alexander Sukharev	Communist Party	15 March 1984	25 February 1988	Mikhail Yasnov
Alexander Sukharev	Communist Party	15 March 1984	25 February 1988	Vladimir Orlov
Vladimir Abolentsev	Communist Party	5 April 1988	14 July 1990	Vladimir Orlov
Vladimir Abolentsev	Communist Party	5 April 1988	14 July 1990	Vitaly Vorotnikov
Vladimir Abolentsev	Communist Party	5 April 1988	14 July 1990	Boris Yeltsin
Nikolay Fyodorov	Communist Party	14 July 1990	25 December 1991	Boris Yeltsin

== Russian Federation ==
Minister	Party	Term of Office		President
Nikolay Fyodorov	Independent	25 December 1991	24 March 1993	Boris Yeltsin
Yury Kalmykov	Independent	24 March 1993	7 December 1994	Boris Yeltsin
Valentin Kovalev	Independent	5 January 1995	2 July 1997	Boris Yeltsin
Sergei Stepashin	Independent	2 July 1997	29 March 1998	Boris Yeltsin
Pavel Krasheninnikov	Independent	29 March 1998	17 August 1999	Boris Yeltsin
Yury Chaika	Independent	17 August 1999	23 June 2006	Boris Yeltsin
Yury Chaika	Independent	17 August 1999	23 June 2006	Vladimir Putin
Vladimir Ustinov	Independent	23 June 2006	12 May 2008	Vladimir Putin
Alexander Konovalov	United Russia	12 May 2008	21 January 2020	Dmitry Medvedev
Alexander Konovalov	United Russia	12 May 2008	21 January 2020	Vladimir Putin
Konstantin Chuychenko	United Russia	21 January 2020	Incumbent	Vladimir Putin

== See also ==
- Justice Minister
- Russian Council of Ministers
- Prosecutor General of Russia
