= Sergey Manukhin =

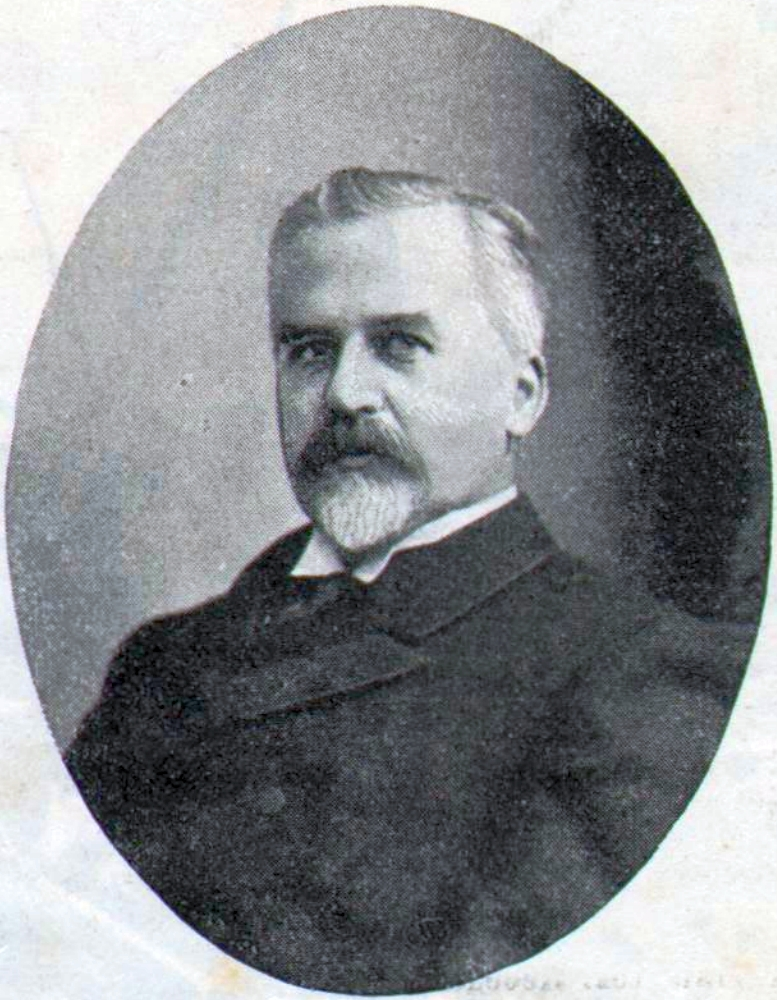
Sergey Manukhin, 1905

Sergey Sergeevich Manukhin (1856–1922) was a politician from the Russian Empire.

After graduating from the University of Saint Petersburg, he entered the Ministry of Justice. He served in the position of Director of the Ministry's First Department and Assistant Minister of Justice. In 1905 he briefly served as Minister of Justice in the Witte government. He left that post just prior to Witte's resignation after accusations of not being firm or energetic enough in the face of widespread disorders following the disastrous Russo-Japanese War of 1904–1905. He was appointed to the Imperial State Council in 1905.

Preceded by Nikolay Muraviev	Minister of Justice; 1905	Succeeded by Mikhail Akimov
