= Viktor Nikitich Panin =

Russian politician

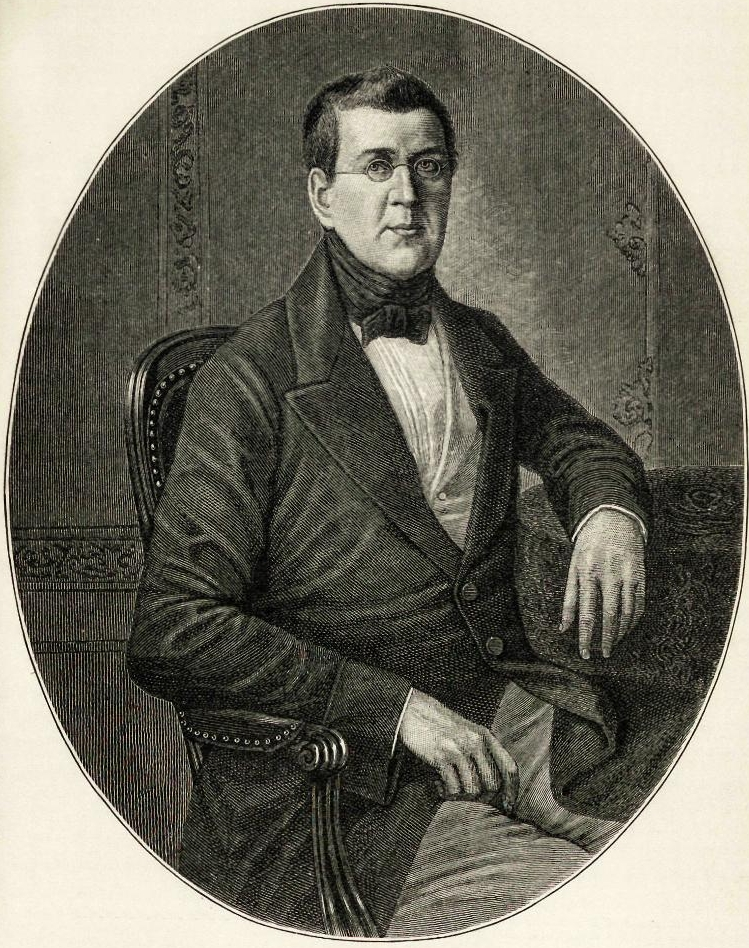
Panin Viktor Nikitich

Count Viktor Nikitich Panin (Russian: Ви́ктор Ники́тич Па́нин; 9 April (28 March Old Style) 1801 Moscow – 13 April (1 April Old Style) 1862 Nice) was conservative Russian Minister of Justice (1841–1862). He was the younger son of Count Nikita Petrovich Panin by Countess Sofia Vladimirovna Orlova.

His granddaughter, Sofia Panina was a philanthropist who became active in the Constitutional Democratic Party following the February Revolution. She was subjected to a political trial following the Bolshevik seizure of power in the October Revolution.

Preceded by Dmitry Bludov	Minister of Justice; 1841 – 1862	Succeeded by Dmitry Zamyatin
