= Mikhail Akimov =

Russian politician (1847–1915)

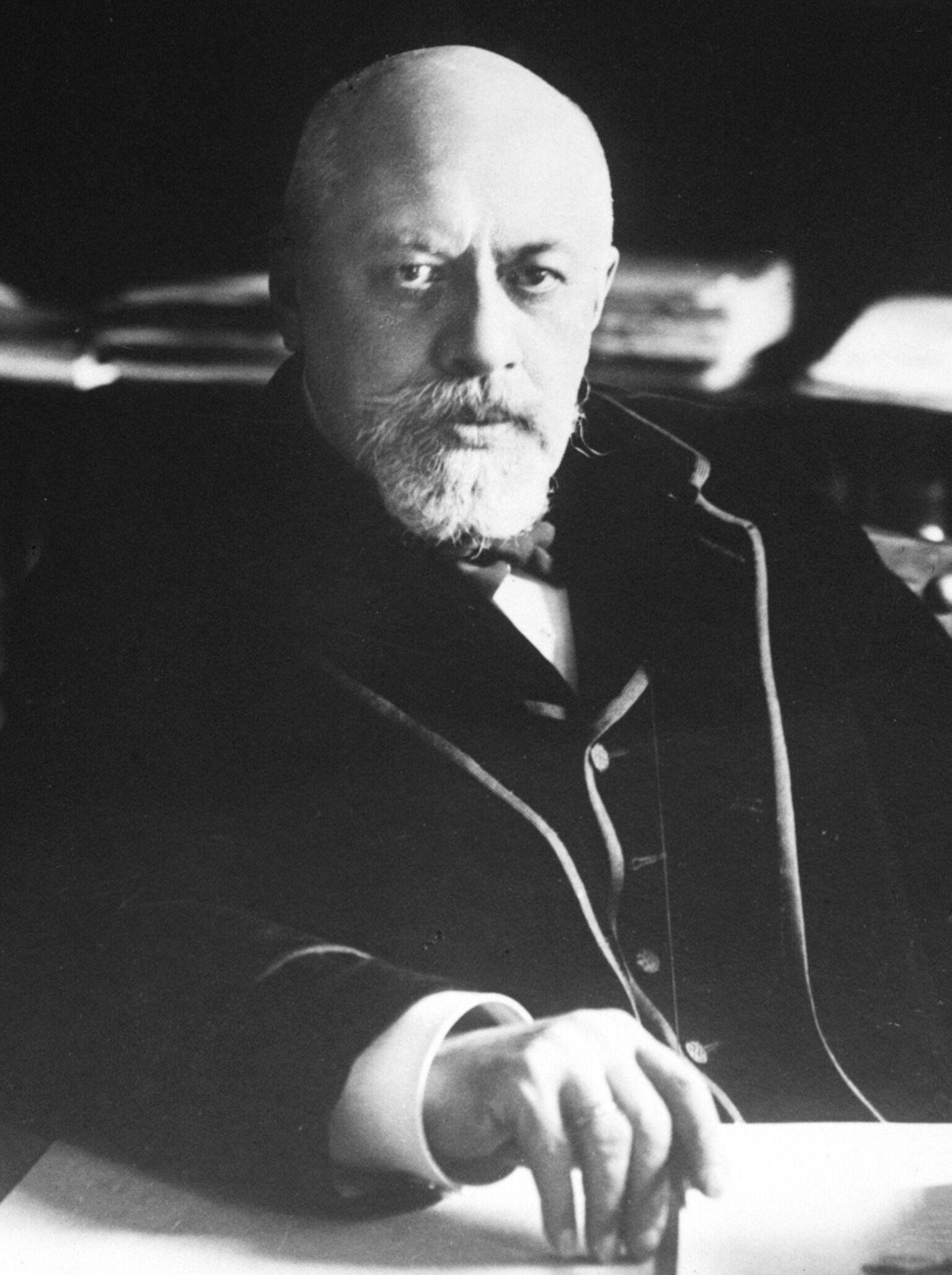
- Mikhaïl Akimov in 1914
- Born: November 8, 1847
- Died: August 9, 1914 (aged 66)
- Education: Imperial Moscow University (1869)

Mikhail Grigoroevich Akimov (Russian: Михаи́л Григо́рьевич Аки́мов; 1847–1915) was a Russian politician. After graduating from the University of Moscow, he entered the Ministry of Justice. He served as an Assistant Public Prosecutor in Kiev in 1881. It is known that he was on the roster of Senators in December 1905, because the Chairman of the Council of Ministers, Sergei Witte, chose him to be the successor of Sergey Manukhin from that list. He served as Minister of Justice in the Witte government for the remainder of Witte's tenure (April 1906). He was appointed to the Imperial State Council in 1906. He was eventually chosen as the Chairman of the Imperial State Council.

== Bibliography ==
- Imperial Moscow University: 1755-1917: encyclopedic dictionary. Moscow: Russian political encyclopedia (ROSSPEN). 2010. pp. 16–17. ISBN 978-5-8243-1429-8 – via A. Andreev, D. Tsygankov.

Preceded by Sergey Manukhin	Minister of Justice; 1905–1906	Succeeded by Ivan Shcheglovitov
