= Sophie Stroganova =

Russian noblewoman (1775–1845)

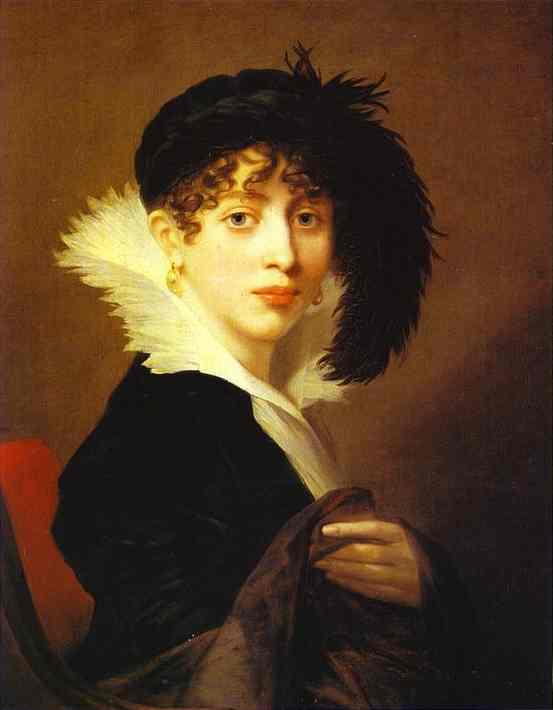
Portrait by Jean-Laurent Mosnier, 1808

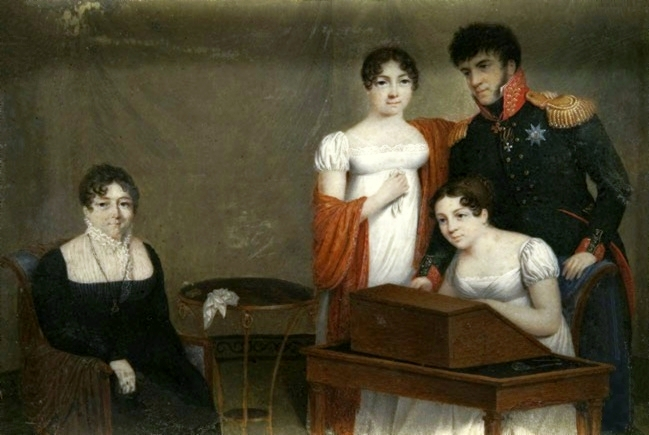
Golitsyn family by Vladimir Borovikovsky (1810), National Museum in Warsaw

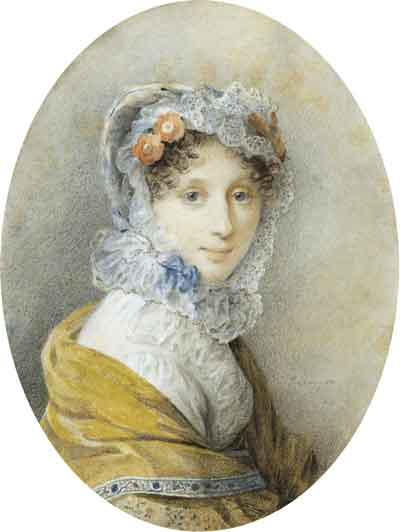
Portrait by Pyotr F. Sokolov (c. 1819)

Countess Sophie Vladimirovna Stroganova (Russian: Софья Владимировна Строганова, romanized: Sofya Vladimirovna Stroganova), née Golitsyna (Russian: Голицына; 11 November 1775, Moscow – 3 March 1845, St Petersburg), was a Russian noblewoman.

== Early life ==
Sophie was born in Moscow on 11 November 1775. She was a daughter of Prince Vladimir Borisovich Golitsyn and his wife Natalya Petrovna. Among her siblings were Prince Boris Vladimirovitch Golitsyn, Princess Ekaterina Vladimirovna Apraksina (who married Stepan Stepanovich Apraksin), and Prince Dmitry Golitsyn (who married Tatiana Vasilyevna Vasilchikova).

Sophie received a wide education and spoke perfect French. After their return to Russia following the French Revolution, they lived in the city in winter and in summer they lived on Viaziomy Manor, 40 km to the west of Moscow.

== Career ==
She translated Dante's Divine Comedy into Russian and became a lady in waiting at court as well as a close friend to the German-born empress Elizabeth Alexeievna. She rebuilt and embellished Maryino Estate near Andrianovo and Saint Petersburg and had Alexandre Teplaoukhov design a park for it. After the deaths of her husband and only son, she inherited most of the Stroganov residences and estates, which she rebuilt or embellished on advice from the architect Pyotr Sharov, whose admission to the Saint Petersburg Academy of Fine Arts she had ensured and whose studies she financed. She also founded a school for agriculture, landscape art and forestry in Saint Petersburg (1823–1844) and set up a pension fund for her servants and workers.

She took part in the Scientific and Economic Society, known for its liberal ideals, and designed a gold medal for its competitions. A bust of her was installed in the society's main hall in 1837. She also rebuilt Maryino Castle in Nizhny Novgorod Governorate and in 1824 rebuilt the whole riverfront section of the town of Nizhny Novgorod with stone buildings and a grid plan designed by her - the town had belonged to the Stroganovs since the 17th century.

== Personal life ==
On 6 May 1793, she married Count Pavel Alexandrovich Stroganov, a son of Alexander Sergeyevich Stroganov and, his second wife, Princess Ekaterina Petrovna Trubetskaya (daughter of Prince Peter Nikitich Trubetskoy). They had five children:

- Alexandre Pavlovitch Stroganov (1794–1814), who was killed at the Battle of Craonne during the War of the Sixth Coalition.
- Natalia Pavlovna Stroganova (1796–1872), sole heir to the Stroganov estates; she married her cousin Count Sergei Grigoryevich Stroganov (1794–1882) in 1818.
- Adelaïda Pavlovna Stroganova (1799–1882), who inherited Maryino Estate from her mother in 1845; she married Prince Vassili Sergueïevitch Golitsyn (1794–1836) in 1821.
- Elizaveta Pavlovna Stroganova (1802–1863), who married Prince Ivan Dmitrievitch Saltykov (1797–1832).
- Olga Pavlovna Stroganova (1808–1837), who married Count Pavel Karlovitch Fersen (1800–1884).

She died on 3 March 1845 in St Petersburg. On her death all her lands and the title of count passed to her eldest daughter Nathalie Pavlovna's husband Sergei Grigoryevich Stroganov (1794–1882), an art collector and patron and son of Baron Grigori Stroganov (1770–1857).

== Sources ==
- http://ru.rodovid.org/wk/Запись:175763
