= Vladimir Borisovich Golitsyn =

Russian statesman (1731–1798)

Prince Vladimir Borisovich Golitsyn
- Владимир Борисович Голицын
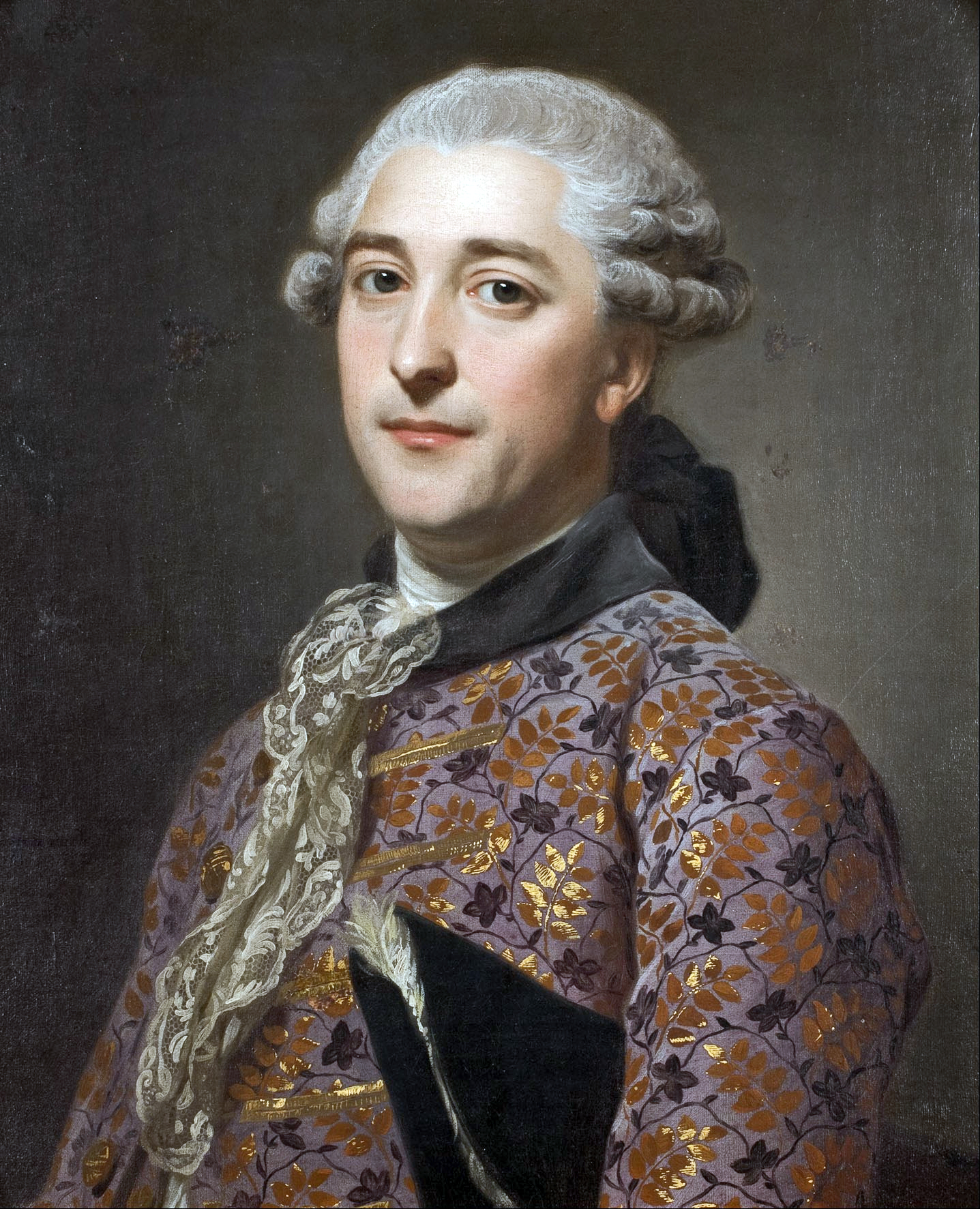
- Portrait of Prince Golitsyn by Alexander Roslin, 1762
- Born: 10 June 1731
- Died: 25 December 1798 (aged 67); Moscow, Russia
- Spouse: Countess Natalya Chernyshyova (after 1766)
- Children: 5, including Boris, Ekaterina, Dmitry and Sophie
- Parents: Boris Vasilevich Golitsyn (father); Ekaterina Ivanovna Strešneva (mother)

Prince Vladimir Borisovich Golitsyn (Russian: Владимир Борисович Голицын; 21 June [O.S. 10 June] 1731 – 5 January 1799 [O.S. 25 December 1798]) was a Russian statesman.

== Early life ==
21 June 1731. He was the son of Admiral Prince Boris Vasilevich Golitsyn (1705–1769) and his wife Ekaterina Ivanovna Strešneva (or Streshneva).

His father was the grandson of Prince Boris Alekseyevich Golitsyn, the uncle of Emperor Peter I. His grand-uncle was Prince Vasily Lukich Dolgorukov. His mother was the granddaughter, and sole heiress, of the first Governor-General of Moscow Tikhon Streshnev.

== Career ==
Prince Golitsyn took part in the Russo-Turkish War, retiring with the rank of Brigadier. Reportedly, he was a simple-minded man with a poorly managed large fortune. Following his marriage, his wife began to manage their household, quickly putting it in order and significantly increasing it.

In 1783, the Golitsyns left for France, traveling extensively around Europe. From 1786 to 1790, their sons attended a Parisian military school. After the start of the French Revolution, they traveled from London to their large mansion on the Rue Saint-Florentin, Paris, before returning to Russia in the autumn of 1790 at the insistence of the Empress. Upon their return, the family established itself in St Petersburg, and their home became a well-known refuge for French monarchist émigrés.

== Personal life ==
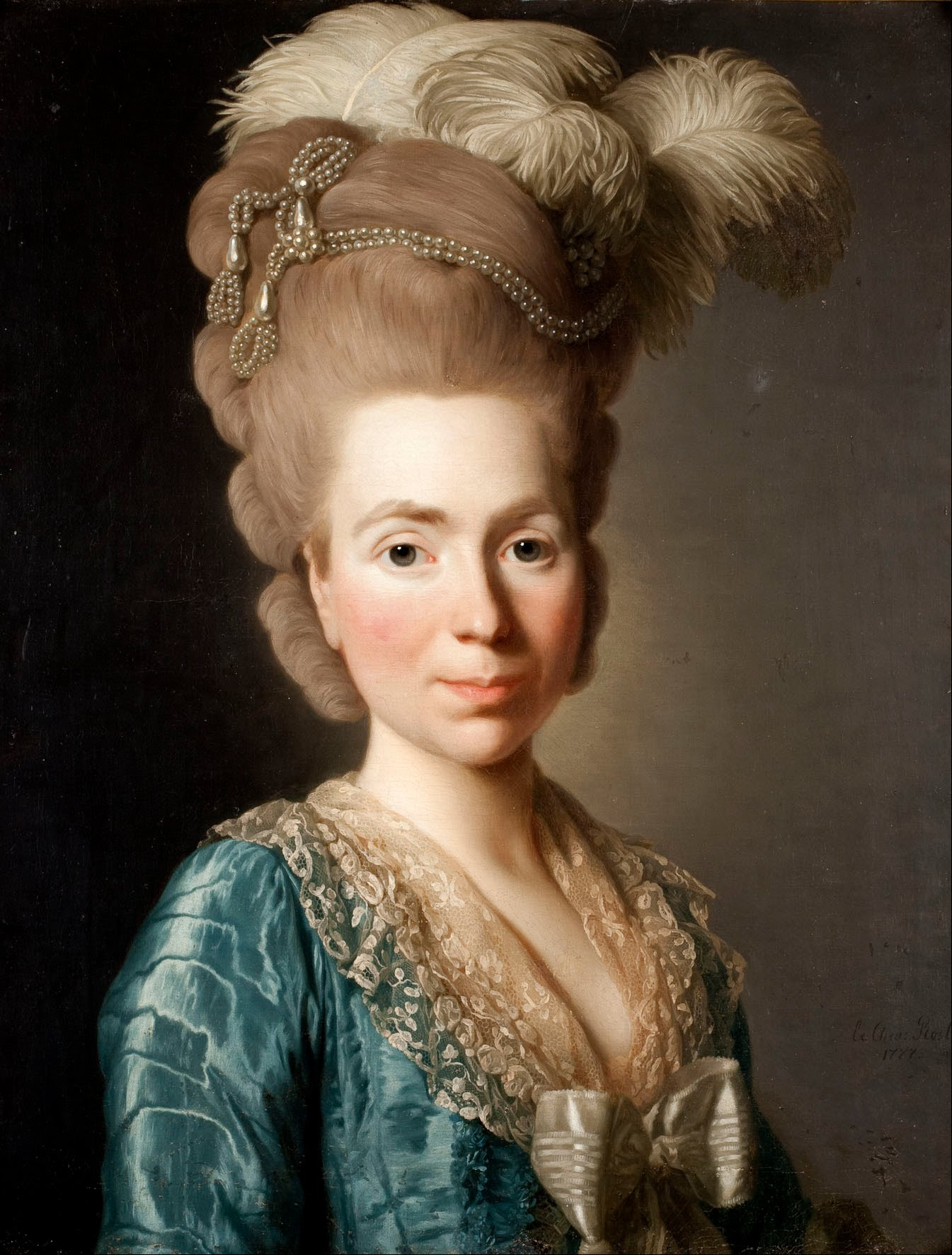
Portrait of his wife, Natalya Petrovna Golitsyna, by Alexander Roslin, 1777

In 1766 he married Countess Natalya Petrovna Chernyshyova, a lady in waiting to Catherine the Great. Natalya was the daughter of Ekaterina Andreyevna (daughter of Count Andrei Ushakov) and diplomat Pyotr Chernyshyov, who was serving as Ambassador to Margraviate of Brandenburg at the time of her birth. Together, Vladimir and Natalya had five children:

- Pyotr Vladimirovich Golitsyn (1767–1778), who died young.
- Boris Vladimirovich Golitsyn (1769–1813), who fought in the Patriotic War of 1812 died in Vilna of wounds he sustained at the Battle of Borodino.
- Ekaterina Vladimirovna Golitsyna (1770–1854), who married Stepan Stepanovich Apraksin, with whom she had five children.
- Dmitry Vladimirovich Golitsyn (1771–1844), who married Tatiana Vasilyevna Golitsyna, with whom he had five children.
- Sofia Vladimirovna Golitsyna (1775–1845), who married Pavel Alexandrovich Stroganov, with whom she had five children.

In winter they lived in the city; in summer they lived on Viaziomy Manor, 40 km to the west of Moscow. Around 1784, he reportedly commissioned the modernized architecture style of their "datcha".

Golitsyn died in Moscow on 25 December 1798 and was buried in the Donskoy Monastery in Moscow.

== Sources ==
- (in Russian) Серчевский Е. Записки о роде князей Голицыных. СПб, 1853, с. 107.
