= Alexander Sergeyevich Stroganov =

Russian aristocrat

Count Alexander Sergeyevich Stroganov
- Александр Сергеевич Строганов
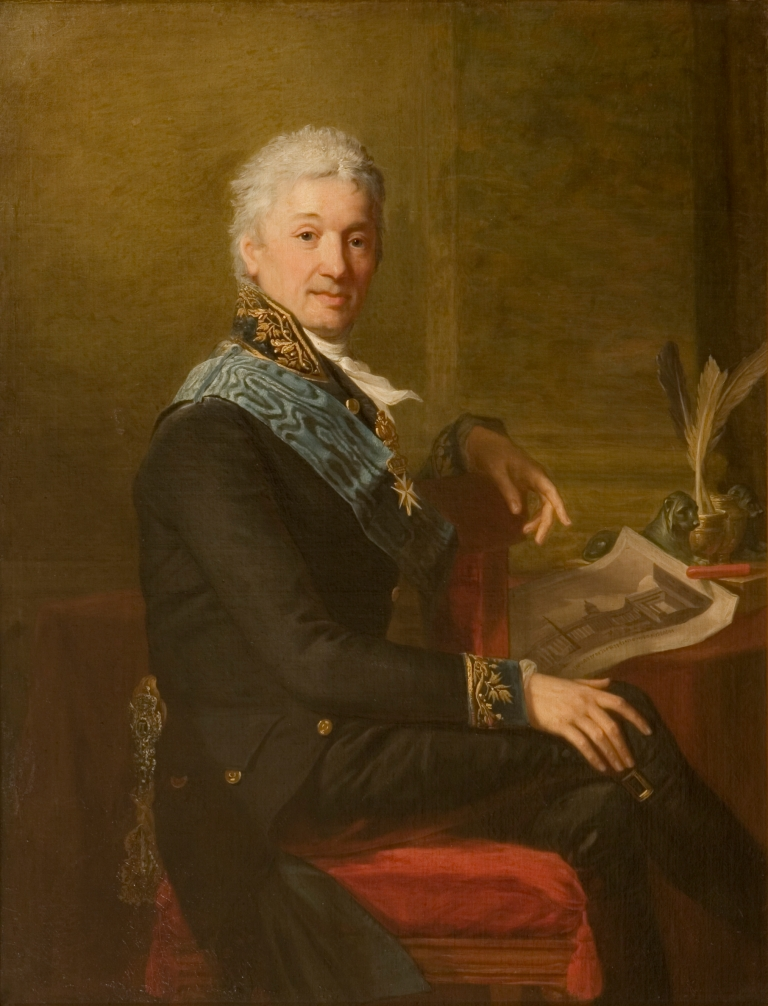
- Portrait by Jean-Laurent Mosnier, 1804
- Born: 3 January 1733
- Died: 27 September 1811 (aged 78)
- Resting place: Lazarevskoe Cemetery, St. Petersburg
- Occupations: Assistant to the Minister of the Interior, President of the Imperial Academy of Arts, director of the Russian Imperial Library, member of the Russian Academy
- Family: House of Stroganov

Count Alexander Sergeyevich Stroganov (Russian: Александр Сергеевич Строганов; 3 January 1733 – 27 September 1811) was a Russian aristocrat and a member of the Stroganov family. He was an assistant to the Minister of the Interior, a longtime President of the Imperial Academy of Arts, director of the Russian Imperial Library and a member of the Russian Academy.

== Early life ==
Stroganov was born on 3 January 1733 in Saint Petersburg, a son of baron Sergey Grigoryevich Stroganov (1707–1756), who played a significant role during the reign of Elizabeth Petrovna. During 1752–1757 he studied at the universities of Geneva, Bologna (art treasures), and Paris (chemistry, physics, and metallurgy). In Paris he was a Freemason and visited Voltaire.

== Career ==
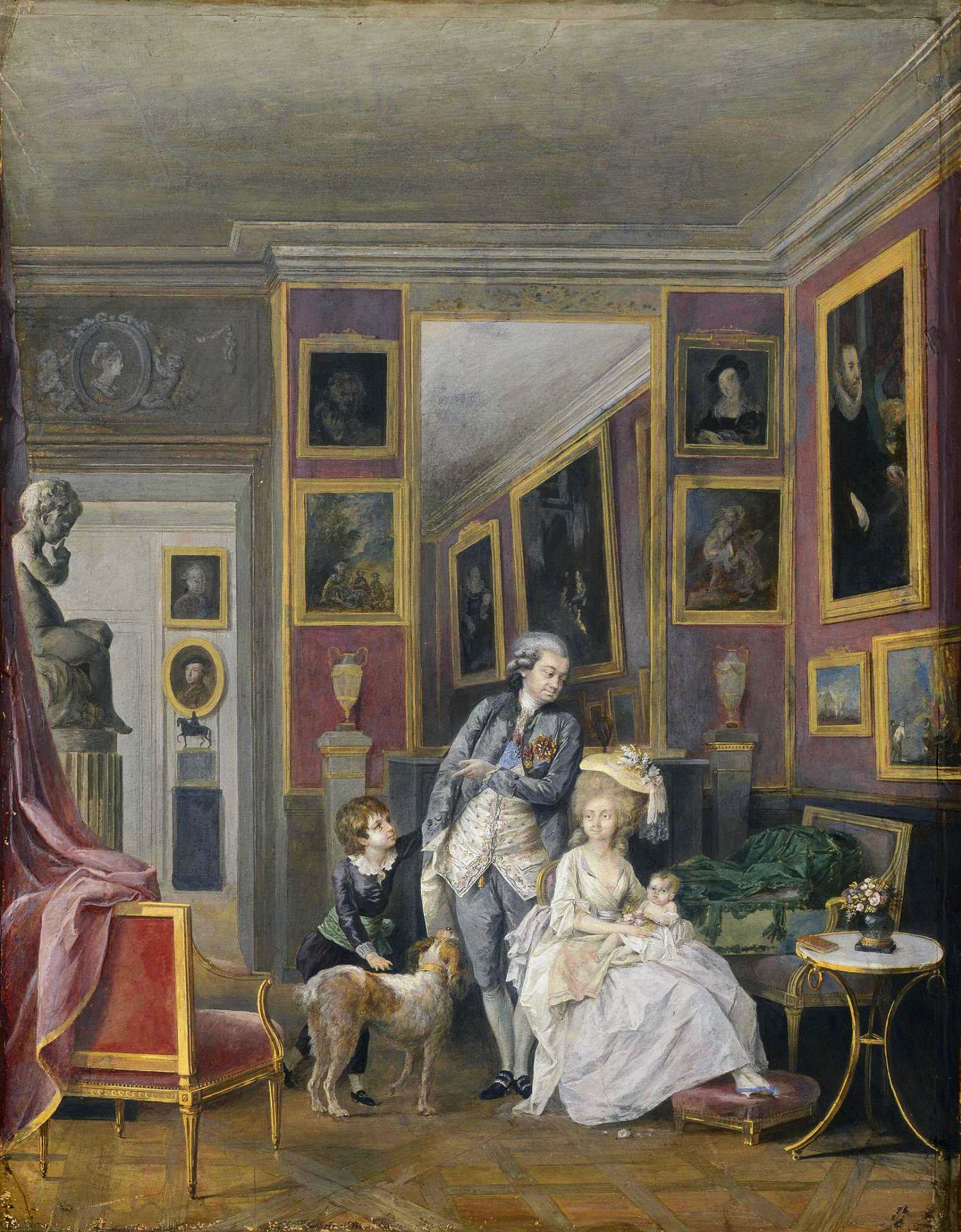
Stroganov with his wife and children, c. 1778

After the death of his father in 1756, he completed the decoration of the Stroganov Palace in 1760. In 1780, he became a Senator. In 1783 he became a member of the Russian Academy, and one of the editors of the Academic Dictionary.

Stroganov was a member of the commission on elaborating the new code of laws during the reign of Catherine the Great (1762–1796). From 1800 until his death he was a president of the Imperial Academy of Arts and director of the Imperial Public Library (1800–1811). He was the second director of the library (after Choiseul-Gouffier). He was also a member of the State Council.

From 1801 as chairman of a board of trustees, he was a supervisor of the Kazan Cathedral, St. Petersburg.

In 1805 he proposed to Alexander I the establishment of a special Manuscript Depository ("депо манускриптов") at the Imperial Library. Manuscripts taken from the collection of Peter P. Dubrovsky formed the basis of this depository.

Stroganov was also a collector of pictures of famous artists.

== Personal life ==
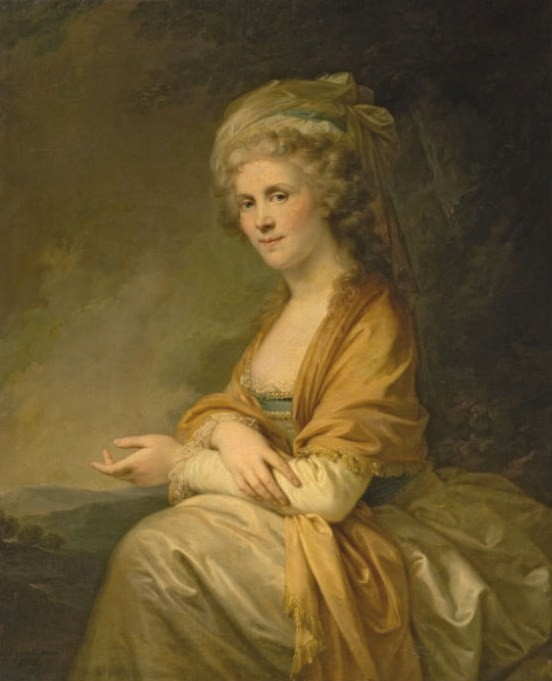
Portrait of his second wife, Princess Ekaterina Petrovna Trubetskaya

In 1769, he married Princess Ekaterina Petrovna Trubetskaya, a daughter of Prince Peter Nikitich Trubetskoy. Together, Ekaterina and Alexander were the parents of:

- Count Pavel Alexandrovich Stroganov (1774–1817), who married Princess Sophie Golitysn, a daughter of Prince Vladimir Borisovich Golitsyn and Natalya Petrovna.

He died on 27 September 1811 in Saint Petersburg.
