= Boris Golitsyn =

Boris Golitsyn may refer to:

- Boris Alexeyevich Galitzine (also transliterated Boris Alexeyevich Golitsyn, 1654–1715), (1654–1714), Russian aristocrat
- Boris Borisovich Golitsyn (1862–1916), Russian physicist
- Boris Vladimirovitch Golitsyn (1769–1813), Russian aristocrat
- Boris Andreevich Golitsyn (1766–1822), Russian nobleman
