= Natalya Golitsyna =

Russian noble

Princess Natalya Golitsyna
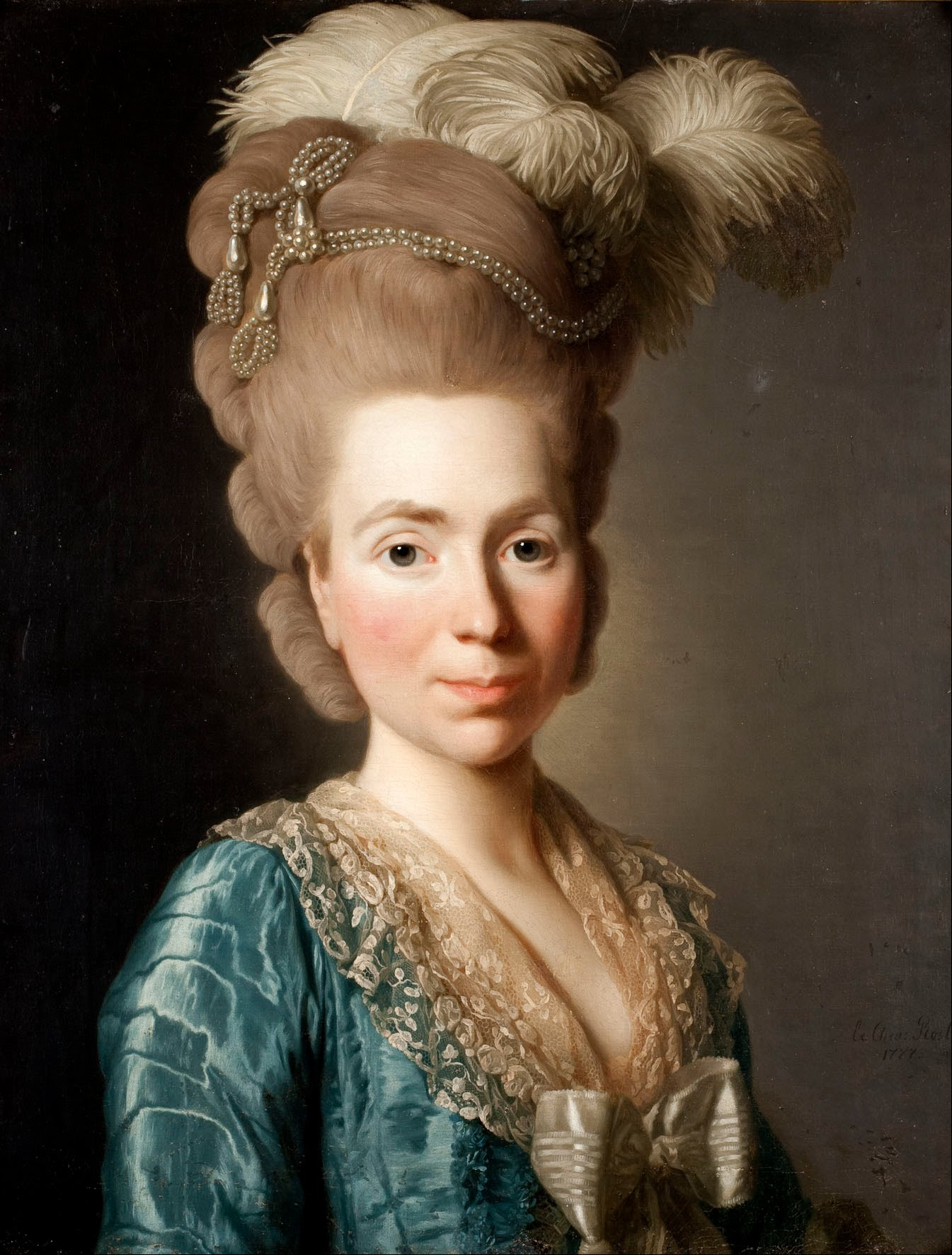
- Natalya Petrovna Golitsyna, in a 1777 portrait by Alexander Roslin
- Born: Countess Natalya Petrovna Chernyshyova; 28 January 1741; Berlin
- Died: 1 January 1838 (aged 96); Saint Petersburg, Russian Empire
- Spouse: Vladimir Borisovich Golitsyn (m. 1766; died 1798)
- Issue: Pyotr Vladimirovich Golitsyn; Boris Vladimirovich Golitsyn; Ekaterina Vladimirovna Apraksina; Dmitry Golitsyn; Sophie Stroganova
- Father: Piotr Chernyshev
- Mother: Ekaterina Andreevna Ushakova
- Occupation: Lady-in-waiting to Catherine the Great

Princess Natalya Petrovna Golitsyna (Russian: Наталья Петровна Голицына; née Chernyshyova (Чернышёва); 28 January 1741 – 1 January 1838 [O.S. 20 December 1837]) was a Russian noblewoman, lady-in-waiting, socialite, and Dame of the Order of St. Catherine's first degree.

Born into the noble Chernyshyov family, Natalya Petrovna was the daughter of the diplomat Pyotr Chernyshyov, ambassador to Berlin at the time of her birth. She moved with the family to London, following her father's duties as ambassador to the royal courts of Europe, and returned to Russia for periods. Appointed one of Empress Catherine the Great's maids of honour in 1762, she married Prince Vladimir Borisovich Golitsyn in 1766. Taking charge of the management of his estates, she greatly increased the family's fortunes, before the couple moved abroad with their family for their education. They settled in Paris, where Natalya became a darling of the French court, nicknamed the "Moscow Venus". Returning to Russia during the French Revolution, the family established itself in St Petersburg.

Princess Golitsyna continued her socialising, establishing a popular salon that became an important focal point of the court. She continued to receive the attentions of the Russian emperors, being awarded orders of nobility, and mixing with the highest echelons of society. Popular in public, though regarded as somewhat autocratic, she took especial care of her children, enforcing strict rules and standards of behaviour. Her influence and control over their lives was such that even in adult life they were afraid to sit in front of her, and she continued to manage the family estates and finances. Despite being Governor-General of Moscow, her son Dmitry had to have the Emperor intercede on his behalf for a raise in the allowance she gave him. In later life she became known in society as "Princesse Moustache" as her facial hair became more prominent. She was an inspiration for the countess in Alexander Pushkin's short story The Queen of Spades, another nickname that became attached to her. She died at the age of 96, having been a part of the Imperial court through the lives of five Emperors and Empresses.

== Family and early life ==
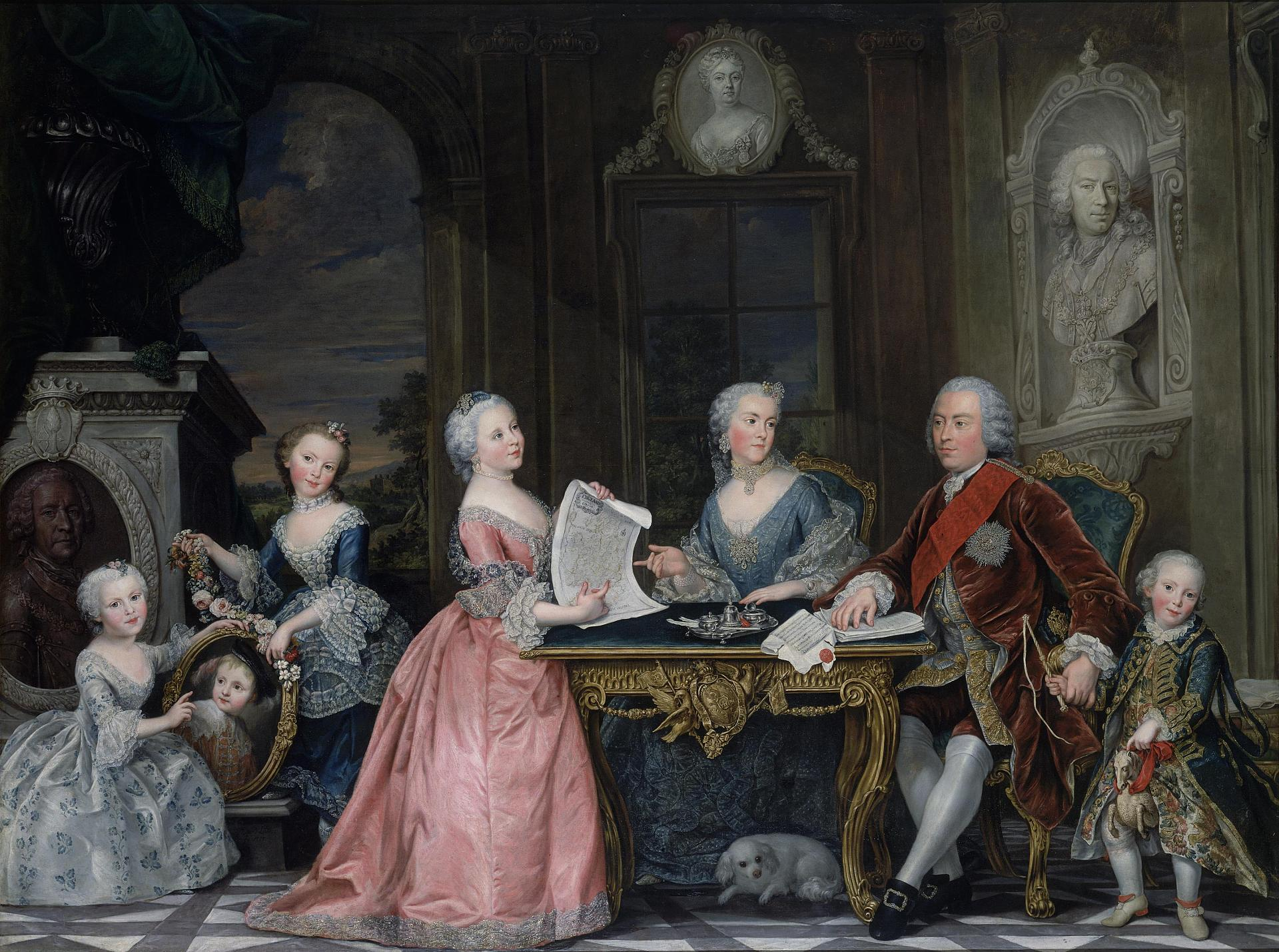
The Chernyshyov family in a 1750s portrait by David Lüders. Pyotr Chernyshyov with his wife Ekaterina Andreyevna and their daughters Anna, Darya and Natalya, and their son Grigory.

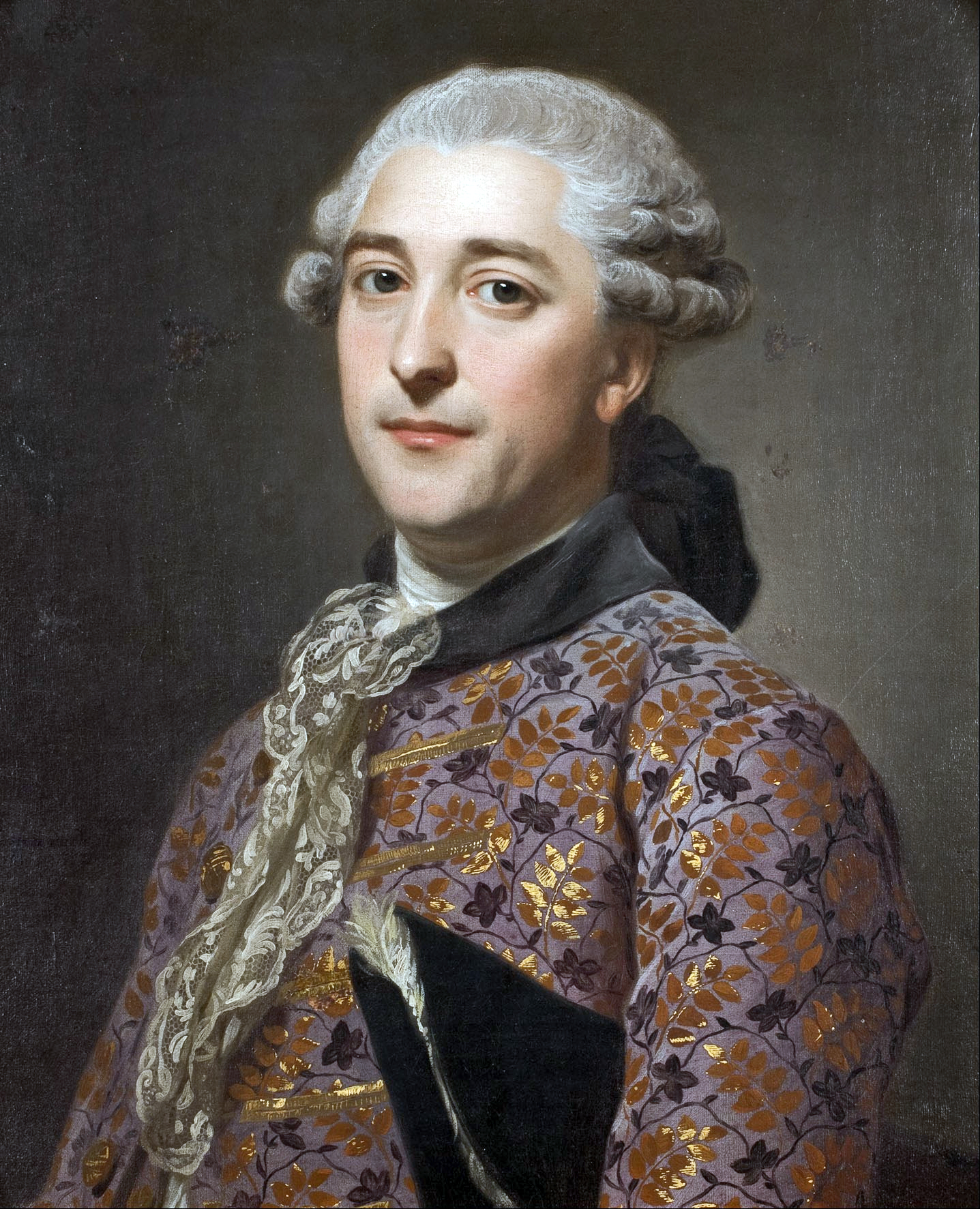
Natalya's husband, Prince Vladimir Borisovich Golitsyn, in a 1762 portrait by Alexander Roslin

Natalya was born in Berlin on 28 January 1741, the second daughter of Count Pyotr Chernyshyov, diplomat and ambassador to the Margraviate of Brandenburg. Her mother was Ekaterina Andreyevna, daughter of a famous chief of the secret office in Biron, Count Andrei Ivanovich Ushakov. She was a niece of Counts Zakhar and Ivan Chernyshov and the sister of the lady-in-waiting Princess Darya Petrovna Saltykova. Natalya went with the family to London, her father's new posting as ambassador to the Kingdom of Great Britain, and received an excellent education, eventually being able to speak five languages. The Chernyshyovs were recalled to Russia in 1756, spending four years in the country before her father's appointment in 1760 as ambassador to the court of Louis XV of France.

Upon the Chernyshyovs' return to Russia in 1762, Natalya and her sister Darya became known as two of the most learned women in Russia. In 1762 she was appointed maid of honour to Empress Catherine the Great, and was awarded a unique gold medal with Catherine's portrait by the empress for her dance in the "Court Carousel" of 1766. In October 1766 she married the 35-year-old Prince Vladimir Borisovich Golitsyn, in a wedding attended by the Empress herself, who decorated the Princess's hair with diamonds and accompanied her to the church. The early years of her marriage were spent setting her husband's estates in order. The Golitsyns had very extensive households and landholdings, but they were in some disarray. Natalya Petrovna, by travelling from estate to estate, was able to put the estates in order, while also significantly increasing their income. As one of their contemporaries recorded: "Golitsyn was a rich landowner, but a simple-minded person. His wife easily got the better of him, putting him in the rank of a lowly brigadier, and reorganised the estates. Natalya Petrovna, a clever woman by nature and a great organiser, arranged things, taking management of the estates in her own hands and solely disposing affairs to increase her wealth. She kept all of her household in strict obedience; as the children grew up, they did not dare to sit in her presence."

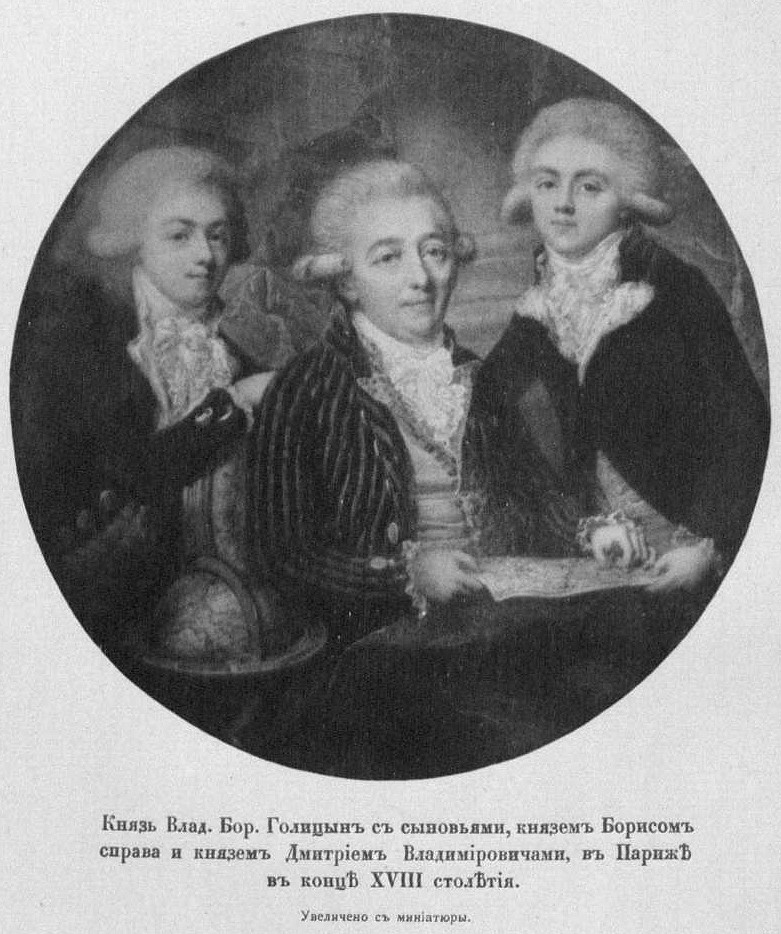
Prince V.B. Golitsyn with his sons Boris and Dmitry in Paris (photo magnification from a miniature of the late 1780s (from the book of 1916)).

In 1782 her sons were sent to Strasbourg in the company of a valet. In June 1783 she left for France with her daughters, settling in Paris (Rue Saint-Florentin) for the children's education. She attended the court of Marie Antoinette, where she became known as the "Moscow Venus", well regarded for her dancing ability. From 1786 her sons attended the École militaire. After attending Estates General of 1789 she, her husband and their daughters visited London, where the Prince of Wales, the future King George IV, presented her with his autographed portrait. On 14 July 1789 Dmitry was somehow involved in the Storming of the Bastille. He wrote his mother about the activities of the National Constituent Assembly (France). On 14 July 1790 they were back in Paris. Empress Catherine ordered all Russians abroad to return home, and the Golitsyns returned to Russia in August 1790, except the brothers who visited Rome, where they were portrayed by Hugh Douglas Hamilton. She left two diaries from this period, which were subsequently published; Notes About the Events of My Life (Russian: заметки о событиях моей жизнь), covering the years 1781 to 1783, and Notes About My Travels (Russian: заметки о моих путешествиях), covering the years 1783 to 1790.

== Salon hostess ==
The Golitsyns settled at their St Petersburg townhouse, Number 10 Malaya Morskaya Street, where Natalya hosted a salon for French monarchist émigrés. Empress Catherine approved of the gatherings, seeing in them, as Filipp Vigel wrote "one of the strongholds of the throne against free-thinking", and even her successor Emperor Paul I allowed them. Natalya became a recognised figure at court, and an important centre of court affairs. Vladimir Sollogub wrote that "Almost all of the nobility were related to her by blood or by marriage. The emperors expressed an almost filial love for her. In the city, it was somehow recognized that she ruled with unconditional power. After their presentation to the court, each young girl was brought to bow to her; the guard officer, who had only just put on epaulets, came to her as the commander-in-chief." Her position in the capital's social life was such that every Emperor and Empress of Russia from Catherine the Great to Nicholas I paid their respects to her. In September 1801 Emperor Alexander I appointed her the Order of St. Catherine Second Class, while in 1806 she was made a lady-in-waiting to the court. In August 1826 she was made a member of the Order of St. Catherine First Class, at the coronation of Nicholas I.

She used her society position to press for the commutation of the death penalty of those convicted during Decembrist revolt of 1825. A contemporary recorded that she intervened on behalf of one of her Chernyshov nephews and Nikita Muravyov, and possibly others as well. Along with successes at court, Natalya Petrovna engaged in the improvement of her estates, and in 1824 became an honorary member of the Scientific and Economic Society. In 1832 she was listed as the owner of three enterprises in Oryol Governorate, a tannery and glass factory in Kokorevka and a linen factory in Radogoshch. Evidence shows that she personally managed her property, and in Radogoshch the estate's office building, a distillery, stud-farm and stone church were built during her time as owner. There is the suggestion that the serfs were worked hard however, as in 1797 they rioted and burned down the tannery's office and the distillery. Princess Golitsyna was known to be haughty with those of equal social standing, and friendly with those whom she considered lower than herself. A contemporary noted that "she ruled in the light, recognized by all".

== Family ==
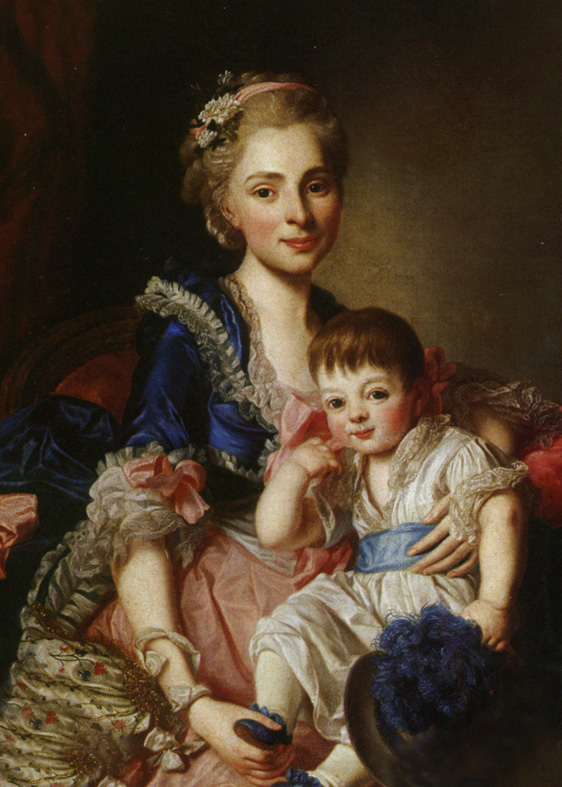
Natalya Petrovna Golitsyn with her first son, Pyotr, in a 1768 portrait

Natalya Petrovna had five children with her husband. Her first son, Pyotr, was born in 1767, but died in 1778. Her second son Boris, born in 1769, became a lieutenant general, before dying in 1813 of wounds he sustained at the Battle of Borodino. Dmitry was born in 1771 and rose to be a statesman and military writer. He married Tatiana Vasilyevna Vasilchikova, with whom he had five children, before his death in 1844. The Golitsyn's two daughters, Ekaterina (1770–1854) and Sofia (1775–1845), married Stepan Stepanovich Apraksin and Pavel Alexandrovich Stroganov respectively, with each having five children. All received excellent educations, and while living in Paris before the revolution it was noted that they spoke French better than they did Russian.

Princess Golitsyna acquired a reputation as the autocrat of her family, being both capricious and domineering. Her children were afraid to sit in her presence; when her son Boris Vladimirovich did something to offend her, she refused to speak to him for over a year. Boris died during the Napoleonic Wars, leaving behind two orphaned illegitimate children he had had with a gypsy woman. In fear of Natalya's reaction to this news, their existence was kept a secret from her, and they were quietly raised with the family of Boris's brother Dmitry. On the death of her husband in 1798, Natalya's sons became heirs to the family fortune, but did not dare to demand their rightful share of the inheritance from their mother. On their marriages Princess Golitsyna's daughters received 2,000 serfs, while her sons received an annuity of 50,000 rubles. When Dmitry was appointed Governor-General of Moscow in 1820, a social position that required him to give receptions and balls, and to be engaged in charity, he soon fell into debt, as the allowance he received from his mother was not enough to support such a life. Eventually Emperor Nicholas I had to ask Princess Golitsyna to increase her son's allowance so that he would not compromise his name and position with debts. The princess added another 50,000 rubles, considering this a generous sum. It was only on his mother's death, seven years before his own, that Prince Dmitry received his full inheritance, amounting to 16,000 serfs.

== Later life ==
Princess Golitsyna continued her salon hosting duties into her old age, and it was considered a signal honour to attend on her. She received all guests while sitting in her chair, making an exception only for the emperor. Near her chair stood one of her close relatives, who presented the guests, since her eyesight was poor. Depending on the rank or nobility of the guest, the princess would either incline her head, or say a few more or less private words.

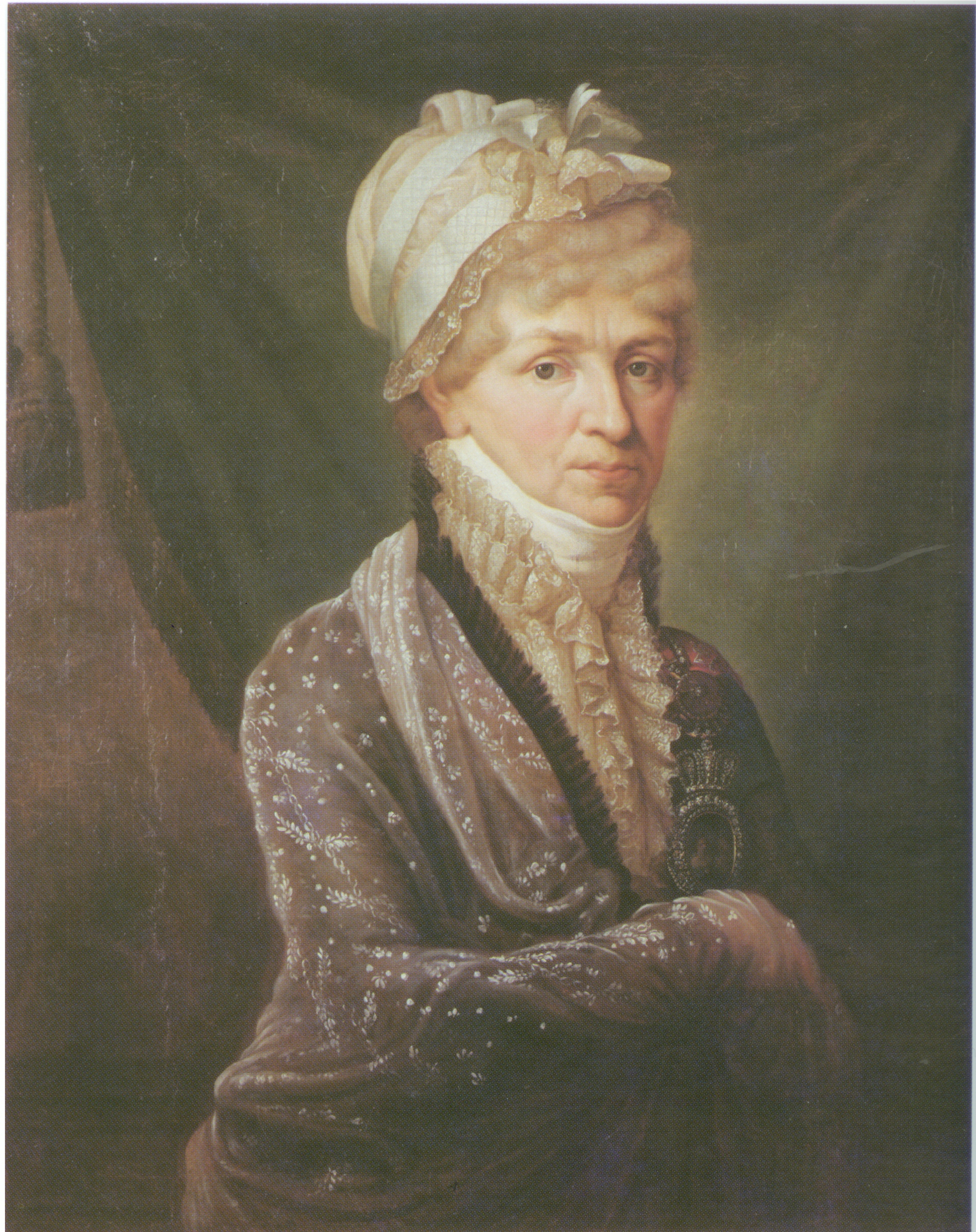
Princess Golitsyna in later life, an 1810s portrait by Benoît-Charles Mitoire

On 18 January 1821 Konstantin Bulgakov wrote to his brother Alexander in Moscow, "yesterday I was at the house of old Golitsyna. In the morning I went to congratulate her and found the whole city there. The Empress Elizabeth Alekseevna also came. In the evening, the whole city was there again, although no one had been summoned. She turned 79 years old yesterday, and I admired her appetite and vigour ... There is no happier mother than old Golitsyna, you have to see how her children take care of her, and her children already have grandchildren." In her youth the princess was a famous beauty. In old age her facial hair became more prominent, leading to the nickname bestowed upon her by the "sharp tongues of the high-society wits" "Princess Moustache", rendered in either French as "Princesse Moustache", or Russian as "Княгиня Усатая" (Knyaginya Usataya) or "Княгиня Мусташ" (Knyagina Mustash), or by the androgynous "Princesse Woldemar".

=== Pushkin and the Queen of Spades ===
Princess Golitsyna was an inspiration for the character of the countess in Alexander Pushkin's The Queen of Spades, written in 1833. On its publication in 1834 Pushkin wrote about its reception, noting that "At the court, they found similarities between the old Countess and Princess Natalya Petrovna and do not seem to be angry." A story spread that Princess Golitsyna's grand-nephew, Prince Sergei Grigorevich Golitsyn had gone to her for help after losing a large sum of money at cards. Princess Golitsyna replied that she knew the secret of the three magic cards, the three, the seven and the ace, having been told it by her friend in France, the Count of St. Germain. Sergei Golitsyn then used this knowledge to win the money back. Sergei Golitsyn had then related this story to Pushkin. Princess Golitsyna, who by the time of the publication of her story was in her 90s, began to be identified with the character, being nicknamed the "Queen of Spades", while her house in St Petersburg became known as the "House of the Queen of Spades" (Russian: Дом Пиковой дамы). In later years the house and the intersection it stood on came to be considered a haunted site.

The popular story stemmed from a friend of Pushkin's, P. V. Nashchokin, who related to historian P. I. Bartenev that it had been a Golitsyn who had told the cards anecdote to Pushkin. The Golitsyn in question was identified as likely being Sergei by Mstislav Tsiavlovskii, a connection challenged by A. A. Ilin-Tomich who presented evidence that he was not the source of the anecdote. The 1999 Oxford World's Classics edition notes that the characteristics of the countess likely owed more to Natalia Zagryazhskaya, who like Golitsyna had been a lady-in-waiting at court in the eighteenth century, and whose salons Pushkin had attended. When queried about the likeness with Zagryazhskaya, the great-aunt of Pushkin's wife Natalia, by Pavel Nashchokin, Pushkin admitted "It was easier for me to portray Zagryazhskaya, than for Golitsyna, whose character and habits were more complicated." The Oxford edition also notes that, despite the story of Sergei Golitsyn and Pushkin, neither Zagryazhskaya or Golitsyna were the inspiration for the occult aspect of the story involving the Count of St. Germain.

Princess Golitsyna died in St Petersburg on 1 January 1838, at age 96. In her long life she had been maid of honour during the reigns of five emperors and empresses, and a lady-in-waiting at the courts of Alexander I and Nicholas I. She was buried in the Golitsyn family tomb in the Donskoy Monastery in Moscow.
