= Dmitry Golitsyn =

Russian cavalry general (1771–1844)

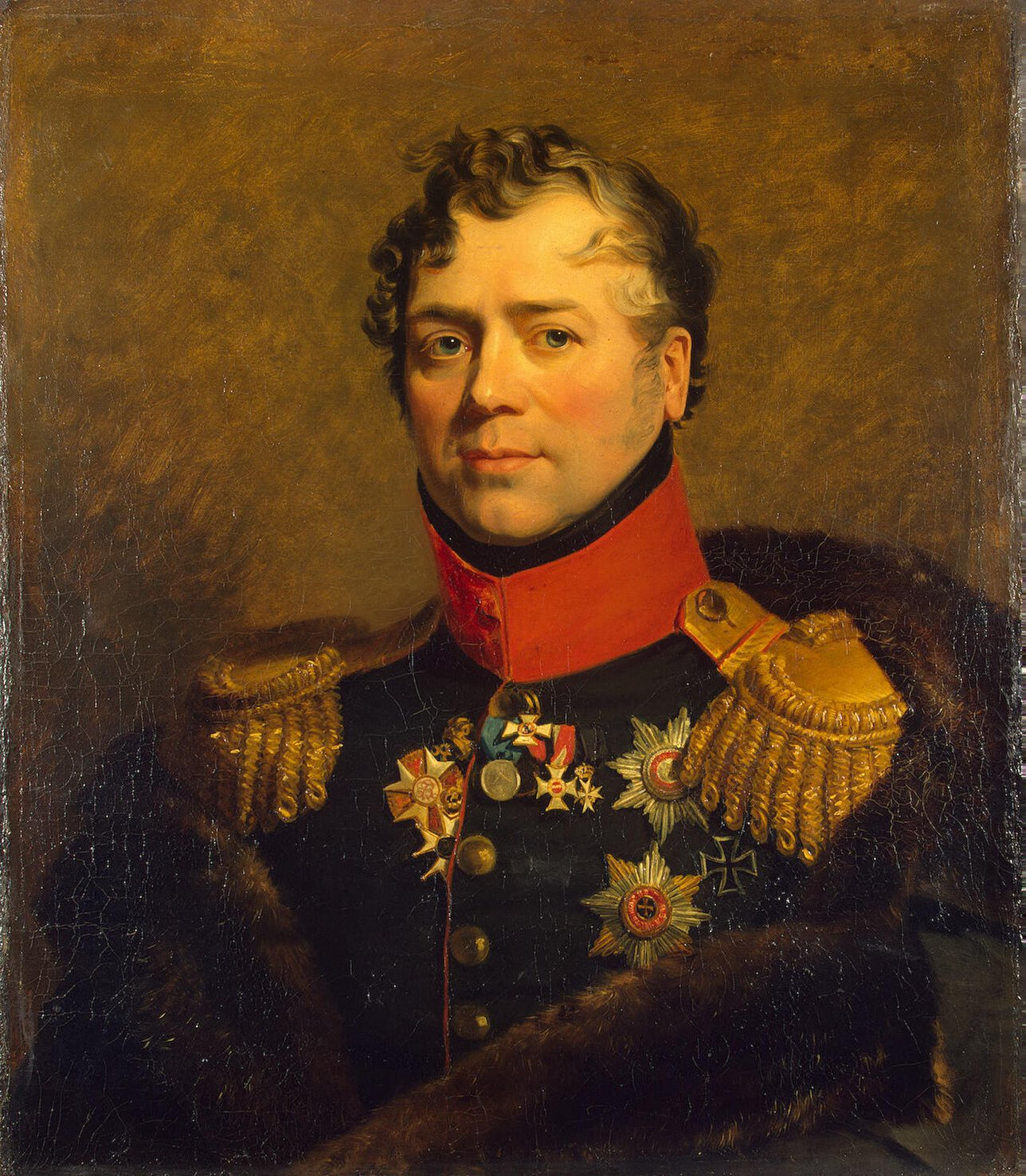
Portrait by George Dawe, c. 1825

Prince Dmitry Vladimirovich Golitsyn (Russian: Дмитрий Владимирович Голицын; 10 November [O.S. 30 October] 1771 – 8 April [O.S. 27 March] 1844) was a Russian cavalry general prominent during the Napoleonic Wars, statesman and military writer. Golitsyn held one of the main roles in the Battle of Krasnoi (the central column).

== Biography ==
He was born in the Golitsyn family of Knyaz Vladimir Borisovich Golitsyn (1731–1798) and his wife Natalie Chernyshova, nicknamed La Princesse Moustache, or the Queen of Spades, who was portrayed as a central character in Pushkin's story (and Tchaikovsky's opera) of the same name. She was known as a learned woman, a gambler, a good dancer and served Catherine the Great. His siblings were Boris Vladimirovitch Golitsyn, Ekaterina Vladimirovna Apraksina and Sophie Stroganov.

In 1774 Golitsyn was enrolled in the Leib Guard Preobrazhensky regiment and received his first rank of sergeant in 1777. He continued his education in Strasbourg in 1782. He travelled in Germany and France with the family. In 1786 the Golitsyns settled in Paris, where Dmitry and his brother Boris studied military science at the École Militaire. On 14 July 1789 Dmitry was somehow involved in the Storming of the Bastille. He wrote his mother about the activities of the National Assembly (France). In 1791 the Golitsyns returned to Imperial Russia and he entered the cavalry. During the Kościuszko Uprising he fought under Aleksandr Suvorov and on 24 October 1794 distinguished himself at the Battle of Praga and earned his first Order of St. George of the 4th degree.

During the reign of Emperor Paul I he was quickly promoted, first to colonel (on 2 May 1797), then to Major General (on 5 August 1798), and finally to Lieutenant General (on 21 August 1800). He meanwhile received the Order of St. Anne 4th class, and also became a member of the Knights Hospitaller. He also married Tatiana Vasilyevna Vasilchikova in 1800.

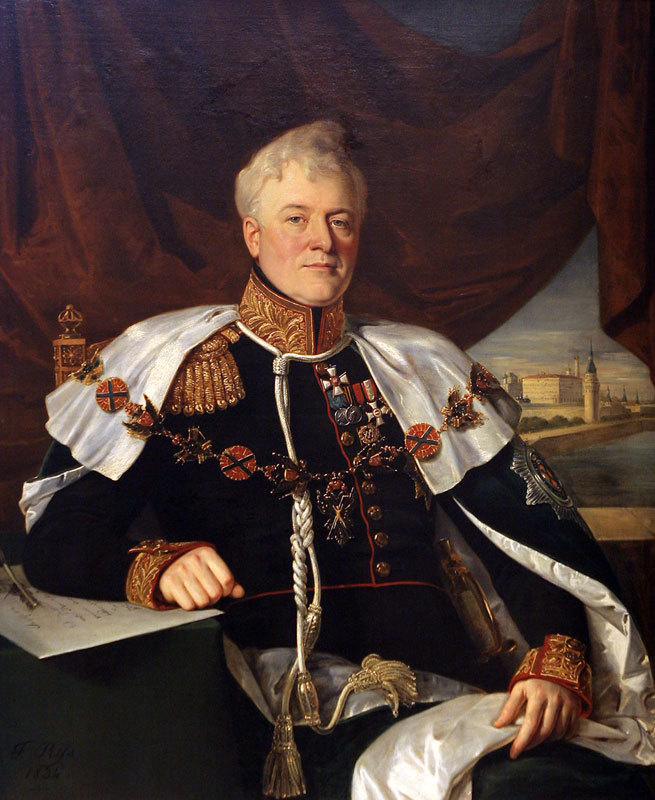
Portrait by François Nicholas Riss

Golitsyn fought bravely during the Napoleonic Wars. In 1805, during the War of the Third Coalition, his regiment started the campaign in the corps of Count Bennigsen in Silesia. In December 1806 he led the 4th division at the Battle of Golymin. This engagement and Bennigsen's Battle of Pułtusk stopped the French forces. After that, Golitsyn commanded the cavalry of the left wing. His forces took part in all major actions – at Eylau, Heilsberg and Friedland. For this campaign he received numerous Russian and foreign awards: the Order of St. George 3rd class (on 21 January 1807), the Order of St. Vladimir 2nd class, the Prussian Order of the Red Eagle (on 18 May 1807), the Order of the Black Eagle (on 25 June 1807), and a gold sword with diamonds with the inscription For Bravery.

After a brief participation in the Finnish War—proposing entering Sweden over the frozen Bothnian Gulf—Golitsyn resigned his commission on 18 April 1809 and travelled to Germany. He listened to lectures at different universities. Upon returning to Russia, he lived on his Viaziomy Manor near Moscow. Dmitry spoke French most of the time; his knowledge of the Russian language was limited.

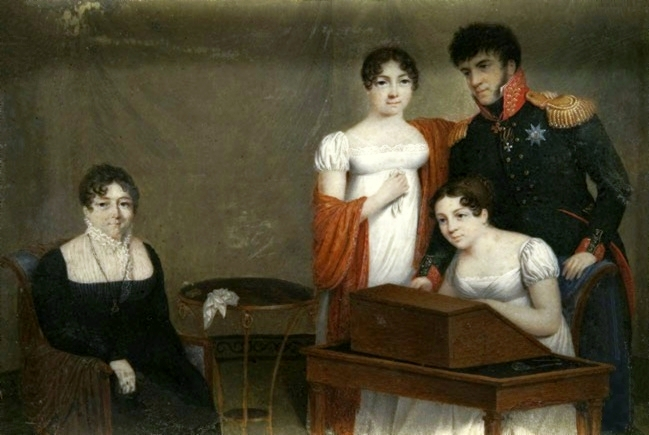
Golitsyn family by Vladimir Borovikovsky (1810), National Museum in Warsaw

On 31 August 1812 (New Style) he entered military service again. During the Fire of Moscow he offered 30,000 roubles to conduct him to the Russian army. Kutuzov entrusted him with leading the cavalry of the 2nd Western Army and the 1st and 2nd Cuirassier Divisions that were not assigned to any cavalry corps, at which he excelled at Tarutino, Vyazma, and Krasny. On 17 November, on Kutuzov's orders, he attacked the French near Krasny and inflicted heavy damage on them. In 1814 he was promoted to the rank of full General of the Cavalry.

He governed Moscow as military Governor from 1820 and put much effort in rebuilding the city after the Fire of Moscow (1812). In 1829 he founded a committee aimed at the protection of prisoners and supported Friedrich Joseph Haass.

In the late 1830s Golitsyn fell seriously ill and from 1838 he received medical treatment for the urolithiasis. On 16 April 1841 Golitsyn received the title of Serene Prince for his great merits. He died in Paris on 27 March 1844, a few months before the 25th anniversary of his service as Governor of Moscow.

== Works ==
Dmitriy Golitsyn wrote several military books, including:

- Essai sur le 4-eme livre de Vegece (1790)
- Manuel du volontaire en campagne (1794)
- Опыт наставлений, касающийся до экзерсиций и манёвров кавалерийского полка (1804)

He also sponsored the Bulletin du Nord described Russia for foreign readers.

| Preceded by Alexander Tormasov | War Governor of Moscow Governorate; 1820 – 1843 | Succeeded by Alexei Scherbatov |

== Sources ==
- Velichko, Konstantin; Novitsky, Vasily; Schwarz, Alexey von; Apushkin, Vladimir; Schulz, Gustav von (1912). "Дмитрій Владиміровичъ Голицын" [Dmitry Vladimirovich Golitsyn]. Sytin Military Encyclopedia (in Russian). Vol. 8: Гимры – Двигатели судовые. Moscow: Типография Т-ва И. Д. Сытина. pp. 363–364.
- Dictionary of Russian Generals
- Families of the nobility of the Russian Empire. Vol. II "Princes". Saint Petersburg, 1995. P. 42.
- "Голицыны, русские полководцы и государственные деятели" . Brockhaus and Efron Encyclopedic Dictionary (in Russian). 1906.
