= Boris Vladimirovich Golitsyn =

Russian aristocrat

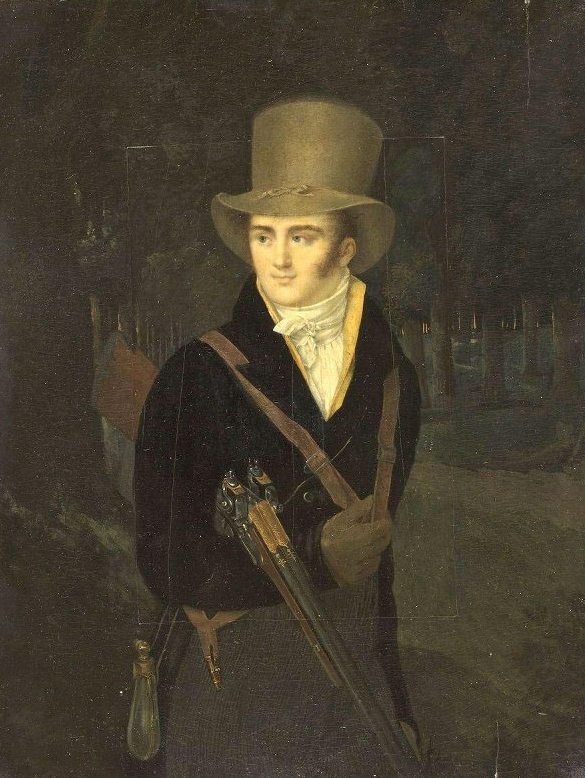
Boris Vladimirovich Golitsyn with top hat

Prince Boris Vladimirovich Golitsyn (Russian: Князь Бори́с Влади́мирович Голи́цын; 6 January 1769, Moscow - 6 January 1813, Vilnius) was a Russian aristocrat from the Moscow branch of the House of Golitsyn, who fought in the Napoleonic Wars and rose to the rank of lieutenant general.

== Life ==
Boris was the son of Vladimir Borisovich Golitsyn and his wife Natalya Petrovna. She was known as a learned woman, a gambler, and a good dancer and served Catherine the Great. Natalya was the inspiration for the lead character in Pushkin's The Queen of Spades. His younger siblings were Sophie Vladimirovna Stroganova, countess Ekaterina Vladimirovna Apraksina and prince Dmitry Golitsyn.

He joined up as a sergeant in the Semyonovsky Regiment of Russia's Imperial Guard in 1781 aged 12. Between 1782 and 1786 he studied at the Protestant faculty in Strasbourg to perfect his French and German language skills. He admired Goethe and Friedrich Schiller and wrote the latter a letter in German when he was only 17. He also keenly studied music and dance, gaining him the nickname "Boris-Vestris" after the French dancer Auguste Vestris. He continued his education as a sub-lieutenant at the École militaire in Paris during the last years of the Ancien Regime; he did not meet Napoleon Bonaparte who left the school in October 1785. Two weeks after the Storming of the Bastille a written order came to the Golitsyns to patrol in the city as guards. The correspondence of the elder of the Golitsyn brothers attests to his deep interest in analyzing and comprehending the events of the French Revolution. Boris made critical remarks on the proposals of Dubois-Crancé in the Assembly. In 1791 Catherine the Great had ordered the whole family to leave Paris and get back to Moscow, but they first visited Rome, where the brothers were portrayed by Hugh Douglas Hamilton.

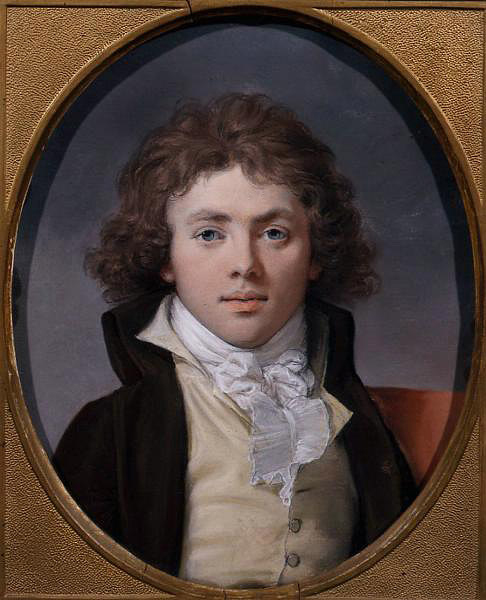
Boris

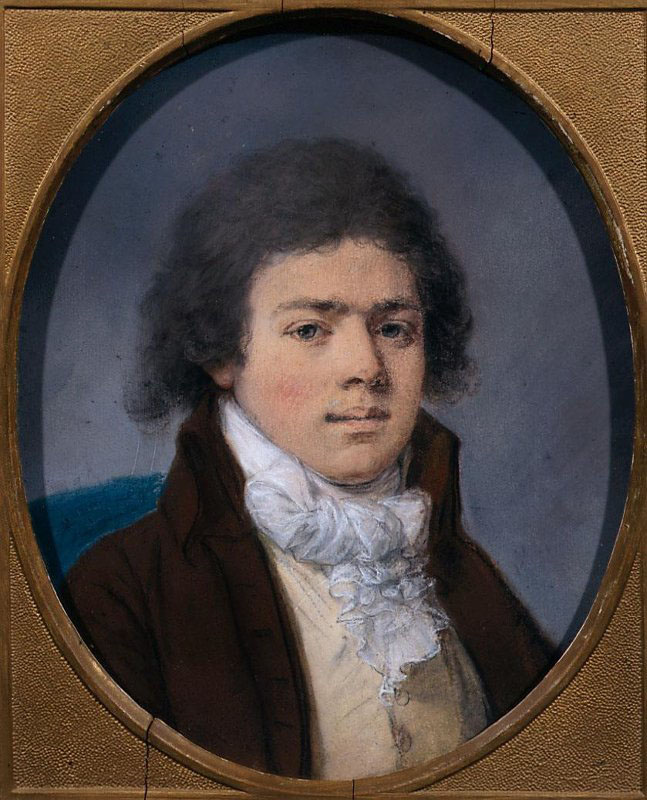
Dmitry

Boris became very hostile to the turn of events and joined the Swedish army to fight against Revolutionary France. In 1794 he fought in Poland (then on the eve of its Third Partition), receiving the Order of St George fourth class on 1 January 1795 for brave deeds in the attack on the fortress at Warsaw during the Battle of Praga on 24 October 1794 (Old Style) - during that battle, he had fought alongside his brother Dmitry.

He was made a colonel in 1796 then major general in 1798 commanding the St Petersburg Grenadier Regiment. On 31 December 1799, he rose to his final rank of lieutenant general before resigning on 24 March the following year. He rejoined the army in 1801 and was put in command of the Pavlovsky Grenadier Regiment in the Guards on 20 May 1802. He was made inspector of Smolensk's infantry regiments on 11 October 1803 and fought in the battles of 1805. He was badly wounded at the battle of Austerlitz and resigned on health grounds on 7 September 1806.

As well as being a skilled musician and dancer, he also tried writing in his youth, publishing 'Aurora' and 'Diogenes and Glyceria' in The Literary Almanac in 1788 when only twenty years old. He also made the first Russian translations of works by Oliver Goldsmith and François de La Rochefoucauld. He was a friend of Gavrila Derzhavin and with him founded a literary society in 1811 called La Causerie des amateurs des mots russes to study archaisms in Russian. That society was strongly criticized by backers of Nikolay Karamzin.

He rejoined the army yet again during the French invasion of Russia in 1812, fighting at the battle of Smolensk and being wounded at the Battle of Borodino. He refused to be evacuated and died at Vilnius on 6 January 1813. His body was later moved to his family state at Viaziomy Castle near Moscow. In 1936 it was reburied in the family chapel of Moscow's Donskoy Monastery.
