= Jean-Laurent Mosnier =

French painter (1743–1808)

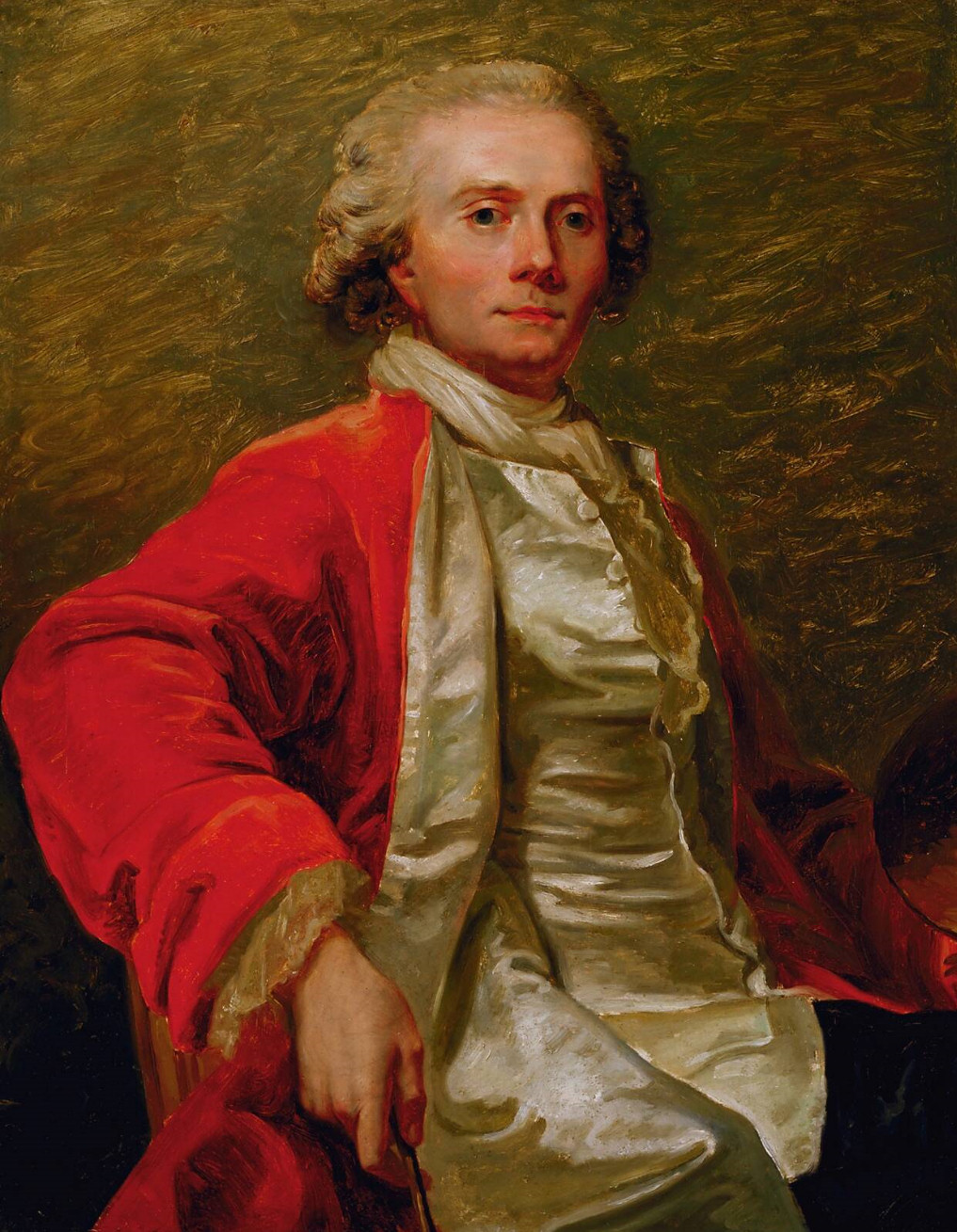
- Self-Portrait, 1786, preparatory work for the larger Self-Portrait with His Daughters of the same year; Minneapolis Institute of Art
- Born: 1743; Paris, Kingdom of France
- Died: 10 April 1808 (aged 64–65); Saint Petersburg, Russian Empire
- Known for: Portrait painting
- Elected: Royal Academician in Paris (1788); Imperial Academician in St. Petersburg (1802)

Jean-Laurent Mosnier (French: [moɲe]; 1743 – 10 April 1808) was a French painter, active in Paris during the Ancien Régime's last decades and then in St. Petersburg during Tsar Alexander I's reign, best known for his portraits.

Court painter under the Ancien Régime, Mosnier began, from 1789, a brilliant career as society painter in London, Hamburg and St. Petersburg. Many times academician, he left considerable work and high quality, both in easel and miniature painting.

Self-Portrait with Two Pupils, by Adélaïde Labille-Guiard, is thought to have been the basis for Mosnier's similar self-portrait with his young daughters. It is thought that his ambition was to clone the success of Labille-Guiard's painting.

== Selected works ==
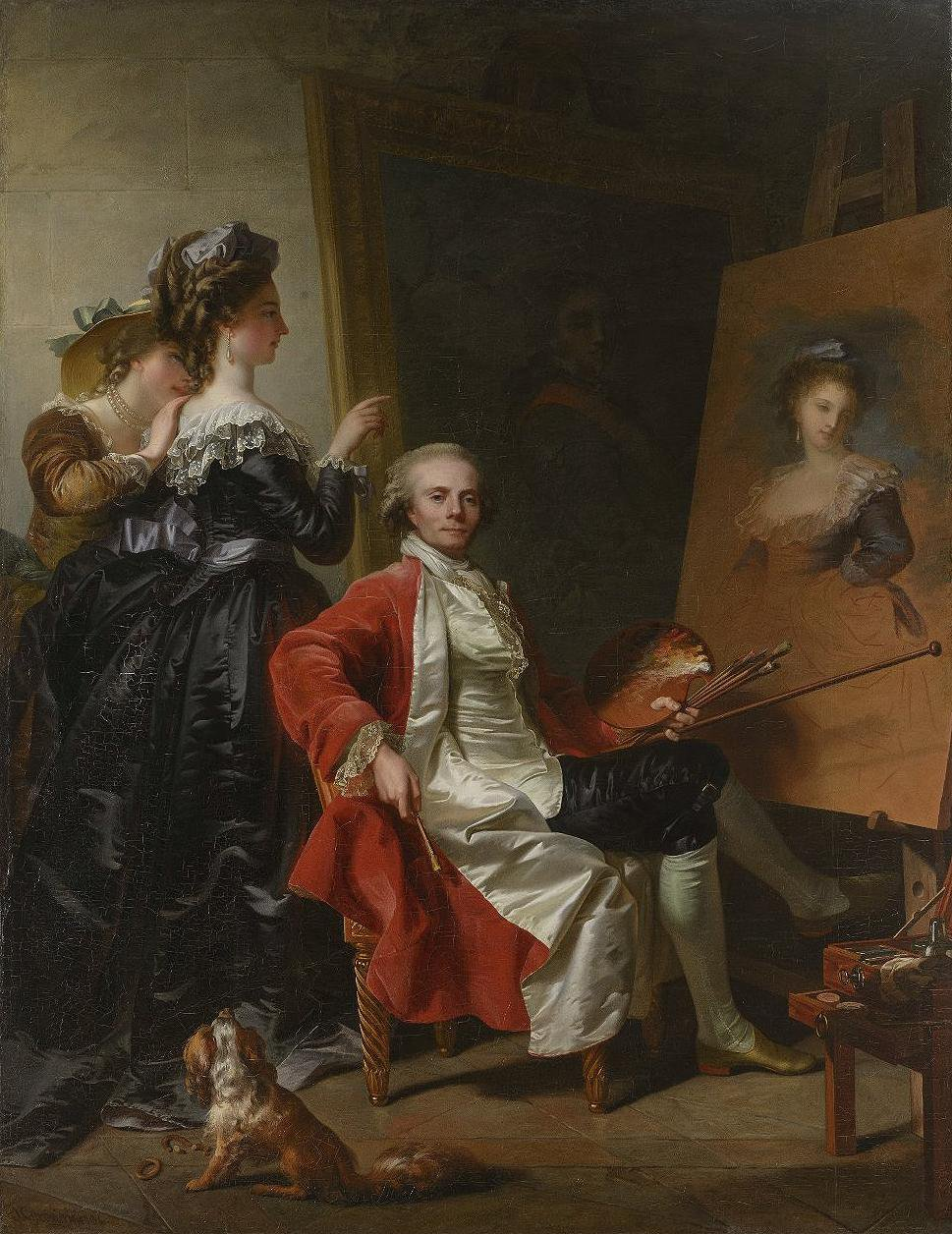
Self-Portrait with His Daughters, 1786; Hermitage Museum

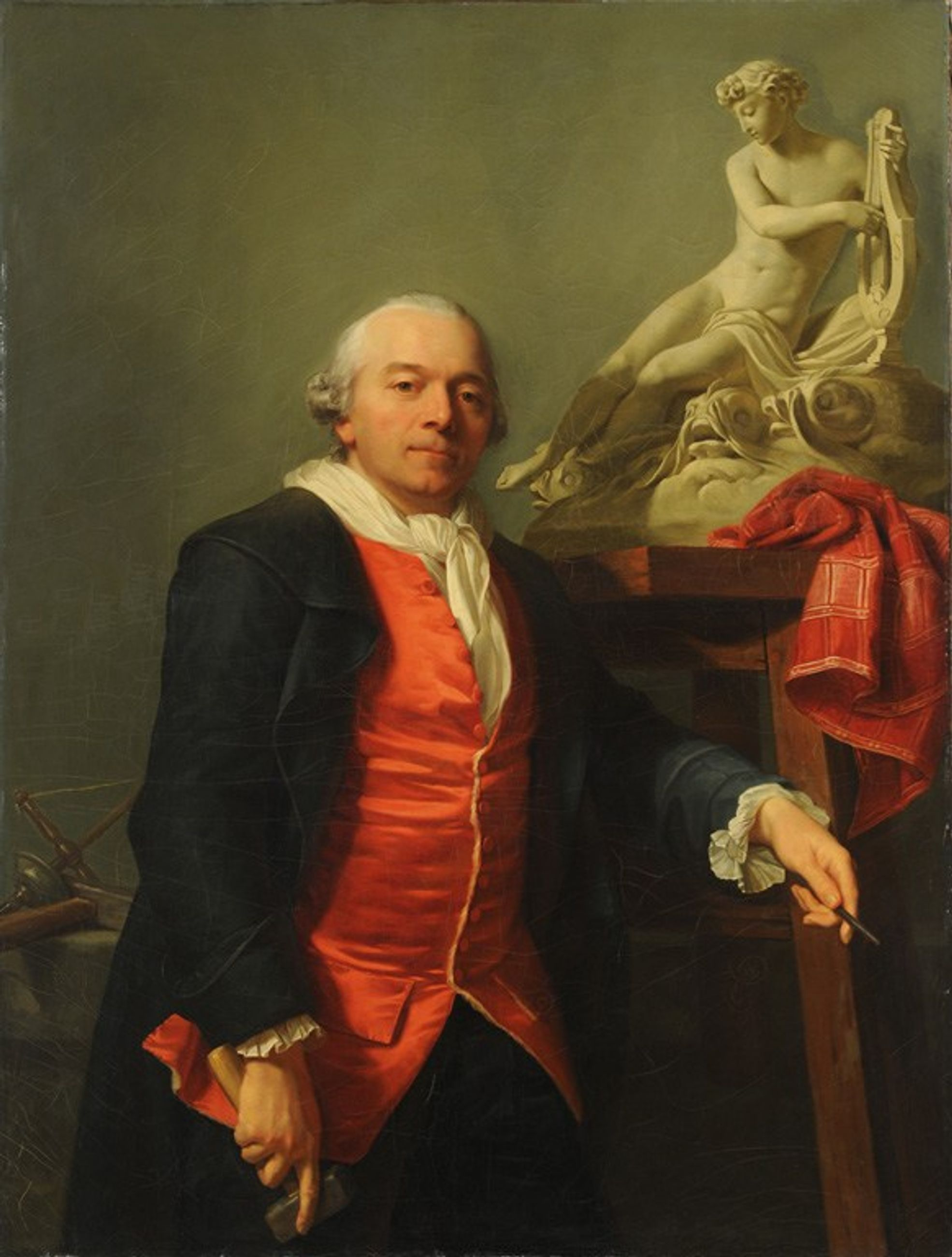
Charles-Antoine Bridan, 1788, reception piece for the Académie Royale; Beaux-Arts de Paris

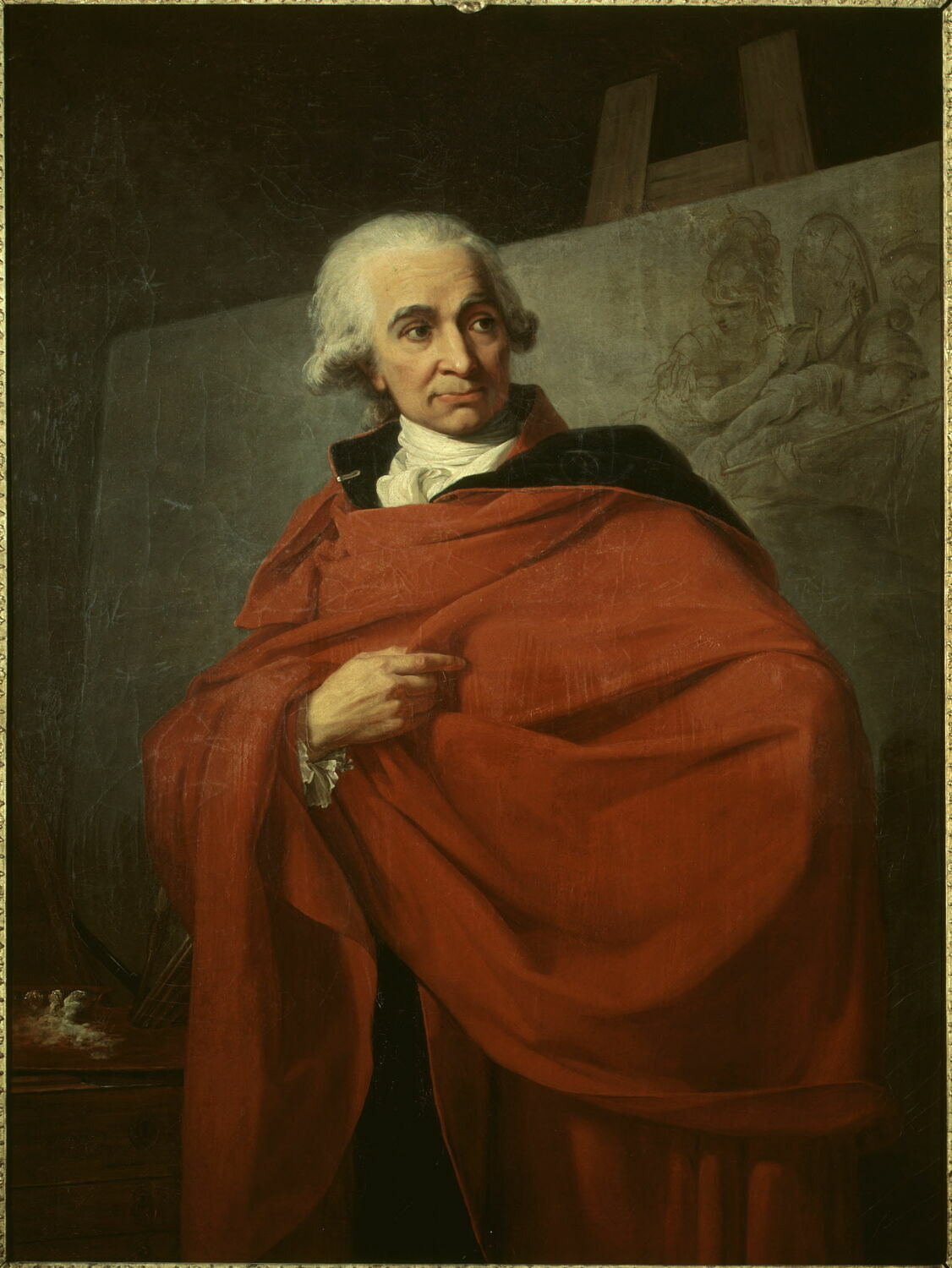
Louis-Jean-François Lagrenée, 1788, reception piece for the Académie Royale; Louvre, on display in the Musée de l'Histoire de France, Versailles

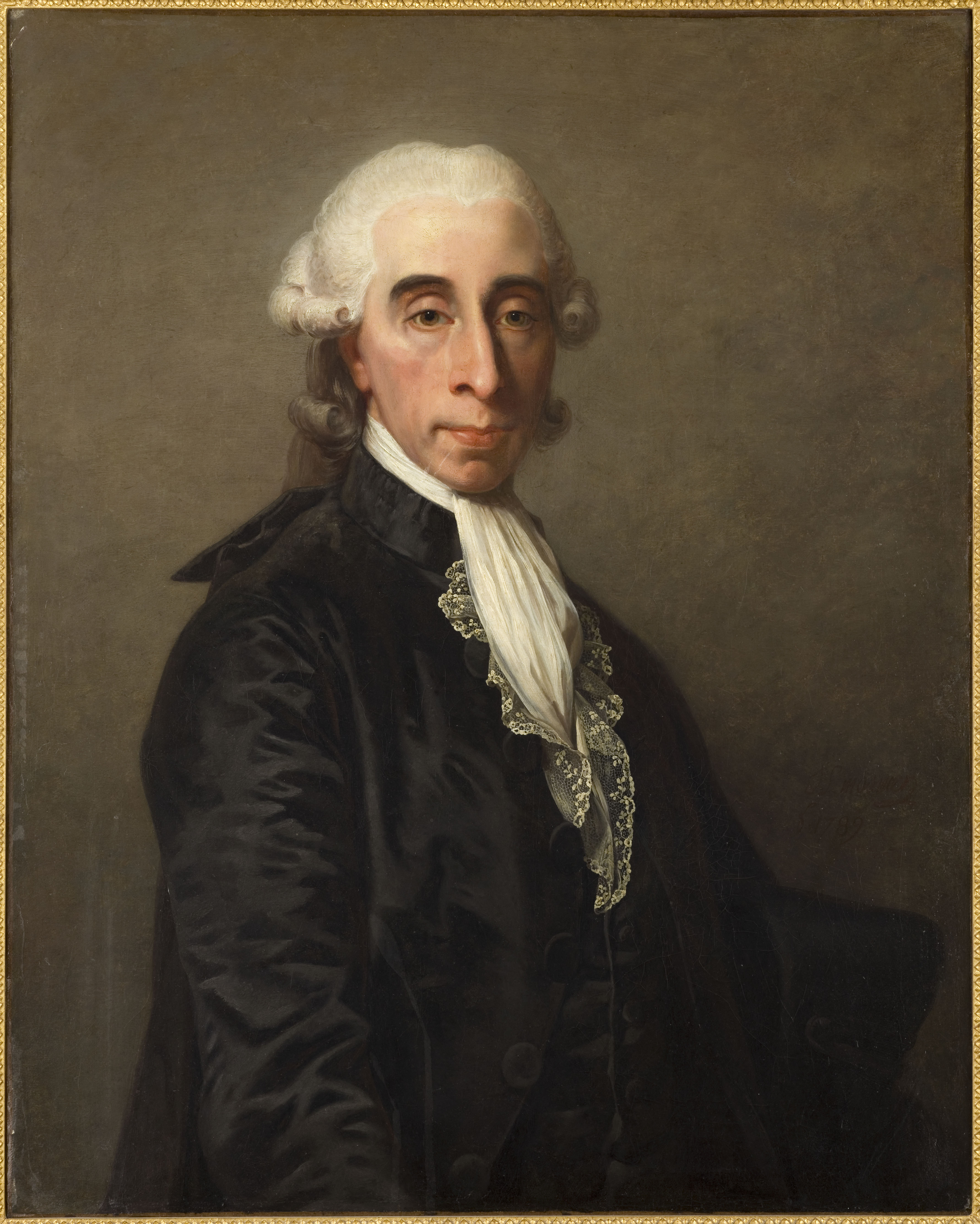
Jean Sylvain Bailly, 1789; Musée Carnavalet

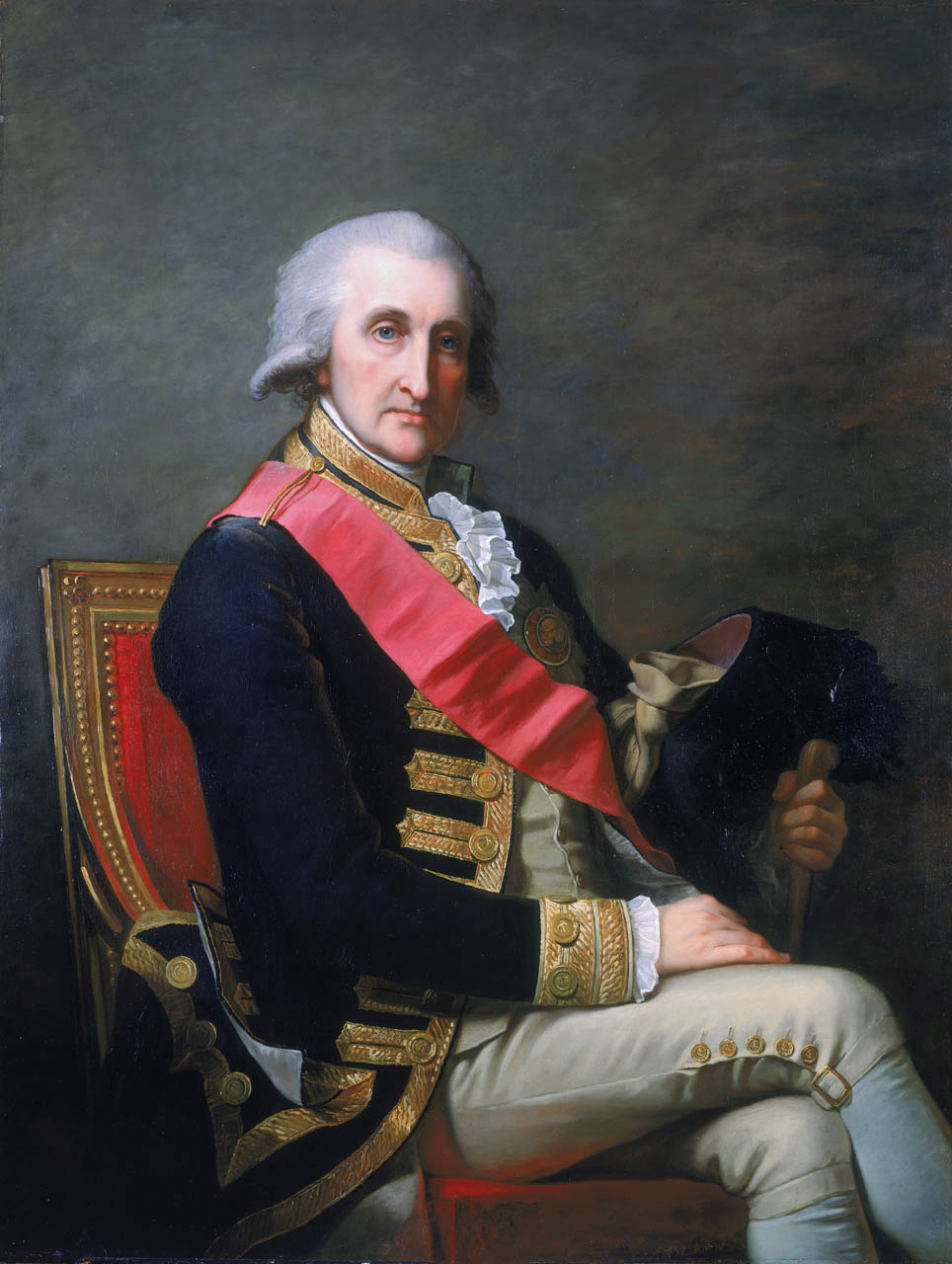
George Rodney, 1st Baron Rodney, 1791; Maritime Museum, Greenwich

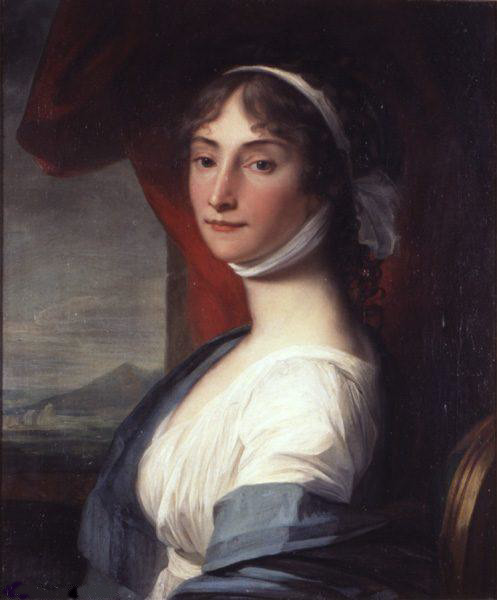
Frederica Leishing, 1799; Hamburger Kunsthalle

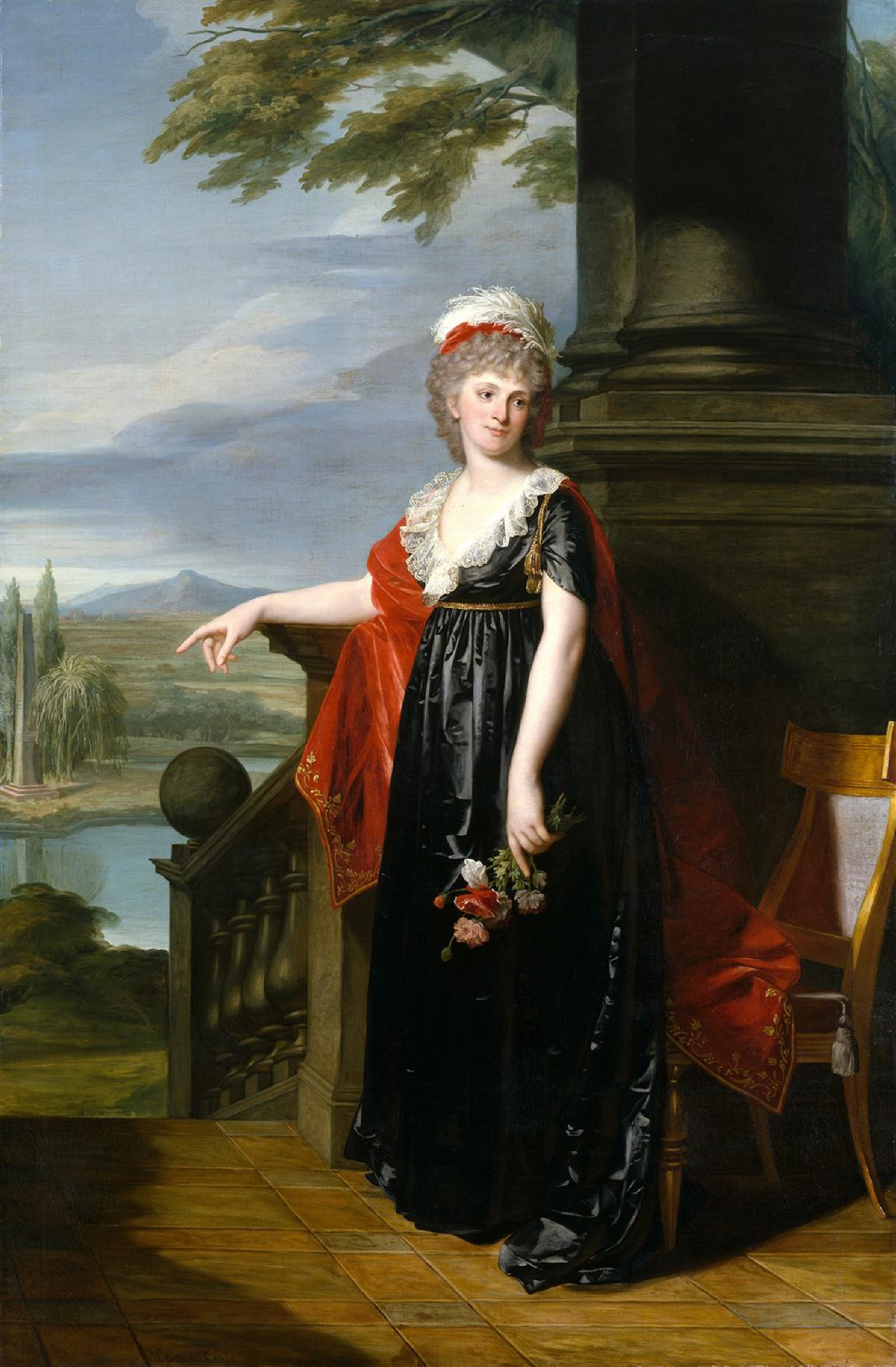
Engel Christine Westphalen, 1800; Kunsthalle Kiel

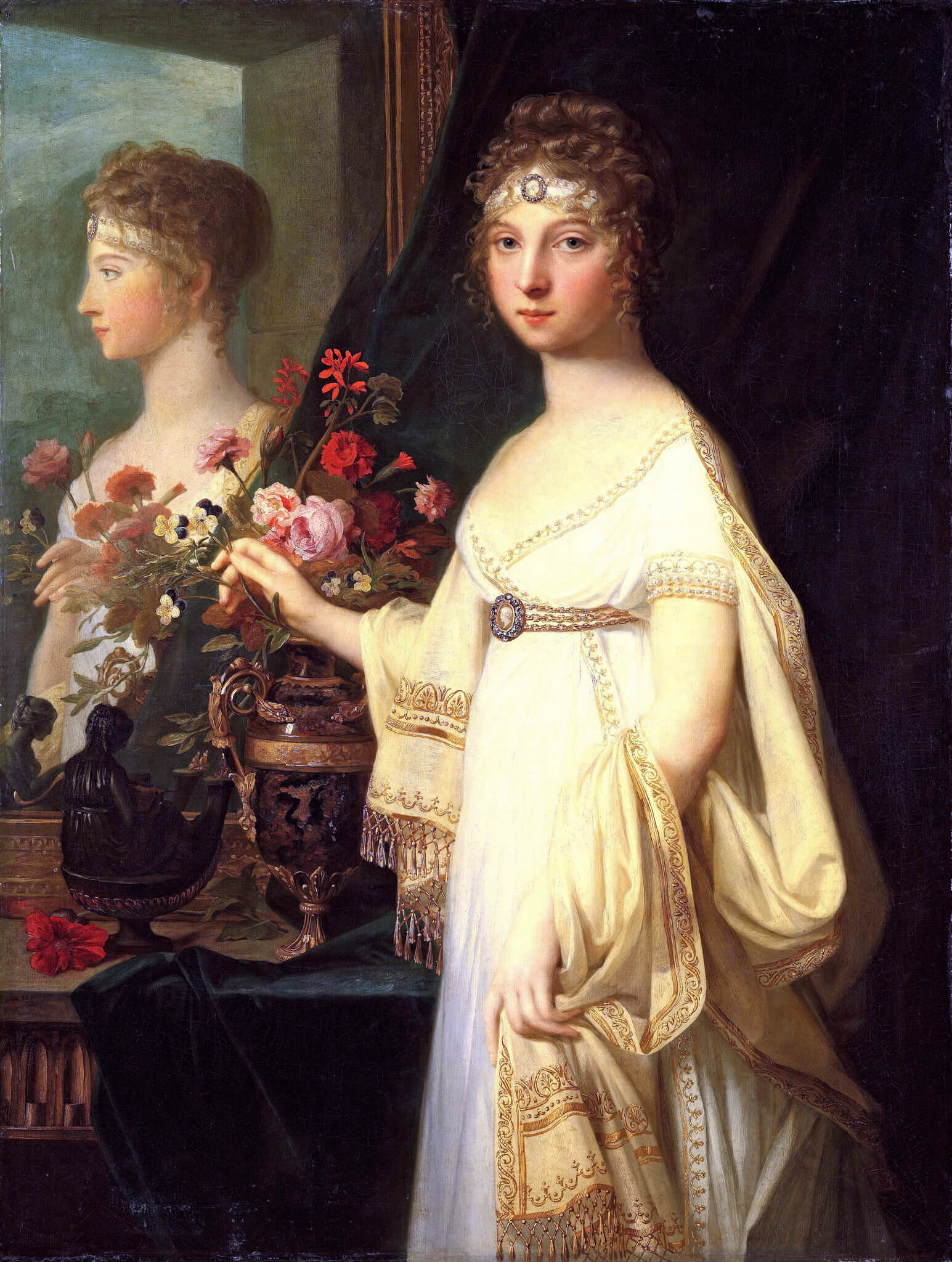
Empress Elizabeth Alexeievna of Russia, 1802; Tretyakov Gallery

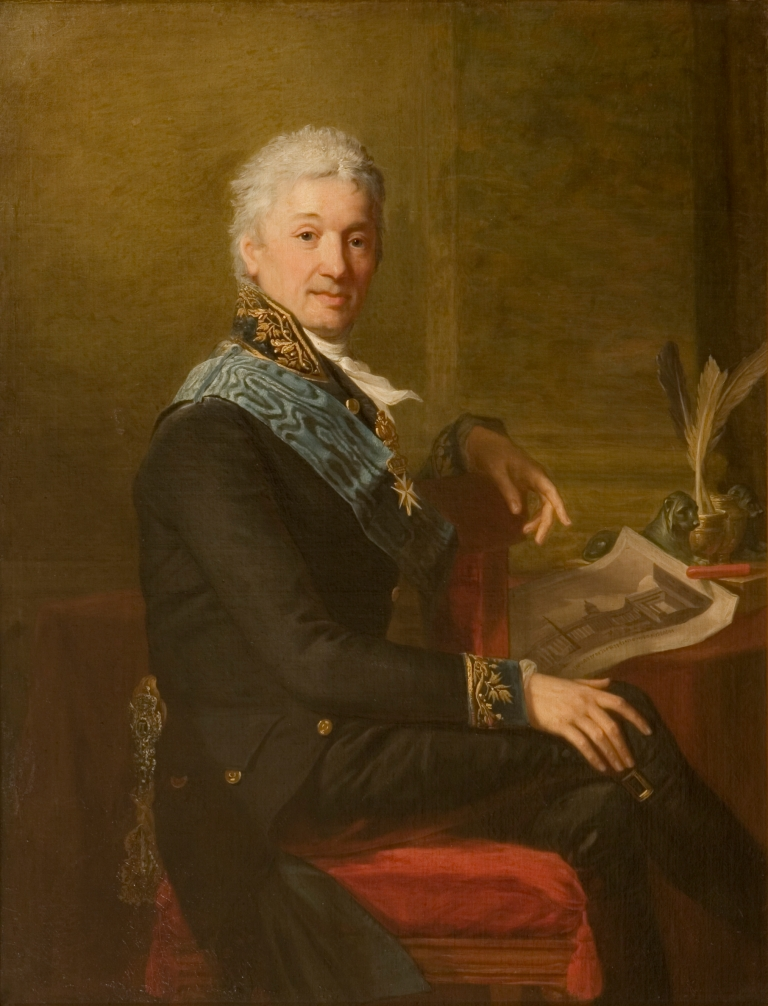
Count Alexander Sergeyevich Stroganov, 1804; Museum of the Russian Academy of Arts

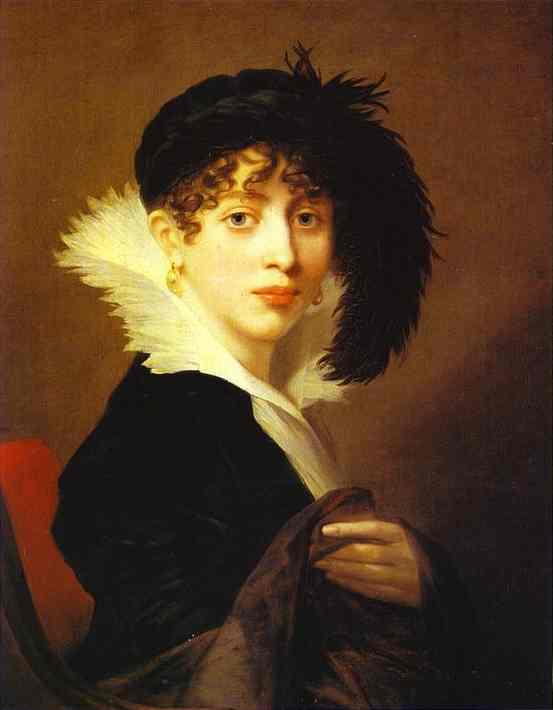
Countess Sophia Vladimirovna Stroganova, 1808; Russian Museum, on display in the Stroganov Palace

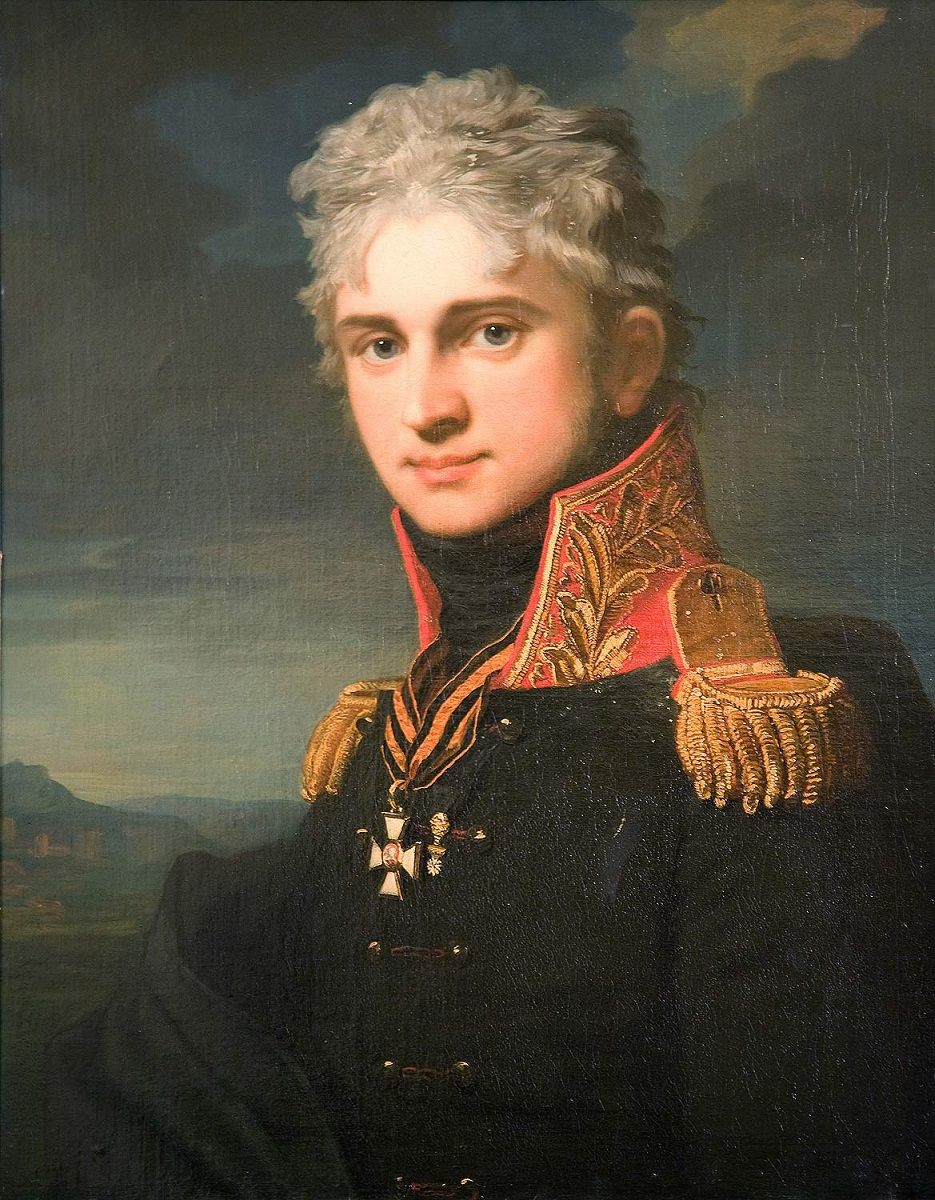
Count Pavel Alexandrovich Stroganov, 1808; Russian Museum, pendant piece to the prior work

== Book sources ==
- Jean-François Heim, Claire Beraud, Philippe Heim, Lounge painting of the French Revolution (1789-1799), Paris, CAC Publishing, 1989.
- Olivier Blanc, Portraits of Women: artists and models at the time of Marie Antoinette, Paris, Carpentier, 2006. (ISBN 9782841674381)
- С. Н. Кондаков (1915). Юбилейный справочник Императорской Академии художеств. 1764-1914 (in Russian). Vol. 2. p. 132.

== Links ==
Media related to Jean-Laurent Mosnier at Wikimedia Commons
