= Bolshiye Vyazyomy =

Bolshiye Vyazyomy Большие Вязёмы
- Urban-type settlement
- Viaziomy Manor

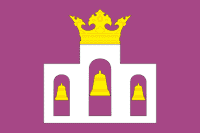
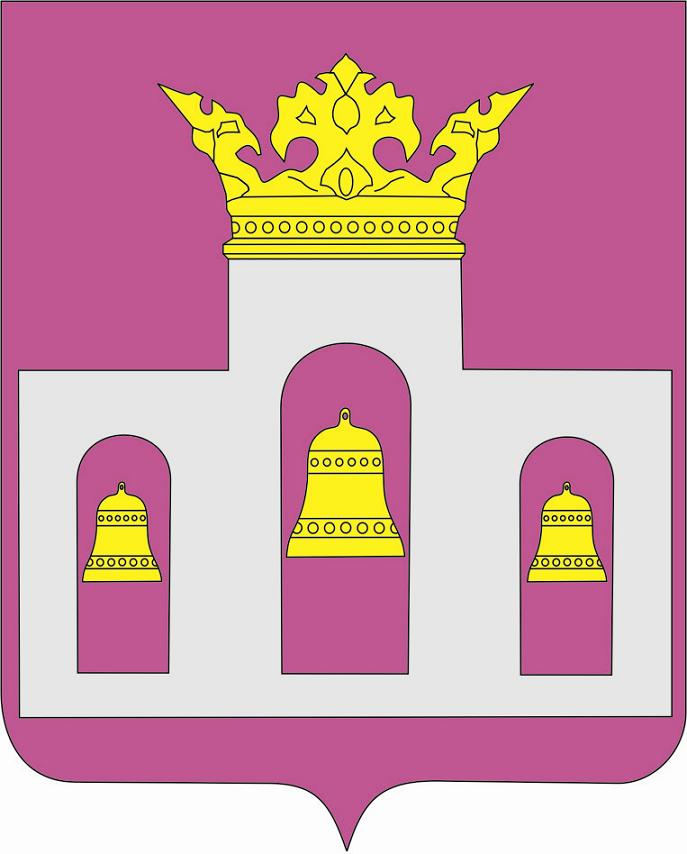
- Flag Coat of arms
- Interactive map of Bolshiye Vyazyomy
- Location of Bolshiye Vyazyomy Bolshiye Vyazyomy (Europe)
- Coordinates: 55.6312°N 37.0148°E
- Country: Russia
- Federal subject: Moscow Oblast
- Administrative district: Odintsovsky District

Population (2010 Census)
  - Total: 12,650
  - Estimate (2025): 15,168 (+19.9%)
- Time zone: UTC+3 (MSK)
- Postal code: 143050
- OKTMO ID: 46641152051

Bolshiye Vyazyomy (Russian: Большие Вязёмы) is an urban locality (an urban-type settlement) in Odintsovsky District of Moscow Oblast, Russia. The population is 12,650 (2010 census); 5,667 (2002 census); Vyazyomy is the location of Vyazyomy Manor owned by members of the Golitsyn family. Both Kutuzov and Napoleon Bonaparte slept in the main manor house (on the same sofa in the library) only one day apart; Kutuzov left the day before the French entered Moscow. The manor and two outbuildings remain to this day.

== Vyazyomy estate and manor ==
The present settlement dates back to the village of the same name, which was first mentioned in 1526 as a relay station. It was the penultimate horse-changing station on the postal and travel route, 54 km from Moscow. (The next one was in Dorogomilovo; and it is often mentioned in the business letters of that time, related to the arrival of foreign ambassadors.) In the 16th century Bolshiye Vyazyomy was the family estate of Boris Godunov, and later the country palace of False Dmitry I, who turned the estate into a place of entertainment and organized 'jolly battles'. A unique monument of 16th-century architecture is a cathedral (1584–1598), rededicated to the Transfiguration of Jesus in 1702. After the accession of Michael of Russia the village was assigned to the palace department of the Romanovs. In 1694 the estate was presented by Peter I of Russia to his tutor boyar Boris Alexeyevich Golitsyn as a fief for having saved him during the Moscow uprising of 1682. Since then, Vyazyomy remained the ancestral estate of the Golitsyns, although Boris rarely came to Vyaziomy preferring to live at the Dubrovitsy estate (near Podolsk), which came from his wife's family.

Since 1766, Vyazyomy with around 900 serfs passed to Nikolai Mikhailovich Golitsyn (1729–1799). He settled on the estate, where he engaged in farming and large-scale construction. It was under Nikolai Mikhailovich that the preserved stone manor house and outbuildings of the estate were built in the Louis XVI style. Construction was carried out for eighteen years from 1766 to 1784. On the first floor was a library, and on the second floor an art gallery. Simultaneously with the manor a small regular park was created.

The events of the War of 1812 could not pass over Vyazyomy: the village happened to be in the immediate zone of troop movements. By the end of the third day after the Borodino battle, on 10 September, the main quarter of the Russian army was situated in Bolshiye Vyaziomy. Here Mikhail Kutuzov wrote a number of orders and letters to Fyodor Rostopchin and organized the withdrawal from Moscow.

On 12 September [O.S. 31 August] 1812 the main forces of Kutuzov departed from the village in three columns, and Malye Vyaziomy was occupied by the French Dragoons of the Imperial Guard.

IHQ has passed the previous night at a superb manor-house owned by the immensely rich Prince Galitzin. Lying beside a lake, it was ‘the first really fine château we’d seen in Russia. The soldiers of the advance guard,’ Castellane had been sorry to see, had ‘damaged it somewhat, as was their custom, by slashing the upholstery’ of its ‘very elegant furniture’. It’s also remarkable for ‘some very charming sculptures, some of them really good’, which Captain Bonnet – at the same time finding its position ‘a bit dreary, surrounded by woods pierced on one side by avenues, with a little stream and with lakes, frozen for eight months in the year, and formed with the help of dikes’ – will relish, bivouacking there with Razout’s division (III).

As they were 'daily bothered by numerous pulks of Cossacks' Napoleon ordered to clean the area and forage with the assistance of de:Johan Frederik Wilhelm Veeren and a Dutch flying squadron, two battalions of the 33rd Regiment Light infantry.

On 28 September [O.S. 16 September] 1812 this battalion was attacked by 200 peasants armed with lances near the country house of the Golitsyn family after a large supply of food was seized and loaded onto 26 wagons. They were pursued by Cossacks who managed to blow up 15 wagons.

Boris was seriously wounded and died six months later in Vilnius. The estate passed to his brother Dmitry Vladimirovich, who was the hero of the Patriotic War of 1812 and became military governor-general of Moscow in 1820. Vyaziomy was famous for its collections. The Golitsyns' family archive was kept here. In 1844 Vyazyomy was inherited by Boris Dmitrievich Golitsyn. The last owner of Vyaziomy was Dmitry Borisovich Golitsyn. During the years of his possession a new bell tower was built and the church building was repaired. In 1899, one of the first handicraft cooperative organizations in Russia was founded in Bolshye Vyazyomy. The Peasant Theater in Vyazyomy was considered to be one of the most prominent peasant theaters of its time and was visited by Leo Tolstoy.

In 1908, Golitsyn made up his mind, stimulated by the Stolypin reform to make a leased datcha settlement on his estate. In 1929, during the Soviet period, a collective farm was established on the expropriated properties of the Golitsyns. In 1935 a military airfield was built near the village of Malye Vyazyomy ('Little Vyaziomy'; Bolshiye Vyaziomy means 'Great Vyazyomy'), a paratrooper school was established in the former palace, and a training center for tank drivers in 1940. In 1943, the evacuation hospitals in Vyazyomy were closed, and a horse breeding research institute was opened in the manor; it was later renamed the Zootechnical institute, which was replaced by a phytopathology scientific research institute.

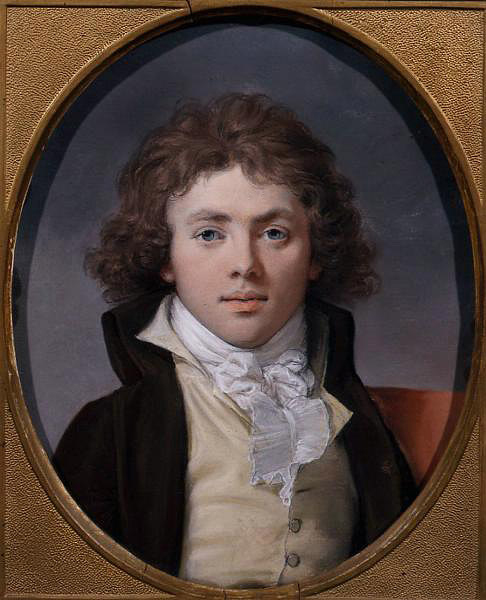
Boris Vladimirovich Golitsyn

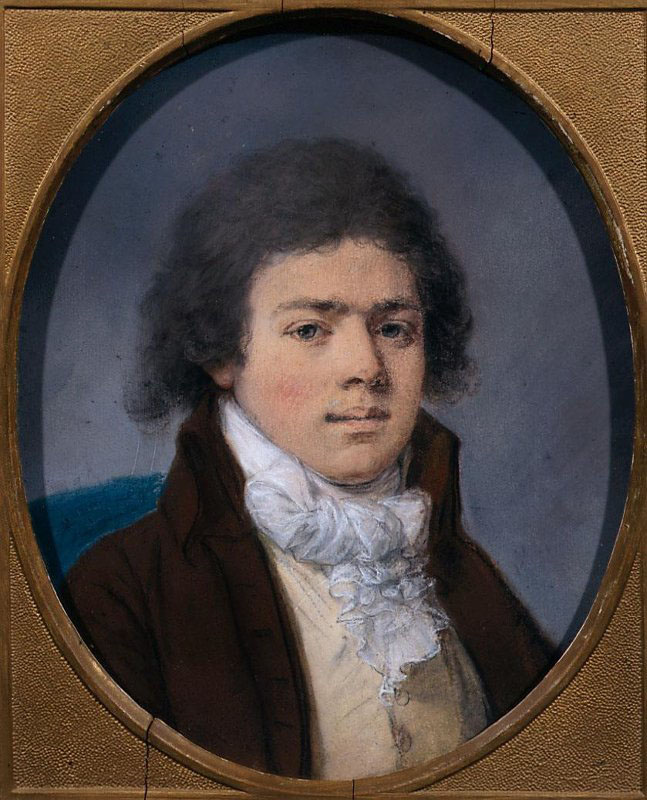
Dmitry Golitsyn

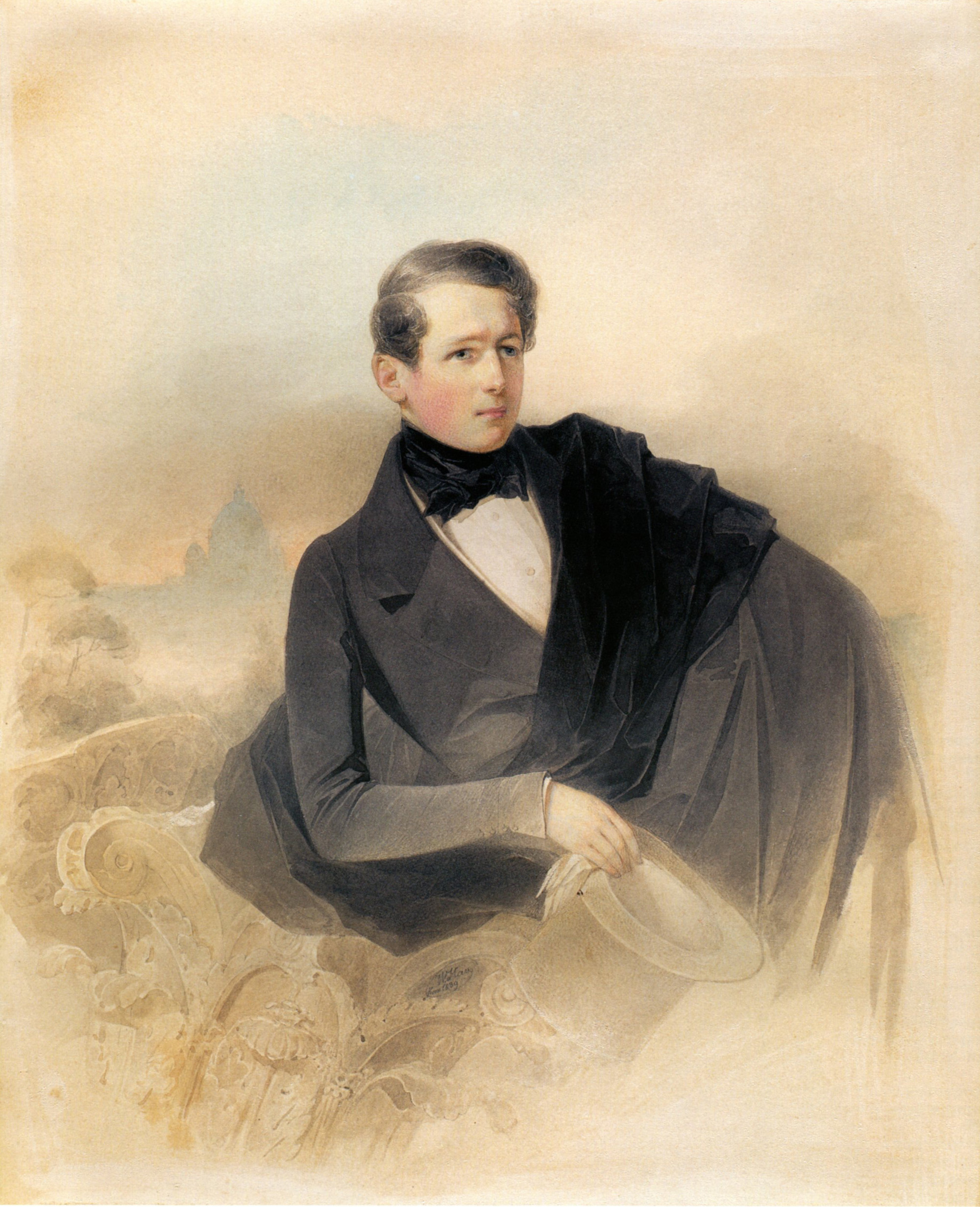
Boris D. Golitsyn
(1819–1878)

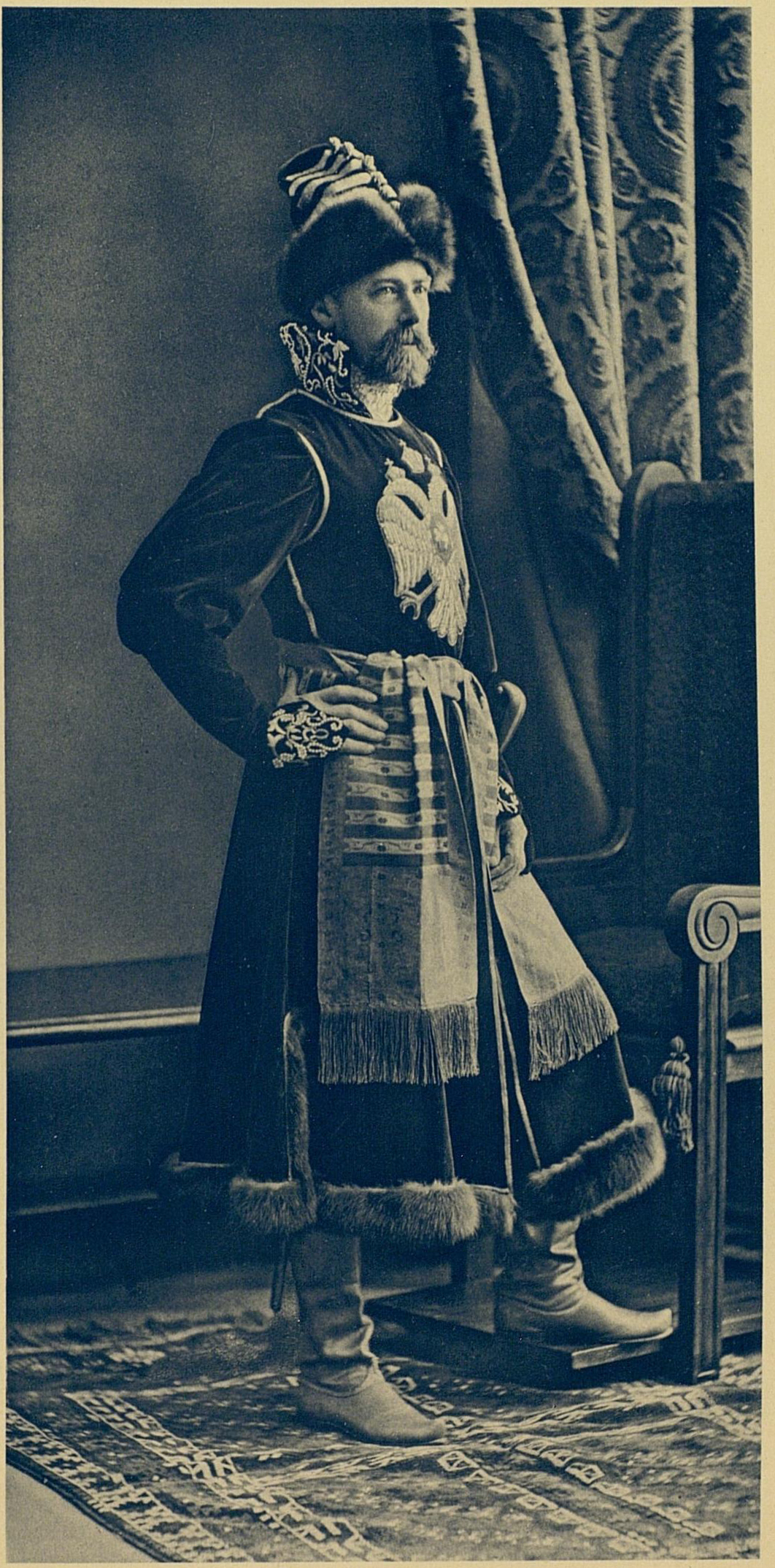
Dmitry B. Golitsyn
(1851–1920)

== Pushkin Museum ==
A few kilometers away is the Zakharovo manor, where Alexander Pushkin spent most summers between 1805 and 1810. In 1999, the manor house of Maria Alekseyevna Gannibal, Pushkin's maternal grandmother who married a son of Abram Petrovich Gannibal, was renovated, and became the state historical and literary museum reserve of Pushkin. It is the site of an annual event called "Tradition" which describes itself as a family art festival.
