= Ekaterina Vladimirovna Apraksina =

Russian noblewoman

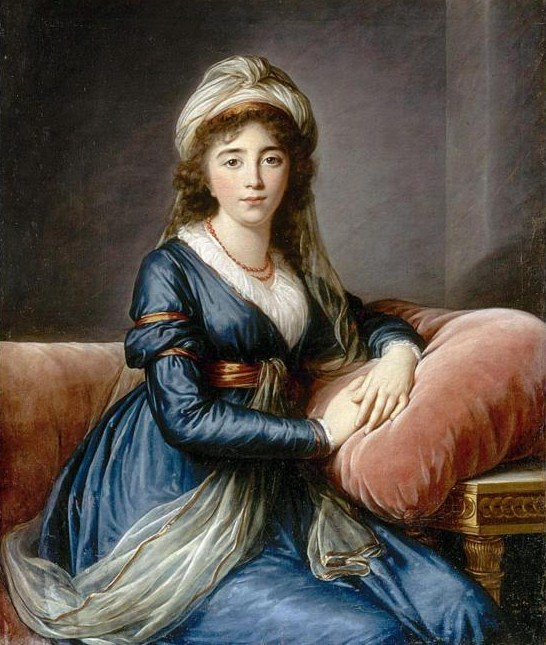
- Portrait of Ekaterina Vladimirovna Apraksina by Elisabeth Vigée-Le Brun, 1796.
- Native name: Екатери́на Влади́мировна Апра́ксина
- Born: 30 May 1770; Moscow, Russian Empire
- Died: 14 March 1854 (aged 83); Moscow, Russian Empire
- Noble family: House of Golitsyn (by birth); House of Apraksin (by marriage)
- Spouse: Stepan Stepanovich Apraksin (m. 1793)
- Issue: Natalia Stepanovna, Vladimir Stepanovich, Stepan Stepanovich, Sofia Stepanovna, Agrippina Stepanovna
- Father: Prince Vladimir Borisovich Golitsyn
- Mother: Natalya
- Occupation: Lady-in-waiting

Ekaterina Vladimirovna Apraksina (Russian: Екатери́на Влади́мировна Апра́ксина; née Golitysna [Голи́цына]; 30 May 1770, Moscow - 14 March 1854) was a Russian noblewoman.

== Life ==
The eldest daughter of prince Vladimir Borisovich Golitsyn and his wife Natalya, she was educated by her mother. She had two brothers, Boris and Dmitri, as well as a sister Sophie (later Sophie Stroganova). In 1783 she and her family moved to France and they settled in a palace in Paris next door to Marie Antoinette, with Ekaterina and her mother attending balls and receptions. She and her family toured England in 1789 before returning to Russia the following year, settling in St Petersburg, where she was presented at court and became a lady in waiting to Catherine the Great. She was known for her great beauty, earning her the moniker "Venus en Courroux" (the angry Venus). In 1793 she married Stepan Stepanovich Apraksin, a military leader with close connections to the royal family. In 1794, she also became a lady in waiting to Grand Duchess Elena Pavlovna of Russia.

In 1819, Louisa Adams, wife of John Quincy Adams, visited St. Petersburg and there met Ekaterina. Louisa Adams described her impressions of Ekaterina after this chance encounter, which took place at the home of their mutual acquaintance, Condesa Colombi. By this time, Ekaterina and her husband lived primarily in Moscow, where the family dwelt in a palace, which reportedly could house 500 people.

Louisa Adams did not seem to get along with Ekaterina, who was visiting St. Petersburg, and Adams described Ekaterina as coarse, and enjoying discussing scandals. Before Adams could take her leave, Ekaterina reportedly insisted on using cards to tell Adams' fortune.

== Marriage and issue ==
On 13 July 1793 she married general Stepan Stepanovich Apraksin (1757-1827), a cousin of her mother, one of the richest men in Russia and considered to be one of the handsomest men of the time. It was a happy marriage and they had five children:

- Natalia Stepanovna (14 November 1794 – 7 May 1890), married Sergei Golitsyn (17 February 1783 – 14 March 1833), died without issue;
- Vladimir Stepanovich (1796-1833), married Sofia Petrovna Tolstoy (1800-1886);
- Stepan Stepanovich (5 December 1797 – 15 December 1799);
- Sofia Stepanovna (1798-1885), married Aleksey Grigorevich Scerbatov, with whom she had five children;
- Agrippina Stepanovna (5 December 1799 – 13 August 1800).

== Sources ==
- http://www.vostlit.info/Texts/Dokumenty/Kavkaz/XIX/1840-1860/Poltorackij/text1.htm
