= Tatiana Vasilyevna Golitsyna =

Russian noblewoman and philanthropist

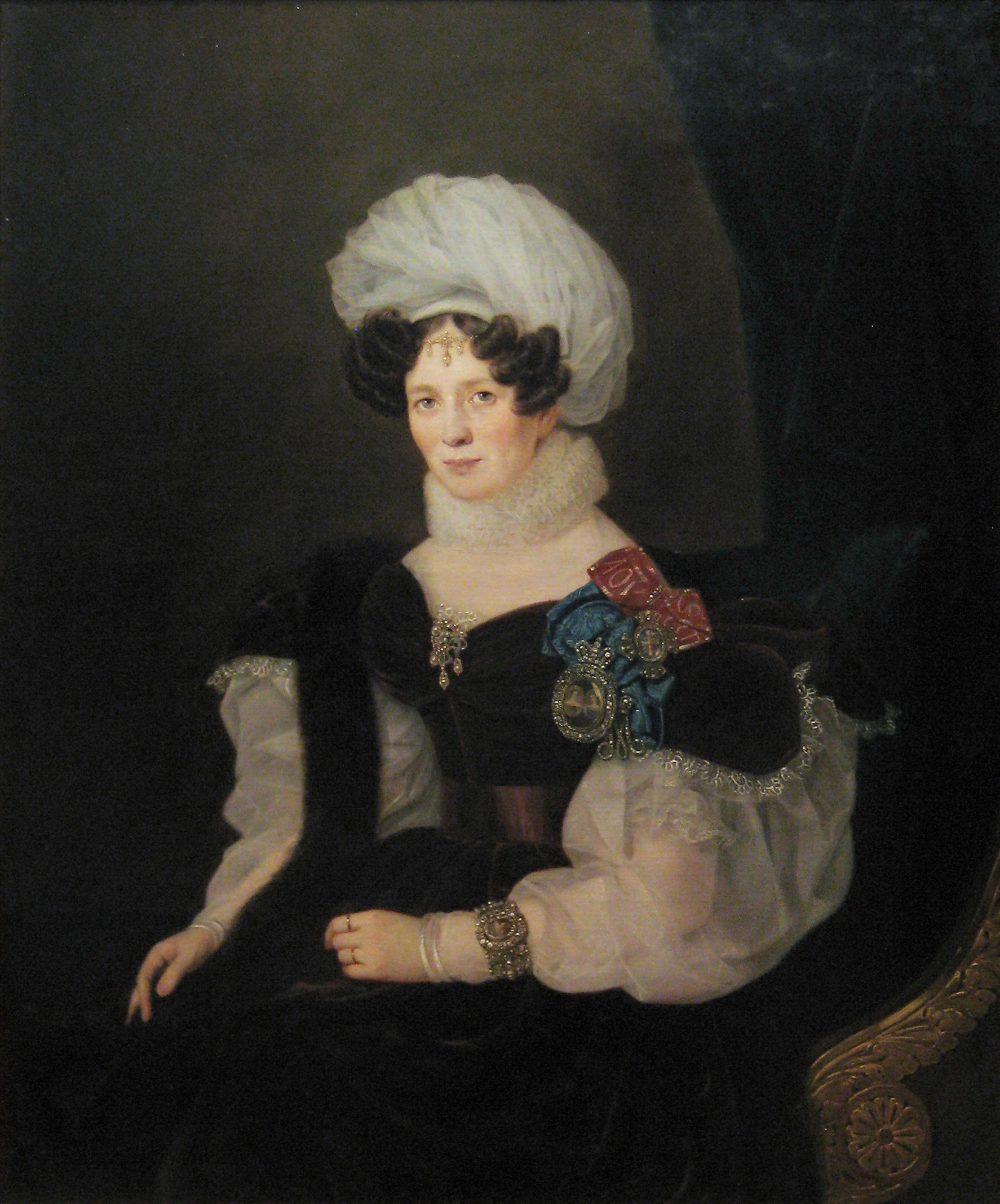
Golitsyna in 1835

Tatiana Vasilyevna Golitsyna (née Vasilchikova; 7 January 1783 – 28 January 1841) was a Russian courtier and philanthropist. She was married to Dmitry Golitsyn. She served as maid of honour between 1797 and 1800.

== Sources ==
- Домовая церковь святых мучениц Софии и Татианы при детской клинической больнице им. Н.Ф. Филатова (бывшей Софийской) (in Russian)
