= Stepan Stepanovich Apraksin =

Russian military commander and aristocrat

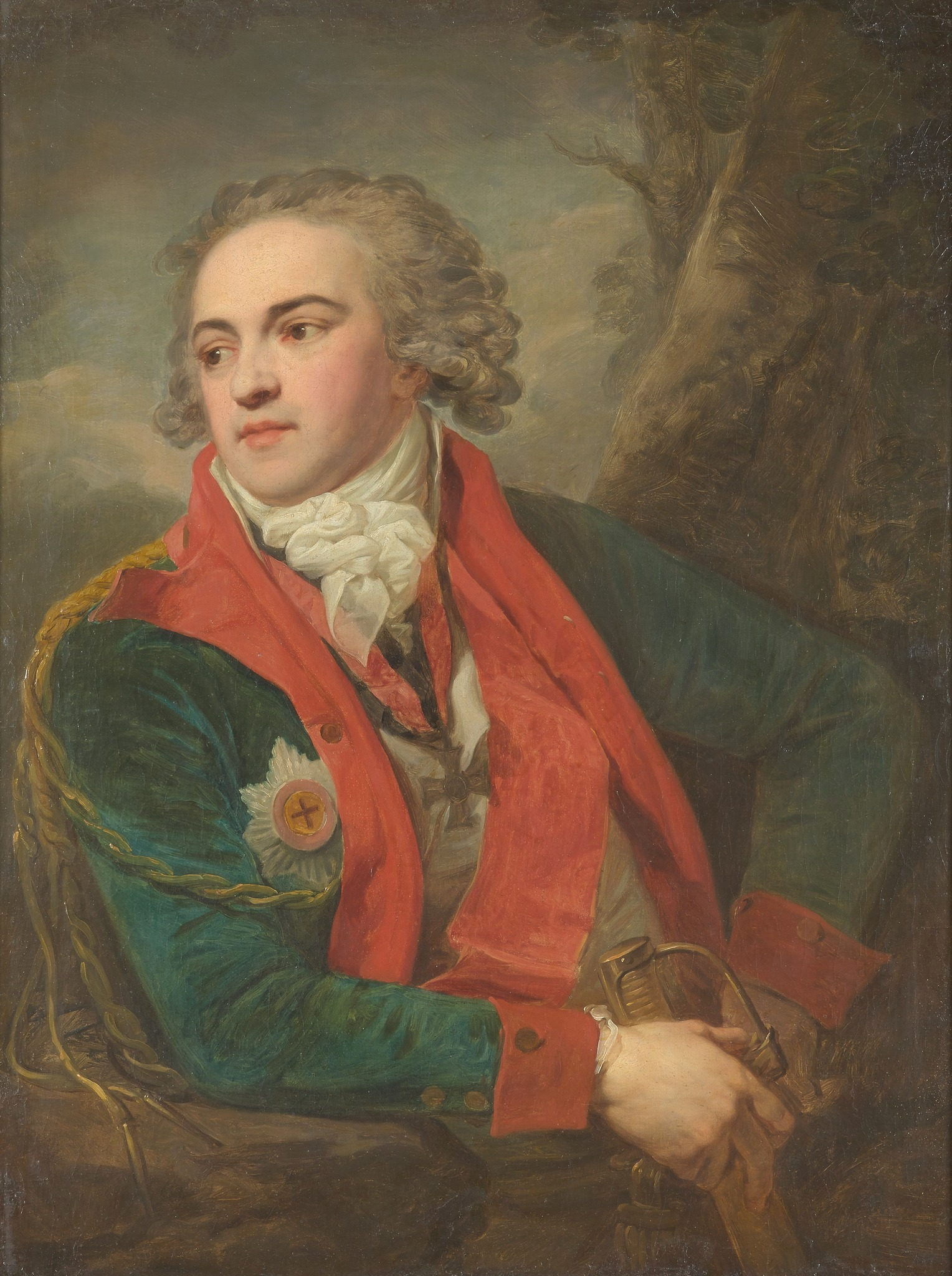
Portrait by Johann Baptist von Lampi the Elder, 1793.

Stepan Stepanovich Apraksin (Russian: Степа́н Степа́нович Апра́ксин, 24 June 1757, Riga – 20 February 1827) was a Russian military commander and aristocrat. He was the only son of Stepan Fedorovich Apraksin, likewise a famed military commander and a high-ranking military commander in the Russian army.

Stepan Stepanovich Apraksin was born in 1757 in Riga, in the Governorate of Livonia of the Russian Empire. He started his military career at the age of ten, after being admitted to the Semenovsky Regiment. Initially serving with the rank of ensign, he received military training there and in 1772 he started active service with the army in the rank of captain. Transferred to Kiev, he served as an officer in the local infantry regiment. With his unit he took part in the Russo-Turkish War of 1768–1774. For his service in the Crimean campaign, in 1777 he was promoted to the rank of Colonel.

Quickly rising through the ranks of the tsarist army, in 1783 Apraksin was promoted to the rank of Brigadier and attached to the 20th Astrakhan Regiment, with which he fought with distinction in the Caucasus. In 1786 he was again promoted, this time to the rank of Major General. Appointed the commander of Astrakhan Dragoon Regiment, he took part in the famous siege of Ochakov during the Russo-Turkish War of 1787–1792. After the end of hostilities Apraksin was promoted to the rank of Lieutenant General and in 1794 he took part in suppression of Kościuszko's Uprising in Poland. Following the Third Partition of Poland, he commanded the border troops at the new frontiers with Austria and Turkey.

In 1798, at the age of 41, he retired from active service, supposedly due to serious illness. However, soon after the coronation of Alexander I of Russia he returned to the army and in 1803 was made the governor of Smolensk. During the Napoleonic Wars he again assumed the role of a front-line commander and took part in the fights as a commander of the 16th infantry division. After 1809 he finally retired and settled in Moscow, where he ultimately died in 1827.

== Family ==
Apraksin was married to Ekaterina née Golitsin, a daughter of a mighty Russian aristocratic family. They had three children: two daughters and a son, Vladimir Apraksin (b. 1796), who later became the aide to tsar Alexander I.
