= Rostopchin =

Rostopchin or Rostopchina is the name of:

- Fyodor Rostopchin (1763–1826), Russian statesman
- Catherine Rostopchin (1776–1859), Russian writer, wife of Fyodor
- Countess of Ségur (née Countess Sofiya Fyodorovna Rostopchina; 1799-1874), French writer of Russian birth, daughter of Fyodor
- Yevdokiya Rostopchina (1811–1858), Russian poet, daughter-in-law of Fyodor

== See also ==
- Rostopschin, a bonus in tarock games
