= House of Golitsyn =

Russian princely family

House of Golitsyn Голицыны
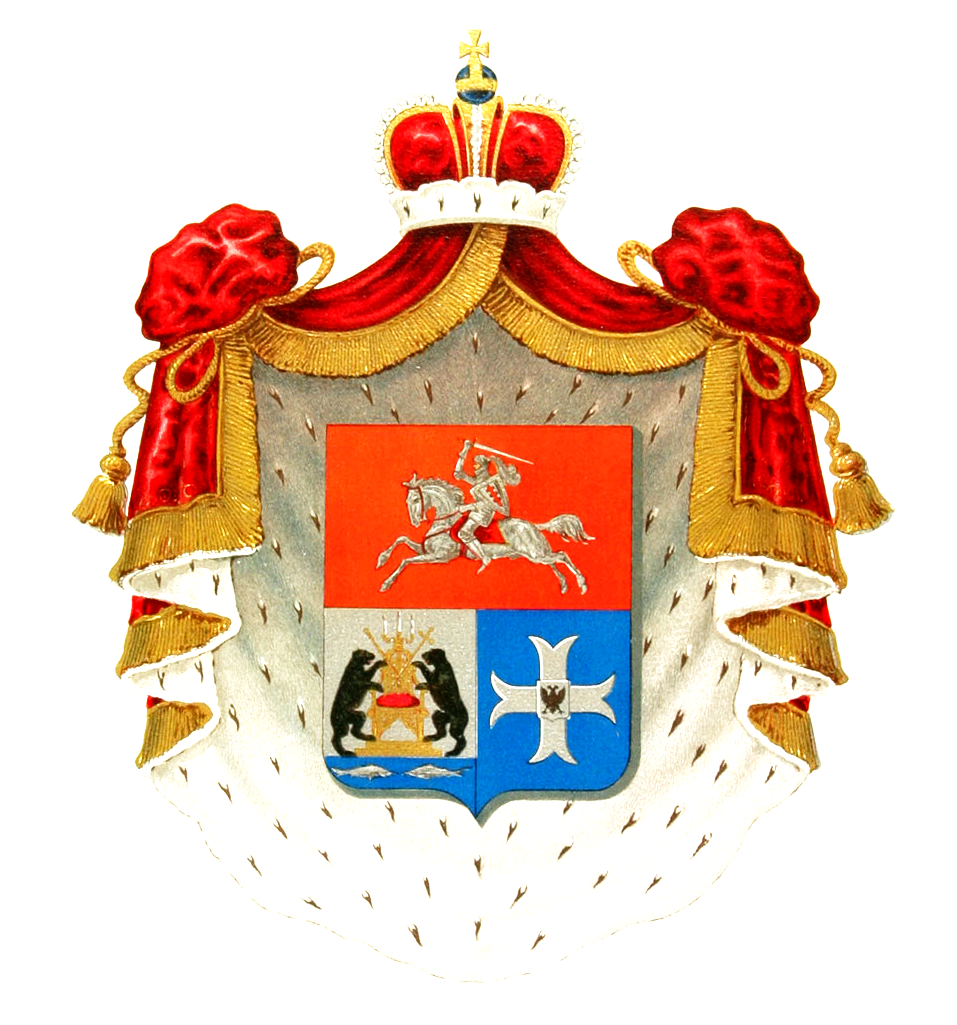
- Parent house: House of Gediminas
- Country: Grand Duchy of Moscow; Tsardom of Russia; Russian Empire
- Founded: 15th century
- Founder: Mikhail Ivanovich Bulgakov Golitsa
- Titles: Prince
- Motto: Vir est Vis

The House of Golitsyn (Note: Also romanized as Galitzine (French), Galitzin, Gallitzin (German), Golicyn (Italian), Golitsin (Spanish) and other variants.) (Russian: Голи́цыны, romanized: Golítsyny, IPA: [ɡɐˈlʲitsɨnɨ]) (Note: Masculine singular: Голи́цын, Golitsyn, IPA: [ɡɐˈlʲitsɨn]; feminine singular: Голи́цына, Golitsyna, IPA: [ɡɐˈlʲitsɨnə].) is the second largest and noblest Princely house in Russia. Among its members were voivodes, landlords, knyazes (princes), knights, diplomats, prime ministers, admirals, stewards, state counsellors, and other statesmen.

The Golitsyns claim their seniority in the Lithuanian dynasty of Gediminas (the Gediminids) which has existed since the 13th century. Descendants of this family in Europe and the west write their name in the form Galitzine. The family is among the first Russian aristocratic dynasties and its members bear the honorific predicate of Serene Highness.

The family produced many well-known statesmen and figures of the Russian Empire, among them notably Vasily, Boris, Dmitry and Nikolai Golitsyn, the last chairman of the Council of Ministers of the Russian Empire.

Numerous pieces of art or geographic locations were named after the family, such as the Galitzin Triptych created by Pietro Perugino in 1485 or the Galitzine Quartet No. 12 commissioned by Nikolai Galitzin and delivered by Ludwig van Beethoven in 1825, the Golitsyn craters A and B on the far side of the Moon, the Gallitzinberg, in Vienna, the Gallitzin borough in Pennsylvania, the Gallitzin Tunnel and Gallitzin State Forest, the Golitsyn Hospital in Moscow and various places, localities and municipalities in Russia.

== Origins ==
According to legend, the family descends from Lithuanian prince Jurgis (George), son of Patrikas and grandson of Narimantas and thus a great-grandson of Gediminas (d. 1341), Grand Duke of Lithuania. (Note: Other descendants of Patrikas are the Houses of Kurakins and Khovanski, other Gediminids (descendants of Gediminas) were the royal Jagiellonian dynasty of Polish-Lithuanian Commonwealth (a cadet branch of Gediminids) and a number of princely families of the Commonwealth (Czartoryski, Sanguszko, Koriatowicz-Kurcewicz e.a.) and Russia (Bulgakov, Trubetskoy, Mstislavsky, Belsky and Volynsky).) After the extinction of the Korecki family in the 17th century, the Golitsyns claimed dynastic seniority in the House of Gediminas.

Prince George immigrated to the court of Vasily I of Moscow and married Vasily's sister. His children and grandchildren, among them Yuriy Patrikeyevich, were considered premier Russian boyars. One of them, Prince Mikhail Ivanovich Bulgakov (1466–1554), grandson of Yuriy, earned the nickname Golitsa after the gauntlet (голица, golitsa) he wore on his left hand. His son Yuri Mikhailovich Bulgakov continued with the family line Golytsin and his great-grandson Prince Vasily Golitsyn was a claimant to the Russian throne during the Time of Troubles and went as an ambassador to Poland to offer the Russian crown to Prince Władysław; he died in prison. (Note: All living members of the House of Golitsyn are also descendants of Ivan the Great and his second wife Sophia Palaiologina. through their daughter Eudoxia Ivanovna (1492–1513) who married Peter (born Kudaikul), son of Ibrahim, Khan of Kazan, whose daughter Anastasia Petrova married Fyodor Mstislavsky.)

Peter I of Russia permitted the Golitsyns to incorporate the coat of arms of the Grand Duchy of Lithuania into their coat of arms; “Vir est Vis”, or "man himself is power”, is the Golitsyn family motto.

== Notable Golitsyns ==
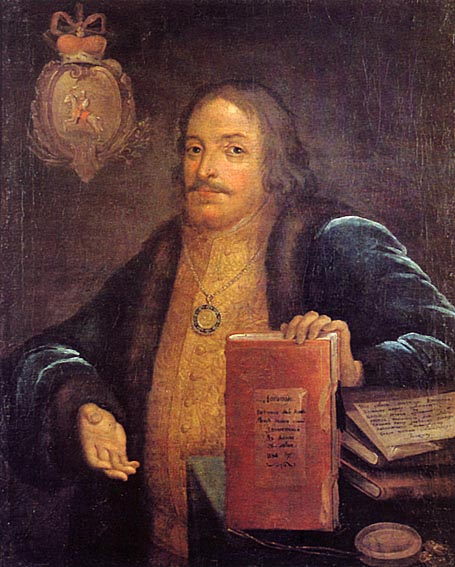
Vasily Golitsyn. The Velvet Book was an official register of genealogies of Russia's most illustrious families (Russian nobility).

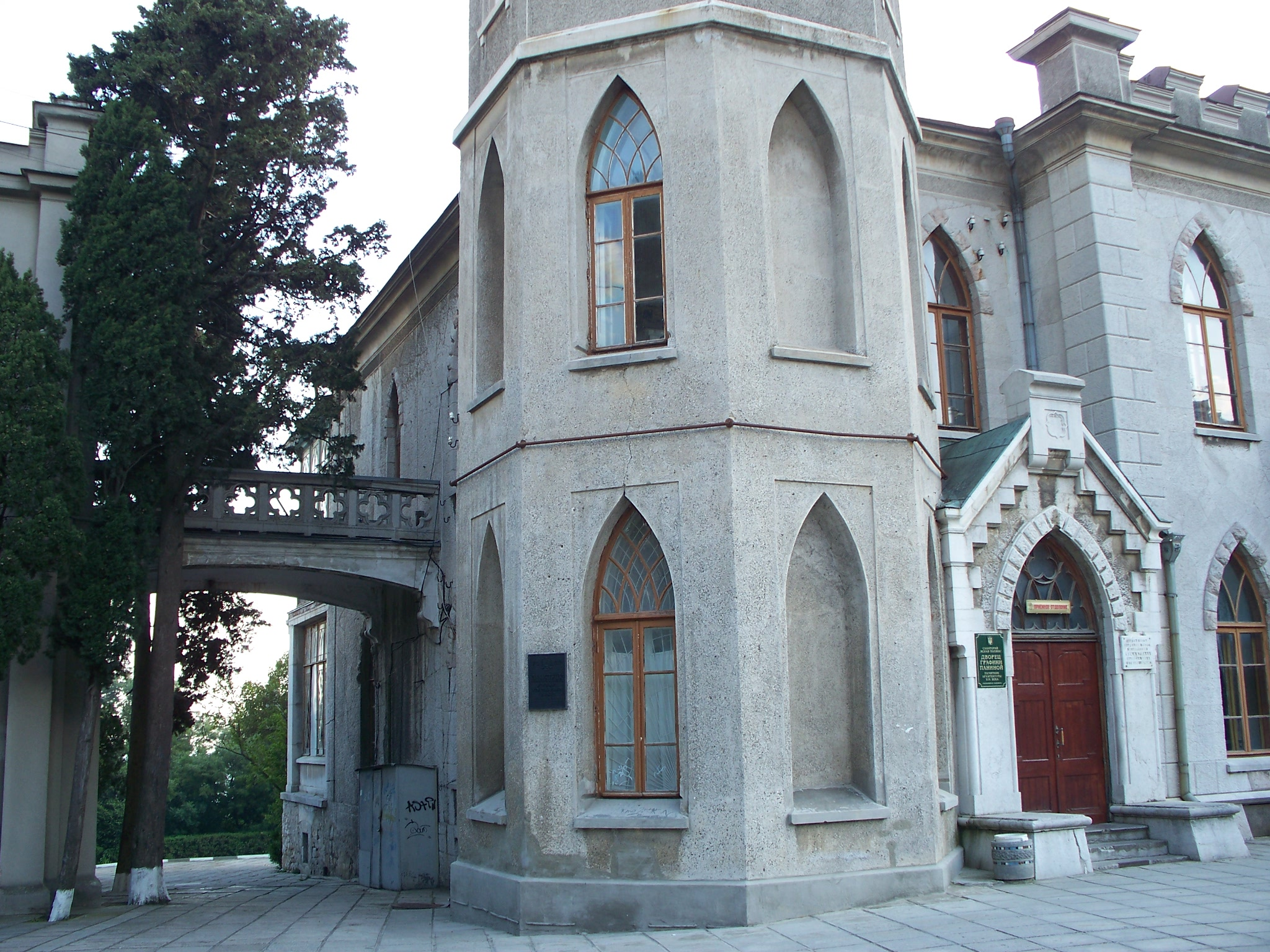
Golitsyn Palace in Gaspra (Crimea)

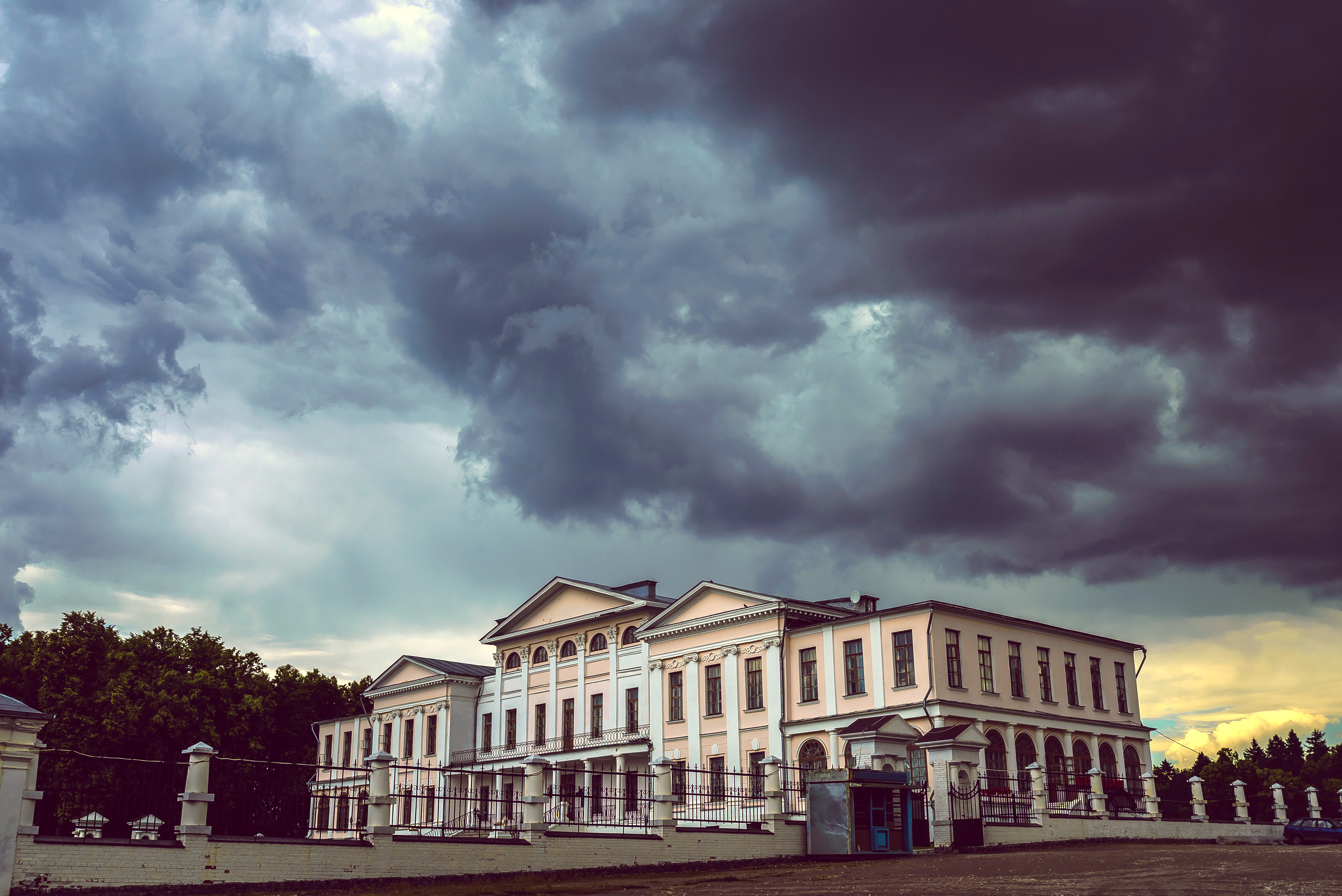
Dubrovitsy Estate

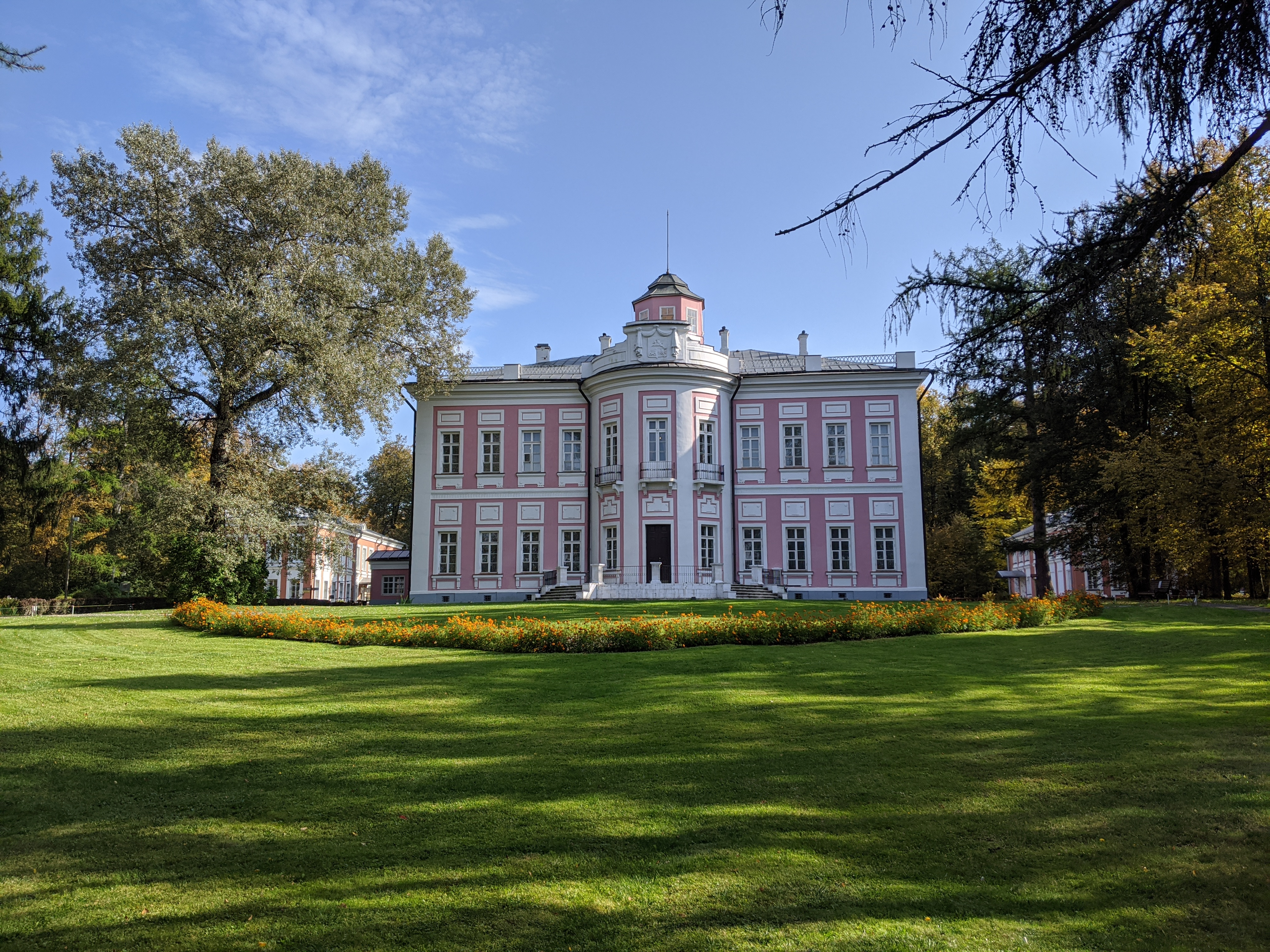
Vyazyomy Manor

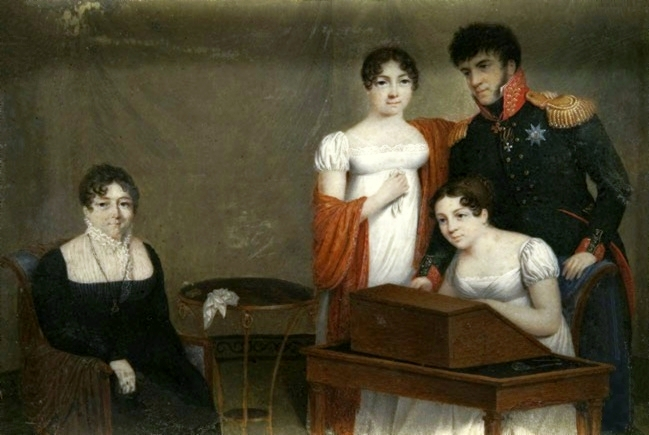
A Golitsyn family by Vladimir Borovikovsky (1810), National Museum in Warsaw

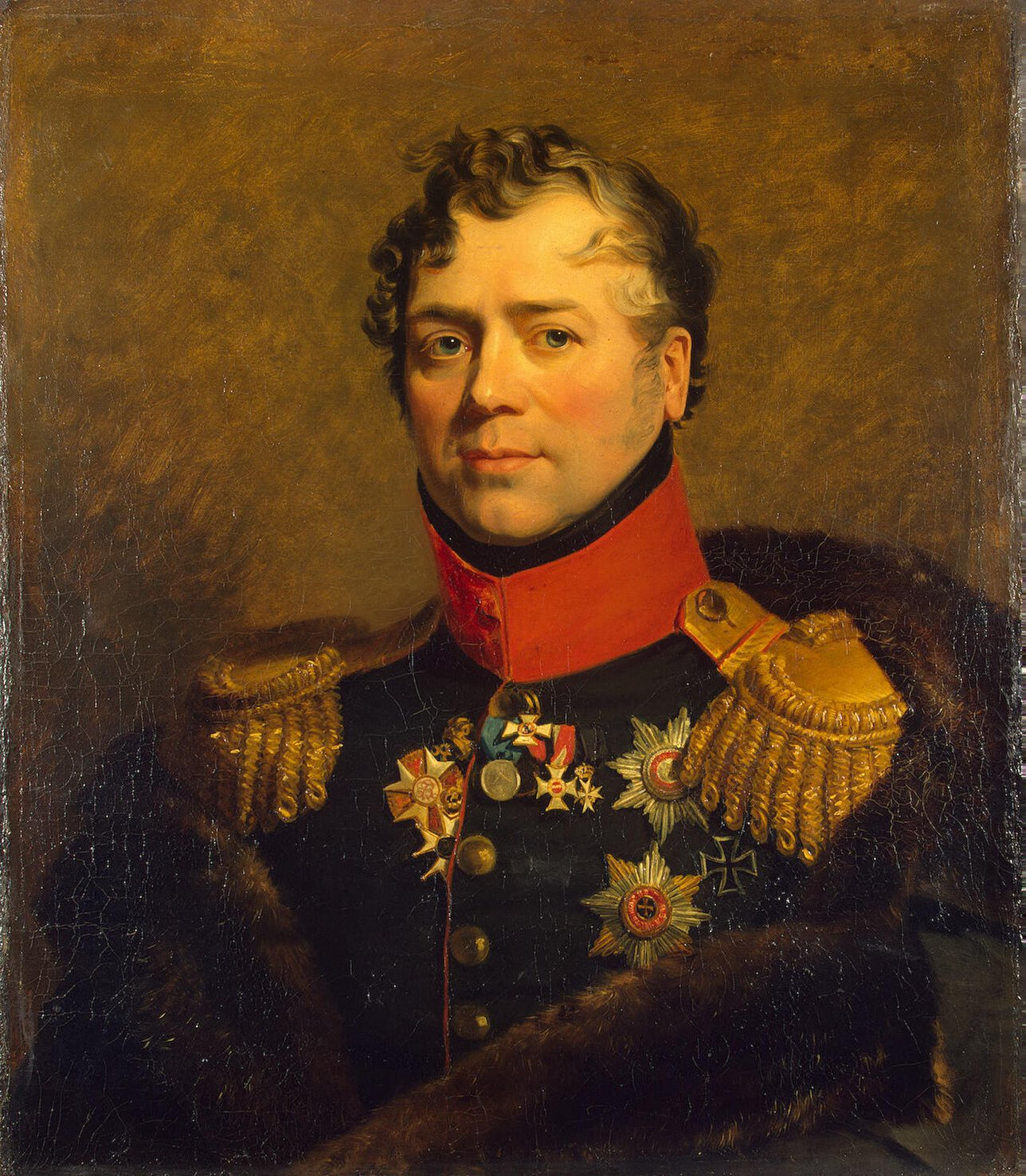
Dmitriy Vladimirovich Golitsyn. Military Gallery of the Winter Palace, State Hermitage Museum (Saint Petersburg)

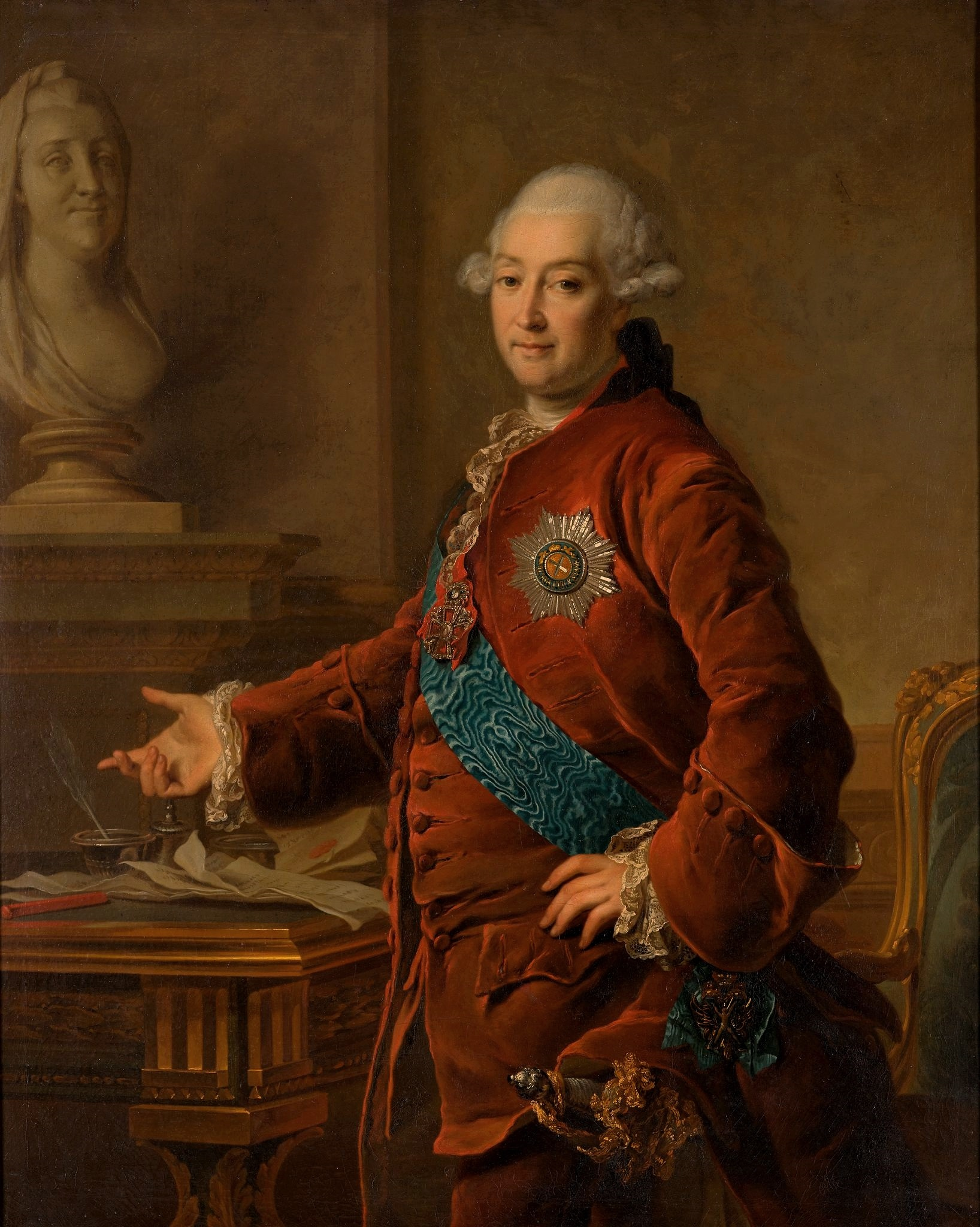
Alexander Mikhailovich Golitsyn, a 1772 portrait by Dmitry Levitzky

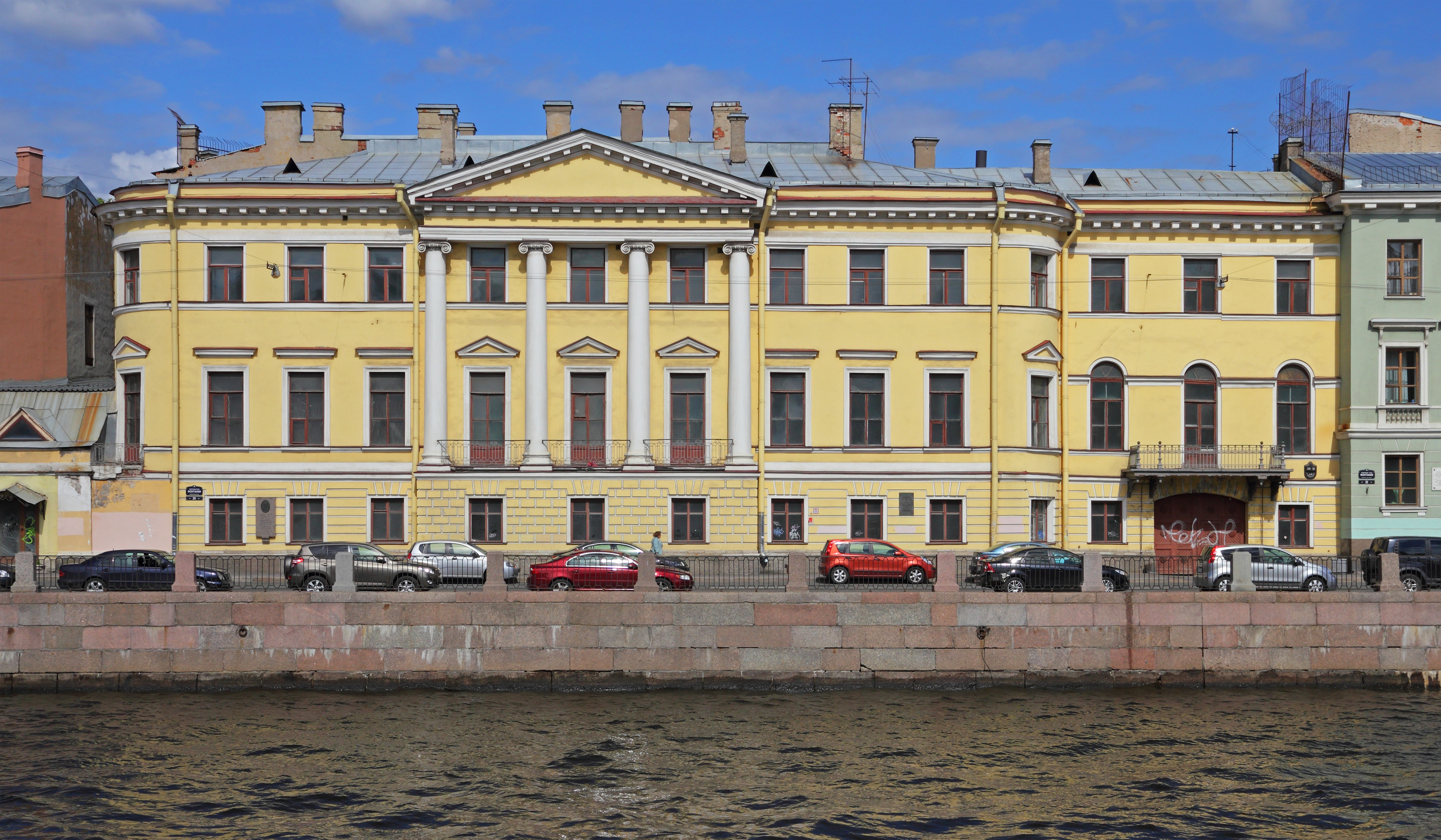
House of Prince Golitsyn on Fontanka, 20

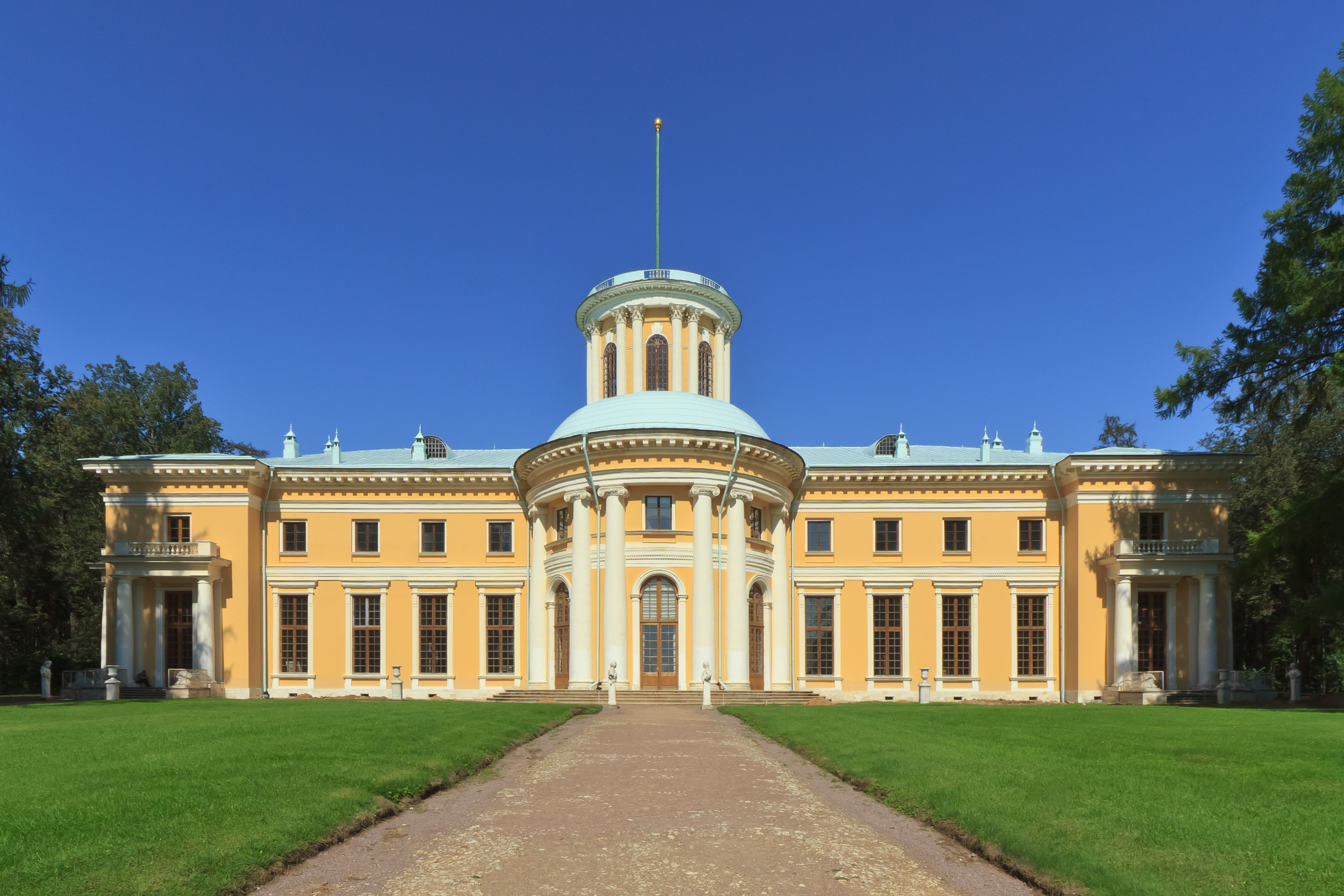
Arkhangelskoye Palace

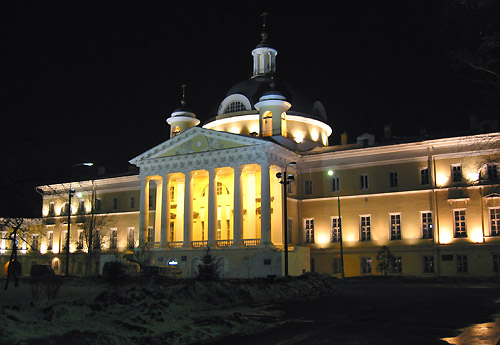
Golitsyn Hospital

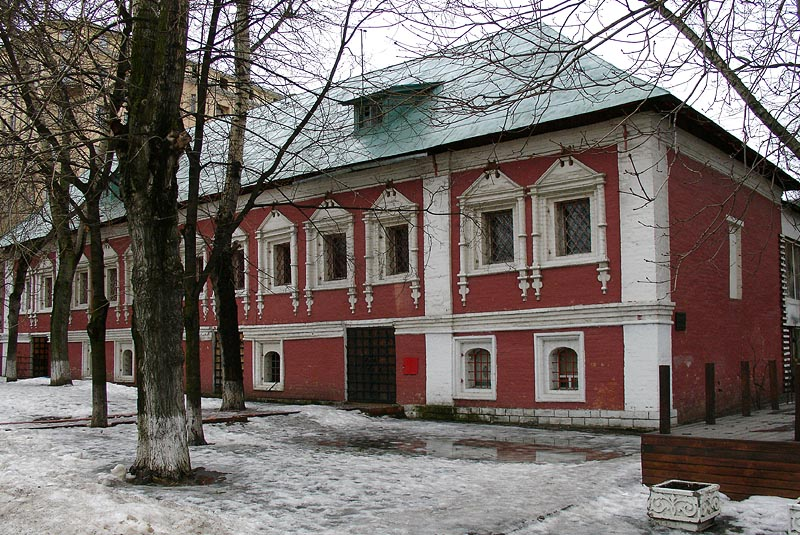
17th century estate of Fedor Golovin in Khamovniki District, later Golitsyn family

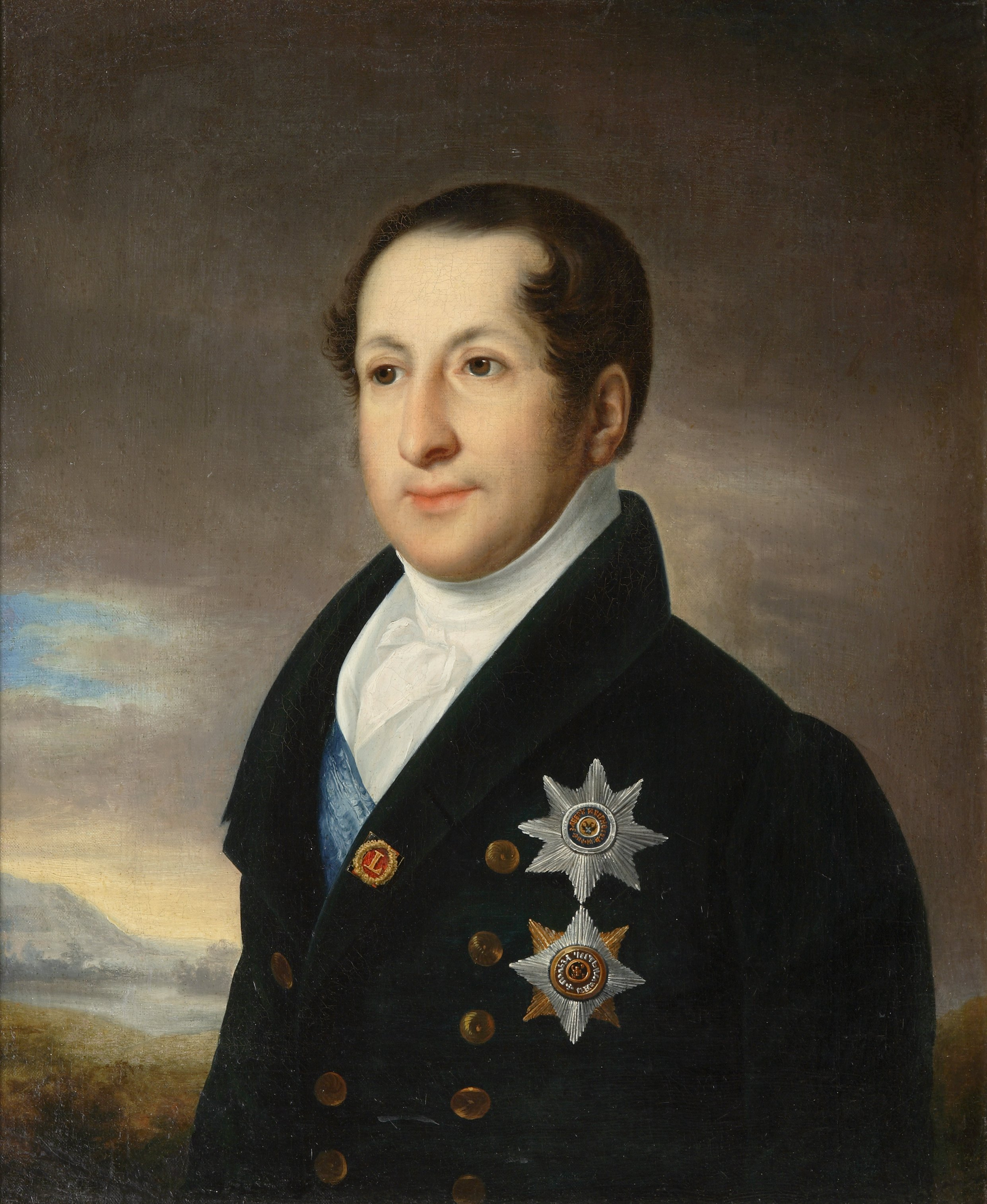
Sergey Mikhailovich Golytsin, the founder of the hospital, by V. Tropinin

Prince (knyaz) Andrey Andreyevich Golitsyn (d. 1638), governor of Siberia (1633–1635), was the ancestor of all existing princes Golitsyns. He had four sons, from whom four branches of the Golitsyn family descended:

- Vasily (1618–1652) – branch Vasilyevich
- Ivan (d. 1690) – branch Ivanovich, which ended in 1751 in a monastery
- Alexey (1632–1694) – branch Alexeevich
- Michael (1639–1687) – branch Mikhailovich

By the 18th century, the family was divided into four major branches. One branch died out while the other three and their subdivisions contained about 1,100 members.

=== Branch Vasilyevich ===
- Vasily Vasilyevich Golitsyn (1643–1714) was a leading boyar, a Russian statesman, combining military duties with civilian pursuits, de facto head of the government during the regency of Sophia Alekseyevna (1682–1689) over her brother Ivan and half-brother Peter the Great who banished him and his family to Arkhangelsk Oblast. He owned a richly decorated mansion in Moscow which became the location of the State Duma.
  - Aleksey Vasilyevich Golitsyn (1665–1740) In 1683, he received from his grandfather a village south of Moscow, now Tsaritsyno Palace and surrounding park. In 1694 he was stripped of his boyardom (with the retention of the princely title) and the Tsar sent him and his family into exile. He returned in 1726, after the death of Peter I.
    - Mikhail Alekseyevich Golitsyn (1687–1775) nicknamed "the fool" was punished by Empress Anna of Russia for converting to Catholicism in order to marry an Italian or German woman. This marriage was declared illegal and she appointed him court jester in 1738, serving kvass to the guests. Two years later she forced him to marry either a Kalmuck or a female jester from Kamchatka. The "mock wedding" which took place inside a two-room ice palace on the Neva in February 1740 during an extremely cold winter remained famous. He moved to his estate and was buried near Pushkino.
    - Sergei Alekseyevich Golitsyn (1695–1758), served as the Moscow governor, director of the Moscow Mint.
      - Nikolai Sergeyevich Golitsyn (1712–1773)
        - Alexander Nikolayevich Golitsyn (1773–1844), was a lifelong bachelor, homosexual and reactionary minister of education in the government of Alexander I. He headed an investigation into masonic involvement in the Decembrist uprising of 1825 and served as the Chairman of the State Council from 1838 to 1841; retired to his Crimean estate in Neo-Gothic style.
      - Aleksey Sergeyevich Golitsyn (1723–1765) was the ancestor of Nikolai Dmitriyevich Golitsyn, the last prime minister of Imperial Russia.

=== Branch Alexeevich ===
- Aleksey Andreyevich Golitsyn (1632–1694), governor of Siberia, of Kiev.
  - Boris Alekseyevich Golitsyn (1654–1714), a cousin and the chief political opponent of Vasily Vasilyevich, was tutor and participated in the coup that placed Peter the Great on the throne; head of the government during the "Great Embassy" of 1697–98; owner of the estates Bolshiye Vyazyomy and Dubrovitsy.
    - Vasili Borisovich Golitsyn (1681–1710) inherited the estate, but died when the ceiling came down.
      - Mikhail Vasilievich Golitsyn (1702–1749)
        - Nikolay Mikhailovich Golitsyn (1729–1799) became the new owner of Bolshiye Vyazyomy in 1766.
      - Boris Vasilievich Golitsyn (1705–1769), admiral
        - Vladimir Borisovich Golitsyn (1731–1798) was a Russian statesman; his wife Natalya Golitsyna was known as a learned woman, a gambler and a good dancer. She served Catherine the Great and was characterized in The Queen of Spades (story). In 1783 she moved with her daughters Ekaterina and Sophie to Paris and visited her sons; all the Golitsyns returned to Russia in 1791.
          - Boris Vladimirovich Golitsyn (1769–1813) was a Russian aristocrat who received his education in Strasbourg (1782), and attended the École militaire in Paris (1786). The correspondence of the elder of the Golitsyn brothers attests to his deep interest in analyzing and comprehending the events of the French Revolution. He became very hostile to the turn of events and joined the Swedish army to fight against Revolutionary France. In 1803, Boris Vladimirovich received the estate of Vyazemy from Nikolai Mikhailovich Golitsyn (1729–1799), interested in agriculture, horse breeding, but without issue. Boris fought in the battle of Smolensk, was wounded in the battle of Borodino and died in Vilnius.
          - Dmitri Vladimirovich Golitsyn (1771–1844) attended the École Militair also, which Napoleon had left in 1785. On 14 July 1789 Dmitry was somehow involved in the Storming of the Bastille. He wrote his mother about the activities of the National Constituent Assembly (France). After a brief participation in the Finnish War Dmitry resigned his commission in 1809 and settled at Bolshiye Vyazyomy. At the end of August 1812 he was reappointed by Kutuzov. After the Battle of Borodino both Kutuzov and Napoleon spend a night on his estate along the road from Mozhaysk to Moscow. He fought in the Battle of Tarutino, Vyazma, and Krasny. In 1814 he was promoted to the rank of full General of the Cavalry. He governed Moscow for 25 years, but died in Paris. Member of the State Council (Russian Empire).
            - Vladimir Dmitrievich Golitsyn (1815–1888) married Maria Golitzyna.
  - Ivan Alekseyevich Golitsyn (1656/8–1729)
    - Alexei Ivanovich Golitsyn (1707–1739) died of plague in Constantinople.
      - Ivan Alekseyevich Golitsyn (1729–1767)
      - Pyotr Alekseyevich Golitsyn (1731–1810)
      - Dmitri Alekseyevich Gallitzin (1734/8–The Hague, 1803) was a Russian diplomat, art agent for Catherine the Great. The idea of acquiring not individual pictures but large collections "en bloc" came from Golitsyn. He was the main driving force behind the subsequent painting acquisitions in France. He was the Russian ambassador in Paris (1762–68); a friend of Falconet, Denis Diderot, a supporter of the physiocrats, and translated Helvétius. He was envoy in The Hague (1768–98), a supporter of the League of Armed Neutrality, the recognition of the United States and the abolition of serfdom. After 1789 he continued to defend his principles and never returned to Russia. In 1768 he married Adelheid Amalie Gallitzin. In 1774 the couple split and the Princess moved to a country house between The Hague and the beach, to better to oversee raising her children in a way J.J. Rousseau had promoted in his "Emile". She turned to Catholicism in 1786. He is known as volcanologist and mineralogist.
        - Prince Demetrius Augustine Gallitzin (The Hague, 1770–1840) also known as the "Apostle of the Alleghenies", grew up with prince William I of the Netherlands. In 1792 he embarked to Baltimore. He was the first Catholic priest ordained in the United States; a settlement in Pennsylvania is named after him. He is currently under investigation for possible sainthood, his current title being Servant of God.
  - Pyotr Alekseyevich Golitsyn (1660–1722)

=== Branch Mikhailovich ===
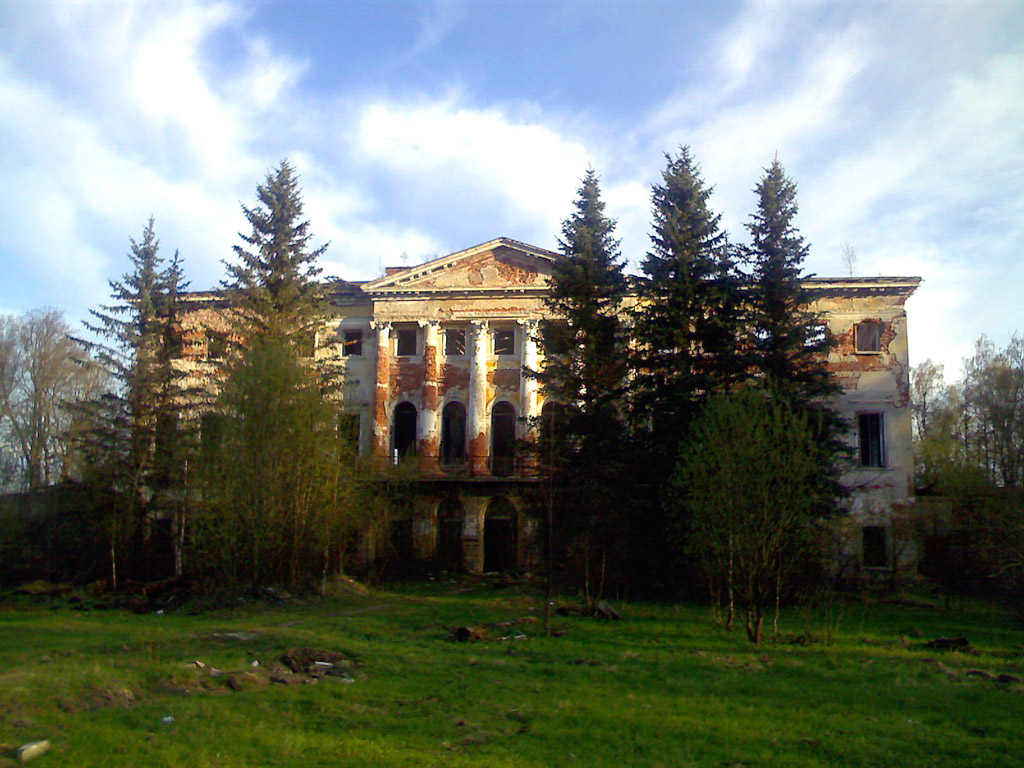
Grebnevo Estate in 2007

- Mikhail Andreyevich Golitsyn (1639–1687) was governor of Smolensk, Kiev and Kursk.
  - Dmitry Mikhailovich Golitsyn the Elder (1665–1737) opposed Peter's reforms. In 1727 he became a member of the Supreme Privy Council, which governed for Peter II of Russia. He was condemned to death (1736) for his anti-autocratic beliefs, but Anna of Russia commuted his sentence to life imprisonment. Noted for his attempt to turn Russia into a constitutional monarchy; Russia lived without autocracy for only 37 days. Owner of Arkhangelskoye Palace.
  - Mikhail Mikhailovich Golitsyn (Field Marshal) (Sr) (1675–1730) is best known for his governorship of Old Finland (1714–1721), where his harsh rule is remembered by the people he had conquered as the Greater Wrath (Swedish: Stora ofreden); member of the Supreme Privy Council. He was married twice and had 18 children.
    - Alexander Mikhailovich Golitsyn (1718–1783) was field-marshal wounded at the Battle of Kunersdorf, an envoy in Hamburg, Constantinople, ambassador in Dresden, and governor of Saint Petersburg, involved in the development of New Holland Island.
    - Dmitry Mikhailovich Golitsyn the Younger (1721–1793) was the Russian ambassador in Vienna. He married Ekaterina, a daughter of the Moldovan historian and composer Dimitrie Cantemir, and was the brother-in-law of Antiochus Cantemir. Primarily remembered for the Golitsyn Hospital he funded, he was also an art collector, advised Catherine the Great. He was a patron of Mozart, whom he invited to play once a week.
    - Nikolai Mikhailovich Golitsyn (1727–1787)
    - Andrey Mikhailovich Golitsyn (1729–1770)
      - Boris Andreevich Golitsyn (1766–1822) was a Russian general but was dismissed in 1800. He was friendly with Pyotr Bagration who died of gangrene on his estate at Sima, Vladimir Oblast. Boris joined the Napoleonic wars including three sons.
        - Prince Nikolai Borisovich Galitzin (1794–1866) was a military historian, an amateur cellist who commissioned Beethoven in 1822 to write his last string quartets, sometimes called the Galitzin quartets. He translated Pushkin's works into French and sent his translations to the author, with whom he was probably familiar since the late 1810s.
  - Mikhail Mikhailovich Golitsyn (admiral) (Jr) (1684–1764) was general admiral of the Russian fleet (1756); member of the Supreme Privy Council.
    - Alexander Mikhailovich Golitsyn (vice chancellor) (1723–1807) was a Russian envoy to Paris, and London. He contributed to the accession to the throne of Catherine II of Russia. In 1778, he retired and lived in Moscow, doing charitable work. He was the founder of the Golitsyn Hospital, and at the expense of his cousin D.M. Golitsyn. He was buried in the church of the Golitsyn Hospital, now the City Clinical Hospital No. 1.
    - Andrei Mikhailovich Golitsyn (1729–1770) married a daughter of Boris Grigoryevich Yusupov.
      - Alexey Andreevich Golitsyn (1767–1800) married Alexandra Petrovna Golitsyna
        - Pyotr Alexeyevich Golitsyn (1792–1842), a Catholic convert who moved to Paris
    - Mikhail Mikhailovich Golitsyn (1731–1804) was married to the wealthy Anna Alexandrovna Stroganova (1739–1816), who brought the estate Vlakhernskoye-Kuzminki as a dowry.
      - Alexander Mikhailovich Golitsyn (1772–1821) was an art collector.
      - Sergei Mikhailovich (1774–1859), director of the Golitsyn Hospital (1807–59), member of the State Council (1837–59) was married to Avdotya Ivanovna Golitsyna ("princesse Nocturne") the hostess of the St. Petersburg Salon. In 1817 he inherited the estate in Grebnevo, Moscow Oblast. As he died without issue the inheritance went to his nephew, the bibliophile, who died the year after.

== 19th century ==
- Valerian Mikhailovich Golitsyn (1803–1859) was the only Decembrist from the Golitsyn family who was convicted and sentenced to exile in Siberia.
- Pyotr Alexeyevich Golitsyn was the father of
  - Anton Petrovich Golitsyn (1818–1883) married Adélaïde Marie Angèle de Molette de Morangiès
  - Maria Petrovna Golitsyn (1820–1890) married Count Ferdinand Louise Marie de Bertier de Sauvigny
  - Augustin Petrovich Golitsyn (1823–1875), married Stéphanie de la Roche Aymon
    - Sophie Galitzine (1858–1883) married Paul d'Albert de Luynes, 10th Duke of Chaulnes and Picquigny.
  - Pyotr Petrovich Golitsyn (1827–1902), married (1) Yuliya Aleksandrovna Chertkova (2) Natalia Alexandrovna Kozakov
  - Aleksandra Petrovna Golitsyn (1830–1917), married Count Arsen Antoni Ludwik Moszczeński
- Princess Yelizaveta Alexeyevna Golitsyna (1797–1844) was the daughter of Alexandra Petrovna Golitsyna and the sister of Pyotr Alexeyevich Golitsyn. She became a Roman Catholic nun
- Mikhail Alexandrovich Golitsyn (1804–1860) was diplomat, writer and connoisseur of fine arts, who lived in Madrid and Rome, and turned catholic. He was a bibliophile and the owner of a splendid library.
  - Sergey Mikhailovich (1843–1915) opened the Golitsyn Museum, now part of the Pushkin Museum in Moscow, but sold his collection in 1886 to the Hermitage
- Prince Alexei Vasilyevich Golitsyn (1832–1901) was a friend of Pyotr Ilyich Tchaikovsky. Like the composer, Golitsyn was homosexual; but unlike the composer, he lived openly with his lover, Nikolay Vasilyevich Masalitinov (-1884).
- Boris Dmitrievich Golitsyn (1819–1878) was the son of Dmitry Golitsyn. He inherited Bolshiye Vyazyomy in 1844. He was the father of Dmitry B. Golitsyn (1851–1920), who was the last owner.
- Nikolai D. Golitsyn (1850–1925) was the last Tsarist prime minister of Russia. He was the son of Dmitry B. Golitsyn (1803–1864) and governor of Archangel, Kaluga, and Tver. He was executed on 2 July 1925 in Leningrad on the charge of participating in a "counter-revolutionary monarchist organization"
- Prince Grigory S. Golitsyn (1838–1907) was a general and the governor of Transcaucasia in 1897–1904. His brother was
- Lev Golitsyn Sergeyevich (1845–1915) was one of the founders of winemaking at Yusupov Palace (Crimea). In his estate of Novyi Svet he built the first Russian factory of champagne wines. In 1889 the production of this winery won the gold medal at the Paris exhibition in the nomination for sparkling wines. He became the surveyor of imperial vineyards at Abrau-Dyurso in 1891.
- Anna Nikolaevna Golitsyna (1859–1929) married Mikhail Rodzianko, chairman of the Imperial Duma. She, Zinaida Yusupova, and Elizabeth Feodorovna secretly supported Felix Yusupov, Grand Duke Dmitry Pavlovich of Russia and Vladimir Purishkevich in the murder of Grigory Rasputin. Rodzianko became one of the key politicians during the Russian February Revolution.
- Boris Borisovich Golitsyn (1862–1916) was a prominent physicist who invented the first electromagnetic seismograph in 1906. His grandfather was Nikolai Borisovich Galitzin.

== 20th century ==
The Bolsheviks arrested dozens of Golitsyns only to be killed, driven into the exile, or die in the Gulag; dozens disappeared during the Russian Revolution and the subsequent civil war, and their fate remained unknown.

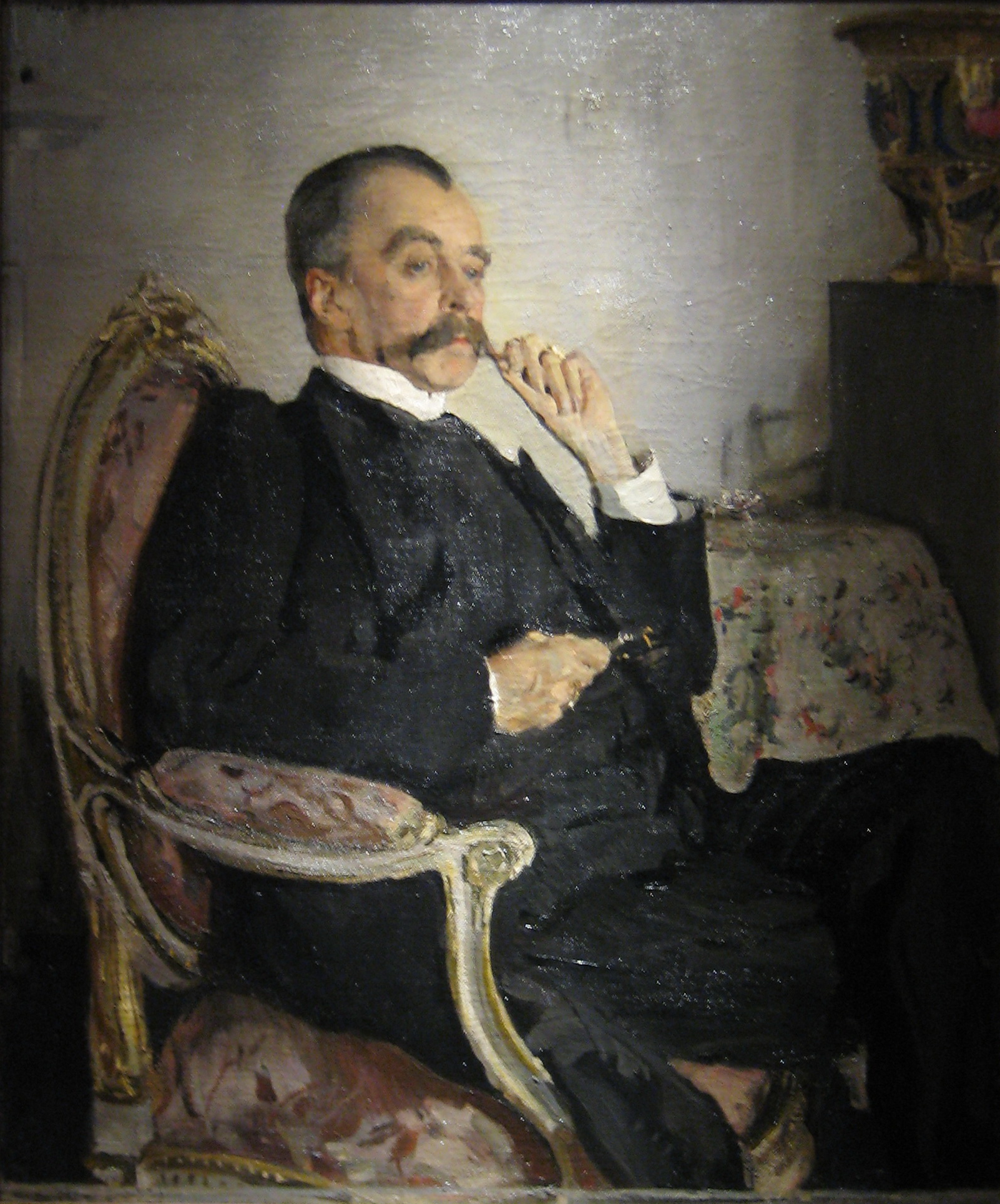
Vladimir Mikhailovich Golitsyn resigned in 1905 as mayor of Moscow; painting by Valentin Serov (Tretyakov gallery)

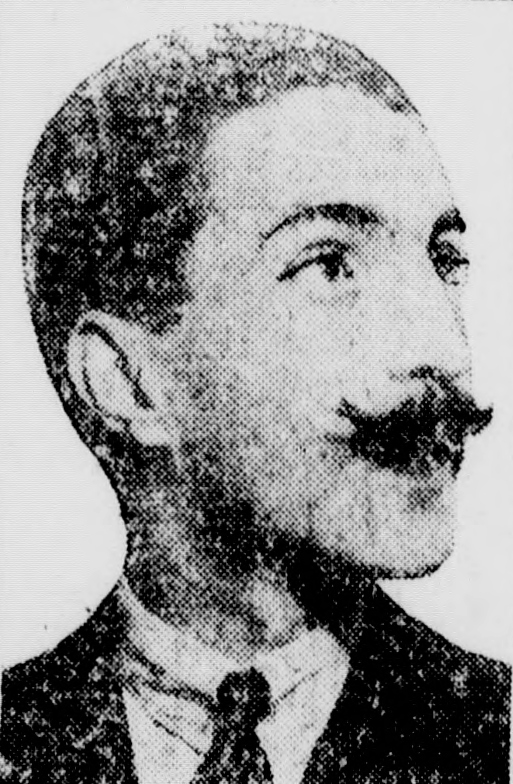
Prince Galatzine (Galitzine), 5th husband of Aimée Crocker

- Mikhail Vladimirovich Golitsyn (1873–1942) was the son of Vladimir Mikhailovich Golitsyn (Paris, 1847–1932) and grandson of Mikhail Fedorovich Golitsyn (1800–1873); Nikolai V. Golitsyn (1874–1942) was his brother
  - Vladimir Mikhailovich Golitsyn (1902–1943) started his career as a sailor. During the 1920s Vladimir began a very successful career as a book illustrator and well-known artist, illustrating around forty books between 1925 and 1941. He also worked for the magazines the Universal Pathfinder, Pioneer and several others. Despite his very popular artwork, he was barely tolerated by the Stalinist bureaucracy and as general conditions worsened, found it increasingly hard to support his parents and young family. Vladimir died from exhaustion and undernourishment in the Sviyazhska prison camp near Kazan.
    - Alexander Vladimirovich Golitsyn (1876–1951). His son was Prince Alexander Golitzen (1908–2005) a Moscow-born production designer and oversaw art direction on more than 300 movies; he died in San Diego, California.
  - Sergei Mikhailovich Golitsyn (1909–1989) published his Memoirs of a Survivor: The Golitsyn Family in Stalin's Russia, covering the period from the revolution in 1917 to the entry of the Soviet Union into World War II in 1941.
    - Georgy Sergeyevich Golitsyn (1935–) was a Russian physicist noted for his research on the concept of nuclear winter.
- Mstislav Galitzine, count Osterman (1899–1966) joined Alexander Kolchak after the October Revolution. In 1925 he married the California mystic, author and heiress Aimee Crocker. She was 61 and it was her fifth marriage. She offered him $250 a month if he would marry her in exchange for the right to call herself a princess. Two years later they divorced. He was forced to pay all the court costs of the suit. His brother was
- Leo Alexandrovich Galitzine, count Osterman (1905–1969) escaped from Soviet Russia and came to settle in Canada by 1929 in Edson, Alberta. He and his wife, Marguerite Therese Reynaud-Carcasse, purchased 420 acres of land, mostly bordering the McLeod River. The Galitzines started an airplane charter company at Great Bear Lake. After his wife died (in Alexandria in 1934), Leo moved to Hollywood, where he was acting in various films as an extra, including in The Razor's Edge and The Chocolate Soldier.
- Princess Irene Galitzine (1916–2006), fashion designer, was the daughter of Boris Lvovich Galizin (1878–1958)

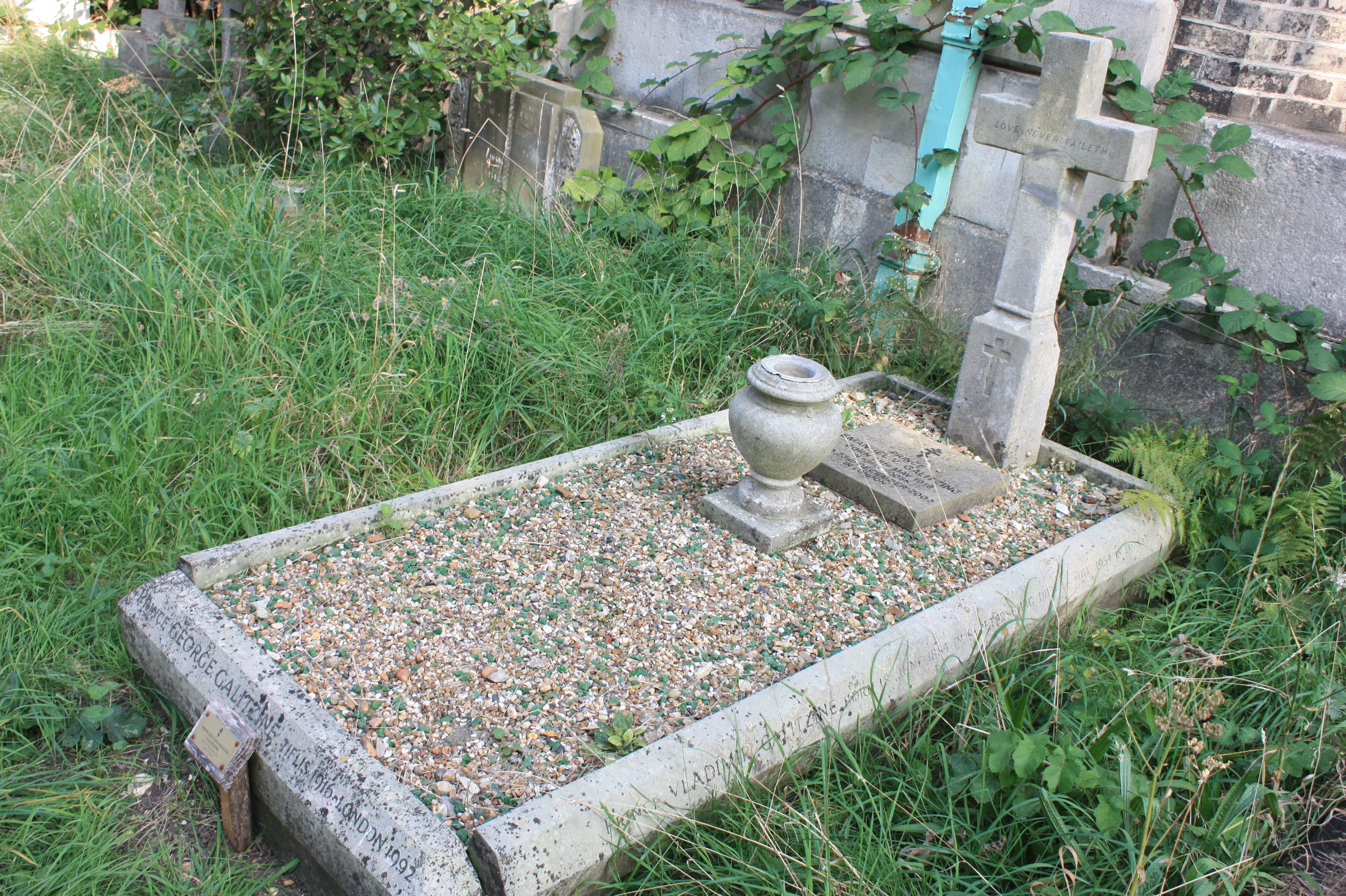
The graves of Princes George and Emanuel Galitzine, Brompton Cemetery, London

- Prince George Vladimirovich Galitzine (1916–1992) served with distinction in the rank of major, Welsh Guards 1939–45. He was subsequently a diplomat and businessman. Following retirement he was active as a researcher, author and lecturer on Russia. In his memory The Prince George Galitzine Memorial Library was founded in 1994 by his widow, Princess George Galitzine (formerly Jean Dawnay), and his daughter Princess Catherine (Katya) Galitzine. The library specialises in the cultural life of St Petersburg with a collection in excess of 3000 books, photographs and documents for research tracing back to Catherine the Great. The library occupies the palace on the Fontanka Embankment, formerly the family home of his mother Countess Catherine von Carlow, daughter of Duke Georg Alexander of Mecklenburg-Strelitz, a younger son of Grand Duchess Catherine Mikhailovna of Russia. Through the Mecklenburg-Strelitz connection, this branch of the Galitzine family are related to many of the Royal Houses of Europe.
- George Golitzin (1916–1963) was a Hollywood producer and deacon in the Orthodox Church in America.
- Yuri Golitsyn (1919–2002), was born in Yokohama, and was one of the founders of public relations, having written the handbook on the subject and pushed research on the family forward to being published in a book. He was also a member of The Right Society and yet championed action against concentration camps after being the first allied officer to witness one firsthand (Natzweiler)
- Anatoliy Golitsyn Mikhaylovich (1926–2008) was a Soviet defector to the United States
- Vladimir Kirillovich Galitzine (1942–2018), Russian-Serbian-American banker with Bank of New York who led the re-introduction of banks in the former Warsaw Pact countries including the newly formed states from the former Soviet Union.
- Archbishop Alexander Golitzin (1948–) is Archbishop for Dallas, the South and the Bulgarian Diocese for the Orthodox Church in America. He is also emeritus professor of theology at Marquette University in Milwaukee, Wisconsin. His academic work focuses on the discerning the roots of eastern Christian spirituality in Second Temple Judaism.
- Piotr Dmitriyevich Galitzine (1955–) was the son of Dmitry Vladimirovich Golitsyn (1914–1976). He married Maria-Anna von Habsburg, better known as Maria-Anna Galitzine, a Catholic activist
  - Tatiana Galitzine (1984–) is an American architect.
  - Maria Galitzine (1988–2020) was a Russian-American interior designer.
- Grigori Galitsin (1957–2021) was a former erotic photographer.

== Bibliography ==
- Sjöström (2011). "Liettuan gediminidien suomensukuiset geneettiset juuret". Donelaitis: Donelaitis-seuran, Liettuan Ystävät ry:n lehti. No. 1. pp. 16–18. ISSN 1239-3487.
- Chisholm, Hugh, ed. (1911). "Gallitzin, Demetrius Augustine" . Encyclopædia Britannica. Vol. 11 (11th ed.). Cambridge University Press. p. 421.
- Golitsyn, Sergei (1909–1989): Memoirs of a Survivor: The Golitsyn Family in Stalin's Russia, 2008
- Le Donne John P. (1987) Ruling families in the Russian political order, 1689–1825 : I. The Petrine leadership, 1689–1725; II. The ruling families, 1725–1825. In: Cahiers du monde russe et soviétique, vol. 28, n°3-4, Juillet-Décembre 1987. pp. 233–322. doi:10.3406/cmr.1987.2115
- Douglas Smith: Former People: The Final Days of the Russian Aristocracy. Farrar, Straus and Giroux, 2012 ISBN 9780374157616
- Plakans, Andrejs (2011). A Concise History of the Baltic States. Cambridge University Press. ISBN 978-0-521-54155-8.
- Christiansen, Eric (1980). The northern crusades: the Baltic and the Catholic frontier, 1100-1525. Macmillan. p. 273. ISBN 0-333-26243-3.
