= Pyotr Alexeyevich Golitsyn =

Russian prince

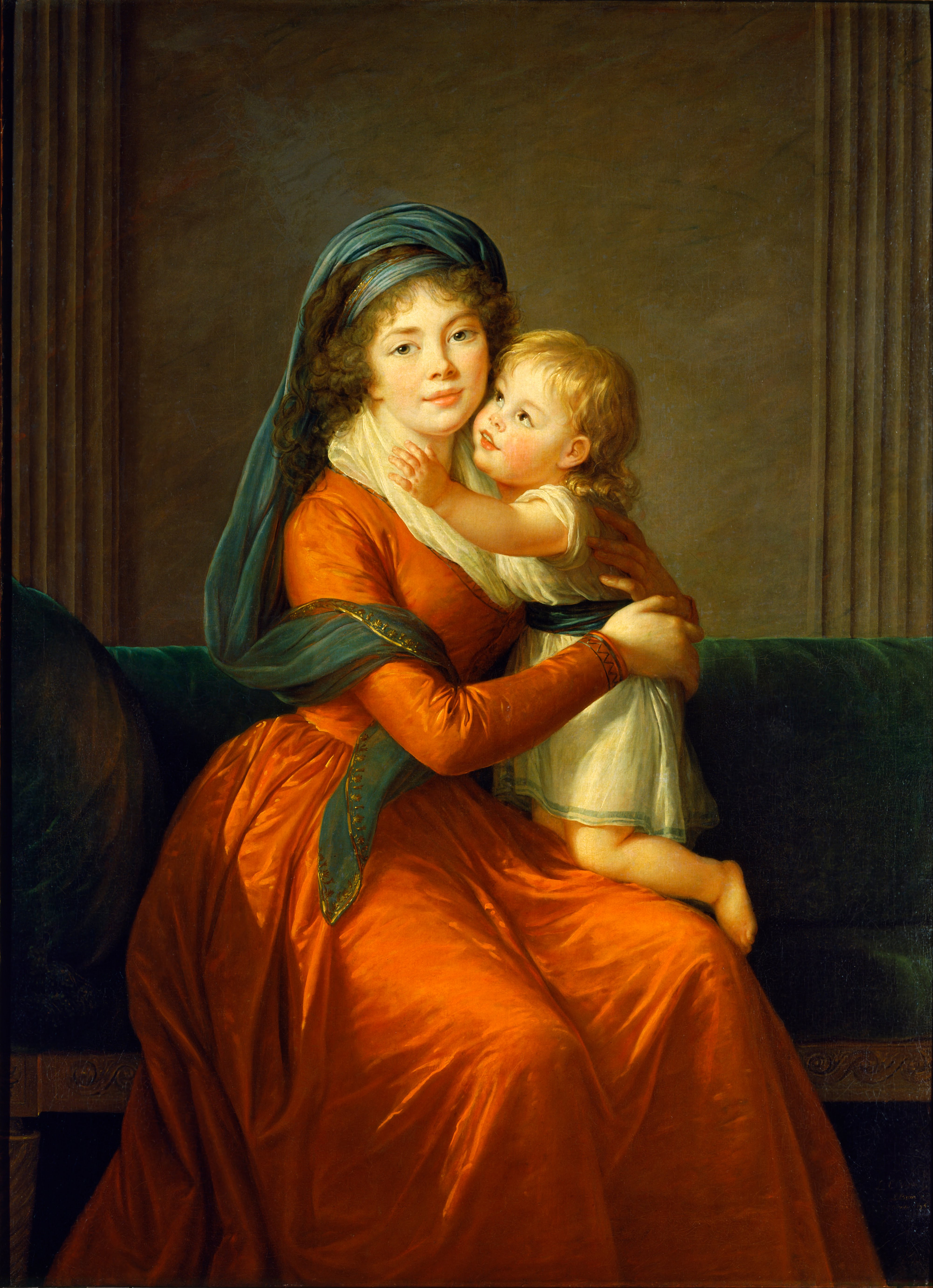
Portrait of his Pyotr and his mother, Alexandra, by Élisabeth Vigée Le Brun, 1794.

Prince Pyotr Alexeyevich Golitsyn (22 January 1792 – 16 October 1842) was a Russian prince, a member of the Patriotic War and foreign campaigns, and a Catholic convert from Russian Orthodoxy.

== Early life ==
Prince Golitsyn was born on 22 January 1792 in Moscow, Russian Empire. He was the eldest son of Prince Alexei Andreevich Golitsyn (1767–1800), master of the horse, and historian Alexandra Petrovna Golitsyna (1774–1842). Among his siblings were Yelizaveta Golitsyna, who became a nun.

His maternal grandparents were Senator and Lt.-Gen. Pyotr Stepanovich Protasov, and Anna Ivanovna. His mother and her sister, including writer Catherine Rostopchin and Vera Vasilchikova, were raised by their aunt, Countess Anna Protasova, a personal friend of the Empress Catherine II.

== Career ==
In 1820, under the influence of his wife and her mother, he converted from Russian Orthodoxy to Catholicism (his mother had officially converted to Catholicism in May 1818). In 1837, his wife with their children (three sons and one daughter) had moved abroad, the prince bought land in Paris, France, where he settled with his family. He retired as a captain in 1838 from the Patriotic Wars against Napoleon and a Bogorodsky District Marshal of Nobility.

== Personal life ==
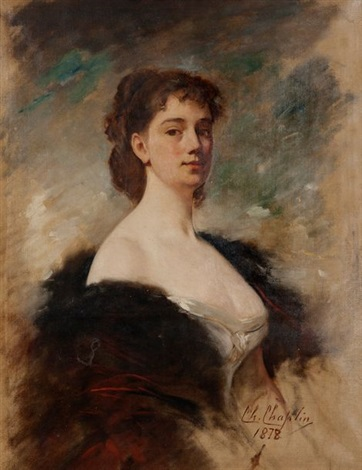
Portrait of his granddaughter, Princess Sophie Galitzine, by Charles Joshua Chaplin, 1878

In 1817, Prince Golitsyn married Elżbieta Antonovna Zlotnitskoy (1800–1866), a Polish girl who was in love with a famous poet Denis Davydov, in Kiev. Together, they were the parents of:

- Anton Pavlovich Golitsyn (1818–1883), who married Adélaïde Marie Angèle de Molette de Morangiès in Paris in 1843.
- Mariya Petrovna Golitsyn (1820–1890), who married Count Ferdinand Louise Marie de Bertier de Sauvigny at the Château de Frémigny in 1840.
- Augustin Petrovich Golitsyn (1823–1875), who married Stéphanie de la Roche Aymon, a daughter of Antoine de La Roche-Aymon, Marquis de La Roche-Aymon and Marie Louise Vallet de Villeneuve (who owned the Château de Châtain in Arfeuille-Châtain), in Chenonceaux in 1844.
- Pyotr Petrovich Golitsyn (1827–1902), who married Yuliya Aleksandrovna Chertkova in St. Petersburg in 1850. After her death in 1864, he married Natalia Alexandrovna Kozakov in 1871.
- Aleksandra Petrovna Golitsyn (1830–1917), who married Polish nobleman, Count Arsen Antoni Ludwik Moszczeński.

Prince Golitsyn died in Paris on 16 October 1842. His widow died in Blamont, in the Doubs department in the Bourgogne-Franche-Comté region in eastern France, in December 1866.

=== Descendants ===
Through his son Augustin, he was a grandfather of Princess Sophie Galitzine (1858–1883), who married the French aristocrat Paul d'Albert de Luynes, Duke of Chaulnes and Picquigny. They were the parents of Marie Thérèse d'Albert de Luynes (who married Louis de Crussol d'Uzès, 14th Duke of Uzès in 1894) and Emmanuel d'Albert de Luynes, 11th Duke of Chaulnes and Picquigny (who married American heiress Theodora Mary Shonts in 1908).
