= Bertier =

Bertier may refer to:

== People ==
- Antoine Bertier (1761–1854), French landowner and politician
- Charles Bertier (1860–1924), French landscape painter.
- Charles Bertier (journalist) (1821–1882), Governor of Martinique from 1867 to 1869
- Georges Bertier (1877–1962), French educator
- Gerry Bertier (1953–1981), Virginia high school American football player
- Michel Bertier (1695–1740), surgeon-major of Quebec, Canada

== See also ==
- De Bertier de Sauvigny, aristocratic French surname.
