= Alexandra Petrovna Golitsyna =

Maid of honour and historian (1774–1842)

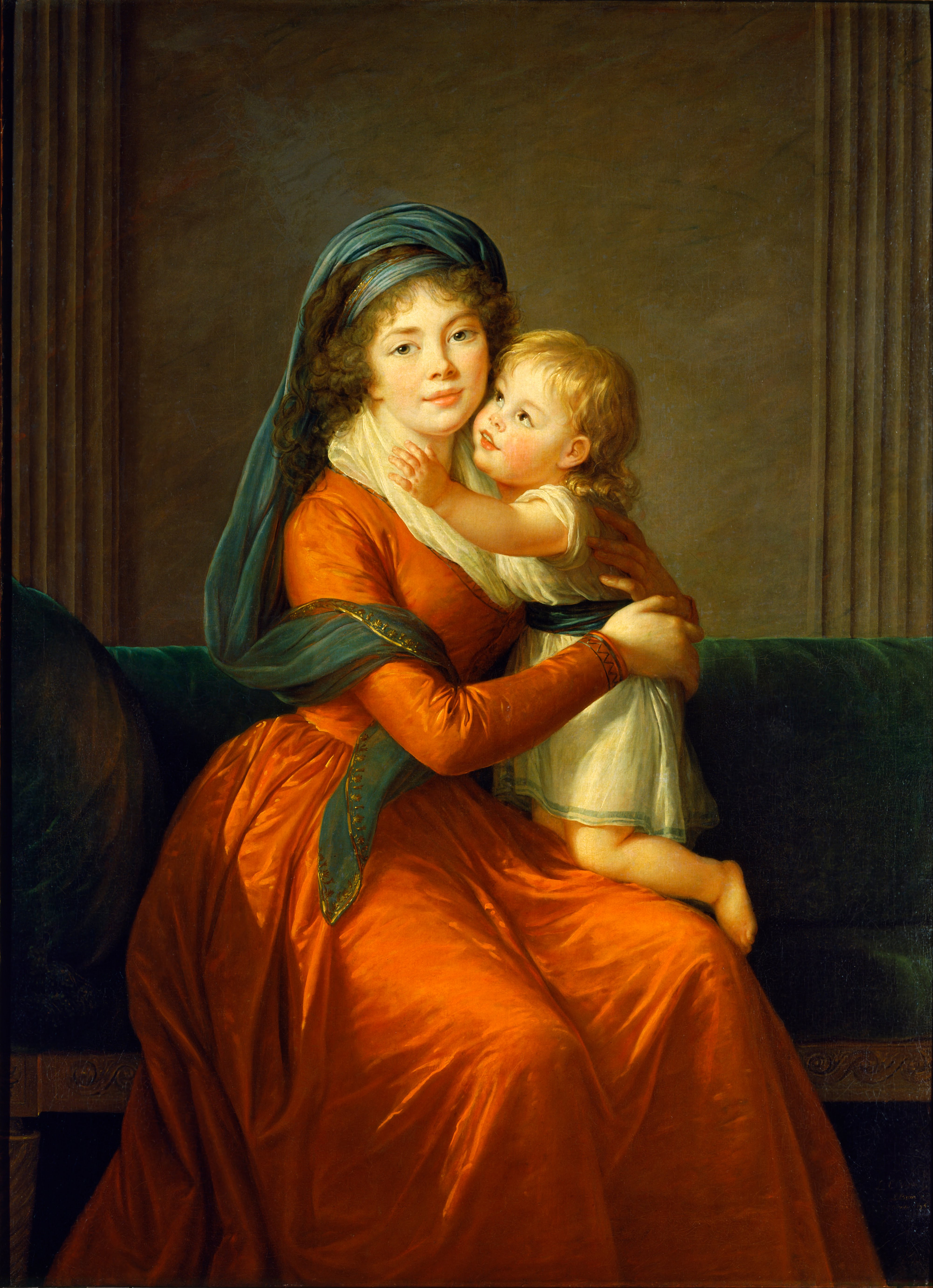

Princess Alexandra Petrovna Golitsyna (Russian: Александра Петровна Голицына, née Протасова) (1774–1842) was a maid of honour and historian of the Russian noble Protasov family. Sister to Moscow aristocrat and writer Catherine Rostopchin and maid of honour and dame of the Order of Saint Catherine Vera Vasilchikova, she was the mother of five, including Peter Gallitzin. The Roman Catholic missionary, Demetrius Augustine Gallitzin published her writing posthumously.

== Early life and family ==
Alexandra was the daughter of a senator, Lieutenant-General Pyotr Stepanovich Protasov (1730–1794), and his wife Anna Ivanovna (1750–1782). She and her four sisters were orphaned early in life and were raised by their aunt, Anna Protasov, a chambermaid of some note, and a personal friend of the Empress Catherine II, who was under the care of Madame de Pont. Protasov gave her nieces a great education by the standards of the time: the studies focused on foreign languages, including Latin, Greek, and Russian. They were also taught Russian history and religion. At the request of their aunt, the sisters, one still unmarried at the time of the Coronation of Alexander I of Russia, each received the title of Countess.

Alexandra's four sisters who were orphaned with her:

- Catherine Rostopchin (1776–1859), aristocrat and writer, who married Moscow Governor-General Fyodor Rostopchin.
- Varvara Petrovna, unmarried at the time of her death.
- Vera Vasilchikova (1780–1814), maid of honour and dame of the Order of Saint Catherine who was the first wife of later-Prince Hilarion Vasilyevich Vasilchikov.
- Anna Petrovna, married Count Bartholomew Vasilyevich Tolstoy.

== Marriage, conversion, and children ==
Alexandra's station in life was elevated to the maid of honour, and in 1791 married the master of the horse, a confidential councilor to Prince Alexei Andreevich Golitsyn (1767–1800). Their union was relatively short but produced five children. Nine years into the marriage Alexandra was widowed.

The countess officially converted to Catholicism from Russian Orthodoxy on 14 May 1818. Her conversion influenced her surviving daughter Yelizaveta, who became a nun, and two of her sons, who became missionaries. Alexandra also influenced a few others from the Russian nobility to convert to Catholicism. Golitsyna censured Madame Swetchine, who was known to be a mystic, only for the fact that she lived abroad, due to Golitsyna's belief that true religion was to serve at home in Russia.

The countess' two daughters and four sons:

- In 1820, her eldest son Peter Gallitzin (1792–1842) converted to Catholicism. He retired as a captain in 1838 from the Patriotic Wars and a Bogorodsky district marshal of nobility, and died in Paris in 1842. He was married to Yelizaveta Antonovna Zlotnitsky (1800–1866).
- Vera (? - died in childhood)
- Pavel (1796–1864), a mason, titular councilor and bedchamber man, died in Vienna in 1825, he was married to Countess Natalia Nikolaevna Zotova (1807–1873).
- Yelizaveta (1797–1844), at the insistence of her mother in 1826, adopted Catholicism and became a nun in Metz, and a writer, dying in the Catholic mission of Saint Michael in Convent, Louisiana, US.
- Alexander (1798–1876), lieutenant-captain of the Cavalry Regiment, district marshal of the nobility in the Smolensk region, died single in Moscow.
- Alexey (1800–1876), a mason, converted to Catholicism, in 1870 became a Smolensk marshal, was married to Countess Alexandra Pavlovna Kutaisova (1803–1881), daughter of Count Pavel I. Kutaisov.

== Work with Ivan Kozlov ==
In the 1830s, under the patronage of a Princess, Alexandra looked after the blind poet Ivan Kozlov, who often mentioned her in his diary, with great tenderness. A few days before his death on 18 January 1840 he wrote: "This holy woman with her strict positivity diminished the sweetness of Christian charity, but she will always have a holy influence on my soul, and I love and admire her enormously." The poet died on September 11, 1840, at the age of 60 in his home in St. Petersburg, was buried in Paris, at Montmartre Cemetery.

== Work published posthumously ==
After the death of the princess, some of remaining manuscripts were published. Excerpts from her written prayers and thoughts were published by her grandson Demetrius Augustine Gallitzin in his book Vie d'une religieuse du Sacre-coeur. Her correspondence with Madame Swetchine and Russian Catholics are contained in the book Lettres de Madame de Swetchine (Paris, 1862).

== Bibliography ==
- Russian portraits of XVIII-XIX centuries. Ed. Grand Prince Nikolai Mikhailovich. St. Petersburg. 1906. T. I Vol III. № 73.
- Russian Biographical Dictionary: The 25 t / A. A. Polovtsov. - M., 1896-1918. Volume 7, p. 204
