= Bulgakovo =

Bulgakovo (Russian: Булгаково) is the name of several rural localities in Russia.

== Modern localities ==
=== Republic of Bashkortostan ===
As of 2014, one rural locality in the Republic of Bashkortostan bears this name:

Republic of Bashkortostan location map
Location of Bulgakovo in the Republic of Bashkortostan
- Bulgakovo, Republic of Bashkortostan, a selo in Bulgakovsky Selsoviet of Ufimsky District; 54°29′N 55°54′E

=== Ivanovo Oblast ===
As of 2014, one rural locality in Ivanovo Oblast bears this name:

Ivanovo Oblast location map
Location of Bulgakovo in Ivanovo Oblast
- Bulgakovo, Ivanovo Oblast, a village in Teykovsky District; 56°33′N 40°25′E

=== Republic of Mordovia ===
As of 2014, one rural locality in the Republic of Mordovia bears this name:

Republic of Mordovia location map
Location of Bulgakovo in the Republic of Mordovia
- Bulgakovo, Republic of Mordovia, a selo in Bulgakovsky Selsoviet of Kochkurovsky District; 54°03′N 45°15′E

=== Moscow Oblast ===
As of 2014, four rural localities in Moscow Oblast bear this name:

Moscow Oblast distribution map
Distribution of the inhabited localities called Bulgakovo in Moscow Oblast.
- Bulgakovo, Chekhovsky District, Moscow Oblast, a village in Stremilovskoye Rural Settlement of Chekhovsky District; 55°05′N 37°07′E
- Bulgakovo, Lukhovitsky District, Moscow Oblast, a village in Astapovskoye Rural Settlement of Lukhovitsky District; 54°56′N 38°51′E
- Bulgakovo, Noginsky District, Moscow Oblast, a village under the administrative jurisdiction of the Town of Elektrougli in Noginsky District; 55°44′N 38°16′E
- Bulgakovo, Ramensky District, Moscow Oblast, a village in Ulyaninskoye Rural Settlement of Ramensky District; 55°15′N 38°25′E

=== Orenburg Oblast ===
As of 2014, two rural localities in Orenburg Oblast bear this name:

- Bulgakovo, Buzuluksky District, Orenburg Oblast, a selo in Krasnoslobodsky Selsoviet of Buzuluksky District
- Bulgakovo, Saraktashsky District, Orenburg Oblast, a village in Gavrilovsky Selsoviet of Saraktashsky District

=== Oryol Oblast ===
As of 2014, two rural localities in Oryol Oblast bear this name:

Oryol Oblast distribution map
Distribution of the inhabited localities called Bulgakovo in Oryol Oblast.
- Bulgakovo, Orlovsky District, Oryol Oblast, a village in Spassky Selsoviet of Orlovsky District; 53°07′N 35°57′E
- Bulgakovo, Znamensky District, Oryol Oblast, a village in Krasnikovsky Selsoviet of Znamensky District; 53°24′N 35°44′E

=== Ryazan Oblast ===
As of 2014, one rural locality in Ryazan Oblast bears this name:

- Bulgakovo, Ryazan Oblast, a village in Bulgakovsky Rural Okrug of Kasimovsky District

=== Smolensk Oblast ===
As of 2014, two rural localities in Smolensk Oblast bear this name:

- Bulgakovo, Dukhovshchinsky District, Smolensk Oblast, a village in Bulgakovskoye Rural Settlement of Dukhovshchinsky District
- Bulgakovo, Tyomkinsky District, Smolensk Oblast, a village in Pavlovskoye Rural Settlement of Tyomkinsky District

=== Tambov Oblast ===
As of 2014, two rural localities in Tambov Oblast bear this name:

- Bulgakovo, Gavrilovsky District, Tambov Oblast, a selo in Bulgakovsky Selsoviet of Gavrilovsky District
- Bulgakovo, Zherdevsky District, Tambov Oblast, a village in Shpikulovsky Selsoviet of Zherdevsky District

== See also ==
- Bulgakov
