= Bulgakov =

Bulgakov (Russian: Булгаков) is a Russian surname. Notable people with the surname include:

- Anatoly Bulgakov (footballer, born 1944), Russian football coach and former midfielder/striker
- Anatoly Bulgakov (footballer, born 1979), Russian football defender
- Anna Bulgakova (born 1988), Russian hammer thrower
- Alexander Bulgakov (1781–1863), Russian diplomat, senator, and postal administrator; son of Yakov
- Dmitry Bulgakov (born 1954), Russian economist and military leader
- Genrikh Bulgakov (1929–2010), Soviet fencer
- Konstantin Bulgakov (1782–1835), Russian diplomat, privy councillor, and postal administrator; son of Yakov
- Maya Bulgakova (1932–1994), Soviet and Russian actress
- Mikhail Bulgakov (1891–1940), Russian novelist and playwright, most notably of The Master and Margarita
- Macarius Bulgakov (1816–1882), bishop known as Metropolitan Macarius of Moscow and Kolomna
- Nadezhda M. Bulgakova, Russian professor of Physics and Chemistry.
- Nikolai Bulgakov (1960–2023), Russian professional football coach and a former player
- Sergei Bulgakov (1871–1944), Christian theologian, philosopher and economist
- Valentin Bulgakov (1886–1966), Russian memorialist and biographer of Leo Tolstoy
- Vladimir Bulgakov (born 1949), Russian military officer
- Yakov Bulgakov (1743–1809), Russian diplomat; father of Alexander and Konstantin
- Yuri Bulgakov, 16th-century Russian governor and diplomat
- Zoya Bulgakova (1914–2017), Russian Soviet stage actress

== See also ==
- Gediminids, a dynasty including the Bulgakov family
- Bulgakovo, the name of several rural localities in Russia
- 3469 Bulgakov, an asteroid named after Mikhail Bulgakov
