= Bulgak =

Bulgak (Russian: Булгак) is a Russian surname. Notable people with the surname include:

- Adut Bulgak (born 1992), South Sudanese-Canadian basketball player
- Vladimir Bulgak (born 1941), Russian engineer, bureaucrat, and politician

== See also ==
- Bulgakov
