= Château de La Grange =

Historic château in Moselle, France

Coordinates: 49.3766°N 6.1671°E

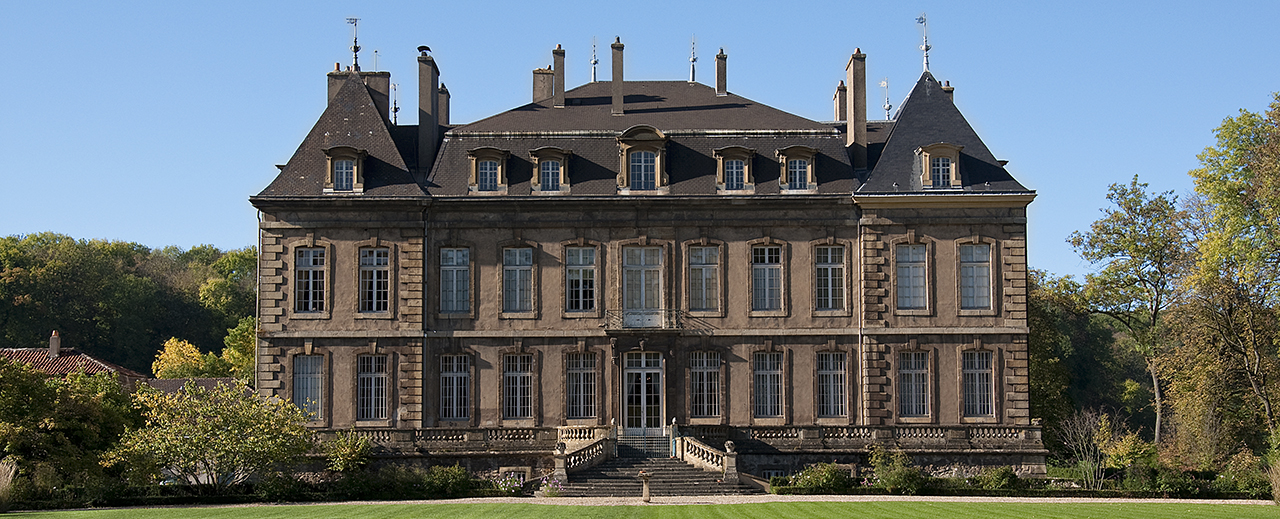
The Château de La Grange in 2010.

The Château de La Grange is an historic château in Manom, Moselle, France. It was built in the 17th century. It belonged to Jean de Bertier de Sauvigny after World War I. It has been listed as an official historical monument since February 28, 1984.
