= De Bertier de Sauvigny =

de Bertier de Sauvigny is an aristocratic French surname. People with that surname include:

- Ferdinand de Bertier de Sauvigny (1782–1864), French politician.
- Guillaume de Bertier de Sauvigny (1912–2004), French historian.
- Jean de Bertier de Sauvigny (1877–1926), French politician.
