= Vera Vasilchikova =

Russian maid of honor

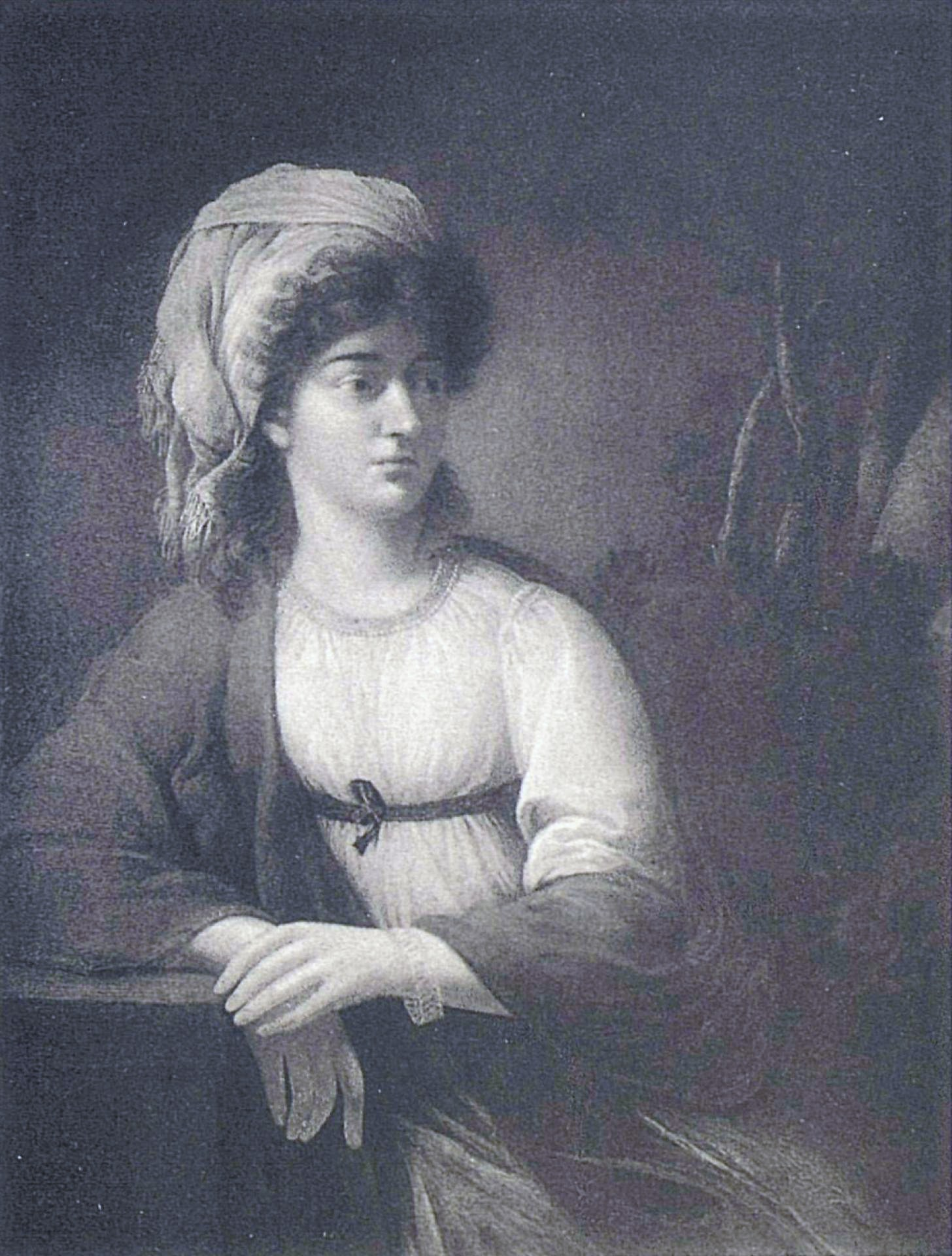
Portrait by Élisabeth Vigée Le Brun

Vera Vasilchikova (née Protasova, 1780 – 2 October 1814) was a maid of honour, the first wife of General Hilarion Vasilyevich Vasilchikov and dame of the Order of Saint Catherine (1814).

== Biography ==
Vera Vasilchikova was one of the daughters of the senator and governor of the Kaluga Peter S. Protasov (1730–1791) and his wife, Alexandra Ivanovna, née Protassova (1750–1782). In early childhood, she lost her parents and she and her sisters, Alexandra, Catherine, Barbara, and Anne were brought up under the auspices of their aunt Anna Stepanovna, which was the favourite lady-in-wairing of Catherine II. She gave her nieces brilliant concepts for the then education, and the focus was drawn to foreign languages, including Latin and Greek at the expense of Russian, which they did not teach, as well as national history and religion. Barbara, Vera and Anna lived with her in the palace and were appointed maids of honour. On 15 September 1801 Anna Stepanovna Protasova was "elevated to the dignity of Countess of the Russian Empire," but after two days' condescending to request of Countess Anna Protassova, the comital dignity was graciously extended to her nieces, daughter of the late Lieutenant-General Peter Protasov.

In 1801, Vera Petrovna became the first wife of General Hilarion Vasilchikov (1776–1847), son of Vasilii Alekseevich and Catherine Illarionovna, née Ovtsyna. Despite the fact that the marriage was not happy, the couple had two children:

- Hilarion (1805–1862), Adjutant General, Kyiv, Volyn and Podolsk Governor General, a member of the Council of State.
- Catherine (died 1842), the wife of the Kursk and Kharkov Governor Lieutenant-General I. D. Luzhin.

Together with her sisters Alexandra Galitzine, Countess Catherine Rostopchina and Barbara Protassova she adopted Catholicism, converted themselves from Russian Orthodoxy.

On 30 August 1814 she was granted the small cross of the Order of St. Catherine. In the same year, she became terminally ill and she her husband traveled abroad.

Vera Vasilchikova died on 2 October 1814 and was buried in the churchyard of the Holy Spirit church in Strupino, Novgorod district.
