= Yelizaveta Golitsyna =

Russian noble and Catholic nun

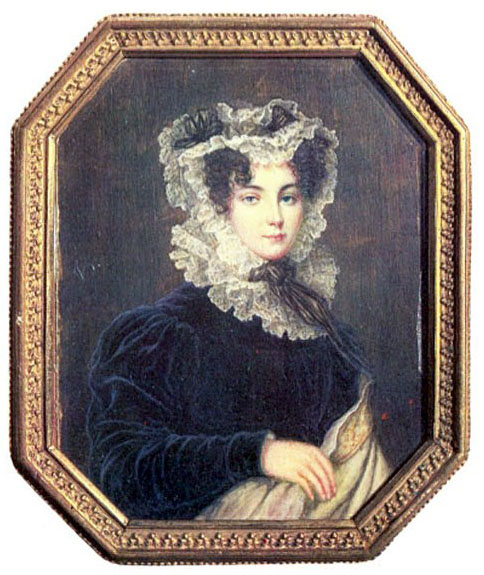
- Born: 22 February 1797; Saint Petersburg, Russian Empire
- Died: 26 November 1844 (aged 47); Louisiana, United States of America
- Noble family: House of Golitsyn
- Father: Prince Alexei Andreevich Golitsyn
- Mother: Princess Alexandra Petrovna Protasova

Sister Yelizaveta Alexeyevna Golitsyna (also Elizabeth Gallitzin) (22 February 1797 in Saint Petersburg, Russian Empire – 26 November 1844 in Louisiana, United States of America) was a Russian noble and Catholic nun, who converted from Russian Orthodoxy.

== Biography ==
Yelizaveta Golitsyna was born 22 February 1797 in Saint Petersburg, Russia to the family of Prince Alexei Andreevich Golitsyn and Princess Alexandra Golitsyna. She was baptized and brought up in the Russian Orthodox Church.

When she was 15, she learned that her mother and her aunt converted to Catholicism (the aunt, a revert to the faith, was the mother of future Catholic priest Demetrius Gallitzin). Outraged by this "betrayal," Golitsyna vowed never to change her religion, but over the next four years, her rejection of Catholicism was replaced by interest and desire to know more. Eventually, Yelizaveta also joined the Catholic Church.

During one of her trips abroad, Golitsyna met Jesuit Father Rozaven, whom she asked to find for her a religious order devoted to education. Father Rozaven suggested the recently founded community, the "Society of the Sacred Heart of Jesus", created by Madeleine Sophie Barat in order to spread education among Catholic women. Golitsyna took the veil in the city of Metz in 1826, and made her first vows in Rome in 1828. Her final vows were taken in Paris in 1832.

Mother Barat highly valued the assistance of Golitsyna. After the General Council in 1839, Golitsyna was appointed Assistant General and sent to visit the American houses. She arrived in New York and promised Bishop Hughes that the Society of the Sacred Heart would open a house in New York. In May 1841, the first Religious arrived. A school was opened at the corner of Houston and Mulberry streets, in Manhattan, then in Astoria, and finally at Manhattanville. During her stay in New York, Mother Gallitzin was a guest of the Parmentier family, noted New York philanthropists, at their Bridge Street mansion in Brooklyn. In 1842 Mme. Gallitzin founded establishments in the Pottawattamie missions, and at McSherrystown, Maryland.

Mother Elizabeth died of yellow fever, at the age of 47, on 26 November 1844 in New Orleans, Louisiana.
