= Jean de Bertier de Sauvigny =

French politician

- Born: 31 October 1877; Saint-Mihiel, Meuse, France
- Died: 26 September 1926 (aged 48); Volmunster, Moselle, France
- Education: École spéciale militaire de Saint-Cyr; Saumur Cavalry School; École Militaire
- Occupation: Politician
- Spouse: Marie-Louise Chalneton de Croy

Jean de Bertier de Sauvigny (1877–1926) was a French politician. He served as a member of the French Senate from 1922 to 1926, representing Moselle.

== Early life ==
De Bertier de Sauvigny was born on October 31, 1877, in Saint-Mihiel, France. He grew up at the Château de La Grange and the Château des Rosaires.

De Bertier de Sauvigny graduated from the École spéciale militaire de Saint-Cyr, followed by the Saumur Cavalry School and the École Militaire.

== Career ==
De Bertier de Sauvigny joined the French Army as a second lieutenant in 1899. He served in Morocco from 1909 to 1911. He was a military attache at the Embassy of France, Washington, D.C. from 1911 to 1914, until he returned to France to serve in World War I.

De Bertier de Sauvigny was elected as the mayor of Manom in 1919. He served as a member of the French Senate from 1922 to 1926, representing Moselle.

== Personal life and death ==
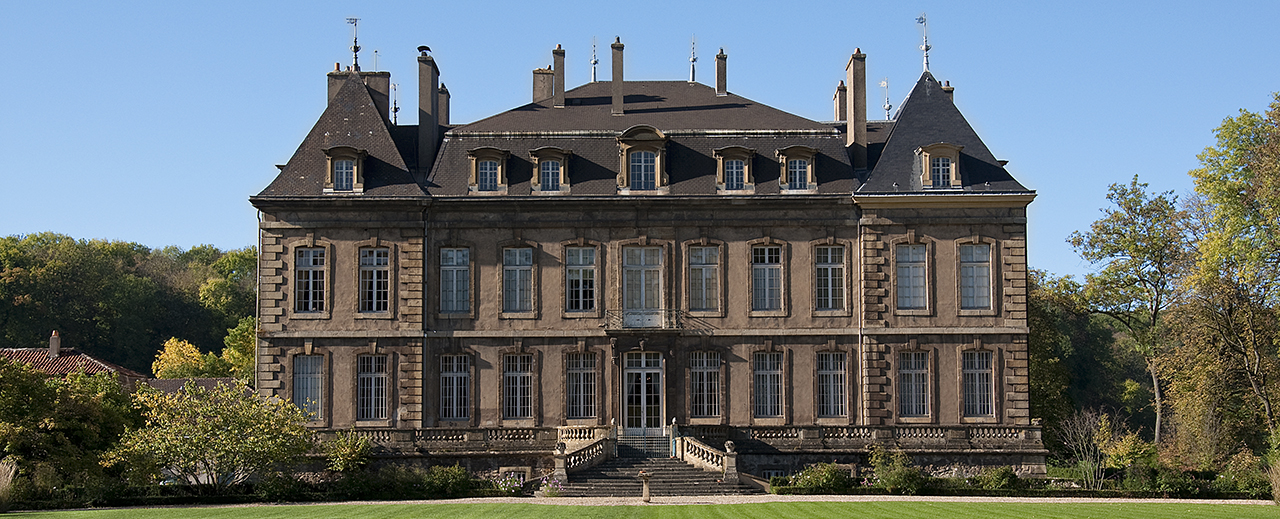
Château de La Grange

De Bertier de Sauvigny married Marie-Louise, Pauline, Huberte Chalneton de Croy in 1908. They resided at the Château de La Grange after World War I. He died on September 26, 1926, in Volmunster, France.
