= Genrikh Bulgakov =

Soviet fencer

Personal information
- Born: 19 January 1929
- Died: 12 March 2010

Sport
- Sport: Fencing

Genrikh Bulgakov (Russian: Генрих Булгаков; 19 January 1929 – 12 March 2010) was a Soviet fencer. He competed in the team épée event at the 1952 Summer Olympics.
