= Nadezhda M. Bulgakova =

Russian physicist specialized in laser–matter interaction

- Education: Novosibirsk State University (NSU)
- Known for: Laser–matter interaction, non-thermal laser processing, nanostructure engineering
- Awards: Marie Curie International Incoming Fellowship (2011–2013); Order Labore et Scientia (2017)
- Scientific career
- Fields: Laser physics, optics, photonics
- Workplaces: HiLASE Centre, Institute of Physics of the Czech Academy of Sciences

Nadezhda M. Bulgakova is a Russian physicist and senior researcher specialized in laser–matter interaction, ultrafast optics, and laser processing of materials. Prof. Bulgakova is based in Prague and affiliated with the Institute of Physics of the Czech Academy of Sciences (FZU) and formerly to the HiLASE Centre. Since 2015, she leads the department of Scientific Laser Applications.

== Career ==
Prof. Bulgakova's research focus is on non-thermal regimes of laser–matter interaction, nanostructure engineering, and precision laser processing. Her team conducts both experimental and theoretical research in laser ablation, energy deposition, and ultrafast materials modification. She has published extensively on topics such as laser annealing of semiconductor nanostructures, ultrashort-pulse processing, and modeling of laser absorption and energy transport in solids.

Between 2011 and 2013, she held a Marie Curie International Incoming Fellowship at the Optoelectronics Research Centre, University of Southampton, United Kingdom. She also held visiting fellowships at the University of Gothenburg (Sweden), Max Born Institute (Germany), Université de la Méditerranée (France), Hubert Curien Laboratory (France), and University of Antwerp (Belgium).

== Honors ==
- Doctor of Science, honoris causa (2020), International Academy of Natural History.
- Order Labore et Scientia (2017), European Scientific and Industrial Consortium (ESIC).
- Golden Medal and Diploma Di Merito (2012), European Scientific-Industrial Chamber.
- Marie Curie International Incoming Fellowship (FP7, 2011–2013), Optoelectronics Research Centre, University of Southampton.
- Fellowship of the Swedish Royal Society (2007), University of Gothenburg.
- Fellowship of the French Ministry of Education (2002), Université de la Méditerranée (Aix–Marseille II).
- Member of Optica (formerly OSA); featured in Optica’s “Faces of Optica” portrait series.
- Member of the Erwin Schrödinger Society (Austria) and long-term expert for EU Framework Programmes (since 2005).

== Selected publications ==
- N. M. Bulgakova and A. Bulgakov (2001). “Dynamics of laser-induced phase transitions and material removal.” Applied Physics A.
- Gnilitskyi, I.; Derrien, T. J.-Y.; Levy, Y.; Bulgakova, N. M.; Mocek, T. & Orazi, L. High-speed manufacturing of highly regular femtosecond laser-induced periodic surface structures: physical origin of regularity. Scientific reports, 7, 8485 (2017).
