= Georges Bertier =

Georges Alphonse Bertier
- Born: Georges Alphonse Bertier; 1877; Nancy, France
- Died: 1962 (aged 84–85); Paris, France
- Occupation: Educationalist

Georges Alphonse Bertier (1877–1962) was a French educator, Director of the École des Roches, and co-founder of secular Scouting in France. Co-founder of Eclaireurs de France, he founded one of the first recorded Boy Scout troops in 1910 at École des Roches (pioneer of Active learning).

He served as President of Eclaireurs de France between 1920 and 1936, and later as President of Eclaireurs Neutres de France from 1952 to his death.

== Honors and Awards ==
Knight of the Ordre des Palmes Académiques
