= Guillaume de Bertier de Sauvigny =

French historian

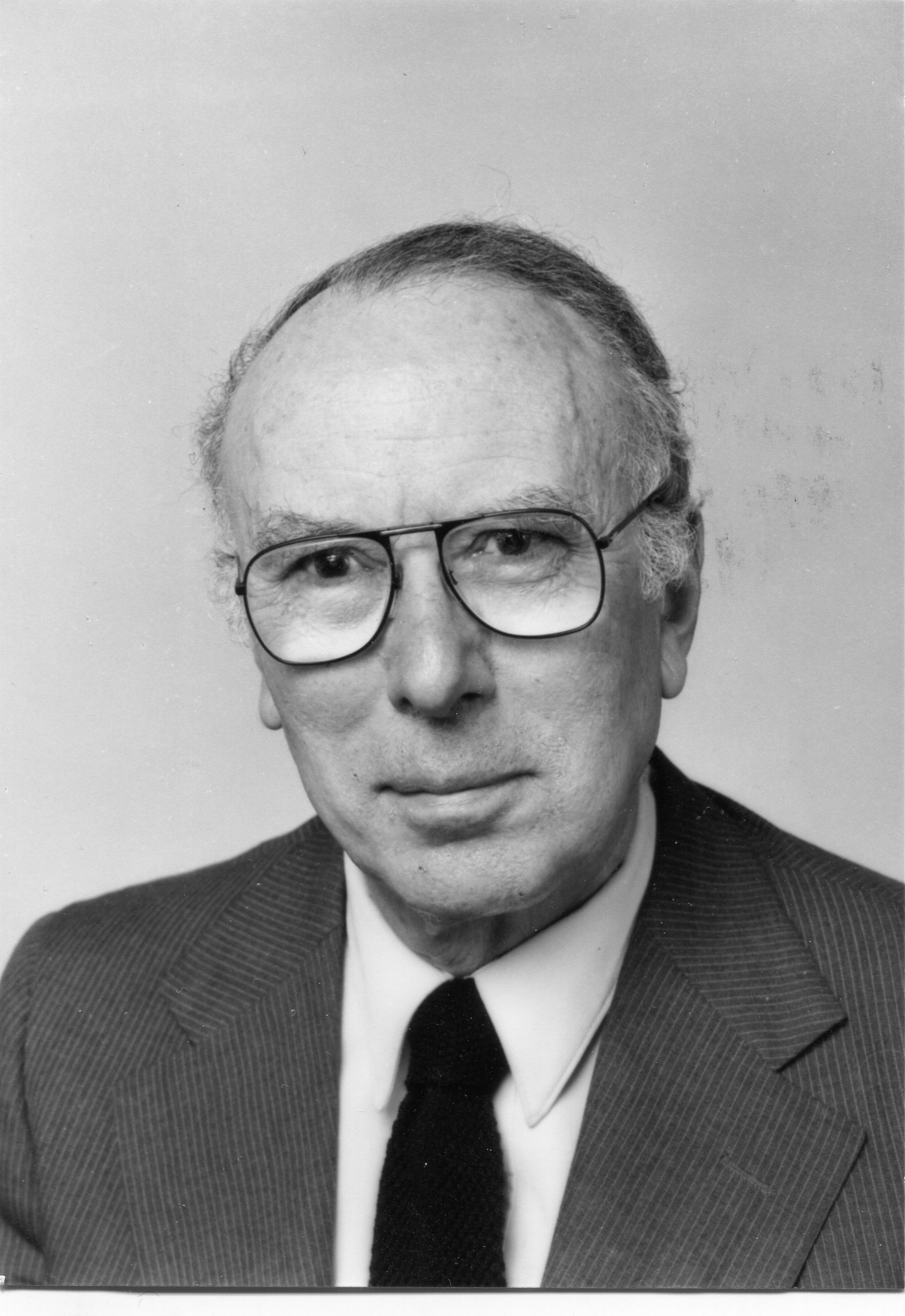
- Guillaume de Bertier de Sauvigny.
- Born: 21 March 1912; Boulogne-sur-Mer, Pas-de-Calais, France
- Died: 7 October 2004 (aged 92); Paris, France
- Occupation: Historian

Guillaume de Bertier de Sauvigny (21 March 1912 – 7 October 2004) was a French historian. He was a professor of Modern and Contemporary History at the Institut Catholique de Paris from 1949 to 1977. He was the recipient of three prizes from the Académie française: the Prix Thiers for Le comte Ferdinand de Bertier et l’énigme de la Congrégation in 1949, the Grand Prix Gobert for La Restauration in 1956, and the Prix Yvan Loiseau for Metternich in 1987.

== Works ==
- de Bertier de Sauvigny, Guillaume (1948). Le Comte Ferdinand de Bertier, 1782-1864, et l'énigme de la Congrégation. Paris: Presses Continentales. OCLC 2906795.
- de Bertier de Sauvigny, Guillaume (1977). La Restauration, 1815-1830. Paris: Hachette. ISBN 9782859620011. OCLC 4462799.
- de Bertier de Sauvigny, Guillaume (1986). Metternich. Paris: Fayard. ISBN 9782213017969. OCLC 319764698.
- de Bertier de Sauvigny, Guillaume (1999). Au service de l'Eglise de France : les Eudistes, 1680-1791. Paris: SPM. ISBN 9782901952312. OCLC 43578880.
