= Fyodor Rostopchin =

Moscow Governor

- Фёдор Ростопчин
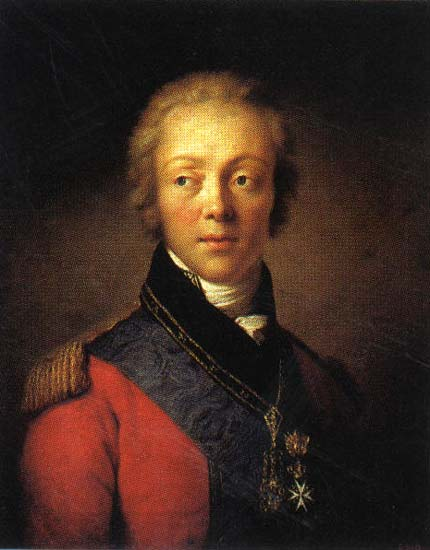
- Portrait by Salvatore Tonci

Governor-General of Moscow
- In office 24 May [O.S. 12 May] 1812 – 11 September [O.S. 30 August] 1814
- Preceded by: Ivan Gudovich
- Succeeded by: Alexander Tormasov

President of the Collegium of Foreign Affairs
- In office 17 April [O.S. 6 April] 1799 – 4 March [O.S. 20 February] 1801
- Preceded by: Alexander Bezborodko
- Succeeded by: Nikita Panin

Personal details
- Born: Fyodor Vasilievich Rostopchin; 23 March 1763 Kosmodemyanskoe village, Livensky uezd, Oryol Governorate, Russian Empire
- Died: 30 January 1826 (aged 62) Moscow, Russian Empire
- Spouse: Yekaterina Rostopchina
- Children: 8

Count Fyodor Vasilyevich Rostopchin (Note: Russian: Фёдор Васильевич Ростопчин) (23 March [O.S. 12 March] 1763 – 30 January [O.S. 18 January] 1826) was a Russian statesman and General of the Infantry who served as the Governor-General of Moscow during the French invasion of Russia, when he was responsible for the fire of Moscow in order to prevent the French from occupying this city. He was disgraced shortly after the Congress of Vienna, to which he had accompanied Tsar Alexander I. He appears as a character in Leo Tolstoy's 1869 novel War and Peace, in which he is presented very unfavorably.

== Biography ==
Rostopchin was born in the Kosmodemyanskoe village (modern-day Livensky District, Oryol Oblast of Russia) into a Russian noble family, the son of Vasily Fyodorovich Rostopchin (1733–1802), a landlord and former army major, and Nadezhda Aleksandrovna Rostopchina (née Kryukova) who died shortly after giving birth to his younger brother Peter. Rostopchin's date and place of birth, as well as his family roots are still questioned by biographers. While the date 12 March 1763 is written on his tombstone, other sources, including Rostopchin himself, pointed at 1765 as the real year and Moscow as the real place of his birth.

He also claimed that his family was very ancient and originated around the 15th century from Crimean Tatars, direct descendants of Genghis Khan. In Part 2 of the All-Russian Armorials of Noble Houses he named some Boris Davydovich nicknamed Rostopcha (from Russian rastopcha which means scatterbrain, blockhead) who arrived to Moscow to serve Vasili III of Russia, while in Part 4 his name changed to Boris Fyodorovich and later official encyclopedias renamed him to Mikhail Davydovich. His descendants supposedly served in Moscow, Tver, Klin and Rzhev at various army and state positions, yet none of them left any trace in Russian history, and some modern historians consider it to be a mystification.

He spent most of his childhood and youth at his father's family estate in the Kosmodemyanskoe village where he received home education. He was fluent in English, German, French and Italian languages, and from 1786 to 1788 he traveled to Europe. This trip, especially the time spent in Berlin, influenced his later views and his passion for self-education. He described it in his first book The Trip to Prussia (1792–1794) which has been compared to the Letters of a Russian Traveller by Nikolay Karamzin.

Feodor Rostopchin started his military career as a member of the Preobrazhensky Regiment in 1775, and in 1785 he was promoted to Podporuchik. He took part in the Russo-Swedish War (1788–1790) and the Russo-Turkish War (1788–1791). During the Russo-Swedish War he lost his younger brother Peter Rostopchin, whom he later described in his patriotic novel Oh, Those French! He served under Alexander Suvorov. They became good friends, and Rostopchin later defended Suvorov during his exile and was near him at his death.

Rostopchin had great influence over Paul I of Russia. In 1796 he was appointed adjutant general, grand-marshal of the court, and in 1799 president of the Collegium of Foreign Affairs. The same year he was granted the title of Count. His opposition to the French alliance and the murder of Paul I in 1801 resulted in his falling out of favor. He spent 10 years living in his family estate and writing comedies and satirical novels in which he ridiculed Francophiles. He was restored to favor in 1810 as conditions between France and Russia began to deteriorate. At the end of May 1812 he was appointed a Governor-General of Moscow. He was visited by Germaine de Stael on her way to St. Petersburg and Stockholm.

During the French invasion of Russia he was responsible for the defence of the city against Napoleon's Grande Armée, and he took every means available to rouse the population of the town and district to arm and join the army to defend the city against the invaders. After the Battle of Borodino it was clear to the Russian generals that their army could not deal with another battle; half of the population left the city, according to Leo Tolstoy. Rostopchin was invited to the council at Fili but excluded after a few hours and had the remaining population of the city evacuated, including all the city administrators and officials, leaving behind only a few French tutors and foreign shop keepers. In addition, the prisons and asylums were opened and the inhabitants set free by his order. No one came to meet the Emperor Napoleon with keys when he arrived at the city gates on 14 September. On the first night of French occupation, a fire broke out in the bazaar and a number of small fires erupted in other quarters. As the French rode through the streets to the Kremlin they found the streets deserted. That night the city began to burn in earnest. Rostopchin had left a small detachment of police, whom he charged with burning his house and the city to the ground, given that most buildings were made from wood. The city's fire-engines were disassembled. Fuses were left throughout the city to ignite the fires. Rostopchin left Moscow on 14 September 1812 and gave up his position as governor. Rostopchin owned two mansions in Moscow and an estate near Tarutino, Russia, to which he set fire. In Leo Tolstoy's War and Peace, Rostopchin was overwhelmed by events, and believed until the last moment that Moscow would not go down without a fight. These two quotations about the fire and the flight from Moscow can also be found in War and Peace:

When later on in his memoirs Count Rostopchín explained his actions at this time, he repeatedly says that he was then actuated by two important considerations: to maintain tranquillity in Moscow and expedite the departure of the inhabitants. If one accepts this twofold aim all Rostopchín’s actions appear irreproachable. “Why were the holy relics, the arms, ammunition, gunpowder, and stores of corn not removed? Why were thousands of inhabitants deceived into believing that Moscow would not be given up—and thereby ruined?” “To preserve the tranquillity of the city,” explains Count Rostopchín. “Why were bundles of useless papers from the government offices, and Leppich’s balloon and other articles removed?” “To leave the town empty,” explains Count Rostopchín. One need only admit that public tranquillity is in danger and any action finds a justification.

Tolstoy also attributes the Fire of Moscow to the constitution of the city and not to Rostopchin:

The French attributed the Fire of Moscow au patriotisme féroce de Rostopchíne (To Rostopchín’s ferocious patriotism), the Russians to the barbarity of the French. In reality, however, it was not, and could not be, possible to explain the burning of Moscow by making any individual, or any group of people, responsible for it. Moscow was burned because it found itself in a position in which any town built of wood was bound to burn, quite apart from whether it had, or had not, a hundred and thirty inferior fire engines. Deserted Moscow had to burn as inevitably as a heap of shavings has to burn on which sparks continually fall for several days. A town built of wood, where scarcely a day passes without conflagrations when the house owners are in residence and a police force is present, cannot help burning when its inhabitants have left it and it is occupied by soldiers who smoke pipes, make campfires of the Senate chairs in the Senate Square, and cook themselves meals twice a day.

In 1814 the Rostopchine family left Russia, going first to the Duchy of Warsaw, then to the German Confederation, Vienna, the Italian peninsula and finally in 1817 to France under the Bourbon Restoration. In Paris, he established a salon; his wife and daughter converted to Roman Catholicism. He claimed innocence against the charge of arson, and had a pamphlet printed and distributed in Paris proclaiming so in 1823, but subsequently admitted to his role in ordering the city's destruction. He returned to Imperial Russia in 1825 and died in Moscow suffering from asthma and hemorrhoid complications. He was buried at the Pyatnitskoye Cemetery.

== Family ==
He married Ekaterina Petrovna Protassova (1775–1869), and had eight children. Among them:

- Count Sergei Fyodorovich Rostopchin;
- Countess Natalya Fyodorovna Rostopchine;
- Countess Sofiya Fyodorovna Rostopchine, who married in 1819 and became a noted French novelist under the title of comtesse de Ségur;
- Countess Lise Fyodorovna Rostopchine;
- Count Andrei Fyodorovich Rostopchine, married Yevdokiya Petrovna Sushkova.
