= Evdokiya Rostopchina =

Russian poet

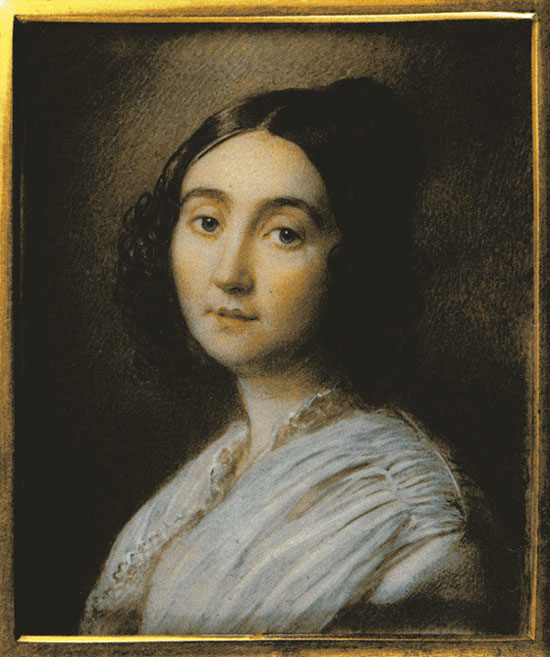
- Born: December 23, 1811; Russia
- Died: December 3, 1858 (aged 46)
- Occupation: Poet
- Notable work: Description of High Society

Evdokiya Petrovna Rostopchina (née Sushkova; Russian: Евдокия Петровна Ростопчина; December 23, 1811 – December 3, 1858) was a Russian poet.

== Biography ==
After her mother died when Evdokiya Rostopchina was about the age of six, Evdokiya Sushkova grew up in Moscow in the family of her maternal grandfather, Ivan Alexandrovich Pashkov. The young girl was fond of reading and learned German, French, Italian, and English.

In 1831, her friend Pyotr Vyazemsky published her first poem, "Talisman", in his almanac Severnye Tsvety (Northern Flowers). In 1833, she married count Andrey Fedorovich Rostopchin, a rich son of the former Moscow commander-in-chief, Fyodor Rostopchin.

In 1836, the family moved to Petersburg, where the countess was well received in the high intellectual society of the capital. Her literary work was supported by such poets as Lermontov, Pushkin, Zhukovsky. Ogarev, Mey, and Tyutchev devoted their poems to her. Her popular literary salon hosted such famous guests as Vyazemsky, Gogol, Myatlev, Pletnyov, and others.

Poems about unrequited love comprised a large part of her poetry. In 1839, she published a book Descriptions of High Society, which was ignored both by readers and critics. Although Rostopchina also wrote prose and comedy, these works did not enjoy any particular success.

During her trip abroad in 1845, the poet wrote an allegorical ballad named "Forced Marriage" (Russian: Насильный брак), in which she condemned Russia's relationship with Poland. On the orders of enraged Nicholas I, Rostopchina was forbidden to appear in the capital; and till the death of the tsar, she lived in Moscow.

Rostopchina continued to write poems, plays, and translations, but public interest in her work already decreased. In the last years of her life, she ridiculed various literary movements in Russia; as a result, she found herself in complete isolation. Almost forgotten by the public and succumbing after two years of sickness, Rostopchina died on December 3, 1858.
