= Yuri Bulgakov =

Russian governor and ambassador

Duke Yuri Mikhailovich Bulgakov-Golitsyn (Russian: Юрий Михайлович Булгаков-Голицын) was a governor of Pskov province and Russian ambassador to Hungary in the 16th century. Bulgakov came from a princely family which had roots in Ingria, eastern Finland, and Pskov region. He died in Pskov.

== Career ==
He was governor (or viceroy) of two important provinces: Pskov and Novgorod. In 1550 he was ambassador to Hungary. According to documents contemporary with him, he was not known with the byname Golitsin but Bulgakov (from Kovalenko) and it was his sons who were the first generation to use byname Golitsin (according to Ikonnikov). To use the name Golitsin as his name is anachronistic.

Ivan IV wanted to underline that he held a more exalted position as sovereign than the parvenu king Gustav of Sweden. So, he forced Gustav to have contact with his governor of the border province of Pskov, and not directly with the central government in Moscow. Swedish diplomats were not agreeable to that and objected. Ivan mentioned that governor Yuri Bulgakov was directly descended from kings of Lithuania; thus (although not himself a king) Bulgakov was a high enough negotiation counterpart with Gustav, who was himself not son of kings but an upstart to his throne (Kovalenko).
