= Yekaterina Petrovna Rostopchina =

Russian aristocrat and writer

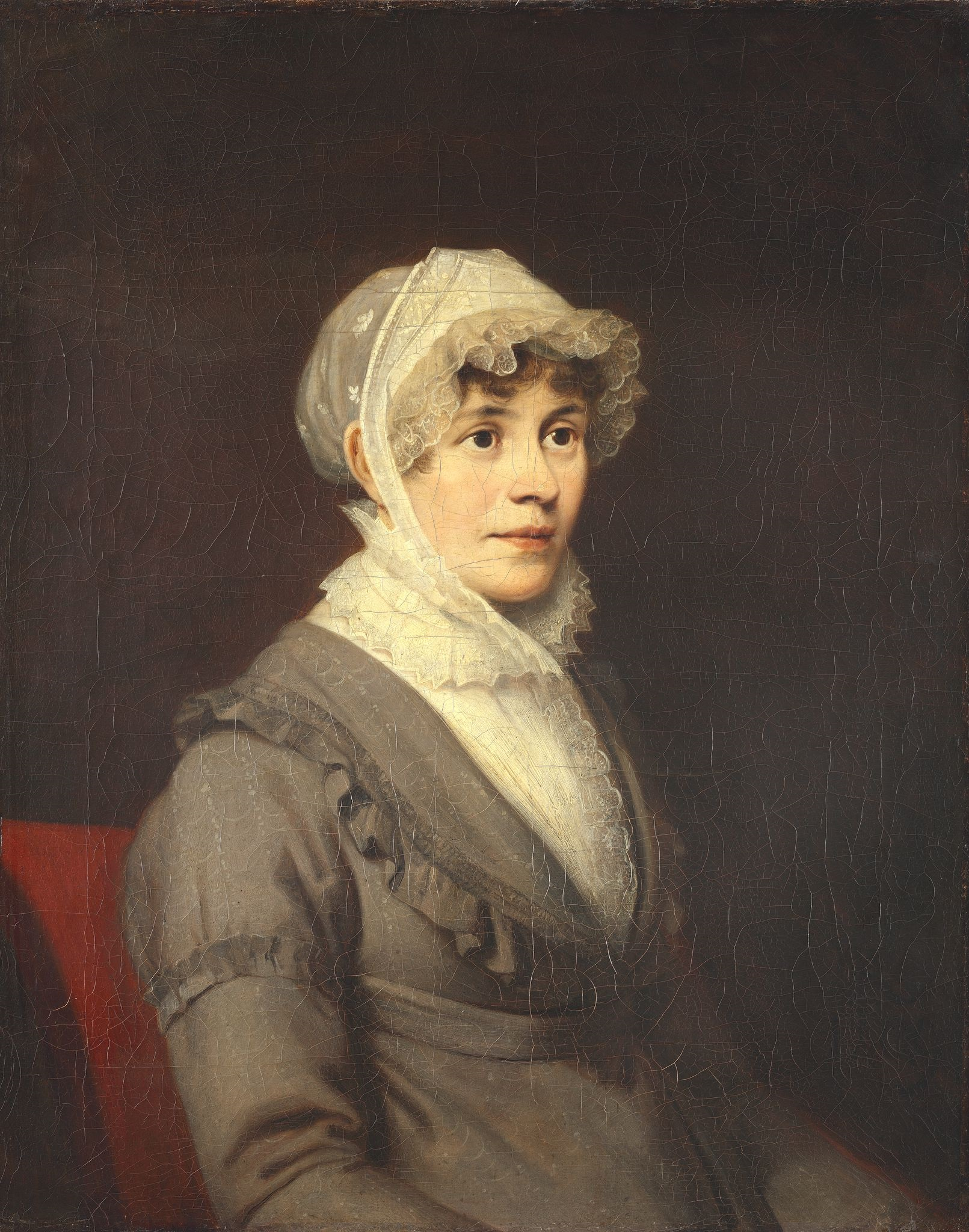
- Portrait by Orest Kiprensky, 1809
- Born: Yekaterina Petrovna Protasova; 1776
- Died: 14 September 1859 (aged 83); Moscow, Russian Empire
- Noble family: Protasov
- Spouse: Fyodor Rostopchin
- Issue: Count Sergei Feodorovich; Countess Natalya Feodorovna; Countess Sofiya Fyodorovna; Countess Elizaveta Feodorovna; Count Andrei Feodorovich
- Father: Pyotr S. Protasov
- Mother: Alexandra Ivanovna
- Occupation: Maid of honour, writer

Countess Yekaterina Petrovna Rostopchina (Russian: Екатерина Петровна Ростопчина; 1776 – 14 September 1859) was a Russian aristocrat and writer. She was married to Fyodor Rostopchin, who served as governor of Moscow during the French Invasion of Russia.

== Early life ==
Yekaterina was the second of five daughters born to Senator Lieutenant General Pyotr S. Protasov (died 1794) and his wife Alexandra Ivanovna (died 1782). She had four sisters:

- Alexandra Petrovna (1774–1842), married Prince Alexei Golitsyn
- Varvara Petrovna, died unmarried
- Vera Petrovna (1780–1814), married Hilarion Vasilyevich Vasilchikov
- Anna Petrovna, married Count Bartholomew Vasilyevich Tolstoy

Yekaterina and her sisters were orphaned at an early age. They were raised by their aunt, Anna Stepanovna Protasova, who was a lady-in-waiting and a personal friend of Empress Catherine the Great. Protasova ensured that her nieces received an excellent education, most notably in foreign languages, including Latin, Greek but neglecting Russian. They were also not so well educated in Russian history and religion. At the time of Alexander I's coronation, each of the unmarried sisters received the title of countess at their aunt's request.

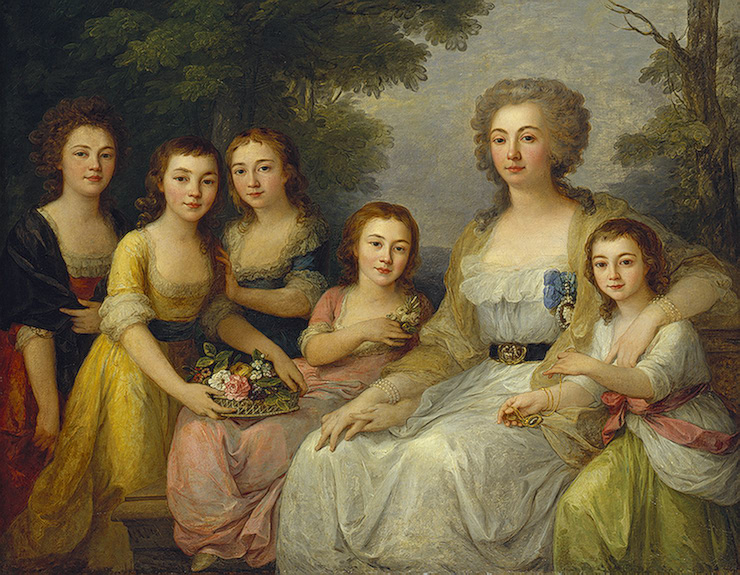
Anna Protasova, along with her nieces

Yekaterina was tall, attractive, and had an expressive face with lively black eyes. However, she was considered reserved and unsociable.

== Marriage ==
Yekaterina was granted the title maid of honour in 1791. She married Count Fyodor Vasilievich Rostopchin, who appreciated her serious nature, in early 1794. The couple had four sons and four daughters and had a happy marriage until Yekaterina's conversion to Catholicism.

Being a freethinker with little knowledge of the Russian Eastern Orthodox faith, Yekaterina, along with her sisters, converted to Roman Catholicism. That conversion destroyed the family's happiness. Her husband was the mayor of the city during the Fire of Moscow, and his wife, being a zealous Catholic, was to be invidiously portrayed as an enthroned mistress.

In 1814, Rostopchin resigned as mayor, and the couple moved to Germany and then to France. After their return to Moscow, in 1824, their 18-year-old daughter, Yelizaveta, Rostopchin's favourite, died in early March the next year. Yelizaveta had converted to Catholicism before her death; on his daughter's conversion, Rostopchin wrote, "Under the circumstances, suggests a direct effect of mother". The blow of his daughter's conversion broke him, and he died in 1826. Rostopchin left orders before his death for Yekaterina to be removed from supervising the education of their young son Andrei, and from the administration of his estate. Yekaterina was not present at her husband's funeral, and lived alone after he died.

== Widowhood ==
In 1826, the same year as her husband's death, Yekaterina published excerpts of Metropolitan Philaret Drozdov's defence of Catholic doctrine, which caused a fair amount of controversy. In 1833, she conducted an investigation regarding the information, that there were in the abbey of Rostopchina Borzhua priest's vestments at the altar of the church village of Raven. She inherited the legacy of her husband. She raised 12 girls, not her own, aged 7–14, all of them French and German. Subsequently, Voronov was admitted into the Catholic Church.

== Later life ==
Over the course of time, her Catholicism only reinforced her reserved nature. In the summer, she lived in a house left to her by her husband, in the abandoned village of Raven. In the winter, she lived in an old house on Basmannaya Street, surrounded by French women and Catholic catechists, and used it for the support of Catholics in the area. However, almost no one in the house went to Mass, but they drew and also read spiritual books.

Yekaterina died on 14 September 1859 at the age of 83. She was buried in a Catholic cemetery in the mountains of Vvedensky, near Moscow.

== Children ==
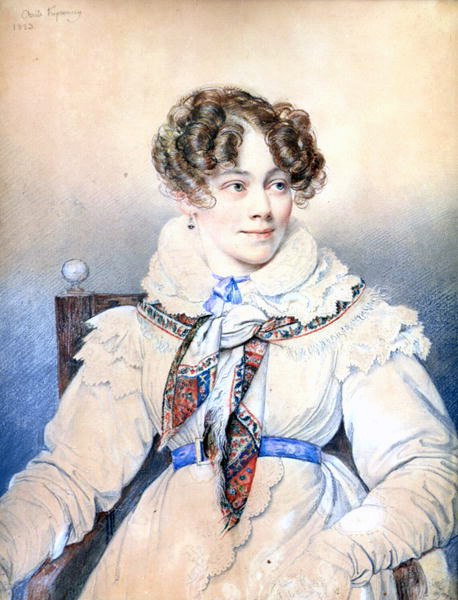
Sophia F. de Segur

- Sergei Fyodorovich (1796–1836) received his education at home and, in 1809, was appointed a page. He was appointed adjutant to Hussars Lieutenant Akhtynskiy in April 1812 without an examination and then to the Duke of Oldenburg. He later saw service with the Serbian monarch Đorđe Petrović, Prince Mikhail Bogdanovich, and Barclay de Tolly, eventually becoming staff captain of the Cavalry Regiment. Sergei was married to Princess Maria de Ignatievna Ruiz-Sol (1799–1838). The couple died childless.
- Natalia Fyodorovna (1797–1866), author of the notes of the Rostropovich family in 1812, in Yaroslavl. Natalia married Dmitri V. Naryshkin (1792–1831) in Paris in July 1819 and lived primarily in Crimea because of its patronage of the artist Ivan Konstantinovich Aivazovsky.
- Sofiya Fyodorovna, later Sophie, Comtesse de Ségur (1799–1874), a French children's writer. She married Count Edmond de Ségur (1798–1869) in Paris, in July 1819. She lived in France after her marriage, and her favourite seat was the Château des Nouettes in Normandy, which she bought with money from her father.
- Paul Fyodorovich (1803–1806)
- Maria Fyodorovna (born mid. 1805)
- Yelizaveta Fyodorovna (1807–1825), described as her father's favorite, "a girl of rare beauty, intelligence and dignity". Elizabeth's early death, in March 1825, was a severe blow to the Rostopchin family; she had secretly converted to Catholicism before her death.
- Mikhail Fyodorovich (born mid. 1810)
- Andrei Rostopchin (1813–1892), Master of the Horse of the Supreme Court. Andrew served as the Directorate General of Eastern Siberia, and retired in 1886 with the rank of privy councillor. His first wife was Yevdokiya Petrovna Sushkova (1811–1858), a writer, wed in 1833; later on he married Anna Vladimirovna Miretskaya, née Skorobokach (died 1901).

== See also ==
- Crypto-Papism

== Sources ==
- Recueil de preuves sur la vérité de la religion, Moscou, 1810, 12°
- Miroir de la vie d'un véritable disciple du Christ. Traduit du Russe, Moscou, 1817.
- Album allégorique", Moscou, 1829, 16°
- Recueil d'anti-alogies, ou Discussions religieuses, par une dame convertie à la religion catholique. Ouvrage publié par M. Gaston de Ségur, Paris, 1842, 18°
- Russian Literature portraits XVIII-XIX centuries. Publ. Conducted. Book. Nikolai Mikhailovich. St. Petersburg. In 1906. Volume I Issue I. Number 11.
- Russian Biographical Dictionary: Romanov-Ryasovsky. – Ed. Russian Historical Society: ed. BL Modzalevsky. – Petrograd: type. ASC. On the Island "Kadima", 1918. Vol. 17. p. 229
