= Stroganov Church =

Church building in Nizhny Novgorod

Church of the Nativity
- Рождественская церковь
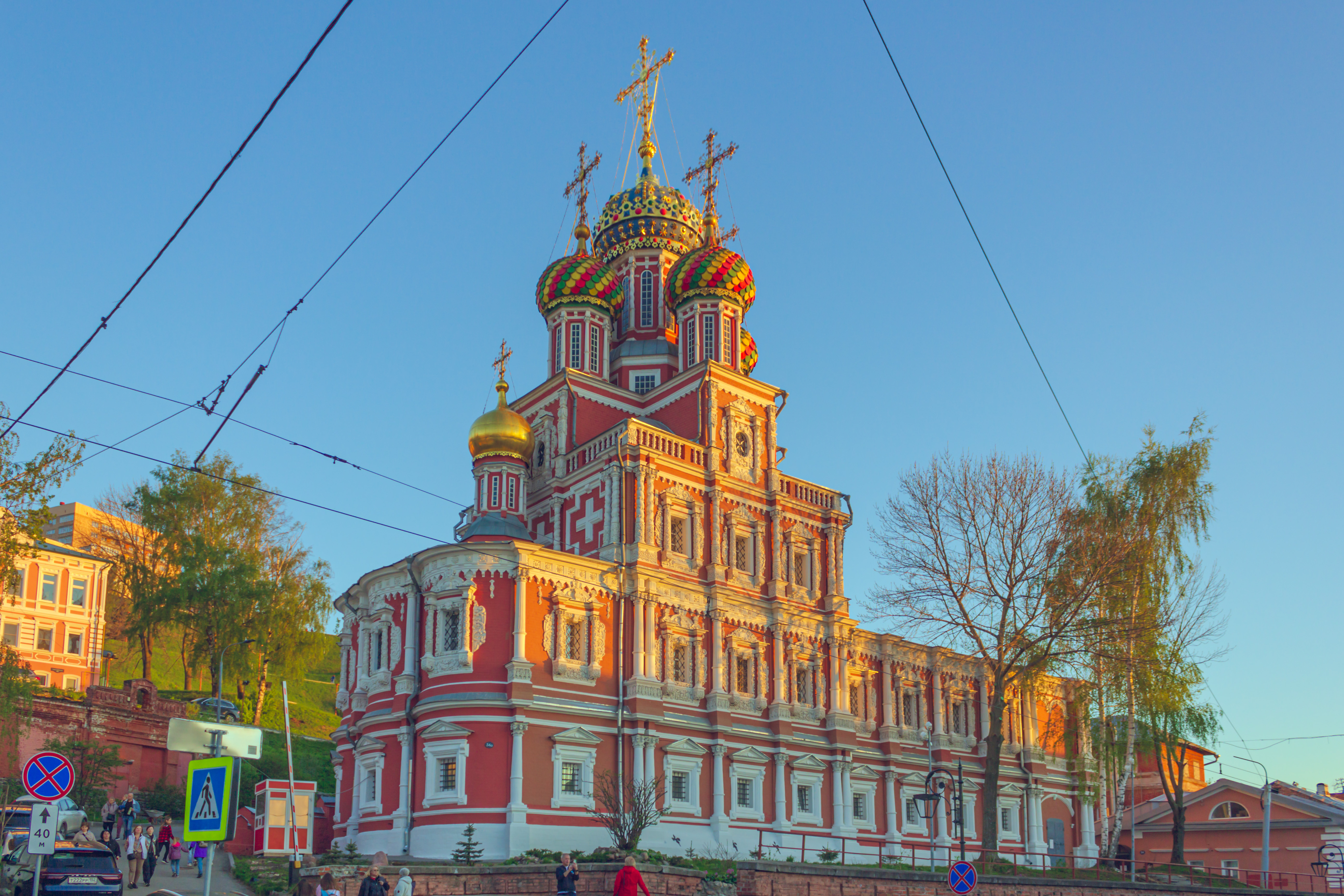

Religion
- Affiliation: Russian Orthodox
- Region: Nizhny Novgorod Oblast

Location
- Location: Nizhny Novgorod
- Country: Russia
- Interactive map of Church of the Nativity
- Coordinates: 56.32688°N 43.98672°E

Architecture
- Architect: Lev Dahl
- Founder: Grigory Dmitriyevich Stroganov
- Completed: 1719

Website
- nne.ru

Church of the Nativity of the Blessed Virgin Mary (Russian: Церковь Собора Пресвятой Богородицы), better known as Nativity or Stroganov is a Russian Orthodox church, located at the Rozhdestvenskaya Street in Nizhny Novgorod. It was built in 1696–1719 on the means of the merchant Grigory Stroganov.

== History ==
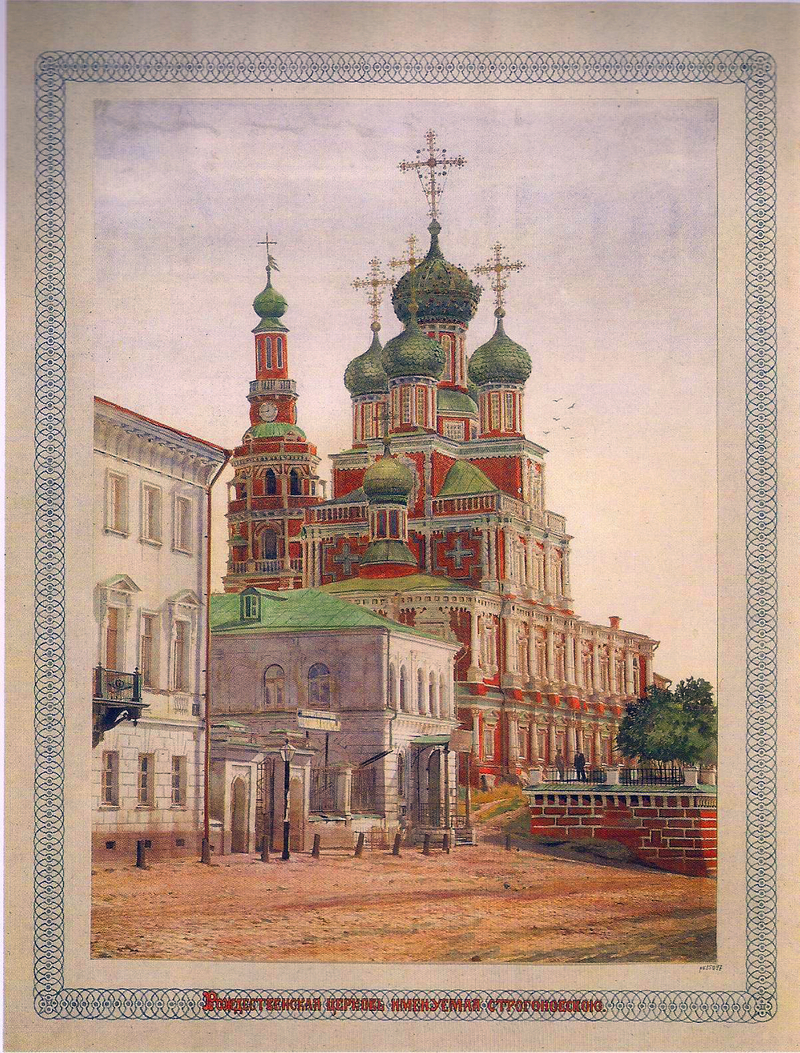
Stroganov Church on the painted photo of Andrei Karelin and Ivan Shishkin

The construction of the church began in 1696. The construction was almost completed by 1701, but a fire broke out in the temple. The burnt down church was restored by the wife of merchant Grigory Dmitrievich Stroganov - Maria Yakovlevna. It was consecrated in 1719 by Archbishop Pitirim of Nizhny Novgorod and Alatyr (1719-1738).

In 1722, the church was closed by Peter the Great until his death (1725). The temple was often burning (in 1768, 1782, 1788). In 1807-1812 Alexander Stroganov carried out major repairs. In the 1870s and 1880s, the church was thoroughly restored by the projects of Lev Dahl and Robert Kilevain.

In the 1860s the belltower start to lean, and in 20 years has deviated by 1.2 meters. In 1887, its upper tiers were dismantled and collected again.

In the Soviet era, a decision was made to destroy the church, but the rector of the church Sergius Veisov (1915-1934) collected historical documents and photographs, read several lectures on the cultural significance of the Stroganov Baroque, and preserved this temple.

The church was again consecrated July 3, 1993.

== Architecture ==
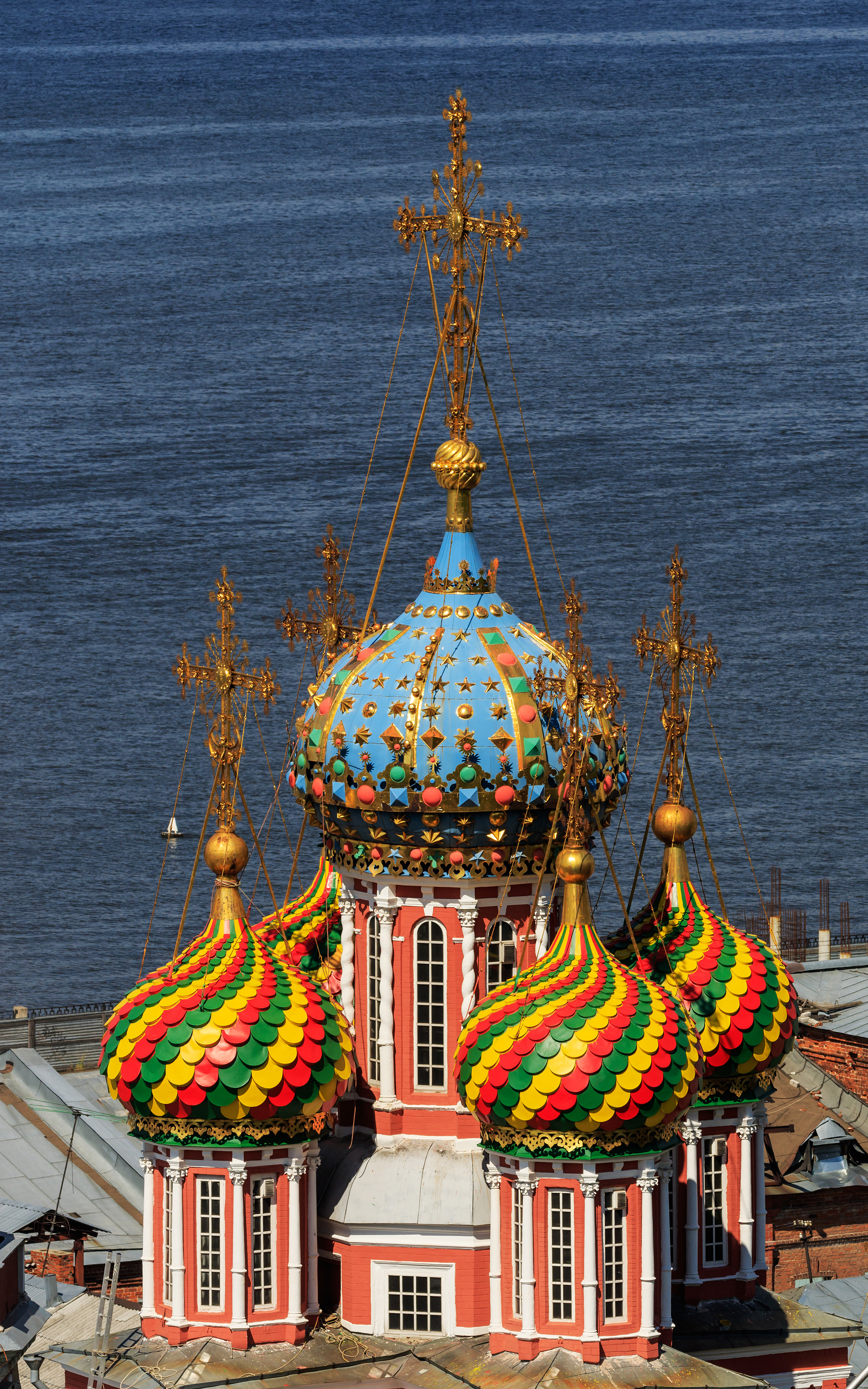
The domes of the church

The church is two-level: at the top there is a three-apsidal altar, a prayer hall, a refectory and a porch. Outside and inside the church is decorated with white stone carvings.

The belltower is an octagon on cube. The dome is crowned with a cross with a weather vane. On the stone slabs there are Slavic letters that divide the circle into 17 parts, according to the Old Russian calculation of time. The fate of the previous mechanism is unknown. A new mechanism has now been installed.

== Gallery ==
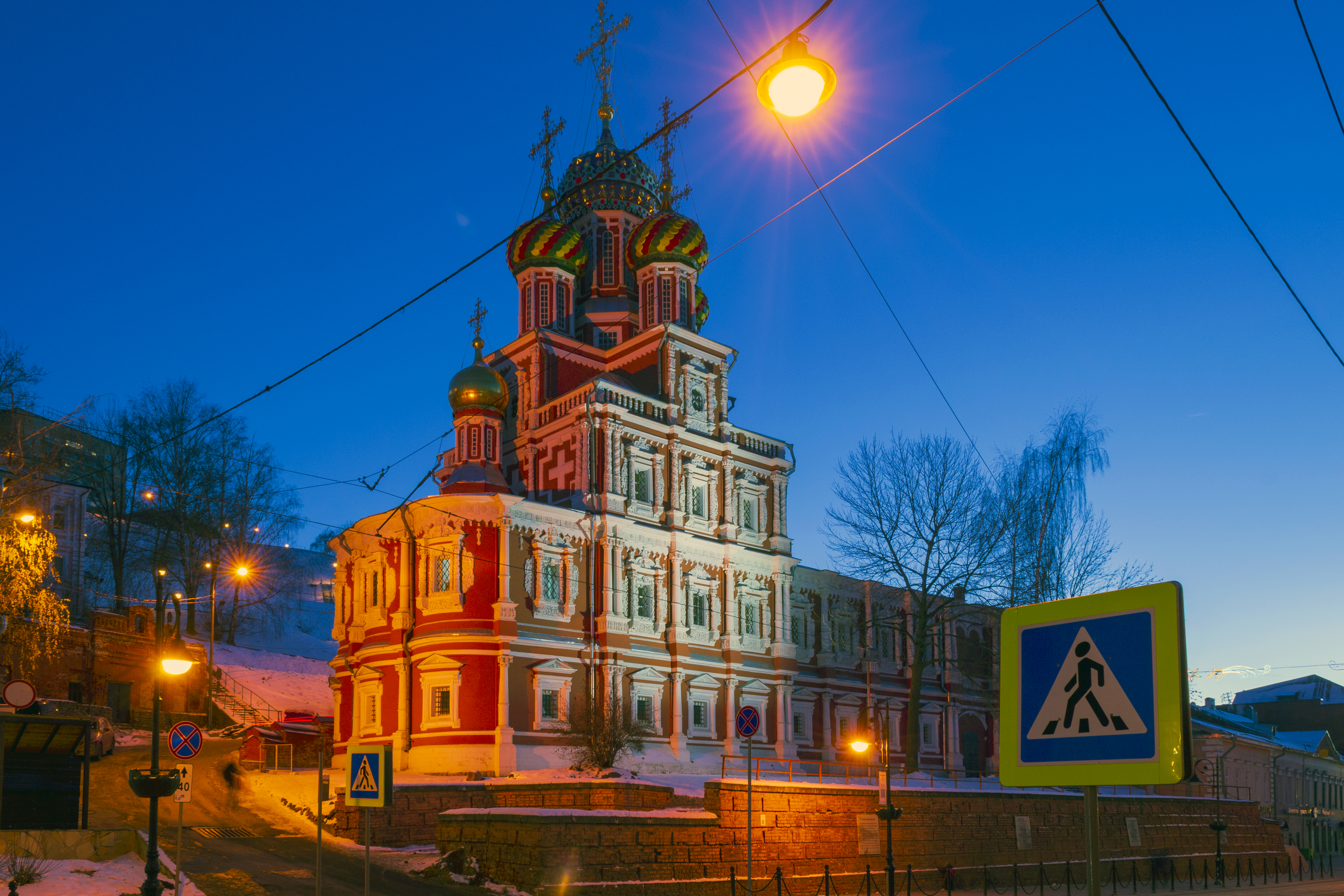
Night view from Rozhdestvenskaya Street

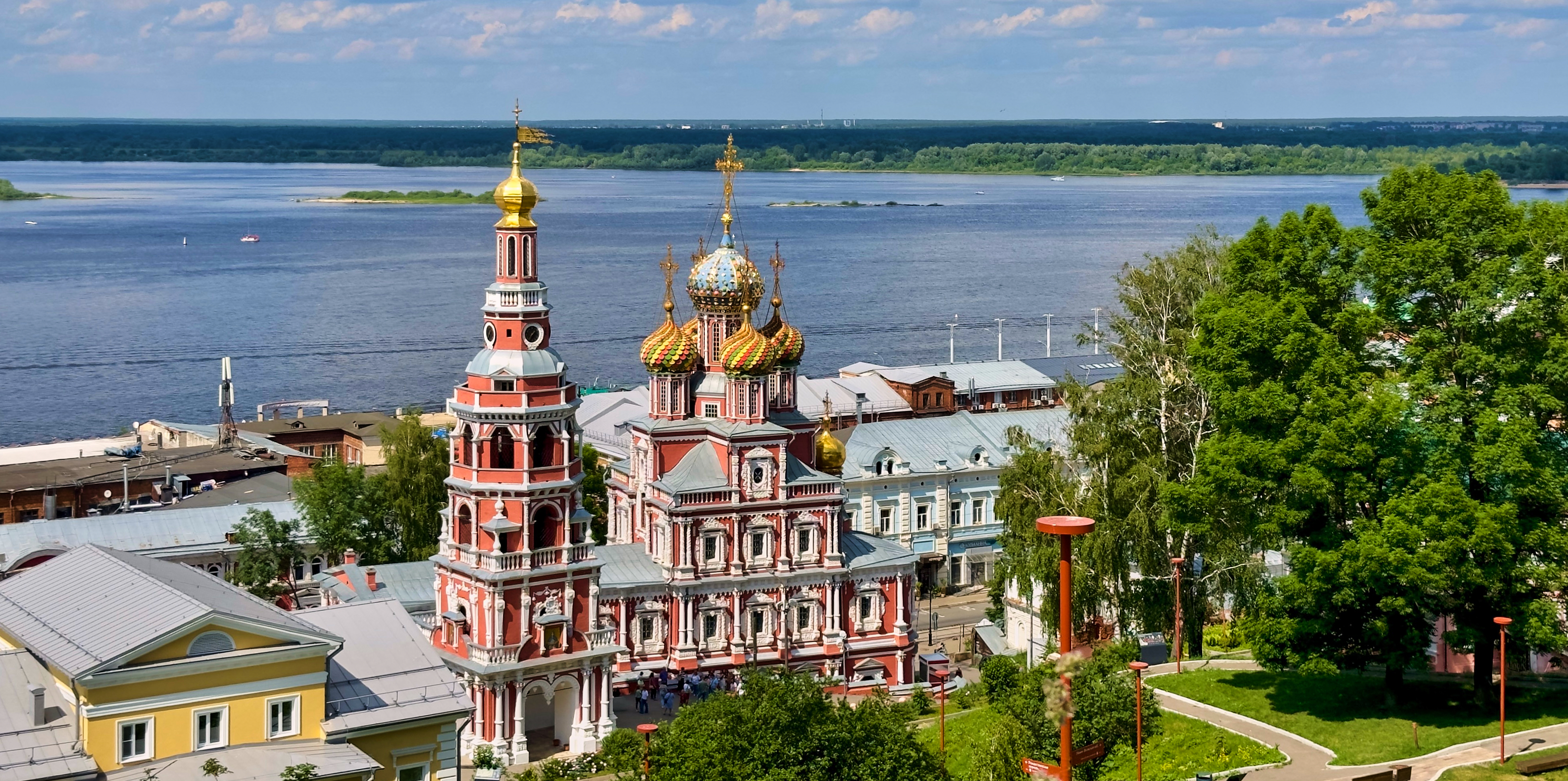
View from the side of the slope

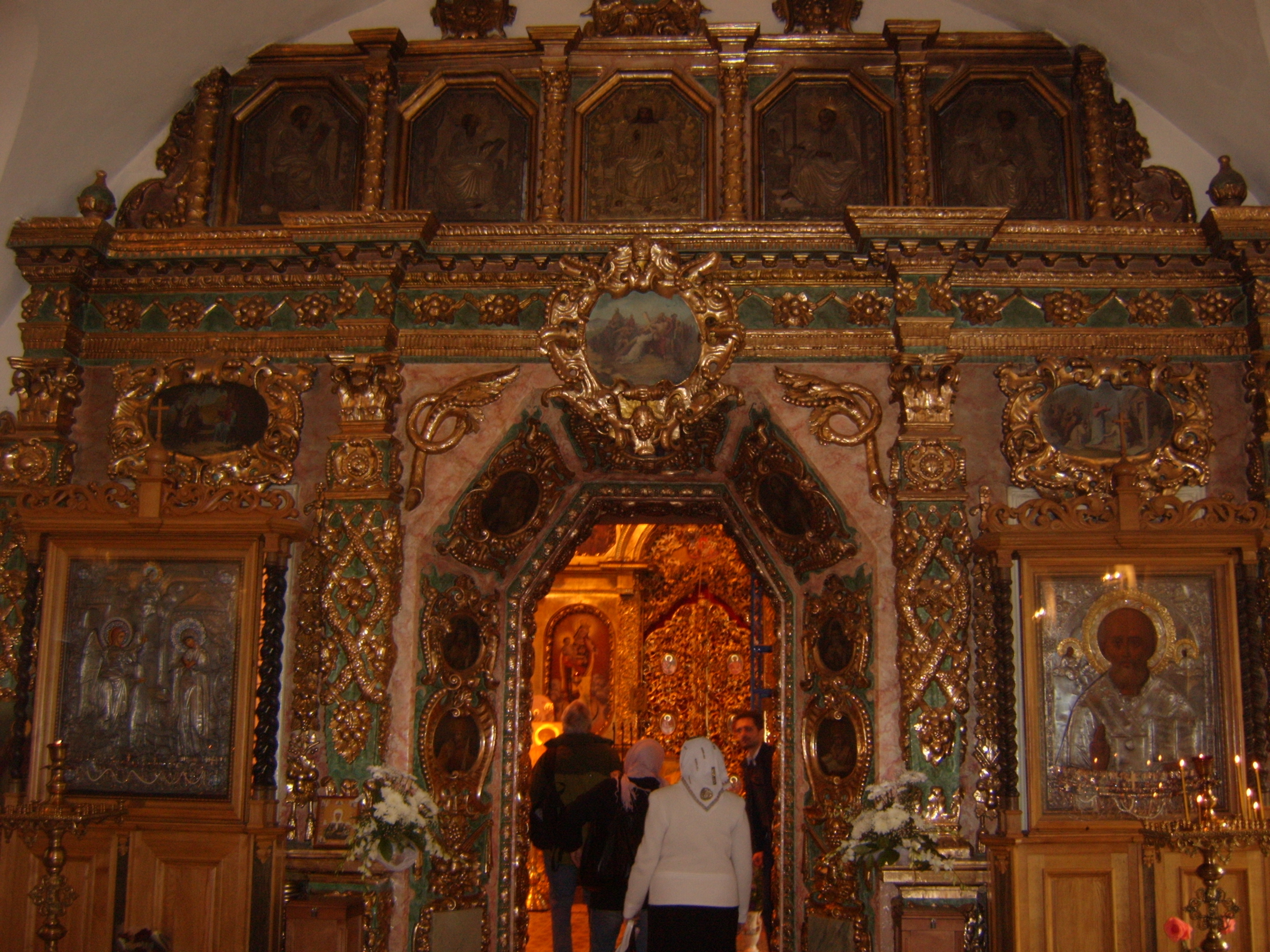
Interior of the church

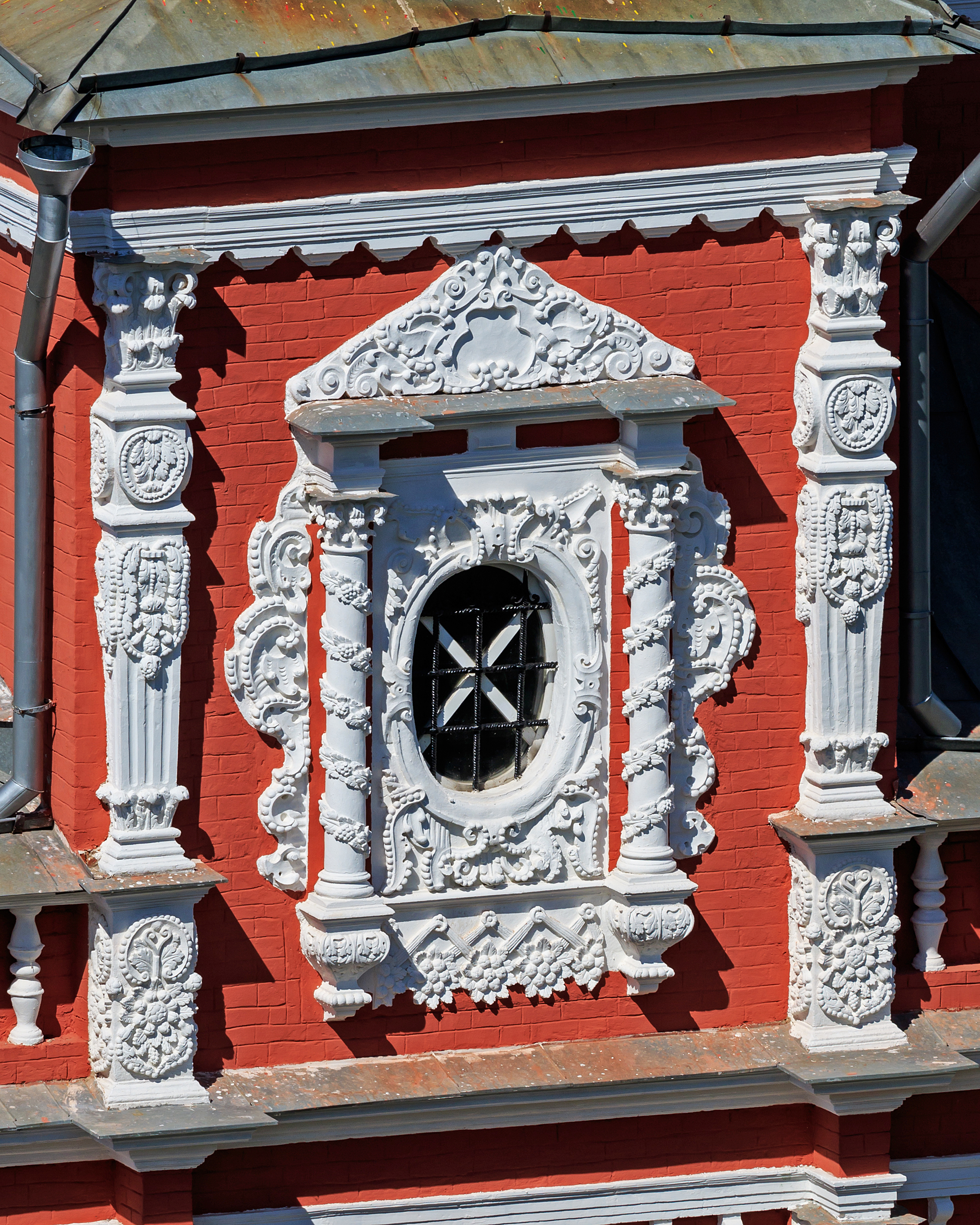
Window

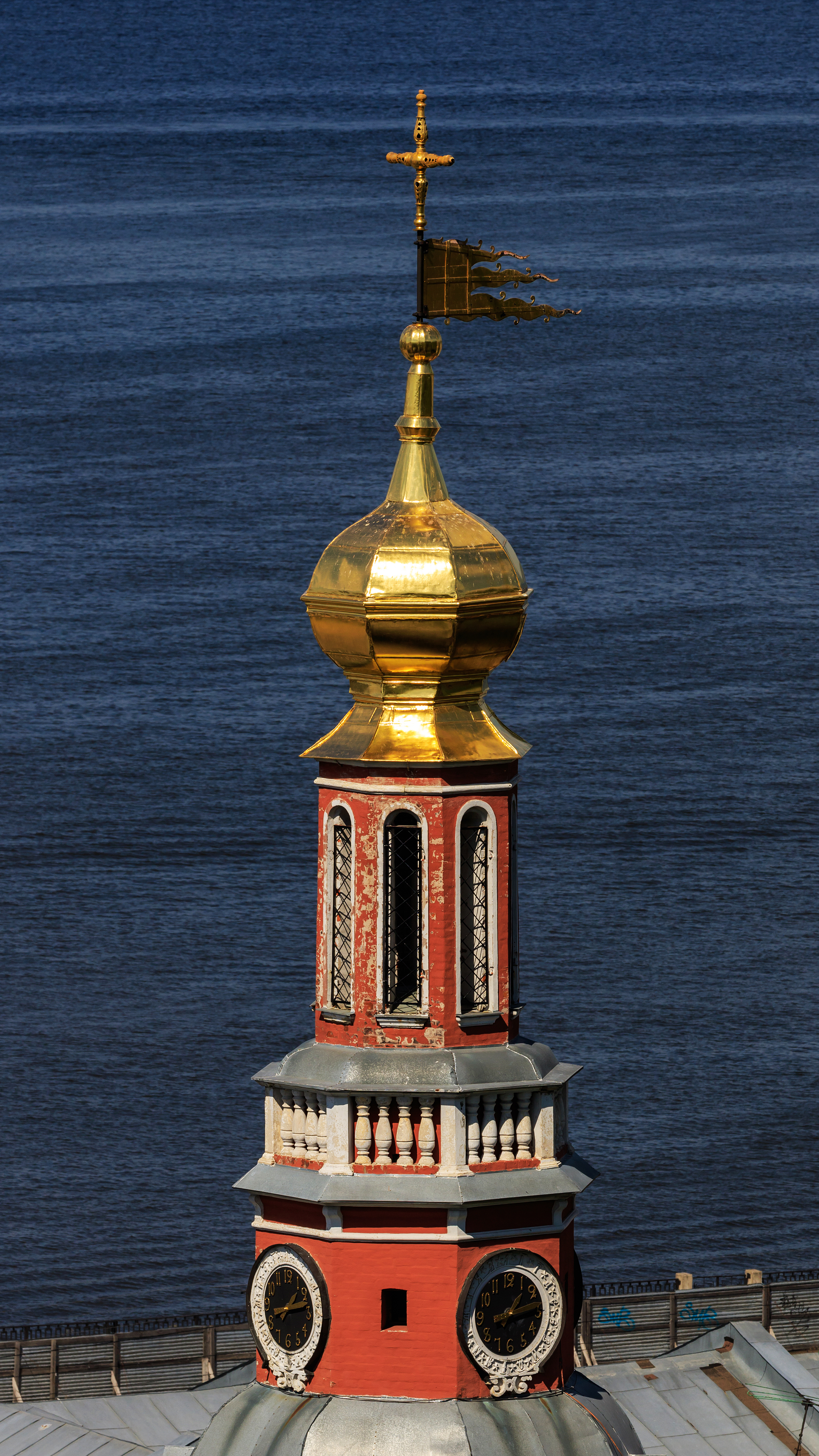
The dome of the belltower
