= Rozhdestvenskaya Street =

Street in Nizhny Novgorod, Russia

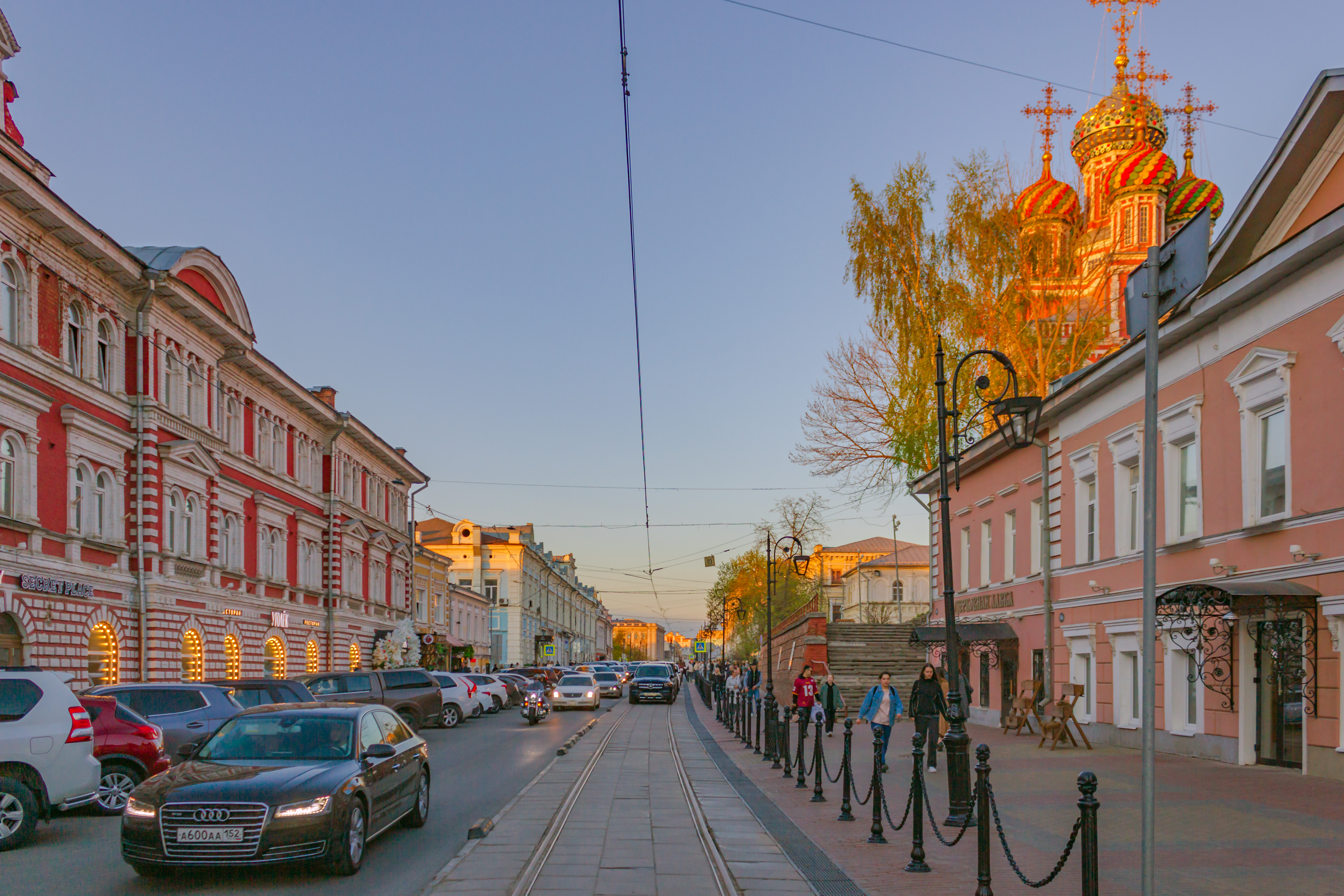
- Rozhdestvenskaya Street after reconstruction in 2012
- Interactive map of Rozhdestvenskaya Street
- Native name: Рождественская улица (Russian)
- Former names: Kooperativnaya Street, Mayakovsky Street
- Location: Nizhny Novgorod, Russia
- Postal code: 603001
- Nearest Metro station: Gorkovskaya
- Coordinates: 56°19′42″N 43°59′15″E

Rozhdestvenskaya Street (Russian: Рождественская улица, lit. 'Nativity Street') is a historic street in Nizhny Novgorod. Is a unique open-air museum, there are only stone houses, the history of the oldest of which dates back to the middle of the 18th century. Officially there are 35 monuments of architecture. The most famous landmark is the Church of the Nativity.

== History ==
=== Russian tsardom and Russian empire ===
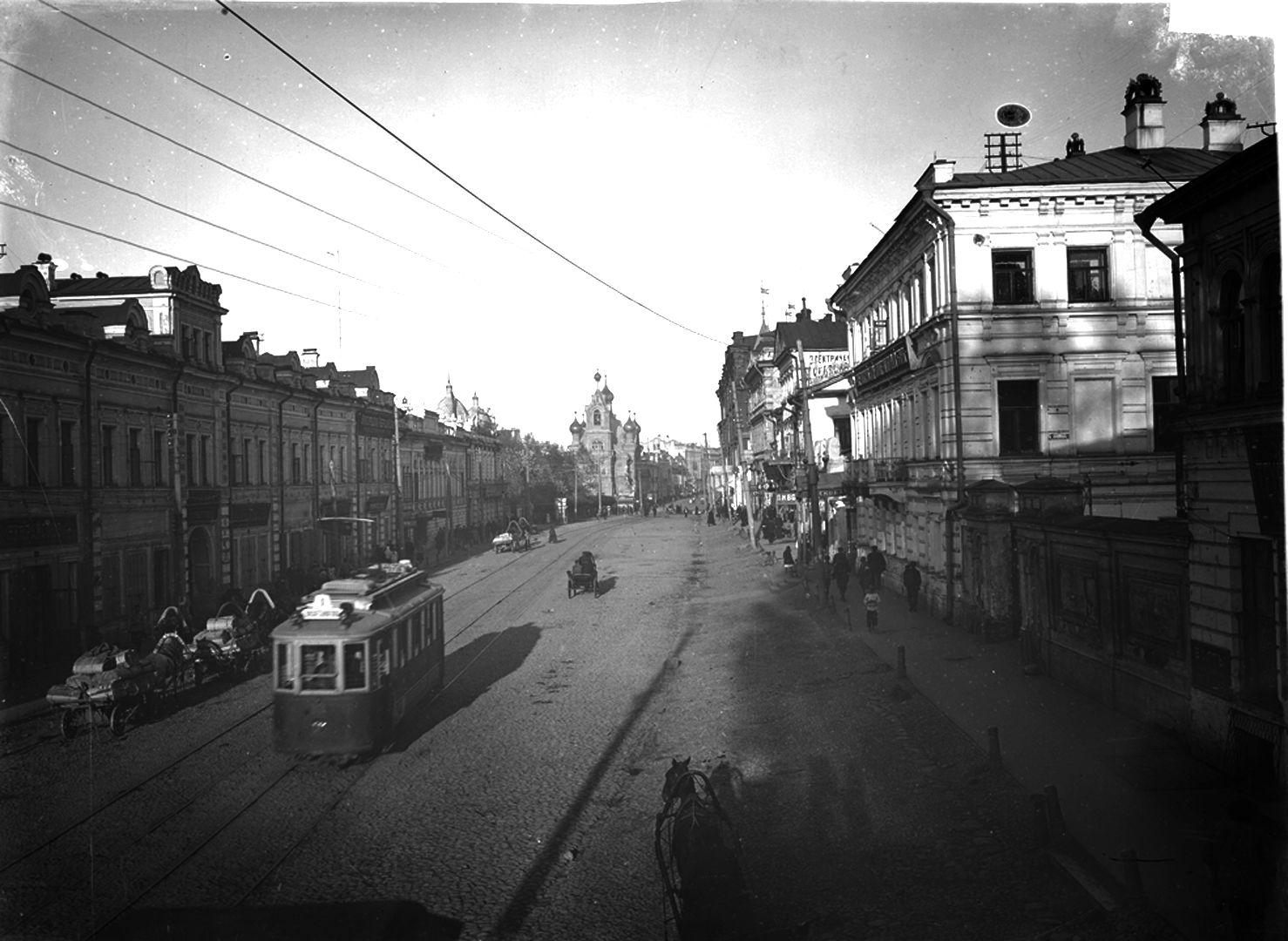
Church of Saints Cosmas and Damian (new, architect L. Dal)

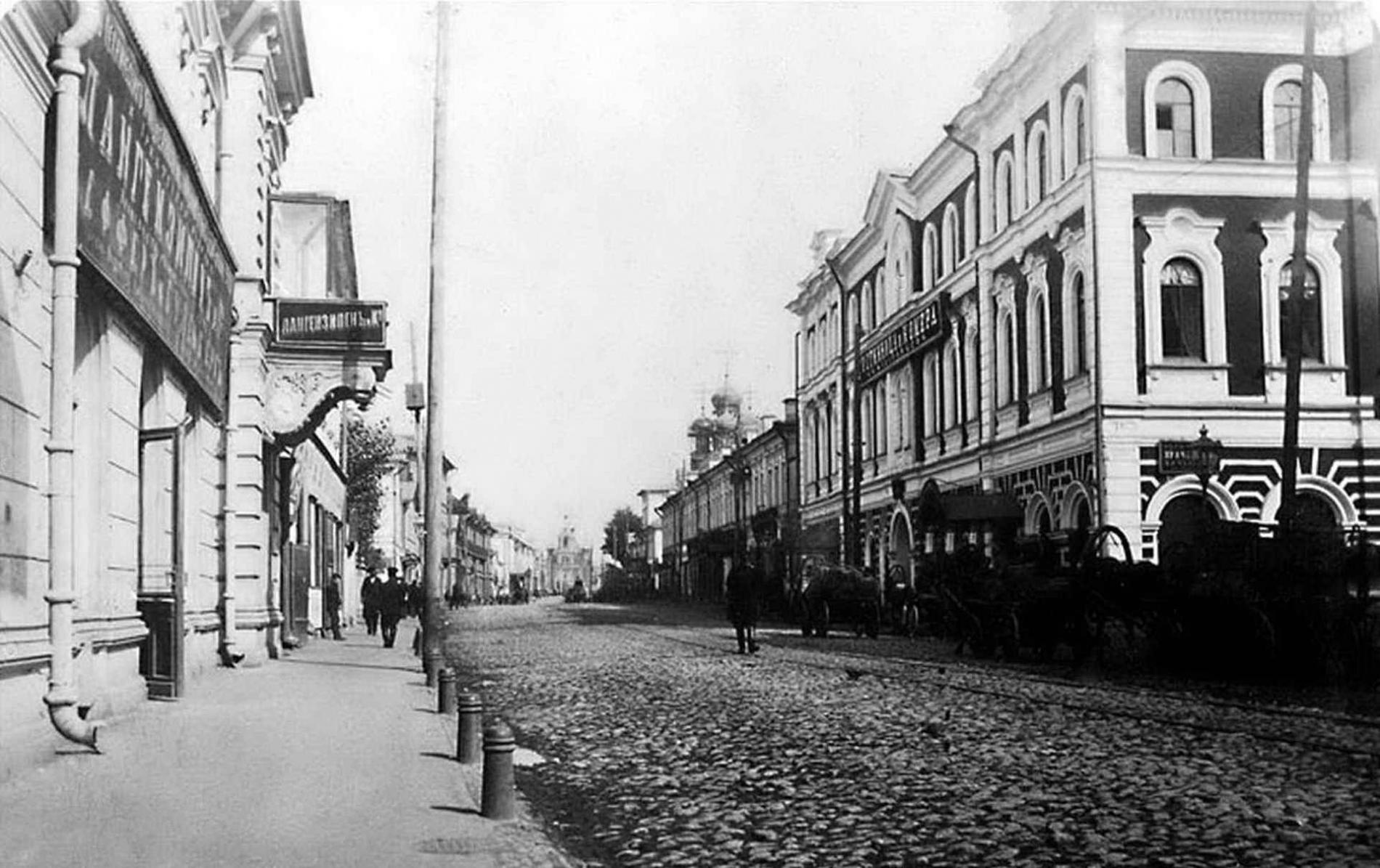
Rozhdesteskaya Street. 1898

The settlement on the site of the modern Rozhdesvenskaya street began literally from the time the city was founded. It is known that in the 14th century, this territory was part of the border of wood-reinforced fortifications known as the Lesser Ostrog.

The 17th century was a period of economic growth in the history of Nizhny Novgorod. At the beginning of the century, the street was called Kosmodemyanskaya by the church of Cosmas and Damian located in the center of the Lower Posad. But in 1653 a stone Christmas temple was built and the street was called Rozhdestvenskaya. This church was badly damaged by fires. In 1719, merchant Grigory Stroganov built next to her another stone church, which has survived until our time. This church is called in different ways. Stroganov – by the name of the merchant Stroganov or Nativity – by the name of the street.

At the beginning of the 19th century, by order of the engineer Agustín de Betancourt, it was decided to build this part of the city with stone buildings, in order to avoid fires. And, in the course of implementing this decision, the street was straightened by the demolition of old buildings. Rozhdestvenskaya Street since 1816 has become closely associated with the trade fair. Rich merchants build hotels, profitable houses and banks.

The street underwent a reconstruction in 1835–1839, when instead of the house known merchant Sofronov was created Sofronov Square. At the exit of the street to the Oksky Pontoon Bridge warehouses were demolished and St. Alexius Square, named for the chapel in the name of St. Alexius the Metropolitan, was created. Now the square is called Blagoveshchenskaya (Annunciation (not to be confused with the former name of the Minin and Pozharsky Square)).

The All-Russia Exhibition of 1896 changed the street. In the area of the Unity Square and the Pokhvalinsky descent, funiculars were built. Opposite the Oksky Pontoon Bridge, a power station appeared that provided the city with electricity. 21 June 1896 in Nizhny Novgorod was opened tramway. The line, 3.5 versts long (3.7 kilometers or 2.32 miles), passed from Skoba (Unity Square) to the bridge, connecting both funiculars. At the opening of the exhibition on Rozhdestvenskaya Street, the houses of the Blinov brothers' merchants (Blinovsky Passage) and the stock exchange were built.

=== Soviet era ===
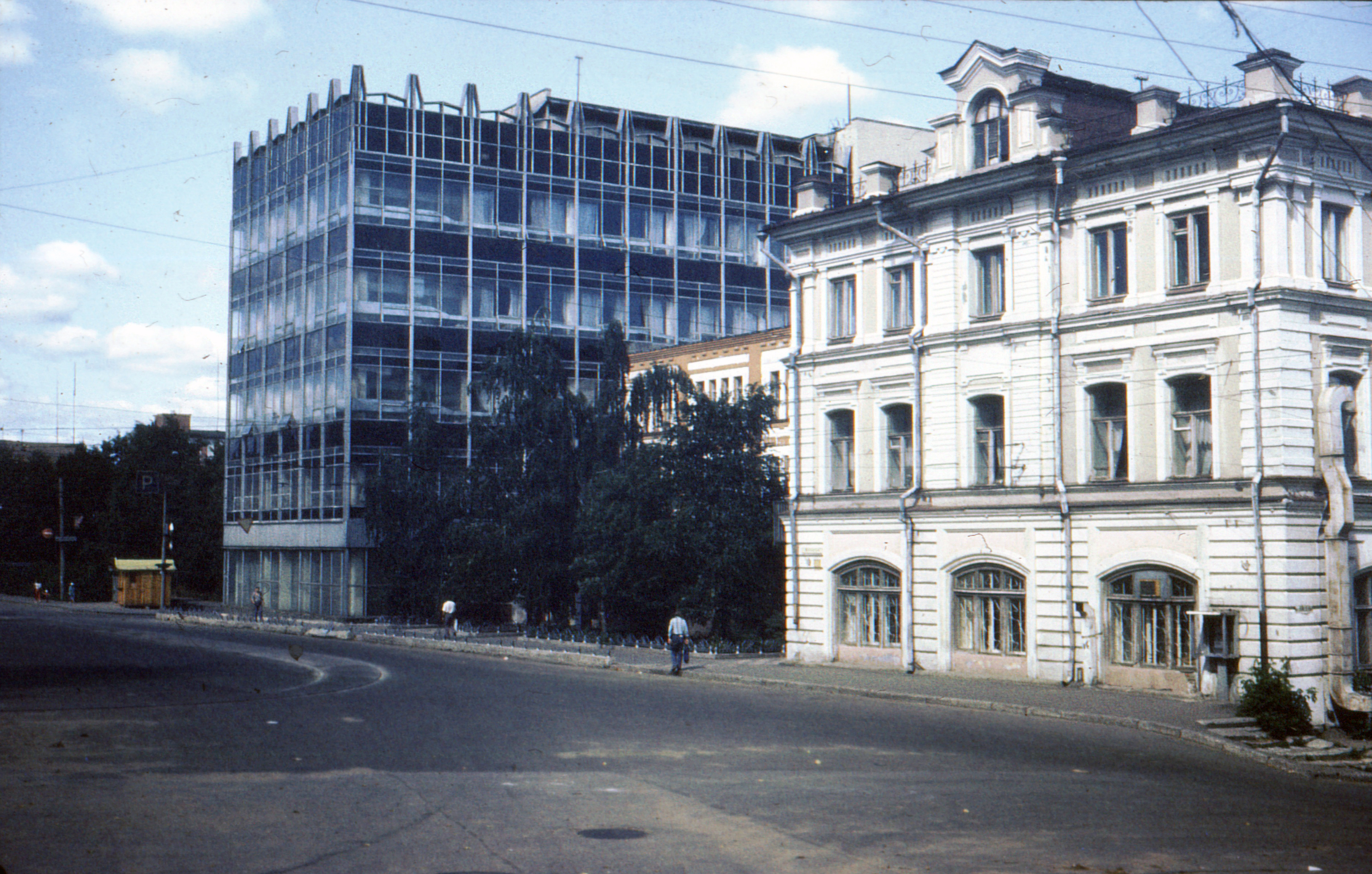
Gorky City. Mayakovsky Street. 1985

After the October Revolution of 1917 and the coming to power of the Bolsheviks, the street was renamed Kooperativnaya in 1924, and in 1940 in Mayakovsky Street ("Mayakovka" among the people). During the struggle with religion, the churches of Cosmas and Damian, the Church of St. Nicholas and the Church of the Life-Giving Trinity were destroyed. However, the two churches survived.

The Church of St. John the Baptist was not destroyed in the early years of the mass demolition of temples. Then it was rebuilt several times – it lost all the domes and the bell tower.

The Nativity Church was supposed to be destroyed, but it was preserved, thanks to the abbot of the church, Father Sergiy Veysov. He collected many photographs and documents confirming the historical value of the temple for the Soviet Union and read many lectures in the offices of the Ministry of Culture on the cultural significance of the Stroganov Baroque. During the World War II, a pharmacy warehouse was located in the church. The iconostasis was saved. Later, a museum of religion and atheism was opened in the temple, which was located there until 1993.

=== Current Russia ===
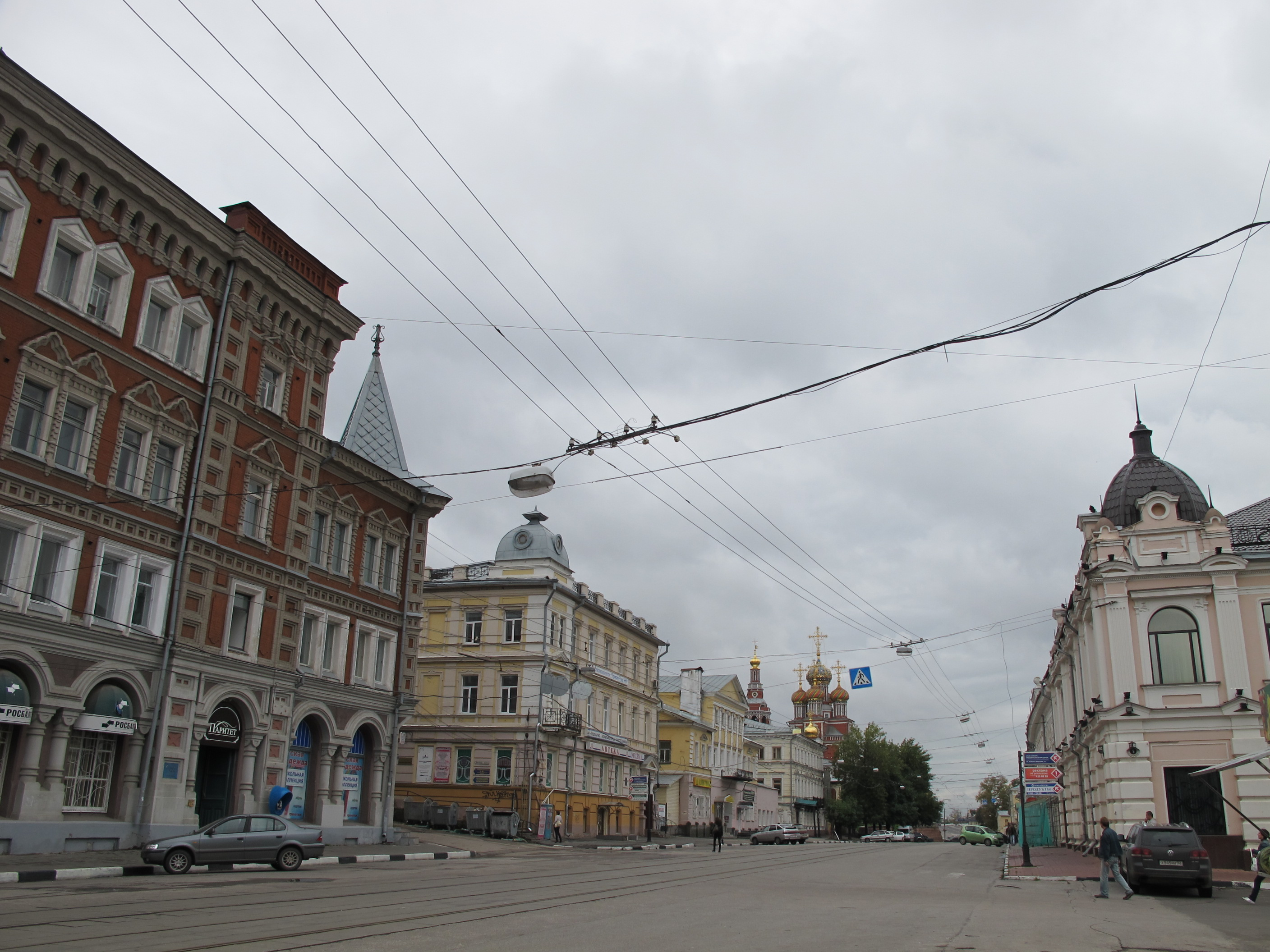
Rozhdestvenskaya Street before the reconstruction of 2012

Rozhdestvenskaya street seen from tram (2008)

After the dissolution of the Soviet Union, the street returned its historic name – Rozhdestvenskaya (Nativity). During the crisis of the 1990s, there was no proper care behind the street and it lost its historical appearance, as many houses were filled with advertising banners. Many houses from old age began to crumble plaster and stucco. On the roofs of some of them trees grew. The situation changed in 2012, when the street began to reconstruct. The pedestrian part of the street was paved with paving stones, and the tram line was reduced to Annunciation Square (not to be confused with Minin Square, which wore this name until 1917) in 2010, due to the closure of the tram on Kanavinsky Bridge. In 2012, one of the two tram tracks was removed and the movement of trams was reversible. The storm sewers were replaced, new lampposts were installed and the facades of the houses were restored.

== Attractions ==
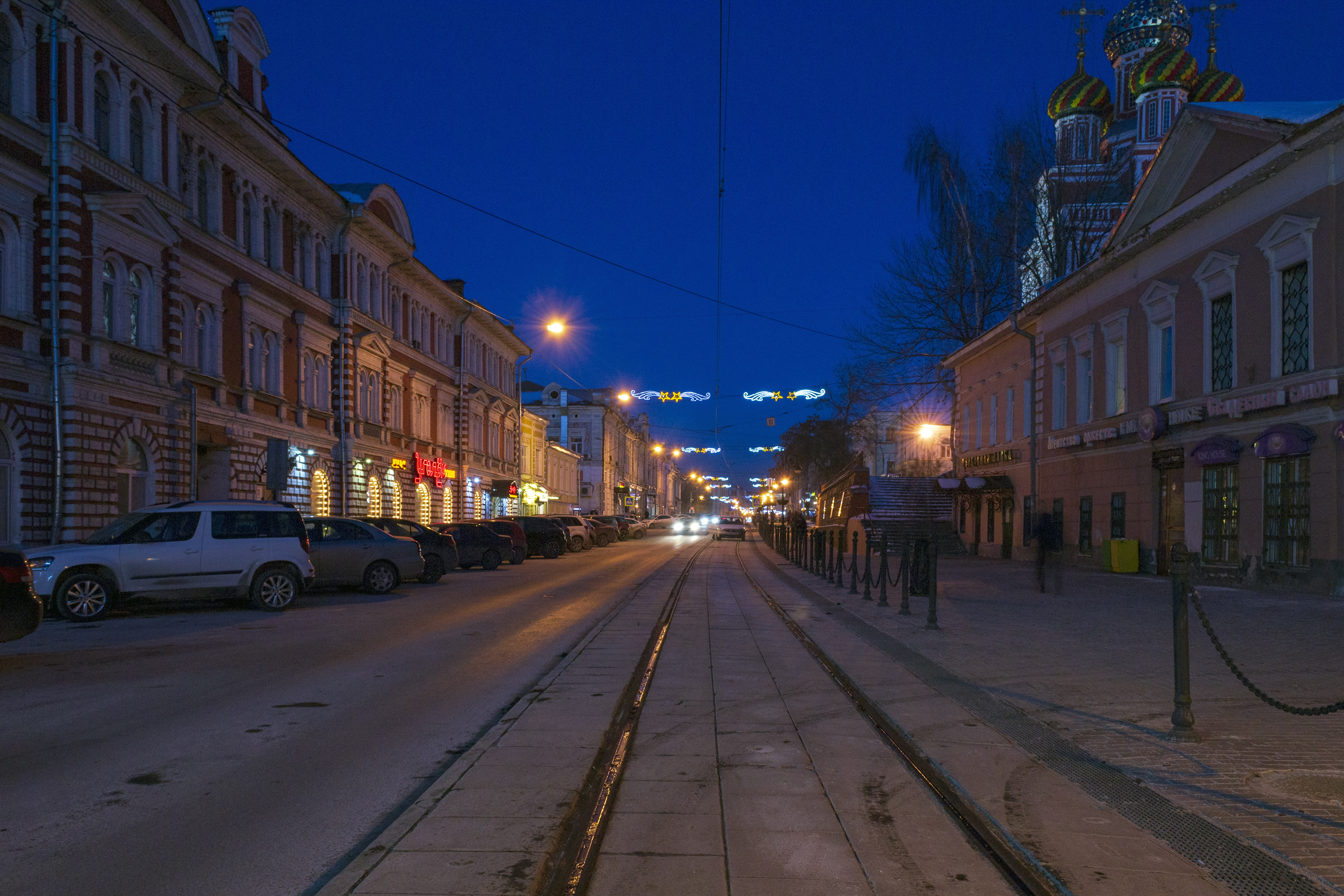
Rozhdestvenskaya Street at night. 2018

- Bugrov Homeless Shelter (2 Rozhdestvenskaya St.). In this house the events of the story "The Lower Depths" by Maxim Gorky.
- Bugrov Revenue house, where Volzhsko-Kamsky Bank was located (27 Rozhdestvenskaya St.).

=== The temples ===
On the street were six temples. Starting from the Kremlin:

- Church of St. John the Baptist (architectural ensemble consisting of a temple and two chapels: "Spasskaya" (at the altar of the church) and "Tsarskaya" (to the left of the church's porch)). Saved.
- Church of St. Nicholas the Wonderworker Lycian "at the Marketplace" (now in its place is the "Myravey" business center). Destroyed.
- Church of the Life-Giving Trinity (Vakhitov lane). Destroyed.
- 2 churches of Saints Cosmas and Damian: old and new (the current Markina Square). Both are destroyed.
- Church of the Nativity of the Blessed Virgin Mary (simply known as Stroganov Church). Saved.
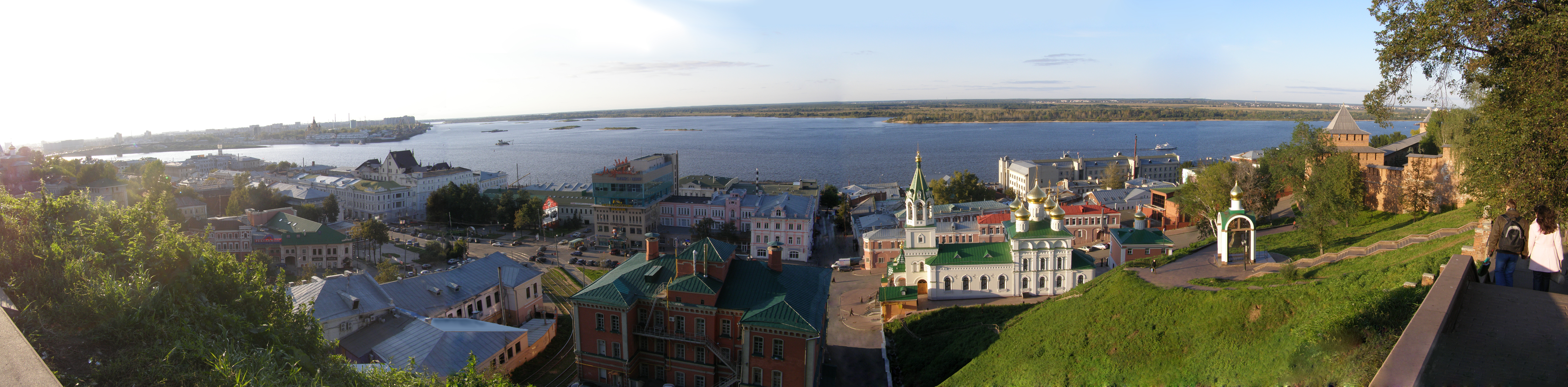
View of the eastern part of the Rozhdestvenskaya street from the Kremlin Hill

== Literature ==
- Olga Naumova. 100 biographies of houses in Nizhny Novgorod: Each house has its own destiny. – 2nd edition: Kvarts, 2008. – pp. 150–163. — ISBN 978-5-903581-04-7.
- Svyatoslav Agafonov. Gorky. Balakhna. Makaryev: Architectural and artistic monuments of ancient Volga cities of the XIII-XX centuries. — 2nd edition – Iskusstvo, 1987. – P. 183-207.
