= Marya Yakovlevna Stroganova =

Russian courtier

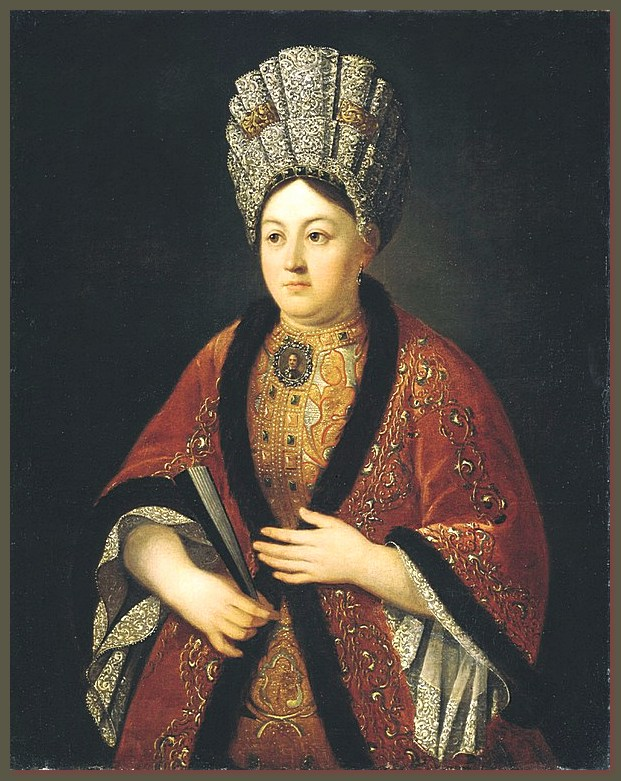
- Born: Ма́рья Я́ковлевна Новоси́льцева; 20 July 1677
- Died: 9 November 1734 (aged 57)
- Buried: Church of St. Nicholas in Kotelniki
- Noble family: Novosiltseva
- Spouse: Grigory Dmitriyevich Stroganov
- Issue: Nikolai Grigorievich; Alexander Grigorievich; Sergei Grigorievich; Ivan Grigorievich; Maria Grigorievna
- Father: Yakov Zakharyevich Novosiltsov

Marya Yakovlevna Stroganova (1678–1734), was a Russian courtier.

She was married to the courtier Grigory Dmitriyevich Stroganov. She was the godchild of Peter the Great and belonged to his circle of favorites. She sometimes took part in his drinking parties.

She was a lady-in-waiting to Catherine I of Russia and then Anna of Russia from 1724 and was a well known figure at court.
