= Vlakhernskoye-Kuzminki =

Former Stroganov and Golitsyn estate in Moscow

Coordinates: 55°41′22″N 37°47′6″E

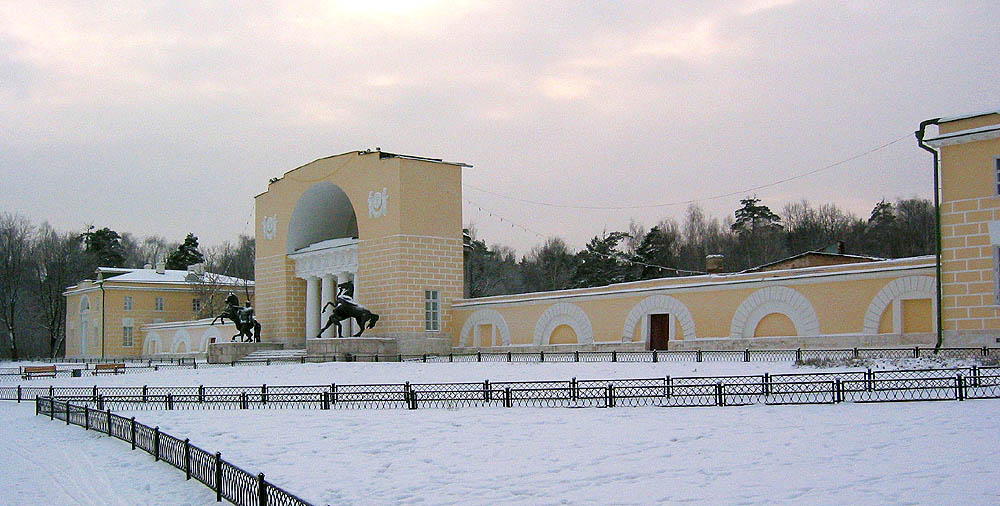
The riding house fronted by Pyotr Klodt's statues of horse tamers.

Vlakhernskoye-Kuzminki is an estate formerly belonging to the Stroganov and Golitsyn families of the Russian nobility. Today, it is incorporated into Kuzminki-Lyublino historical park located in Moscow's Kuzminki District. The estate was named after the Icon of Theotokos Vlakhernskaya, a replica of which was kept in the estate church.

== History ==
In 1702 Peter the Great granted the estate to Grigori Stroganov. No buildings were erected on the property until after the death of the first owner in 1714. The new owner, Alexander Stroganov, began construction on the estate; in 1754 the estate passed to his widow. After the marriage of her daughter Anna in 1757 to Prince Mikhail M. Golitsyn (1731–1804), the property passed to the Golitsyn family.

=== After the Revolution ===
In 1917 the mansion was nationalized and given to the Institute of experimental veterinary medicine, which later became the All-Union Scientific Research Institute of Experimental Veterinary Medicine in Petrograd and occupied the building until 2001. During the following decades, Kuzminki fell into disrepair and decay. Many buildings were rebuilt and converted into laboratories, residential and administrative buildings.

Today, it is the largest manor house in Moscow by number of buildings (currently over 20), a considerable part of which are newly built ones.

== The Manor house ==
The manor house was rebuilt several times in the second half of the 18th century. Side wings are connected with the main house by two semi-circular galleries. In the 1830s, the entrance of the manor court was decorated with iron candelabra and griffins, designed by J. Colombo. The manor house and its western wing burned down in 1916.

== The Estate Church ==
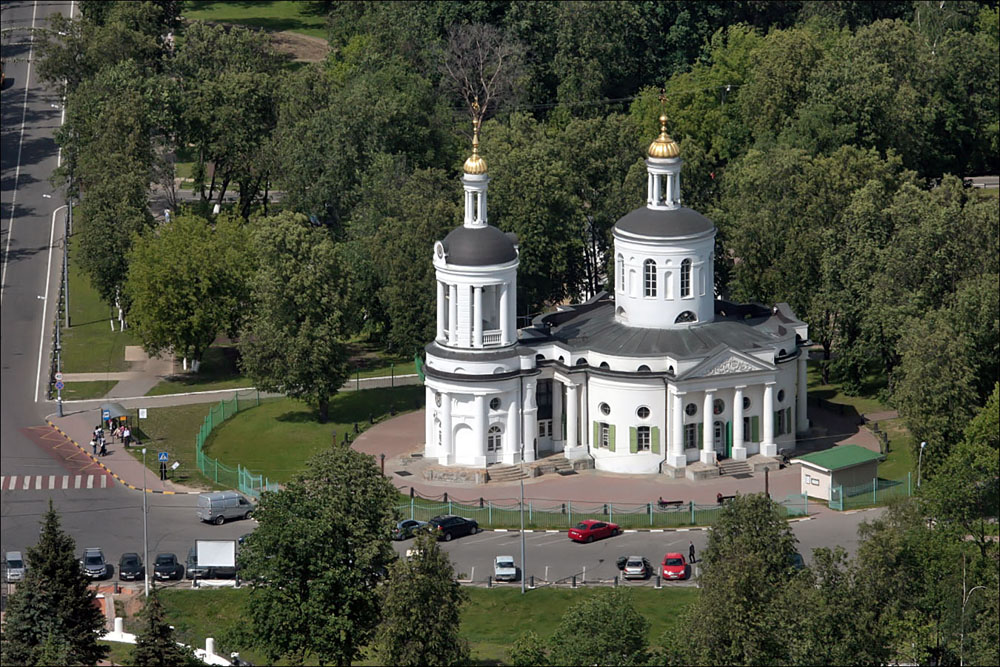
The Church of the Blachernitissa today.

The church of the Blachernae Icon of Theotokos is located at the heart of the estate.

The church was closed in 1929 by order of the government and many of its ceremonial items were removed, the bell tower was also ruined and the building itself was badly damaged. The church and the bell tower were restored in 1995 under the guidance of Yelena Vorontsova.

== The Riding Court ==
The Riding Court on the left bank of the Upper Pond near the dam was built in 1805. It was rebuilt in 1823 by architect Domenico Gilardi.

In 1978, the building of the Music Pavilion burnt down and the other premises of the Riding Court were abandoned. In the early 2000s, the entire complex of the courtyard was restored.

On 28 January 2019, a wooden ceiling collapsed in the Riding Court premises.

== Views of Kuzminki by J.Rauch, 1820s - 1840s ==
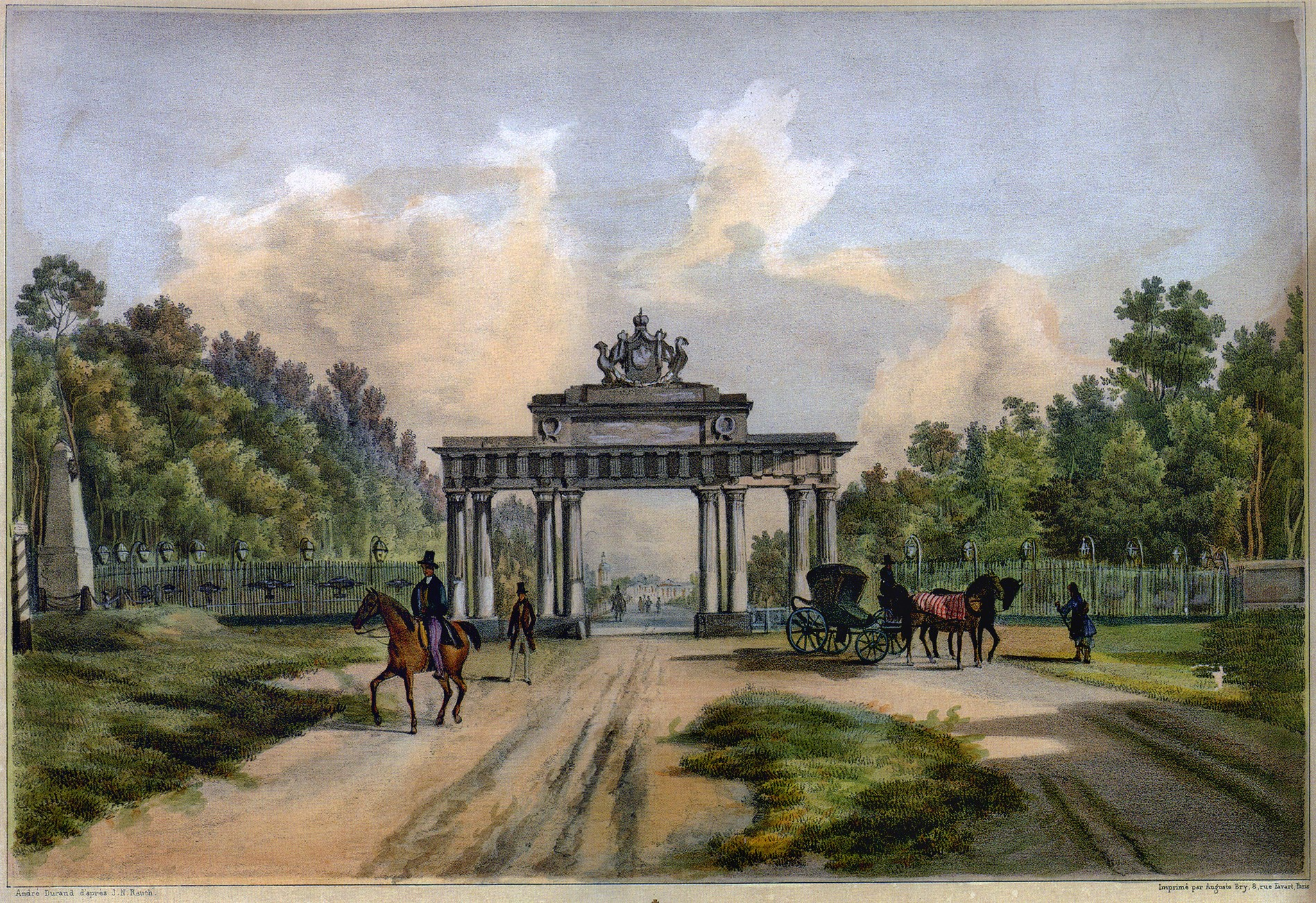
Cast-iron gates at the entrance of the Estate

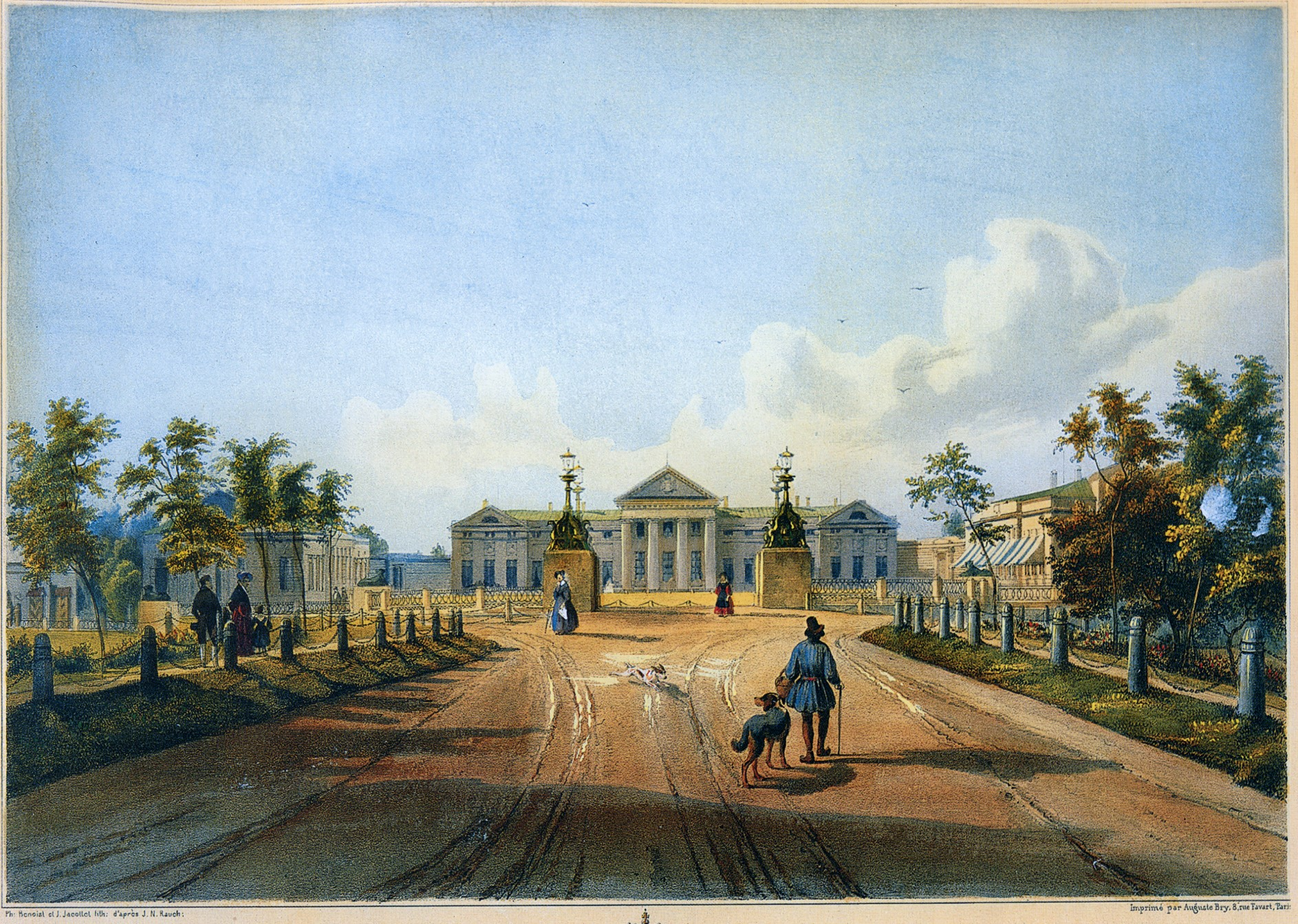
The linden avenue and the manor house

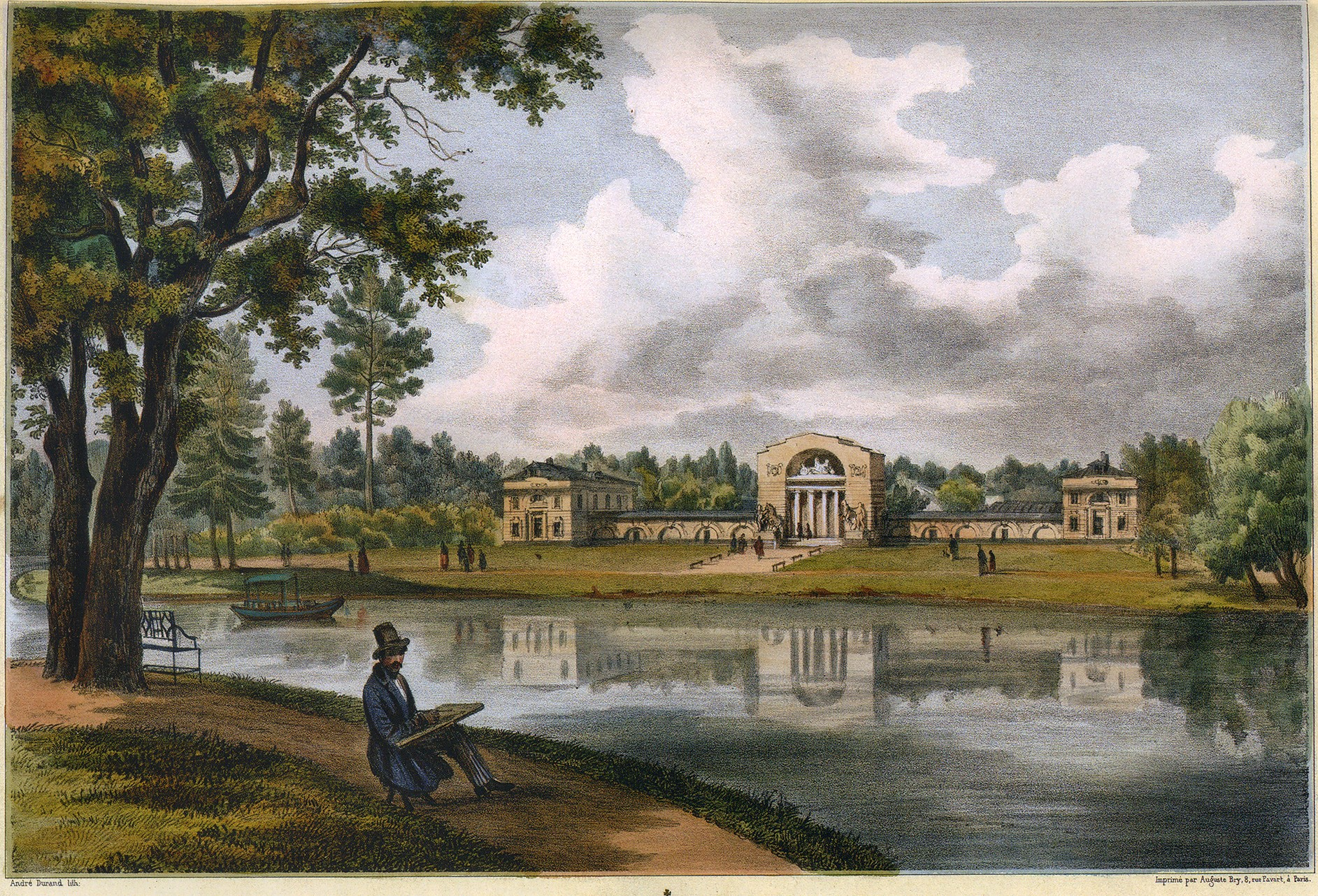
The Riding Court, by architect Domenico Gilardi

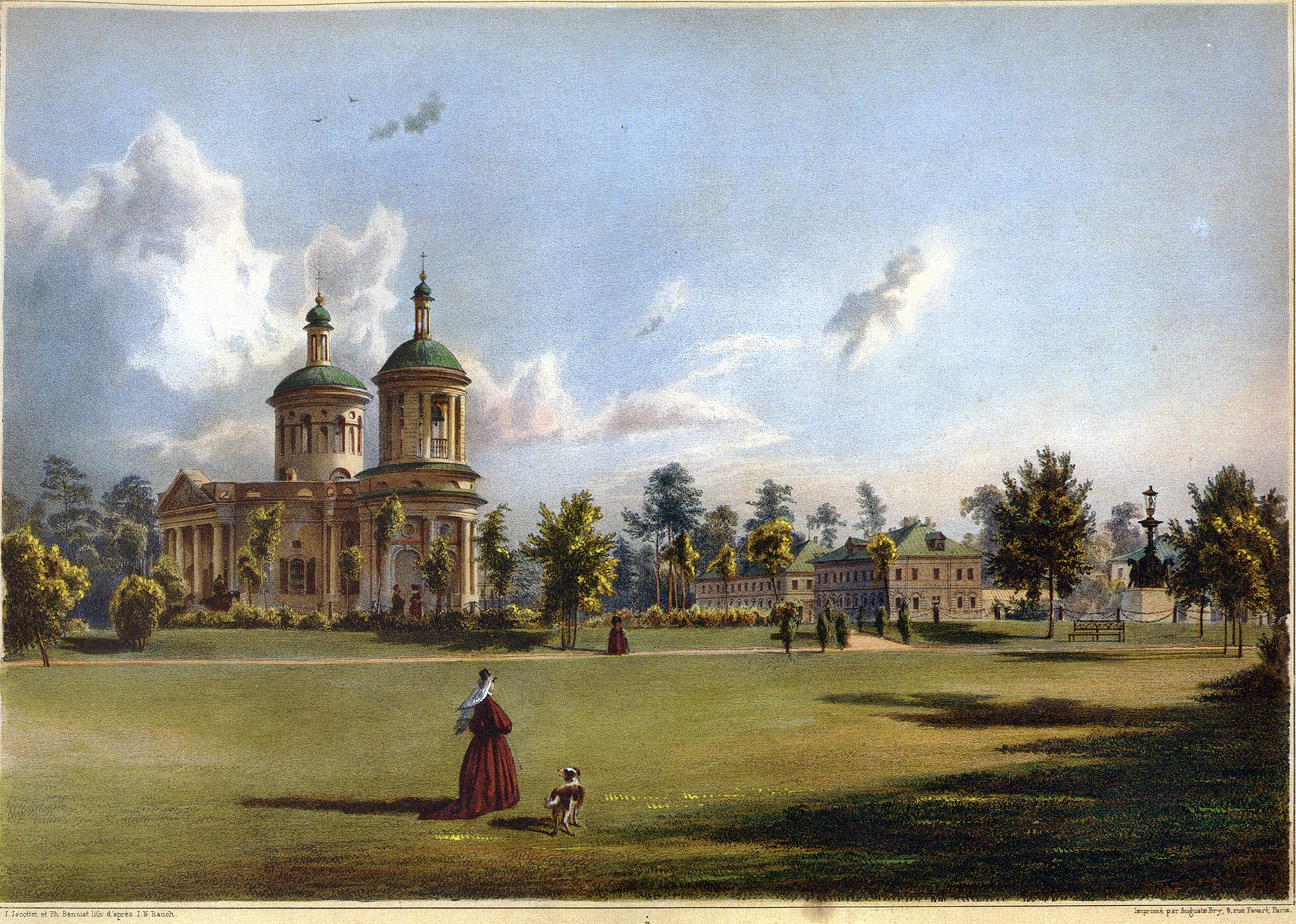
The Church of the Blachernitissa

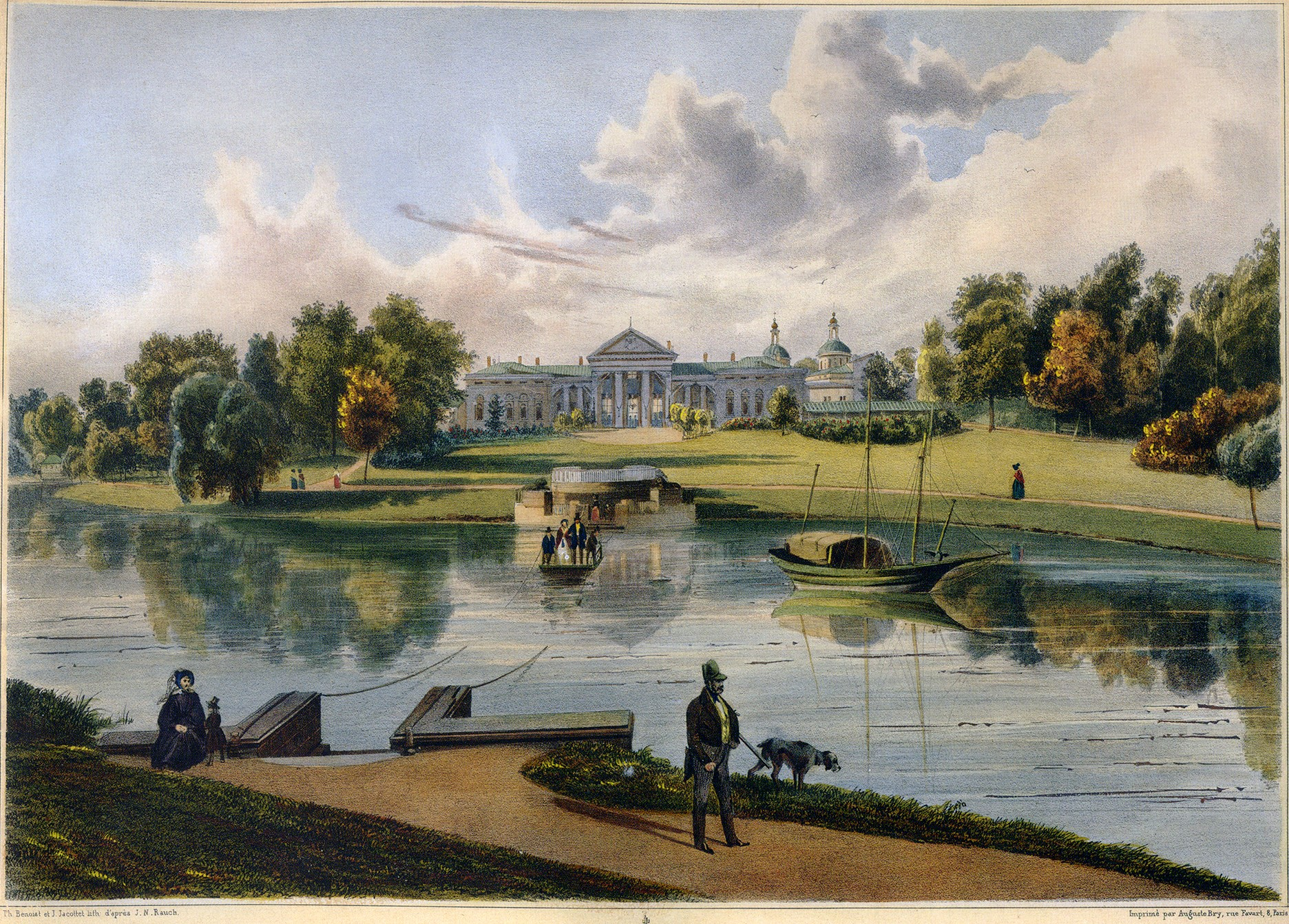
Palace. South facade

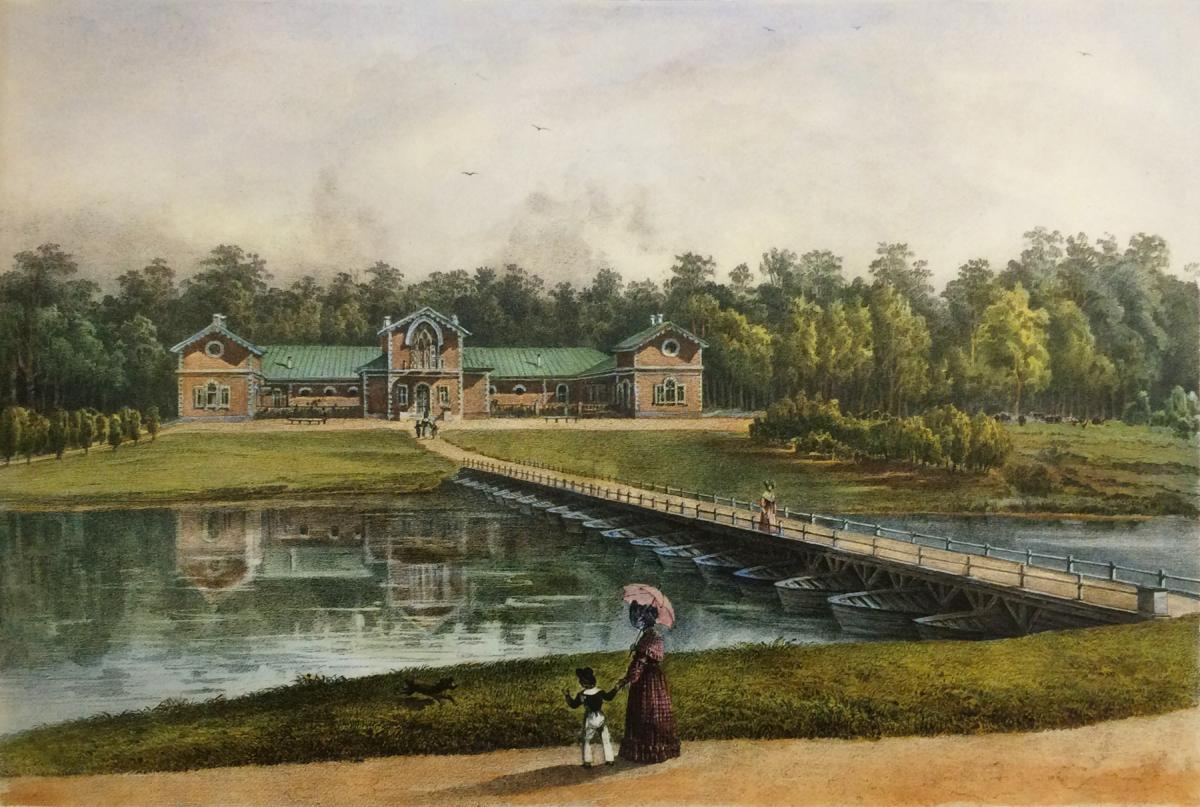
The estate farm and bridge

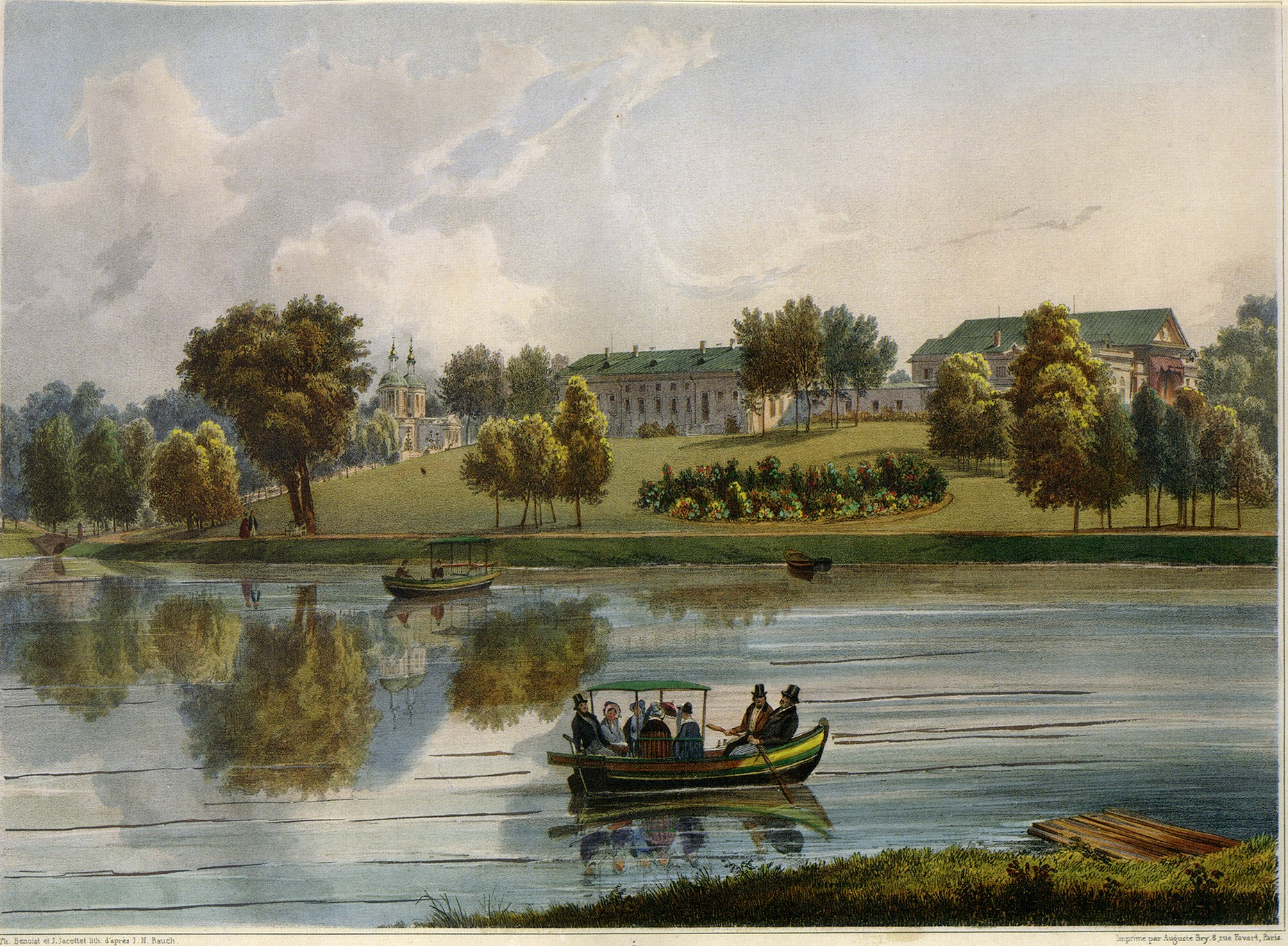
The Park and pond

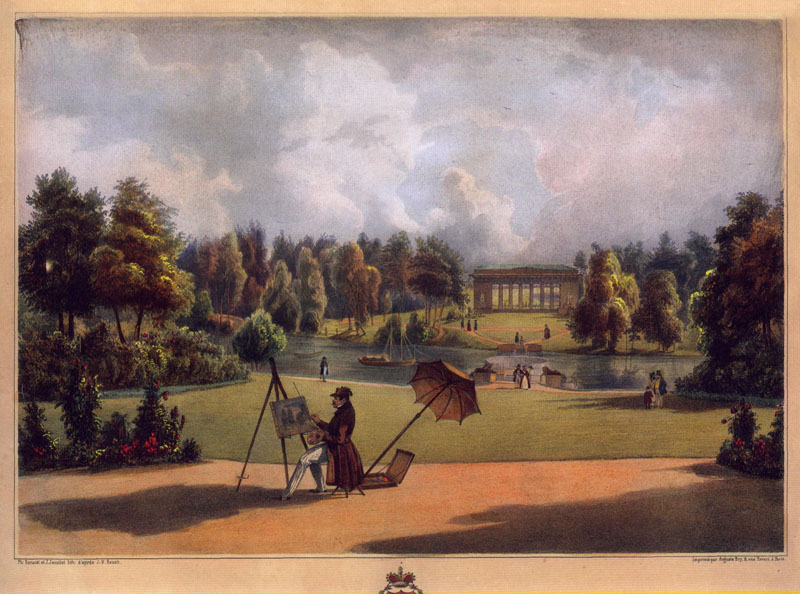

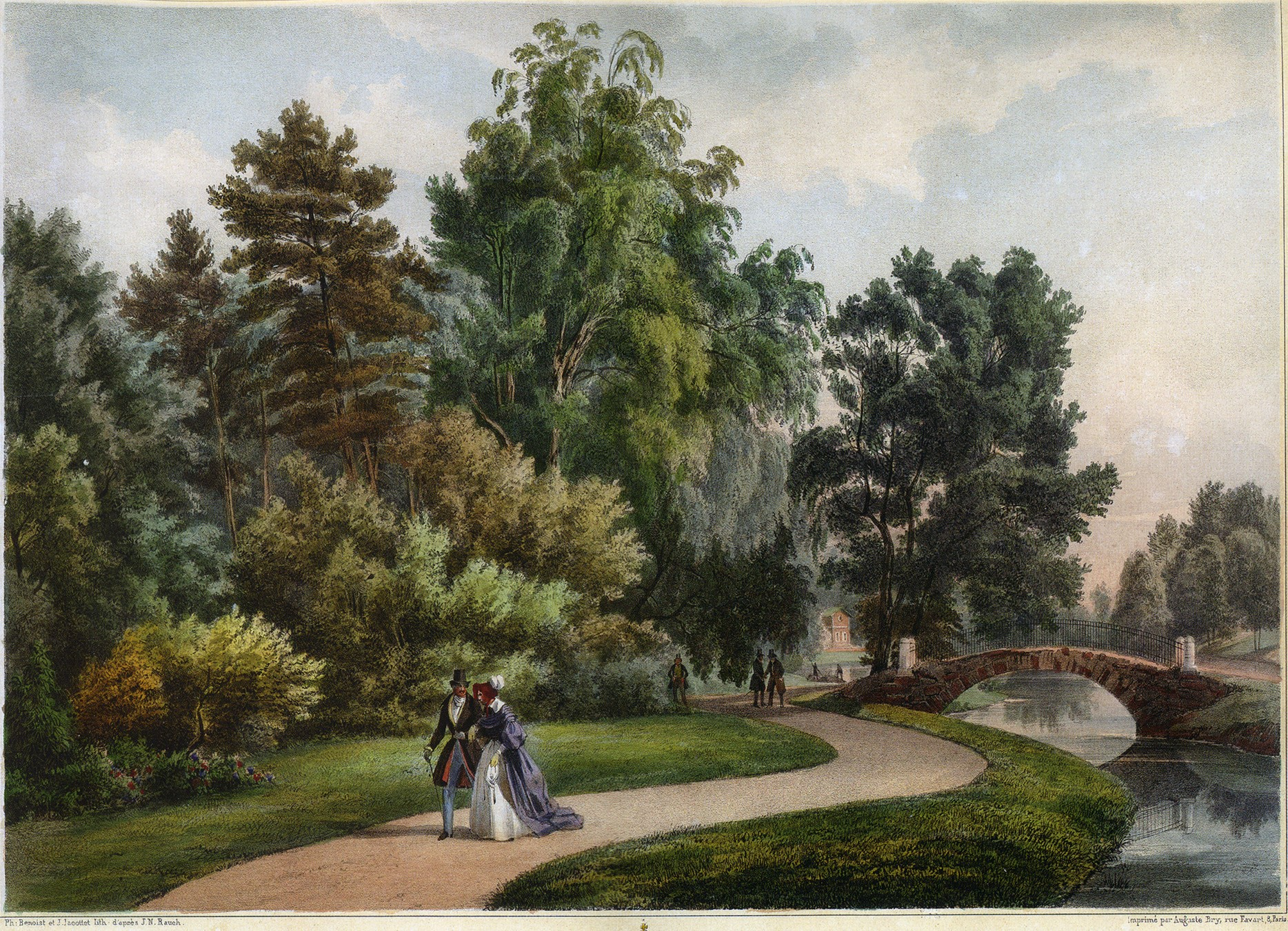

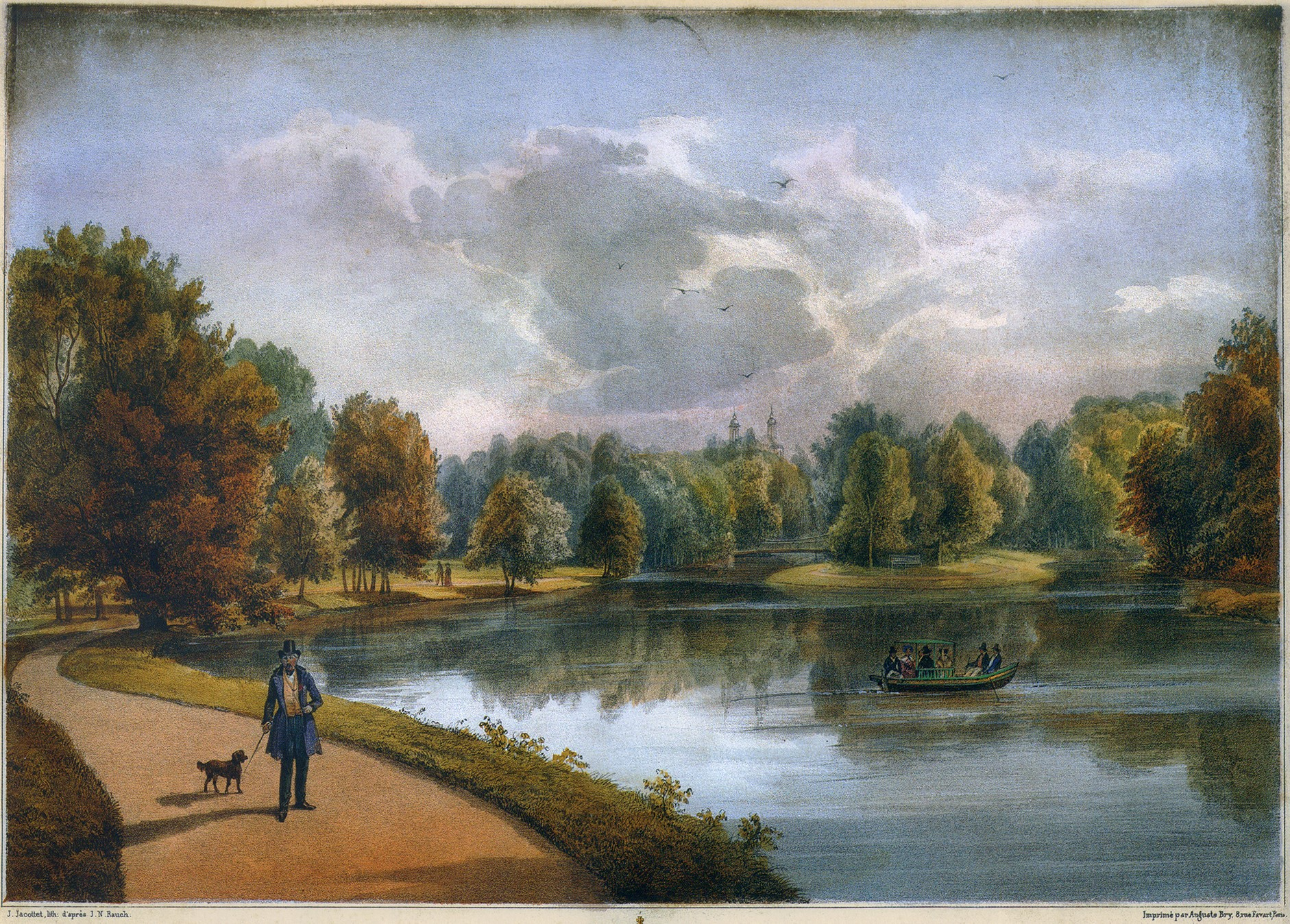

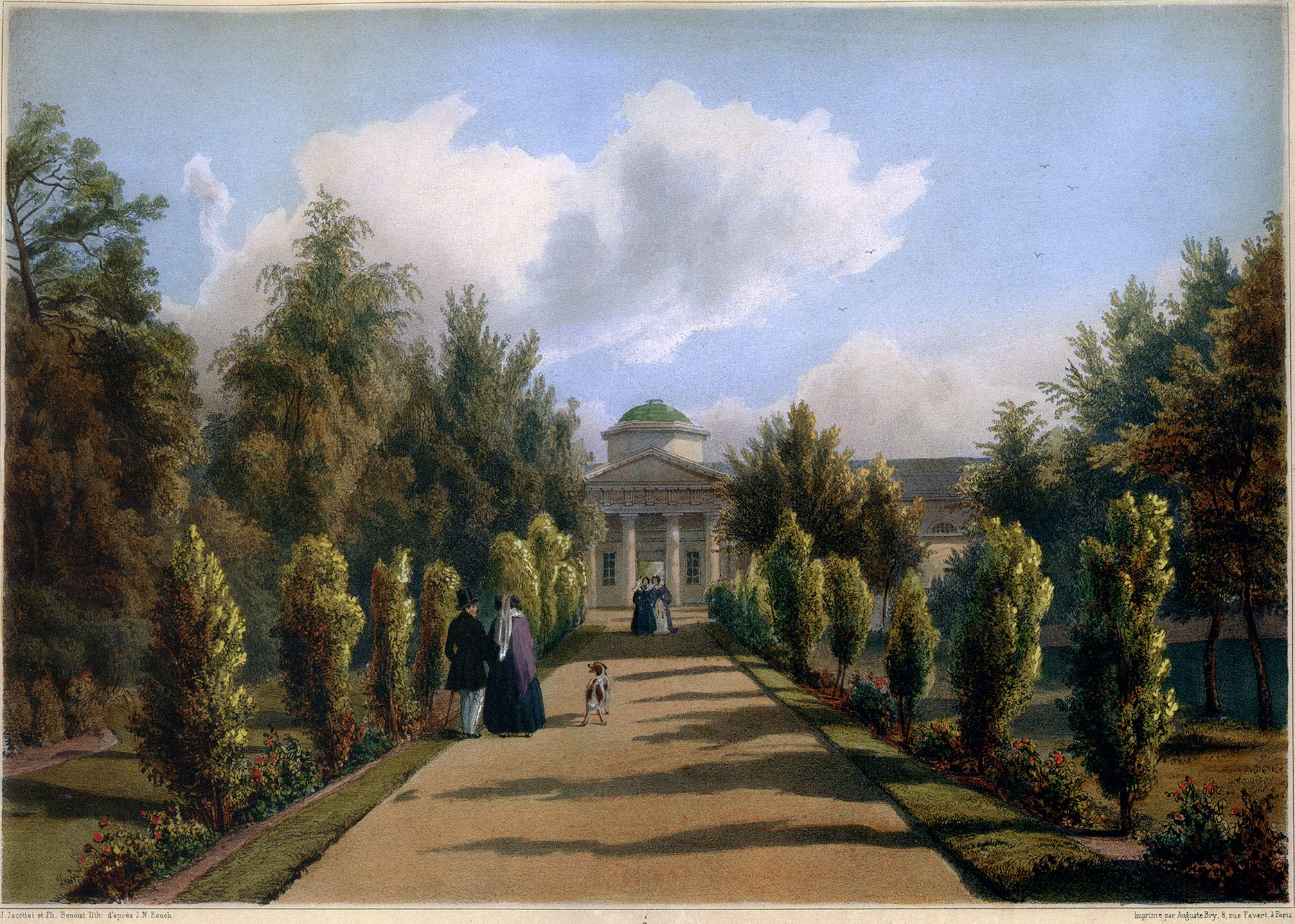
The greenhouse

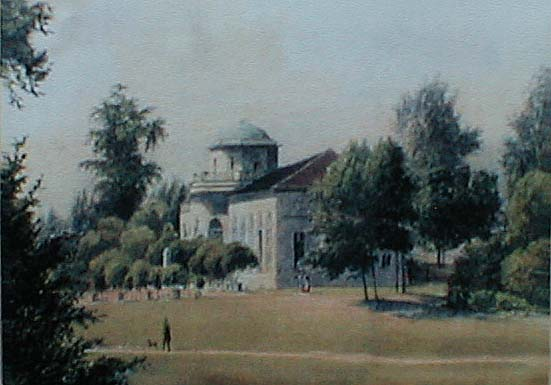

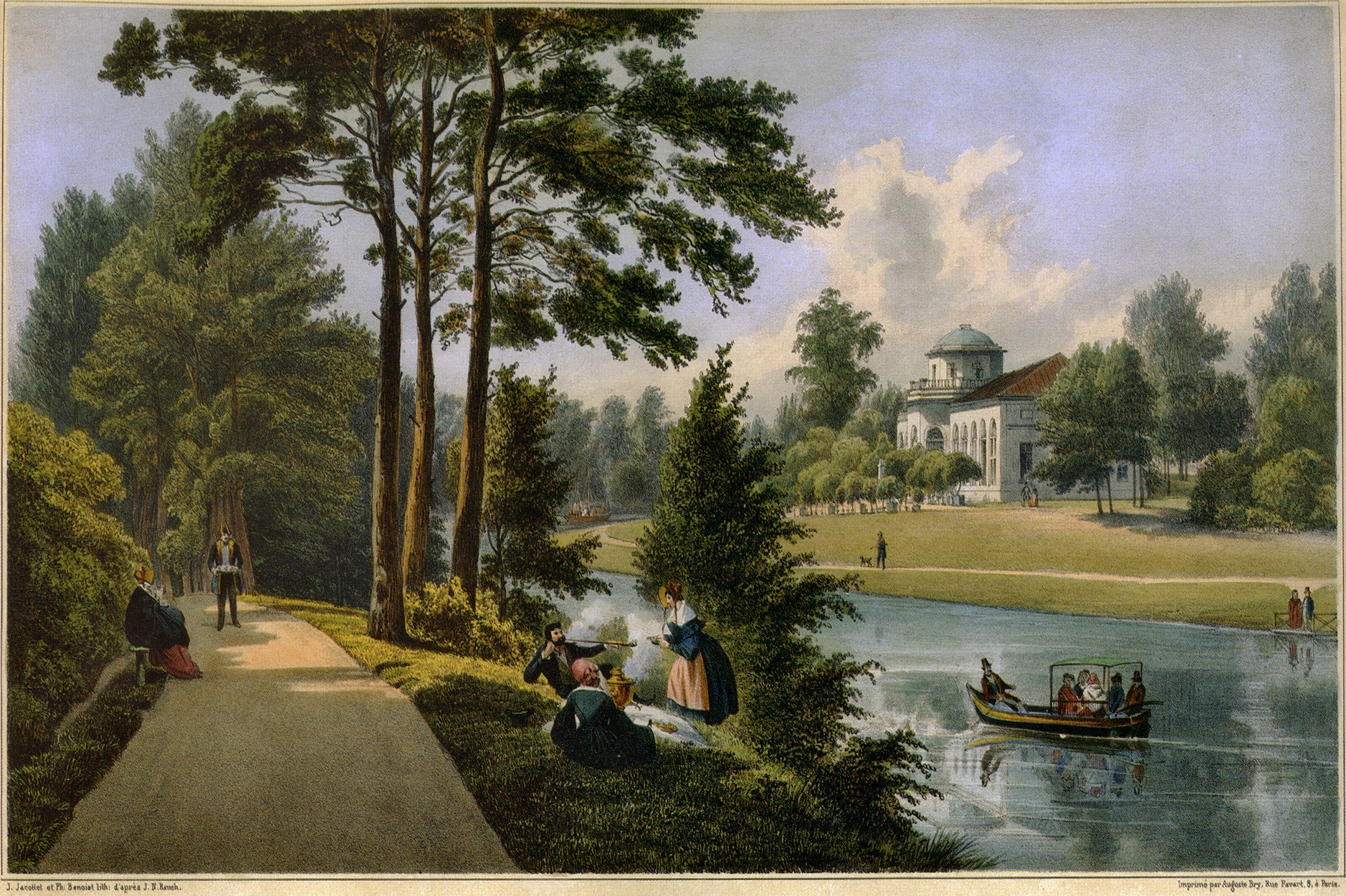

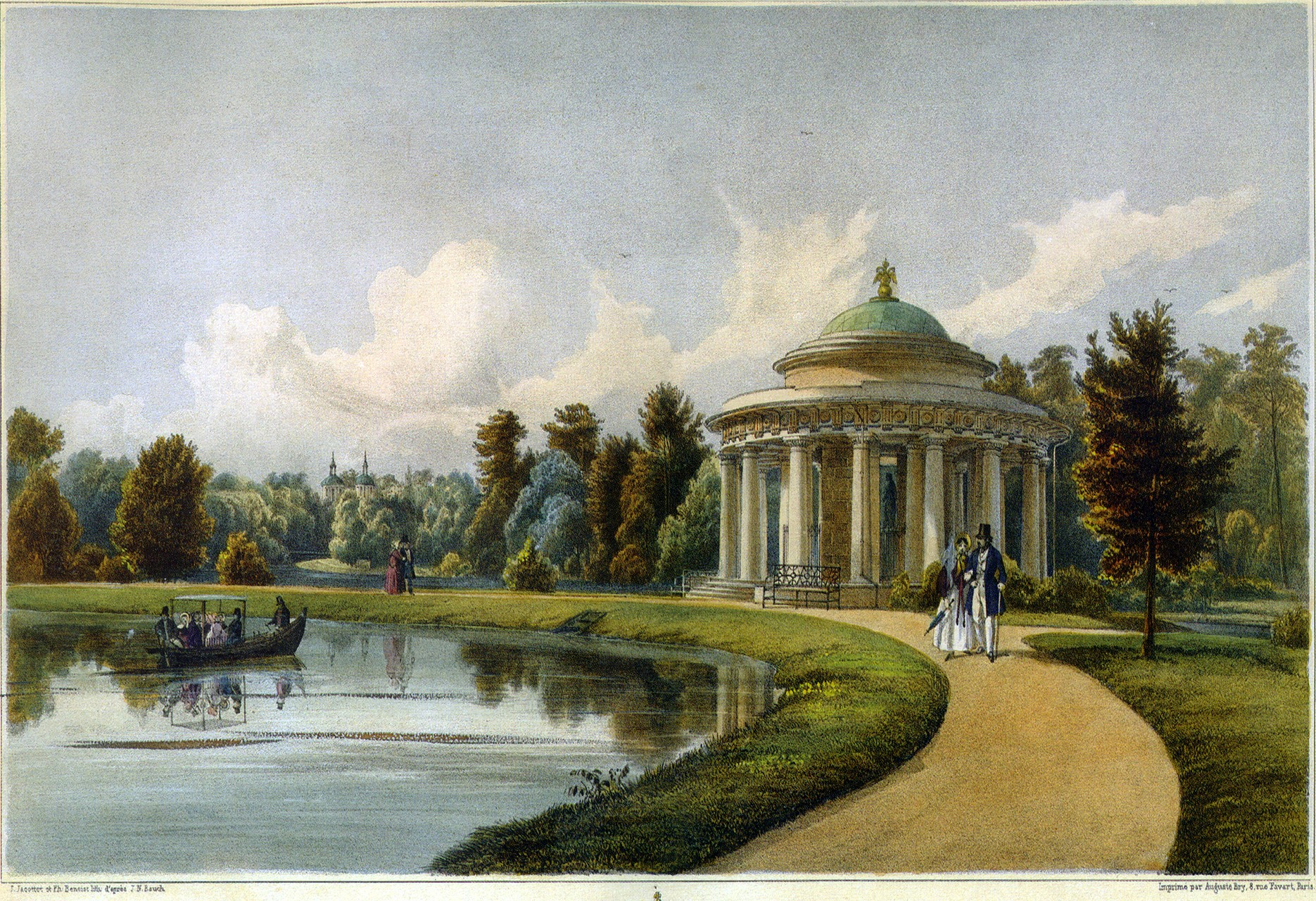
The Pavilion of Empress Maria Feodorovna

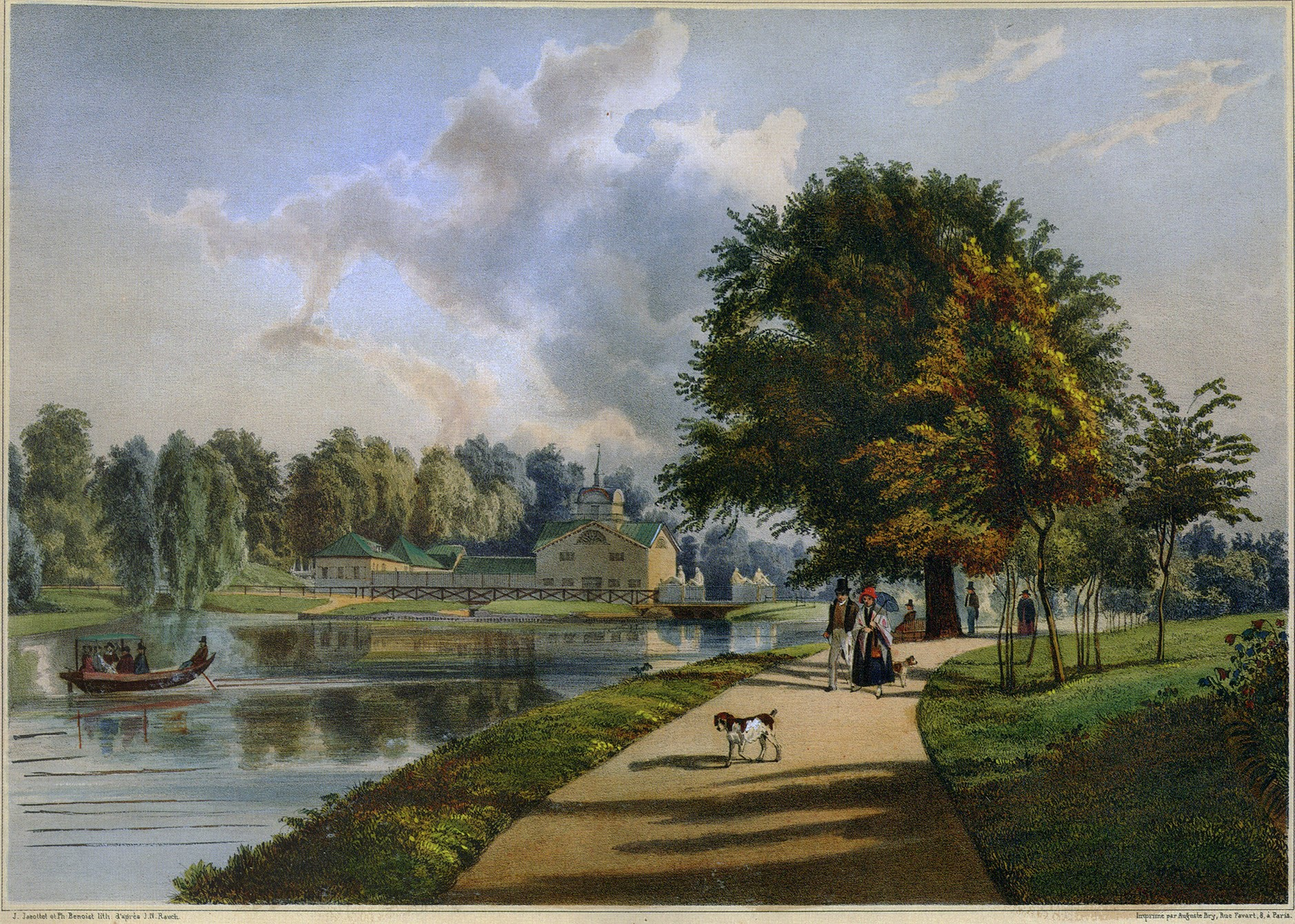
Mill

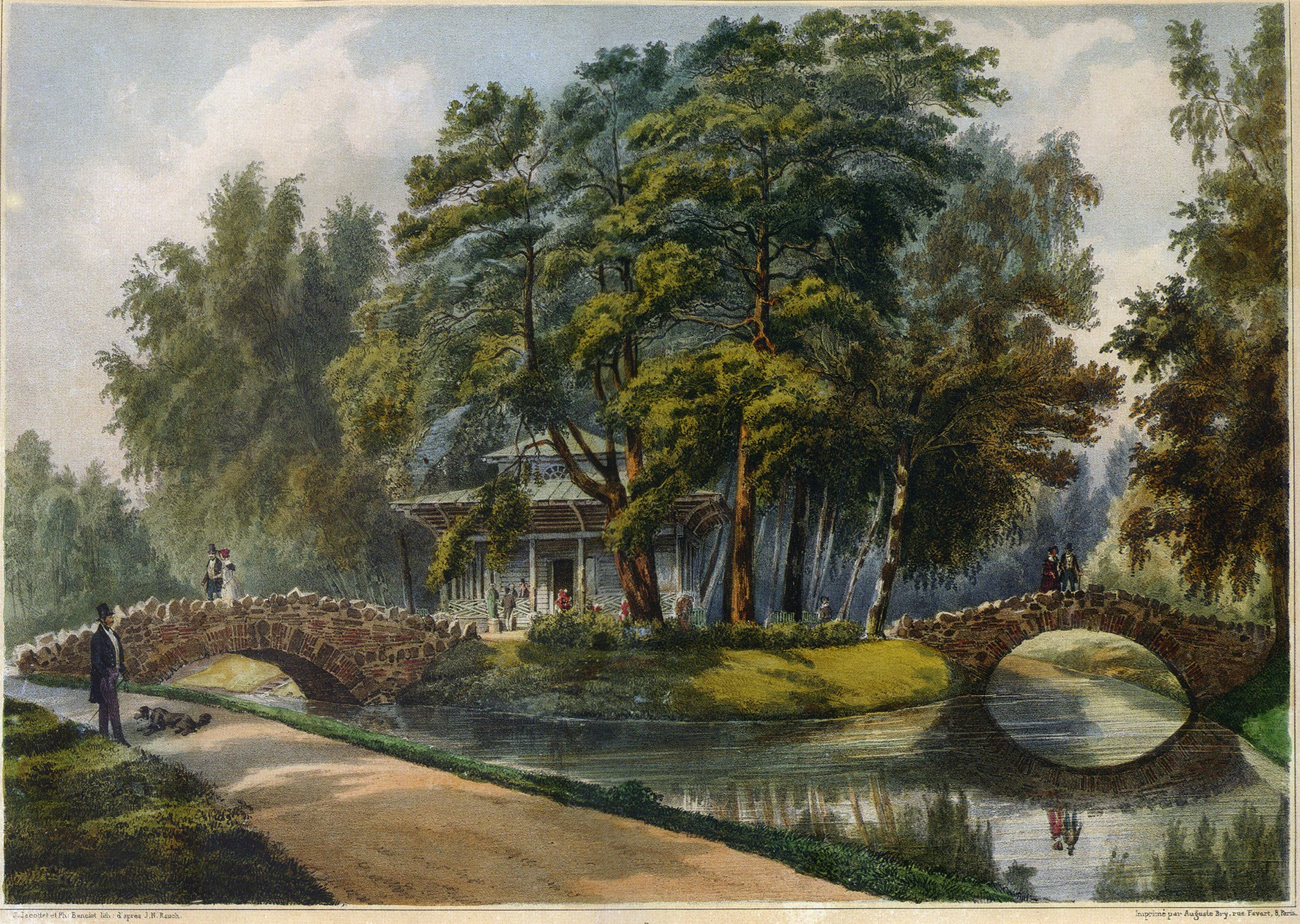
The «Bronze House» Pavilion

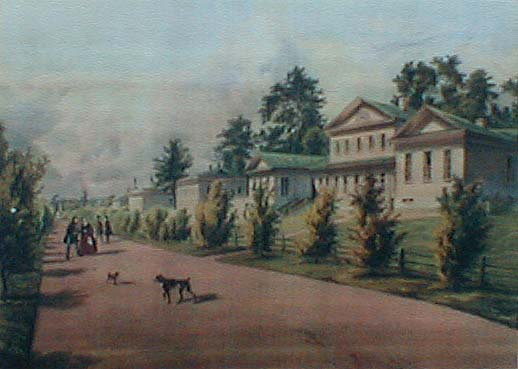
The servants' village, and the hospital

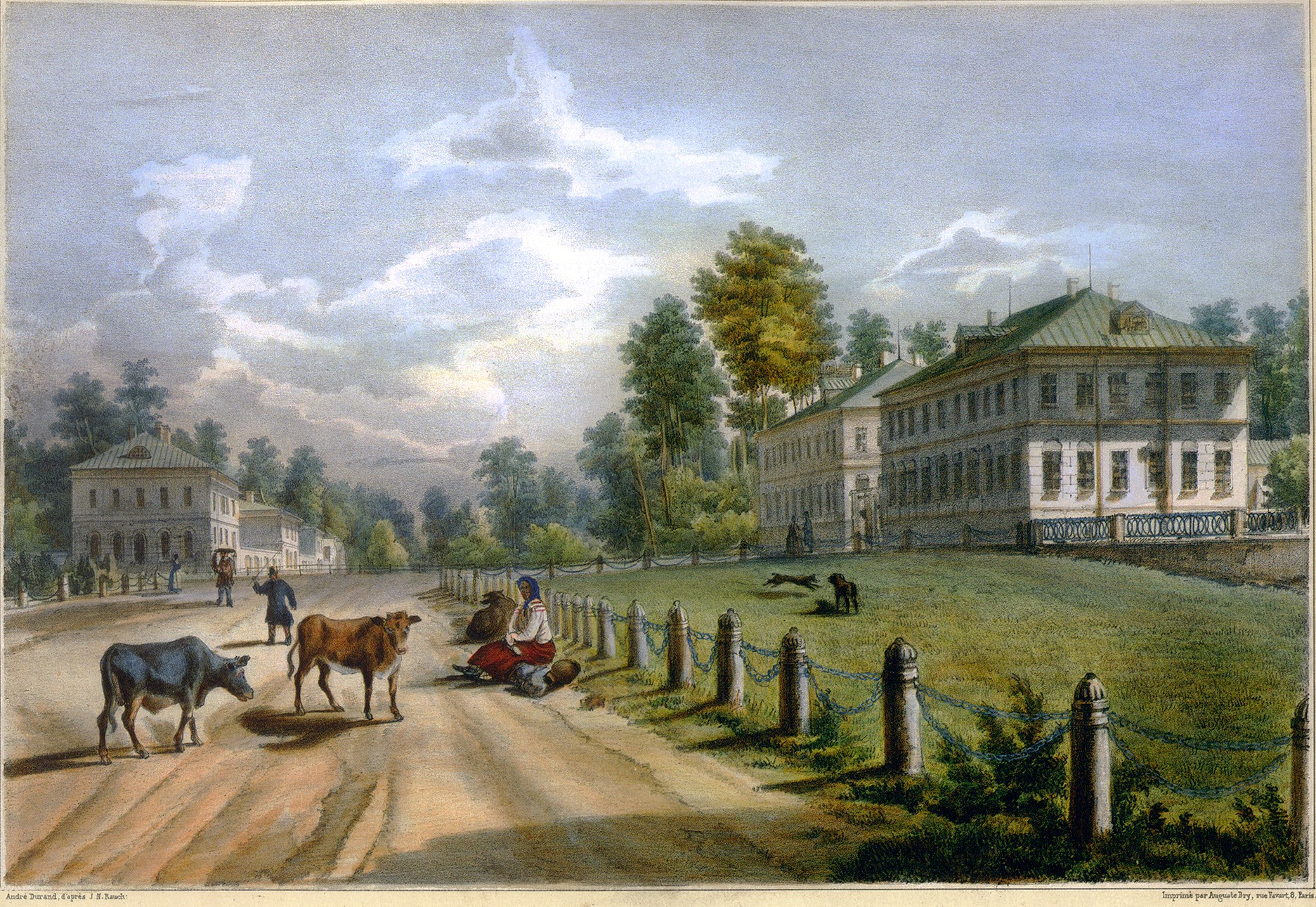
