= Grigory Dmitriyevich Stroganov =

Russian landowner and statesman

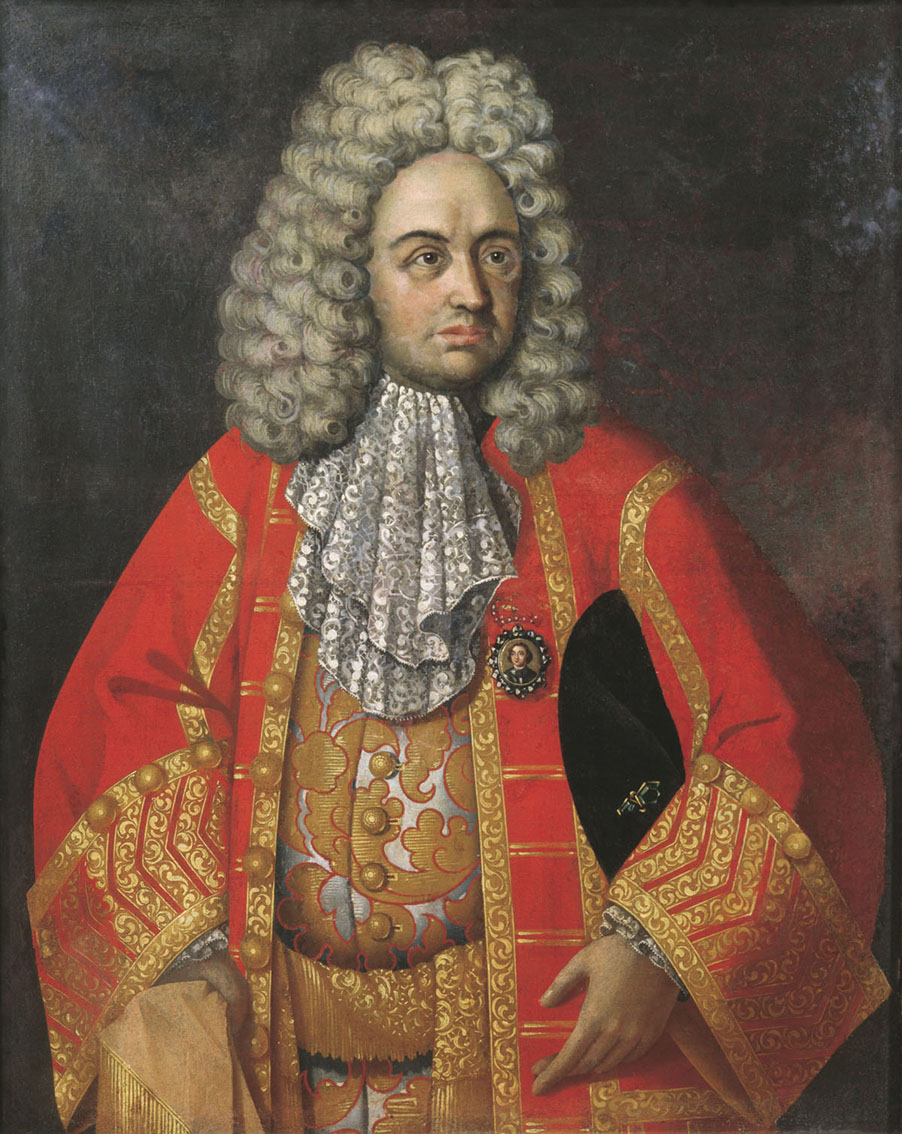
Portrait of Grigory Stroganov by Roman Nikitin

Grigory Dmitriyevich Stroganov (Russian: Григорий Дмитриевич Строганов) (25 January 1656 – 21 November 1715) was a Russian landowner and statesman, the most notable member of the prominent Stroganov family in the late 17th century-early 18th century, a strong supporter of the reforms and initiatives of Peter the Great. The surname is also transcribed as Stroganoff. Beef Stroganoff is named after this family.

== Early life ==
Grigory Stroganov was the only son of Dmitri Andreyevich Stroganov. His name first appears in the public record in 1672, when he visited Moscow with gifts for Tsar Alexei Mikhailovich on the occasion of the birth of Tsarevich Peter.

== Career ==
Stroganov's father died in 1673, following which the Tsar issued a gramota confirming Grigory's inheritance of one third of the Stroganov family fortune. When the heirs of Yakov Stroganov, the senior branch of the family, died off in 1681, Grigory inherited another one third of the Stroganov lands. The last third, owned by the wife of Fyodor Petrovich Stroganov, passed to him on 18 January 1686.

According to the accounting of Fyodor Volegov (d. 1856), this consolidation increased Grigory Stroganov's personal holdings dramatically, to more than ten million desiatinas of land (103,000 square kilometers) with more than 200 villages and 15,000 adult male serfs. This figure does not include his estates in Moscow (e.g. Vlakhernskoye-Kuzminki), Nizhny Novgorod and Solvychegodsk. Grigory Stroganov was the largest Russian landowner after the tsar.

Beginning in 1682 he regularly assisted the government in its financial difficulties. He was frequently invited to the court of tsar Alexey Romanov, including invitations to his private dinners. In 1700 Stroganov funded the construction of four military ships built in Voronezh and Astrakhan to Peter the Great for the nascent Imperial Russian Navy. For his services Grigory Stroganov received numerous awards, honorary distinctions and additional lands.

A major factor in Stroganov's power was his saltern enterprise, whose efficiency greatly improved under his management. However, he lost this advantage in 1705, when the state established a salt monopoly.

== Personal life ==
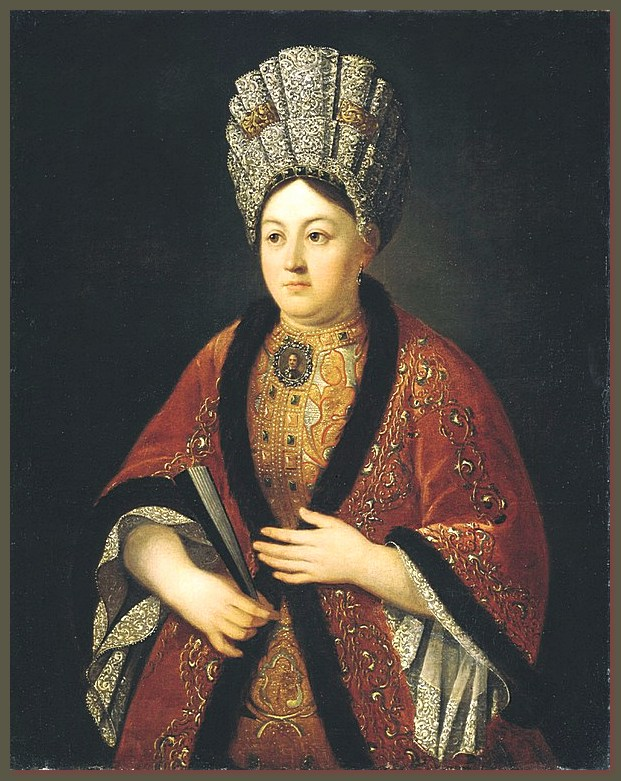
Portrait of his second wife, Marya Yakovlevna Stroganova, after Roman Nikitin

Stroganov was twice married. His first marriage was in 1673 to Princess Vassa Meshcherskaya (1654–1693), daughter of the Turin governor Ivan Ivanovich Meshchersky. After her death, he married Princess Marya Yakovlevna Stroganova Novosiltseva, sister of the Solikamsk governor Vasily Yakovlevich Novosiltsev, in May 1694. Three children from his second marriage survived to adulthood:

- Alexandr Grigoryevich Stroganov (1698–1754), who married three times: Tatyana Vasilievna Sheremeteva, daughter of Major General Vasily Petrovich Sheremetev, in 1723, Elena Vasilievna Dmitrieva-Mamónova, daughter of Rear Admiral Vasily Dmítriev-Mamónov, in 1734, and Maria Artemyevna Zagryazhskaya (Islenyeva), daughter of General-in-Chief Artemy Grigoryevich Zagryazhsky, in 1746.
- Nikolai Grigoryevich Stroganov (1700–1758), who Praskovya Ivanovna Buturlina in 1726.
- Sergei Grigoryevich Stroganov (1707–1756), who married Sofia Kirillovna Naryshkina, the daughter of the Governor-General of Moscow Kirill Alekseevich Naryshkin.

Stroganov died on 21 November 1715. Grigory's sons were rewarded with the baronial title by Peter the Great in 1722.

== Gallery ==
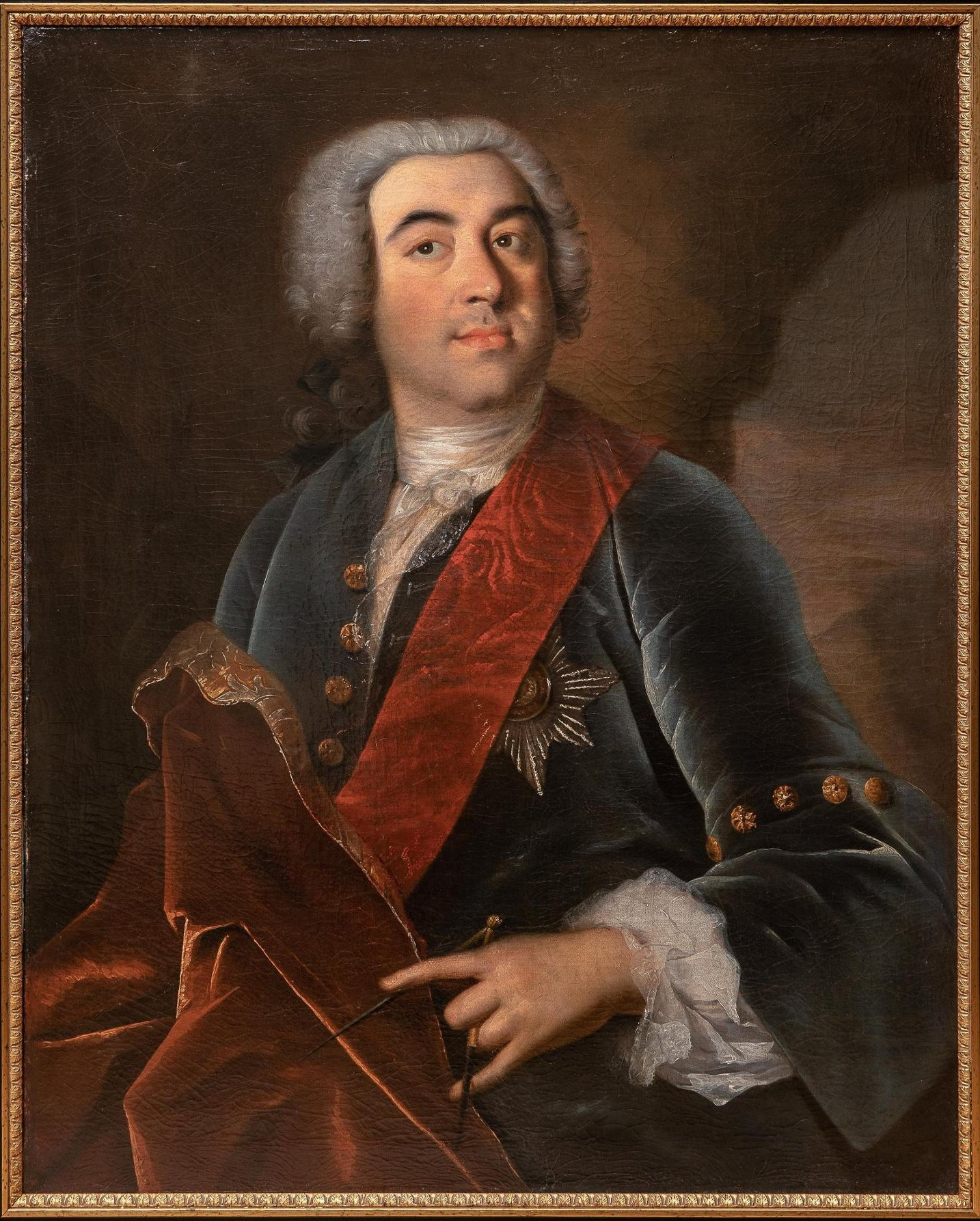
Portrait of his son, Alexandr Stroganov, by Johann Balthasar Frankart, 1730s

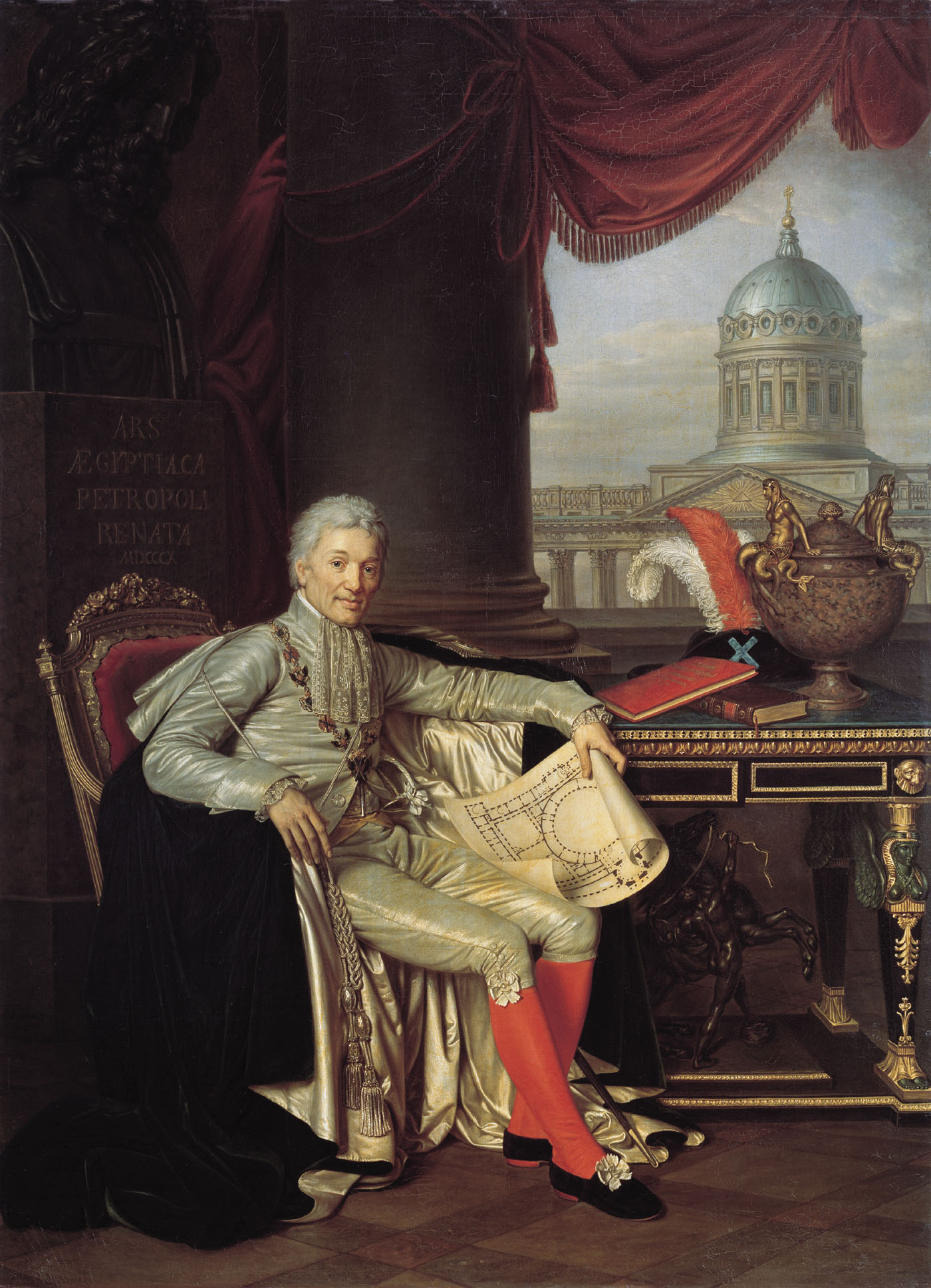
Portrait of his grandson, Alexander Sergeyevich Stroganov, by Alexander Grigoryevich Varnek, 1814
