= List of families included in Velvet Book =

The Velvet Book was an official register of genealogies of Russia's most noble families.

== A ==
- Adashevs (XXXXIV, 289)
- Aksakovs
- Alabyshevs, princes
- Alyonkins, princes (XI, 61)
- Alabyshevs (XI, 60)
- Aleksandrovs
- Aminovs
- Andomskys, princes (XXXI, 245)
- Anichkovs
- Arsenyevs
- Astafyevs

== B ==
- Baranovs, counts.
- Barashevs-Zvenigorodskys, princes (XII, 105)
- Barbashins, princes (VIII, 36)
- Basmanov-Pleshcheevs (XVI, 155)
- Bakhteyarov-Rostovskys, princes (IX, 43)
- Bakhtins, nobles
- Bezzubtsevs
- Belyovskys, princes (XII, 96)
- Beleutovs (XXVIII, 231)
- Belkins (XXXX, 279)
- Belozerskys (XXXI, 243)
- Beloselskys-Belozerskys (XXXI, 244)
- Belye-Obolenskys, princes
- Belskys (Rurikids) and Belskys (Gediminids), princes (IV, 22; XI, 78)
- Berezins, nobles (XXXVI, 270)
- Berezuyskys, princes (XXXIV, 261)
- Birdyukins-Zaitsovs (XXVII, 226)
- Boborykins (Babarykiny) (XXVI, 222)
- Bobrishchev-Pushkins (XVII, 166)
- Bobrokovs (XXV, 210)
- Bokeyevs
- Borovskys, princes (II, 1)
- Borozdins (XXIX, 232)
- Boryatinskys, princes (XII, 112)
- Brityes-Rostovskys, princes (IX, 54)
- Buynosov-Rostovskys, princes (IX, 46)
- Bulgakovs, princes (IV, 13)
- Buturlins, counts and nobles (XVII, 172)
- Bukharins
- Bychkovs-Rostovskys, princes (IX, 54)

== C ==
- Chebotovs (XVII, 169)
- Cheglakovs (XV, 147)
- Chelyadnins (XVII, 175)
- Chernyatinskys (VII, 31)
- Chertoryzhskys (IV, 20)
- Chulkovs (XVII, 170)

== D ==
- Danilovs (XXX, 240)
- Dashkovs, princes (X, 58)
- Deyevs, princes (XI, 80)
- Dmitriyevs, nobles, Dmitriyev-Mamonovs, nobles and counts (XXX, 241)
- Dobrynskys (XXVII, 225)
- Dolgorukovs, princes (XII, 132)
- Dorogobuzhskys, princes (VII, 30)
- Dudins (XX, 185)
- Dulovs, princes (XI, 95)

== F ==
- Filimonovs (XV, 146)
- Fominskys, princes (XXXIV, 261)
- Fomins (XX, 189)

== G ==
- Gagarins, princes (XXIII, 200)
- Gagins (XI, 65)
- Galitskys, princes (II, 2; XXXVI, 269)
- Gvozdev-Rostovskys, princes (IX, 42)
- Glazatye-Shuyskie, princes (VIII, 35)
- Glebovs, Glebov-Streshnevs, Shakhovskie-Glebov-Streshnevs (XXXII, 252)
- Glinskys (XIII, 135)
- Godunovs, tsars and nobles (XIV, 136, 139)
- Golenin-Rostovskys (IX, 39)
- Golenyshchev-Kutuzovs, serene princes, counts and nobles (XVIII, 179)
- Golibesovskys, princes (XXIII, 199)
- Golitsyns, princes (IV, 14)
- Golovins, counts and nobles (XXXXI, 285)
- Goluby-Rostovskys, princes (IX, 53)
- Golygyins, princes (XI, 93)
- Gorbaty-Shuyskie, princes (VIII, 37)
- Gorensky-Obolenskys, princes (XII, 125)
- Gorodetskys, princes
- Gorchakovs, princes (XII, 102)
- Griboyedovs
- Gubastyes
- Gundorovs, princes (XXIII, 206)

== I ==
- Ivins (XXXVI, 272)
- Ignatyevs, counts and nobles (XVI, 151)
- Ilyins, nobles
- Izheslavskys (IV, 18)
- Islenyevs (XIX, 183)

== K ==
- Kamenskys (XVII, 177)
- Karachevskys (XII, 99)
- Kargolomskys, princes (XXXI, 250)
- Karpov-Dolmatovs (XXXIV, 263)
- Kasatkin-Rostovskys, princes (IX, 51)
- Katyrev-Rostovskys, princes (IX, 45)
- Kashinskys, princes
- Kashintsovs (XXIX, 235)
- Kashiny-Obolenskys, princes (XII, 131)
- Kvashnins, Kvashnin-Samarins (XX, 184, 189)
- Kemskys (XXXI, 248)
- Kievskys, princes
- Kirdyapins (VIII, 32)
- Kislovskys, nobles
- Klubkov-Masalskys, princes
- Kobylinys (XXVI, 212)
- Kovrovs, princes
- Kozelskys, princes
- Kozlovskys (XXXIV, 264)
- Kokorevs (XXVI, 215)
- Kokoshkins
- Koledinskys (XXIX, 233)
- Kologrivovs (XVII, 164)
- Koltovskys (XXXII, 253)
- Koltsov-Masalskys, princes
- Kolychevs (XXVI, 217)
- Koninskys (XII, 114)
- Konovnitsyns (XXVI, 214)
- Kopylskys, princes
- Koretskys, princes (IV, 17)
- Korkodinovs, princes (X, 57)
- Koshelevs (XVII, 168)
- Koshkins (XXVI, 223)
- Krivoborskys, princes (XXIII, 195)
- Kropotkins, princes (X, 59)
- Kubenskys, princes (XI, 69)
- Kurakins, princes (IV, 15)
- Kurbskys, princes (XI, 66)
- Kuritsyns (XVII, 176)
- Kurlyatov-Obolenskys, princes (XII, 116)
- Kurchevs (XVII, 161)
- Kutuzovs (XVIII, 178)
- Khvorostinins (XI, 87)
- Khvostovs (XXXX, 277–278)
- Khilkovs (XXIII, 204)
- Khlyznevs-Kolychevs (XXVI, 218)
- Khabarovs (XXVII, 230)
- Khovanskys (IV, 12)
- Khovrins (XXXXI, 284)
- Kholmskys (VII, 27)
- Khotetovskys (XII, 101)
- Khokholkovs (IX, 44–45)

== L ==
- Laptevs (XXXII, 256)
- Laskorevs (XXXXII, 287)
- Lastkins (IX, 50)
- Lachinovs (II, 336)
- Lebedevs (XXXX, 281)
- Lobanov-Rostovskys (IX, 52)
- Lodygins (XXVI, 213–214)
- Lopukhins (XXXII, 257)
- Loshakov-Kolychevs (XXVI, 219)
- Lugovskys (XI, 83)
- Lupandins (XXXII, 258)
- Lykovs (XII, 130)
- Lvovs (XI, 84)
- Lyalovskys (XXIII, 196)
- Lyapunovs (XXXVI, 273)
- Laletins (XXXII, 224)
- Levitskys

== M ==
- Mamonovs (XXX, 238–239)
- Matveyevs
- Matovs
- Matyushkins
- Mezetskys (XII, 111, 113)
- Meshkovs-Pleshcheevs (XVI, 158)
- Meshcherskys (XXXVIII, 275)
- Mikulinskys (VII, 28)
- Mikhaylovs, nobles (I, 137)
- Mozhayskys (II, 3)
- Molozhskys (XI, 89)
- Molchanovs
- Morozovs (XV, 142)
- Mortkins (XI, 77)
- Mosalskys (XII, 100)
- Moskotinyevs (XVI, 153)
- Mstislavskys (IV, 18, 23)
- Muromskys (VI, 25)
- Musin-Pushkins (XVII, 163)
- Myatlevs (XVII, 174)
- Mosolovs

== N ==
- Nagiye (XII, 120)
- Nebogatye (XXIII, 201)
- Nevezhins (XX, 186)
- Nemyatye-Kolychevs (XXVI, 220)
- Nepryuyevs (XXVI, 221)
- Neuchkins (XXIII, 198)
- Nogtevs (VIII, 38; XII, 117)
- Novichkovs (XX, 182)
- Novosiltsovs (XXXIX, 276)
- Nozdrevatyes (XII, 109)

== O ==
- Obedovs (XXXII, 259)
- Obolenskys (XII, 115)
- Obraztsovs (XXVI, 216)
- Ovtsyns (II, 319)
- Ovchinins (XII, 121)
- Odoyevskys (XII, 98)
- Oksakovs (XIX, 181)
- Osinins (XXXVI, 271)
- Osipovskys (XXIII, 197)
- Ostafyevs (XXXII, 254)
- Otyayevs (XXXX, 280)
- Okhlyabinins (XI, 86)
- Okhotin-Pleshcheevs (XVI, 156)
- Ochiny-Pleshcheevs (XVI, 157)

== P ==
- Paletskys (XXIII, 208)
- Peninskys (XII, 124)
- Penkovs (XI, 67)
- Peshkovs (XIV, 138)
- Pilyomovs (XIV, 137)
- Pinskys (IV, 21)
- Pleshcheevs (XVI, 150, 152, 158)
- Povodovs (XVII, 165)
- Pozharskys (XXIII, 194)
- Polevs (XXXV, 267)
- Polotskys (IV, 10, 24)
- Priimkovs (IX, 41)
- Prozorovskys (XI, 90)
- Pronskys (VI, 26)
- Pustoroslevs (XXIX, 234)
- Pushkins (XVII, 160)
- Puzhbolskys (IX, 49)
- Pyzhovs (XXXX, 282)
- Pyatyes (XVI, 154)

== R ==
- Repnins (XII, 123)
- Rozhnovs (XVII, 162)
- Rozladins (XX, 188)
- Romodanovskys (XXIII, 202)
- Rusalkins (XV, 149)
- Ryapolovskys (XXIII, 203)
- Ryumins (XII, 104)
- Rzhevskys (XXXIV, 265)

== S ==
- Saburovs (XIV, 136)
- Saltykovs (XV, 143)
- Samarins (XX, 187)
- Sandyrevskys (XI, 72)
- Shamins (XI, 92)
- Shastunovs (XI, 64)
- Shaferikov-Pushkins (XVII, 167)
- Shafrovs (XXXX, 283)
- Shakhovskys (XI, 76)
- Sheins (XV, 145)
- Shenshins(XVI, 87)
- Sheleshpanskys (XXXI, 247)
- Sheremetevs (XXVI, 224)
- Shestovs (XV, 148)
- Shekhonskys (XI, 79)
- Shistovs (XII, 107)
- Shishkovs (XXIX, 237)
- Shuiskys (VIII, 34)
- Shumorovskys (XI, 92)
- Shchenyatevs (IV, 16)
- Shchepiny-Rostovskys (IX, 40)
- Shchepiny-Obolenskys (XII, 129)
- Shcherbatovs (XII, 133)
- Shchetinins (XI, 70)
- Sviblovs (XVII, 159)
- Serdyukovs(XVII, 43)
- Serebryany-Obolenskys (XII, 128)
- Simskys (XXVII, 229)
- Siseyevs (XI, 63)
- Sitskys (XI, 88)
- Skarzhinskys (XVII, 298)
- Skopins (VIII, 33)
- Skryabins(XXXIV, 262)
- Sliznyovs (XVII, 173–174)
- Slutskys (IV, 21)
- Sontsovs (XI, 74)
- Spashskys (XII, 114)
- Speshnevs
- Spyachies (XII, 106)
- Starkovs (XXXIII, 260)
- Starodubskys (XXIII, 193)
- Strigins (XII, 118)
- Sugorskys (XXXI, 249)
- Sudskys (XI, 91)

== T ==
- Tatevs (XXIII, 205)
- Tatischevs (XXII, 192)
- Telepni (XII, 121)
- Telyatevskys (VII, 29)
- Tyomkins (IX, 48)
- Tyomno-siniye (XI, 71)
- Teryayevs (XXXII, 255)
- Tovarkovs (XVII, 168)
- Tokmakovs (XII, 109; XIV, 141)
- Tolbuzins (XXXIV, 266)
- Toruskys (XII, 110)
- Travins (XXXIV, 262)
- Trakhaniotovs (XXXXIII, 288)
- Tretyakovs (XXXXI, 286)
- Troekurovs (XI, 62)
- Trostensky (XII, 134)
- Trubetskoys (IV, 19)
- Tulupovs (XXIII, 207)
- Turenins (XII, 122)
- Tuchkovs (XV, 144)
- Tushins (XX, 190)
- Tyufyakins (XII, 126)

== U ==
- Uglickys (II, 5)
- Ukhorsky (XI, 85)
- Ukhtomskys (XXXI, 251)
- Ushatyes (XI, 94)

== Y ==
- Yanov-Rostovskys (IX, 47)
- Yaroslavovs (XII, 119)
- Yazykovs
- Yeletskys (XXXVII, 274)
- Yelizarovs (XXVII, 227)
- Yeropkins (XXXV, 268)
- Yukhotskys (XI, 68)
- Yuschetovs (XII, 53)

== Z ==
- Zabolotskys, nobles
- Zamyatnins, nobles
- Zaozerskys, princes (XI, 69)
- Zasekins, princes (XI, 73)
- Zernovs
- Zherebtsovs (XVI, 152)
- Zhizhemskys (X, 56)
- Zhirovy-Zasekins (XI, 75)
- Zhitovs (XXIX, 236)
- Zhostovs (XV, 149)
- Zhulebins (XVII, 171)
- Zvenigorodskys, princes (XII, 103, 106)
- Zventsovys-Zvenigorodskys, princes (XII, 108)
- Zlobins, nobles
- Zoloty-Obolenskys, princes (XII, 127)
- Zubatyes, princes (XI, 81)
