= Pyotr Saltykov =

Russian statesman and military officer (1698–1773)

Count Pyotr Semyonovich Saltykov
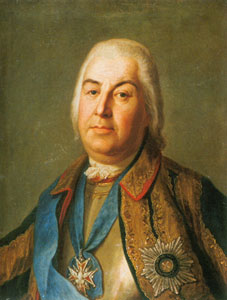
- Portrait by Pietro Rotari, 1760
- Born: December 21, 1698; Nikolskoye, Russia
- Died: January 6, 1773 (aged 74); Marfino, Russia
- Other name: Petr Semenovich Saltykov
- Relatives: House of Saltykov
- Military career
- Allegiance: Russia
- Branch: Imperial Russian Army
- Service years: 1714–1772
- Rank: Field marshal
- Commands: • Pskov Division; • Ukrainian Land Militia
- Conflicts: War of the Polish Succession; Russo-Swedish War (1741–1743); Seven Years' War; Third Silesian War; Battle of Zorndorf; Battle of Paltzig; Battle of Kunersdorf
- Awards: See § Awards

Count Pyotr Semyonovich Saltykov (Russian: Пётр Семёнович Салтыков, romanized: Pëtr Semënovič Saltykov; (Note: Pre-1918 orthography: Петръ Семеновичъ Салтыковъ) 21 December [O.S. 11 December] 1698 – 6 January 1773 [O.S. 26 December 1772]) was a Russian statesman and military officer, promoted to the rank of field marshal on 18 August 1759. Saltykov is one of the finest commanders in Russian history. The experience of Saltykov's military art was adopted and developed by Pyotr A. Rumyantsev, who served in his troops.

== Early life ==
Saltykov was born on 21 December [O.S. 11 December] 1698, in the village of Nikolskoye, located to the southwest of Lake Nero. He was the son of Semyon Andreyevich Saltykov (10 April 1672 – 1 October 1742), a landowner of an ancient boyar family which rivaled the Romanovs in the nobility and was descended from a sister of the first Romanov tsar, Michael, by his wife Fekla Yakovlevna Volynskaya. He had a younger brother, Count Vladimir Semyonovich Saltykov (6 August 1705 – 5 January 1751). He was a distant cousin of Sergei Vasilievich Saltykov, first lover of Catherine the Great, and was also related to Praskovia Fyodorovna Saltykova.

The year of his birth is uncertain. It is estimated as between 1697 and 1700, as in 1714 he was sent by Peter the Great to France to master the science of navigation. He remained there for much of the twenty years that followed.

In 1729, Saltykov bought the estate of Marfino, and in 1731 he married Princess Praskovia Yuriyevna Trubetskaya (1704–1767), a daughter of Prince Yuri Yuriyevich Troubetzkoy by his first wife Princess Yelena Grigoriyevna Cherkasskaya, and on 19 January 1732 or 1733, his father was created a count.

Saltykov took part in the campaign to Poland in 1733–1735. He also participated in the war in Finland in 1741–1743, then commanded the Pskov Division, and from 1756 – the Ukrainian Land Militia.

== Third Silesian War ==
During the Third Silesian War of 1756–1763, he took part in the capture of Königsberg, seized Elbing, and fought at Zorndorf (1758). In 1759, he was appointed commander-in-chief of the Russian army and would soon win victories at Paltzig (Battle of Kay) and Kunersdorf. In the latter he operated also with the Austrian contingent. According to contemporaries, few believed that this "gray-haired, small and simple old man" could be able to successfully resist the troops of the famous Frederick the Great. Russian military historian Dmitry Fyodorovich Maslovsky wrote about Saltykov:

"A broad, direct and correct view of military affairs, purely Russian devotion to Russia and love for the soldier were the qualities inherent in the new commander-in-chief."

Later, due to disagreements with the Austrian command leading to the Miracle of the House of Brandenburg, he was forced to primarily adopt positional tactics. In September 1760, due to health reasons, he left his position as commander-in-chief. As a commander, he skillfully chose and utilized the terrain for battle, placing great importance on the combination of infantry and artillery fire. When forming the battle formations of his troops, he did not always adhere to the principles of linear tactics that dominated at the time; in many cases, he arranged battle orders taking into account the peculiarities of the terrain and the possible actions of his enemy. During battles, he boldly maneuvered his troops and reserves.

== Later life ==
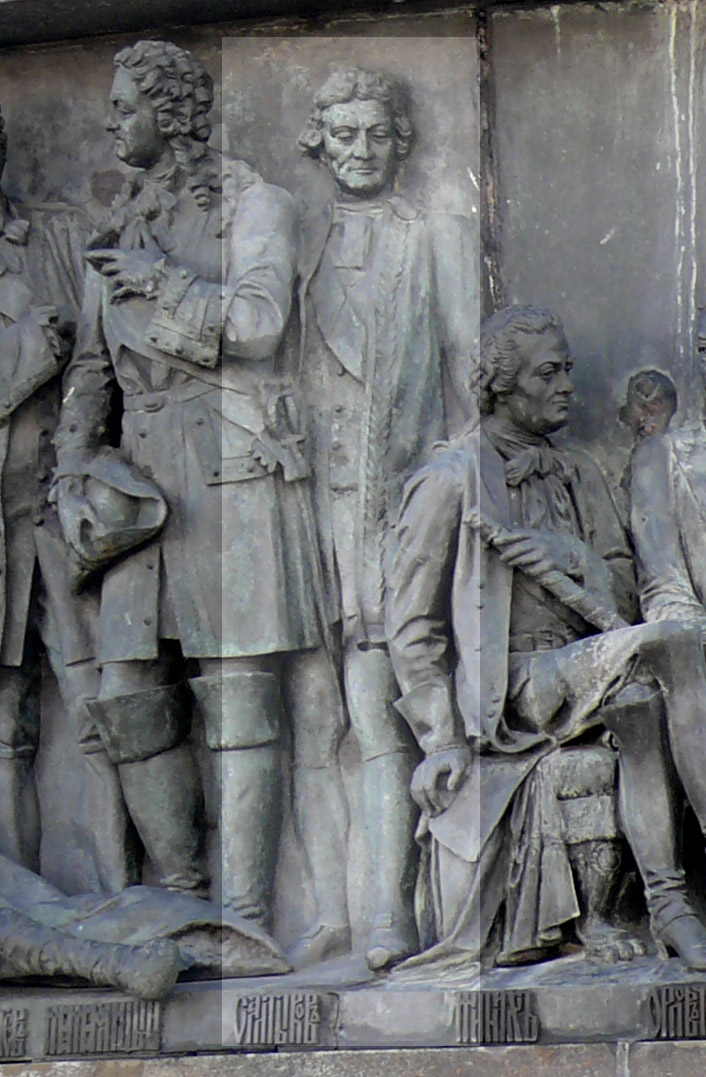
Saltykov on the monument "Millennium of Russia" in Veliky Novgorod.

In 1763, Saltykov became commander-in-chief of Moscow and was put in charge of the Moscow Senate Office. During Saltykov's time in office, he established a number of new post offices, restored Golovinsky and Kolomensky Palaces, and a number of city gates. They also repaired most of the worn-out bridges across the Moscow River and continued dismantling the walls of the White City (fortification belt around Moscow) in order to provide building material for the construction of the Orphanage ordered by Catherine the Great and the restoration of the Arsenal. In April 1764, Saltykov reported to Saint Petersburg on the opening of the Moscow Orphanage. With the purpose of providing Muscovites with food, Saltykov banned the removal of imported bread from the city and arranged for wholesale purchases of bread from landowners. He also secured regular wine deliveries to Moscow, the need for which had been estimated at 575,000 vedros. Saltykov was also fighting against gambling.

In 1765, he took part in burning of books "harmful to the society" at the order of Catherine the Great. During the plague outbreak in 1771, which caused mass departure of landowners, city officials, and rich merchants from Moscow, Pyotr Saltykov asked Catherine the Great for permission to leave the city. Without waiting for her reply, he left for his Marfino estate on the outskirts of Moscow. After a plague riot had broken out in Moscow on 16 September, Saltykov returned to the city. However, Catherine the Great relieved him of his post on 13 November 1771. After his retirement, the universally forgotten famous Elizabethan field marshal did not live for long and a year later died on his estate at Marfino.

== Awards ==
Saltykov was awarded the following honours:

- Order of St. Andrew (1758)
- Order of Saint Alexander Nevsky (1734)
- Order of the White Eagle from Augustus III of Poland
- Golden Weapon for Bravery, twice
- A diamond finger ring from Maria Theresa
- A snuffbox with diamonds from Maria Theresa

== Family ==
By his wife Princess Praskovia Yuriyevna Trubetskaya, Saltykov had:

- Countess Anastasia Petrovna Saltykova (26 November 1731 – 24 March 1830), married Pyotr Kvashnin-Samarin (died 19 October 1815)
- Countess Varvara Petrovna Saltykova, married on 4 November 1754 as his first wife Prince Vasily Borisovich Galitzine (died after 1793), later remarried, without issue from any of his marriages
- Count Ivan Petrovich Saltykov (29 June 1739 – 14 November 1805)
- Countess Ekaterina Petrovna Saltykova (2 October 1743 – Rome, 13 October 1816), married in 1762 Count Andrey Petrovich Shuvalov (23 June 1743 – 24 April 1789), and had issue

== Sources ==
- "Салтыков, Петр Семенович" . Brockhaus and Efron Encyclopedic Dictionary (in Russian). 1906.
