= Marfino =

Marfino (Russian: Марфино) is the name of several rural localities in Russia.

== Astrakhan Oblast ==
As of 2010, one rural locality in Astrakhan Oblast bears this name:

- Marfino, Astrakhan Oblast, a selo in Marfinsky Selsoviet of Volodarsky District

== Ivanovo Oblast ==
As of 2010, one rural locality in Ivanovo Oblast bears this name:

- Marfino, Ivanovo Oblast, a village in Vichugsky District

== Kaluga Oblast ==
As of 2010, two rural localities in Kaluga Oblast bear this name:

- Marfino, Tarussky District, Kaluga Oblast, a village in Tarussky District
- Marfino, Zhukovsky District, Kaluga Oblast, a village in Zhukovsky District

== Kostroma Oblast ==
As of 2010, three rural localities in Kostroma Oblast bear this name:

- Marfino, Chukhlomsky District, Kostroma Oblast, a village in Petrovskoye Settlement of Chukhlomsky District
- Marfino, Krasnoselsky District, Kostroma Oblast, a village in Chapayevskoye Settlement of Krasnoselsky District
- Marfino, Parfenyevsky District, Kostroma Oblast, a village in Nikolo-Polomskoye Settlement of Parfenyevsky District

== Moscow Oblast ==
As of 2010, four rural localities in Moscow Oblast bear this name:

- Marfino, Klinsky District, Moscow Oblast, a village in Nudolskoye Rural Settlement of Klinsky District
- Marfino, Mytishchinsky District, Moscow Oblast, a selo in Fedoskinskoye Rural Settlement of Mytishchinsky District
- Marfino, Naro-Fominsky District, Moscow Oblast, a village in Pervomayskoye Rural Settlement of Naro-Fominsky District
- Marfino, Odintsovsky District, Moscow Oblast, a village under the administrative jurisdiction of the work settlement of Novoivanovskoye in Odintsovsky District

== Nizhny Novgorod Oblast ==
As of 2010, two rural localities in Nizhny Novgorod Oblast bear this name:

- Marfino, Sosnovsky District, Nizhny Novgorod Oblast, a village in Rozhkovsky Selsoviet of Sosnovsky District
- Marfino, Voskresensky District, Nizhny Novgorod Oblast, a village in Nakhratovsky Selsoviet of Voskresensky District

== Novgorod Oblast ==
As of 2010, one rural locality in Novgorod Oblast bears this name:

- Marfino, Novgorod Oblast, a village in Novoselskoye Settlement of Starorussky District

== Penza Oblast ==
As of 2010, one rural locality in Penza Oblast bears this name:

- Marfino, Penza Oblast, a selo in Plessky Selsoviet of Mokshansky District

== Pskov Oblast ==
As of 2010, one rural locality in Pskov Oblast bears this name:

- Marfino, Pskov Oblast, a village in Opochetsky District

== Ryazan Oblast ==
As of 2010, one rural locality in Ryazan Oblast bears this name:

- Marfino, Ryazan Oblast, a village in Bolsheyekaterinovsky Rural Okrug of Putyatinsky District

== Saratov Oblast ==
As of 2010, one rural locality in Saratov Oblast bears this name:

- Marfino, Saratov Oblast, a selo in Atkarsky District

== Smolensk Oblast ==
As of 2010, one rural locality in Smolensk Oblast bears this name:

- Marfino, Smolensk Oblast, a village in Veshkovskoye Rural Settlement of Ugransky District

== Tver Oblast ==
As of 2010, one rural locality in Tver Oblast bears this name:

- Marfino, Tver Oblast, a village in Kimrsky District

== Vologda Oblast ==
As of 2010, two rural localities in Vologda Oblast bear this name:

- Marfino, Ustyuzhensky District, Vologda Oblast, a village in Mezzhensky Selsoviet of Ustyuzhensky District
- Marfino, Vologodsky District, Vologda Oblast, a village in Oktyabrsky Selsoviet of Vologodsky District

== Yaroslavl Oblast ==
As of 2010, one rural locality in Yaroslavl Oblast bears this name:

- Marfino, Yaroslavl Oblast, a village in Prechistensky Rural Okrug of Pervomaysky District
