= Saltykov family =

Saltykovs
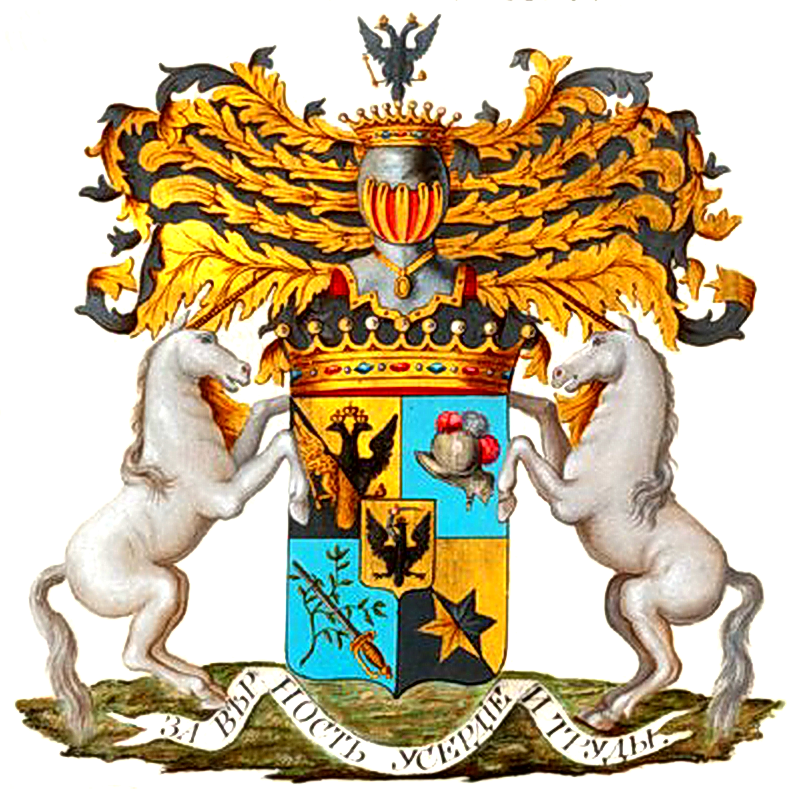
- Parent family: Morozovs
- Country: Russian Empire
- Current region: Moscow
- Titles: Grand Duke, Count
- Members: Darya Nikolayevna Saltykova; Darya Petrovna Saltykova; Ivan Saltykov; Mikhail Saltykov-Shchedrin; Nikolai Saltykov; Praskovia Saltykova; Pyotr Saltykov; Sergei Saltykov

The House of Saltykov (Russian: Салтыков, IPA: [səltɨˈkof]) is the name of an old Russian noble family that can trace its ancestry back to 1240. In March 1730, the family was awarded the title of Count in Russia, granted to them by Empress Anna of Russia.

== Origin and history of the noble family ==
In the Velvet Book, their ancestor is named Mikhail Ignatievich Morozov-Saltyk (or Soltyk), and his ancestor is a certain Misha Prushanin (1240). His descendants, Andrei Saltykov, gunsmith (1508) of Grand Duke Vasily Ivanovich. Boris Ivanovich governor of Ivan the Terrible. Ivan Danilovich, owned estates (1568). Timofey Ivanovich, nicknamed Kurgan, was written (1630) among the nobles and children of boyars with a local salary. Stepan Timofeevich Saltykov was granted an estate (1676)

During the Time of Troubles, boyar Mikhail Saltykov-Krivoy defended the transfer of the Russian crown to the Polish prince. Together with some relatives, he subsequently settled in the Polish-Lithuanian Commonwealth. The Polish branch of the family (Saltyki), like the Russian one, uses the Soltyk coat of arms.

== Serene Highnesses Prince Saltykov ==
The princely branch comes from Field Marshal General N.I. Saltykov (1736-1816), who, by imperial decree (August 31, 1814), received with his offspring the princely title, with the title of Lordship.Princess Natalya Yuryevna Saltykova, was supremely confirmed (July 19, 1845) in male and female offspring, established by her father, Count Yuri Alexandrovich Golovkin, a reserved estate, with the name of Golovkin, and she began to be called Princess Saltykova-Golovkina.Princes Saltykov, 1814—1941

== Notable family members or namesakes ==
- Aleksey Saltykov (disambiguation), several people
- Darya Nikolayevna Saltykova (1730–1801), Russian serial killer
- Darya Petrovna Saltykova (1739–1802), Russian lady-in-waiting and socialite
- Irina Saltykova (born 1966), Russian pop singer
- Ivan Saltykov (1730–1805), Russian Field-Marshal
- Mikhail Saltykov-Shchedrin (1826–1889), leading Russian satirist, known under his pen name Shchedrin
- Nikolai Saltykov (1736–1816), Russian field marshal
- Praskovia Saltykova (1664–1723), Tsarina, wife of Ivan V of Russia
- Pyotr Saltykov (1698–1772), Russian statesman and military commander who defeated Frederick the Great
- Sergei Saltykov (c. 1726 – 1765), Russian noble, first lover of Catherine the Great

== Places ==
- Saltykov Mansion

== See also ==
- Sołtyk coat of arms, for the Polish branch of this noble family.
