= Ekaterina Chernysheva =

Russian courtier

Ekaterina Andreevna Chernysheva
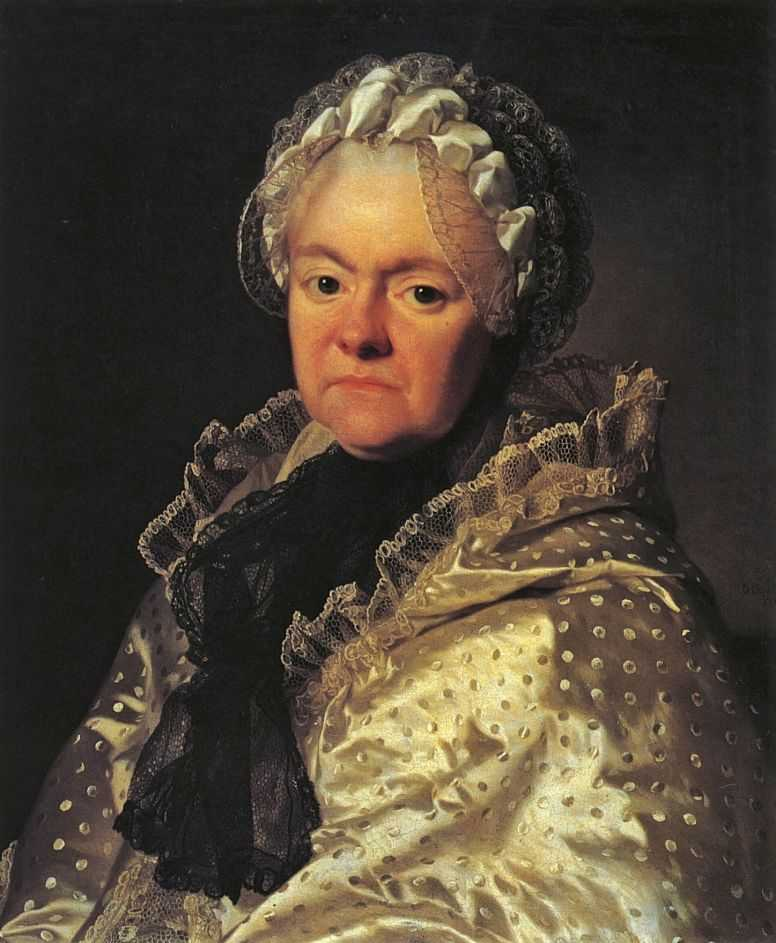
- Born: Ekaterina Andreyevna Ushakova; 22 October 1715; Saint Petersburg, Russian Empire
- Died: 25 September 1779 (aged 63); Saint Petersburg, Russian Empire
- Buried: Lazarevskoe Cemetery of the Alexander Nevsky Lavra
- Noble family: Ushakov
- Spouse: Pytor Chernyshev
- Issue: Darya Petrovna Saltykova; Natalya Petrovna Golitsyna
- Father: Count Andrei Ivanovich Ushakov
- Mother: Elena Leontyevna Kokoshkina
- Occupation: Maid of honour

Countess Ekaterina Andreyevna Chernysheva (née Ushakova Russian: Екатерина Андреевна Чернышёва; 22 October 1715 – 25 September 1779) was a Russian lady-in-waiting.

== Biography ==
Ekaterina was the only child of Andrei Ushakov from his second marriage to Elena Leontyeva Apraksina, née Kokoshkina. Count Ushakov was a friend of Peter the Great who arranged the marriage. During the reign of Empress Anna, Ushakov was the head of the Secret Chancellery and had great influence at court.

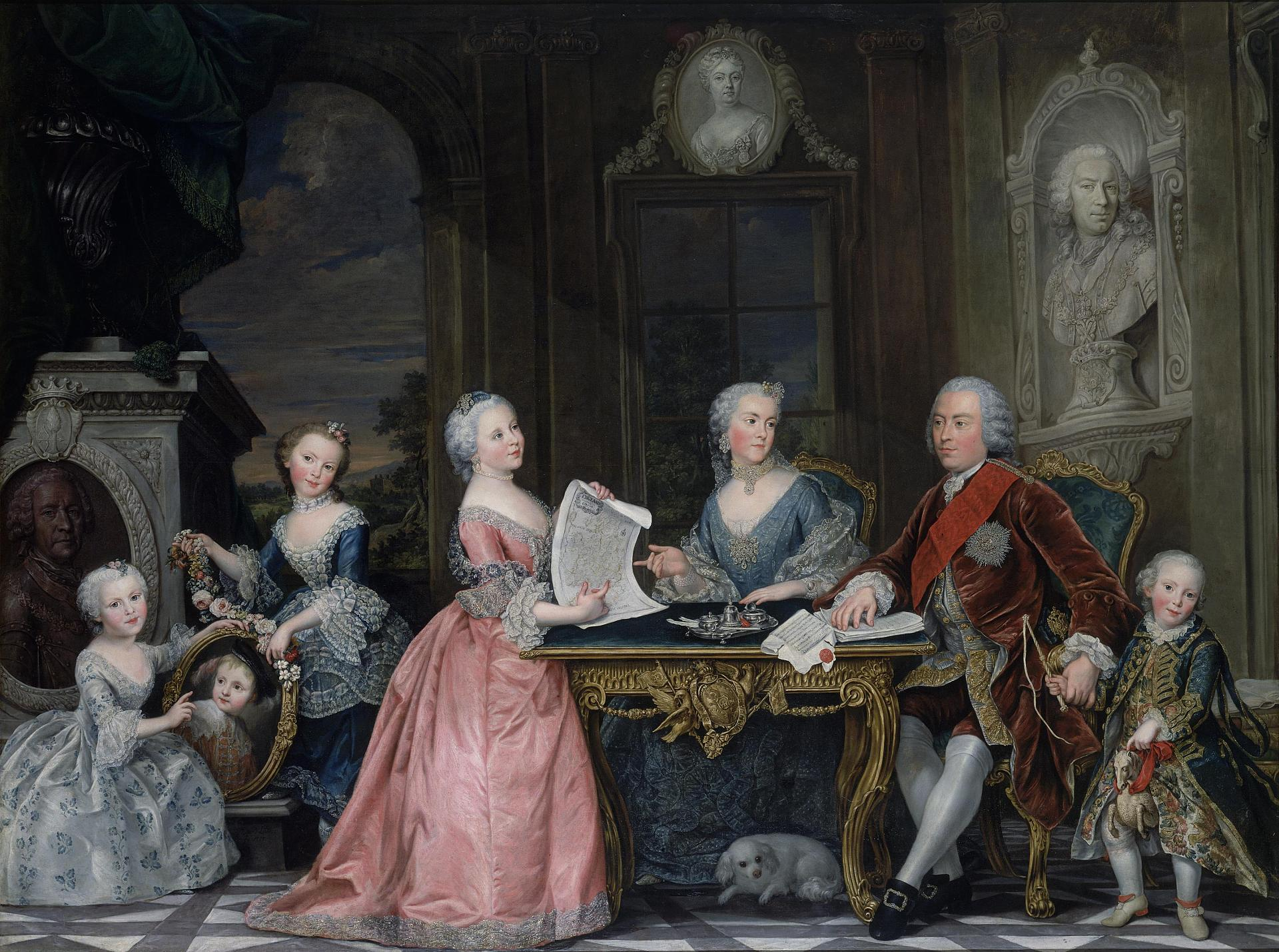
Portrait of the Chernyshev family by David Lüders

Count Ushakov was a passionate father and adored his daughter. Ekaterina grew up in luxury and received a good education at home. On 18 April 1730, Empress Anna granted her the rank of maid of honour, which she would fulfill until her marriage in 1738.

In her youth, Ekaterina Andreyevna was a close friend of Anna Leopoldovna. Ernst Johann von Biron wanted to use Ekaterina's relationship with the Grand Duchess to disrupt her proposed marriage to Duke Anthony Ulrich of Brunswick and instead marry her to his son Peter. However, Anna Leopoldovna hated the Birons, and her friend's praise urged her to give her consent to Brunswick.

=== Marriage ===
On 26 May 1738, Ekaterina married the privy councillor Count Pytor Chernyshev. The wedding took place at court. The bride was escorted to the church by Tsarevna Elizaveta Petrovna and Grand Duchess Anna Leopoldovna. She was led to the altar by Prince Karl of Courland.

Chernyshev was an intelligent man. In early 1741, during the regency of Anna Leopoldovna, Chernyshev was appointed ambassador to Denmark–Norway, and was later transferred to Prussia. When Ekaterina travelled to Berlin to join her husband, Empress Elizaveta ordered that she should not kiss the hands of the Princess of Anhalt- Zerbst, the mother of the future Grand Duchess, Ekaterina Alekseevna. Chernyshev would later have appointments in London, and in Paris at the court of Louis XV.

The family returned to Russia in 1762 as Chernyshev had been appointed as a senator. They settled in Saint Petersburg in 16 Dvortsovaya Embankment, which Ekaterina Andreevna inherited after her father's death in 1747. In her later life, Ekaterina was rarely seen in society and almost never showed up at court.

Ekaterina Andreevna died on 25 September 1779 from a stroke and was buried in the Lazarevskoye Cemetery of the Alexander Nevsky Lavra.

== Children ==
The Chernyshevs had 11 children, 3 sons and 8 daughters. Almost all the children died in infancy:

- Anna Petrovna (1738 – October 1756), died of typhus
- Darya Petrovna (1739 – 1802), lady in waiting, married Count Ivan Saltykov
- Natalya Petrovna (1744 – 1837), lady in waiting, married Prince Vladimir Borisovich Golitsyn, basis for Pushkin's The Queen of Spades
- Andrei Petrovich, died in infancy
- Grigory Petrovich (1746 – 1755) died in Narva, on the wat from England to Saint Petersburg
- Maria Petrovna (1752 – October 1767), died of smallpox
