= Starkov =

Starkov may refer to:

- Stárkov, a town in the Czech Republic
- Starkov (surname)
