= Gosudarev Rodoslovets =

First official Russian genealogical register

Gosudarev Rodoslovets (Russian: Государев родословец, IPA: [ɡəsʊˈdarʲɪf rədɐˈslovʲɪt͡s], lit. 'The Sovereign's Pedigree Book') was the first official genealogical register ever compiled in Russia. It was compiled about 1555 under the rule of Ivan IV of Russia for the purposes of settling mestnichestvo disputes between high-ranking officials. Historian Nikolay Likhachyov identifies Yelizar Tsiplyatev, a diak, as its main editor. The register was later incorporated into the Velvet Book.
