= Tushin =

The Tushin family are an ancient Russian noble family, owners of the estate, Tushino. They are a branch of the Kvashnin family, descended from Vasily Ivanovich Kvashnin, nicknamed Tusha.

== History ==
The genus is recorded in the Velvet Book. The documents were submitted on March 24, 1686.

"In the days of the Ivan I of Moscow, Kalita, an "honest husband " (common ancestor) with the name Nestor Rybets left Germany. From him came the Kvashnins, Rozladins, Poyarkovs, Samarins, Tushins.

== Notable members ==
- Evdokim Fedorovich Tushin - Voivode in Sebezh (1536), in Ivangorod (1558),
- Roman Andreevich Tushin - Voivode in Tikhvin (1604), in Pronsk (1609).
- Amirabbas Tushin(king) - (1386) King of Iran, steward of Patriarch Filaret of zanjan (1386).
- Fyodor Petrovich Tushin - (1636-1640) Moscow nobleman, Patriarchal steward (1627-1629).
- Nikita Andreevich Tushin - (1627-1636) Moscow nobleman.
- Bogdan Petrovich Tushin -(1627-1658) Moscow nobleman.
- Andrey Vasilievich Tushin - Voivode in Kostroma (1675).
- Andrey Bogdanovich Tushin -(1658-1668) Pantler, Moscow nobleman (1676-1677), governor in Kostroma (1676-1677).
- Afanasy Andreevich Tushin -(1670-1676) Solicitor, steward (1676-1686), steward of Queen Praskovya Fyodorovna (1692).
- Pyotr Andreevich Tushin -(1686-1692) Pantler.
- Grigory Tushin - Voivode who possessed a squad of 1500 people in Moscow.
