= Karpov =

Karpov (masculine, Russian: Карпов) or Karpova (feminine, Russian: Карпова) is a Russian surname of the Karpov family. Notable people with the surname include:

- Aleksandr Karpov (1917–1944), Soviet ace, double Hero of the Soviet Union
- Andriy Karpov (born 1987), Ukrainian motorcyclist
- Anatoly Karpov (born 1951), Russian chess grandmaster, Undisputed World Chess Champion 1975–85, and FIDE World Chess Champion 1993–99
- Dmitriy Karpov (born 1981), Kazakhstani athlete, husband of Irina
- Elena Karpova (born 1980), Russian basketball player
- Irina Karpova (born 1980), Kazakhstani athlete, wife of Dmitriy
- Lev Iakovlevich Karpov (1879–1921), Russian Chemist and Bolshevik revolutionary
- Sergey Karpov (born 1948), Russian historian
- Valeri Karpov (born 1971), Soviet ice hockey player
- Vladimir Karpov (1922–2010), Soviet soldier and writer
- Vladimir Karpov (politician) (1948–2015), Russian politician

== See also ==
- 90414 Karpov, a main-belt asteroid
