= Pytor Chernyshev =

Russian nobleman, diplomat, privy counsellor, chamberlain and senator

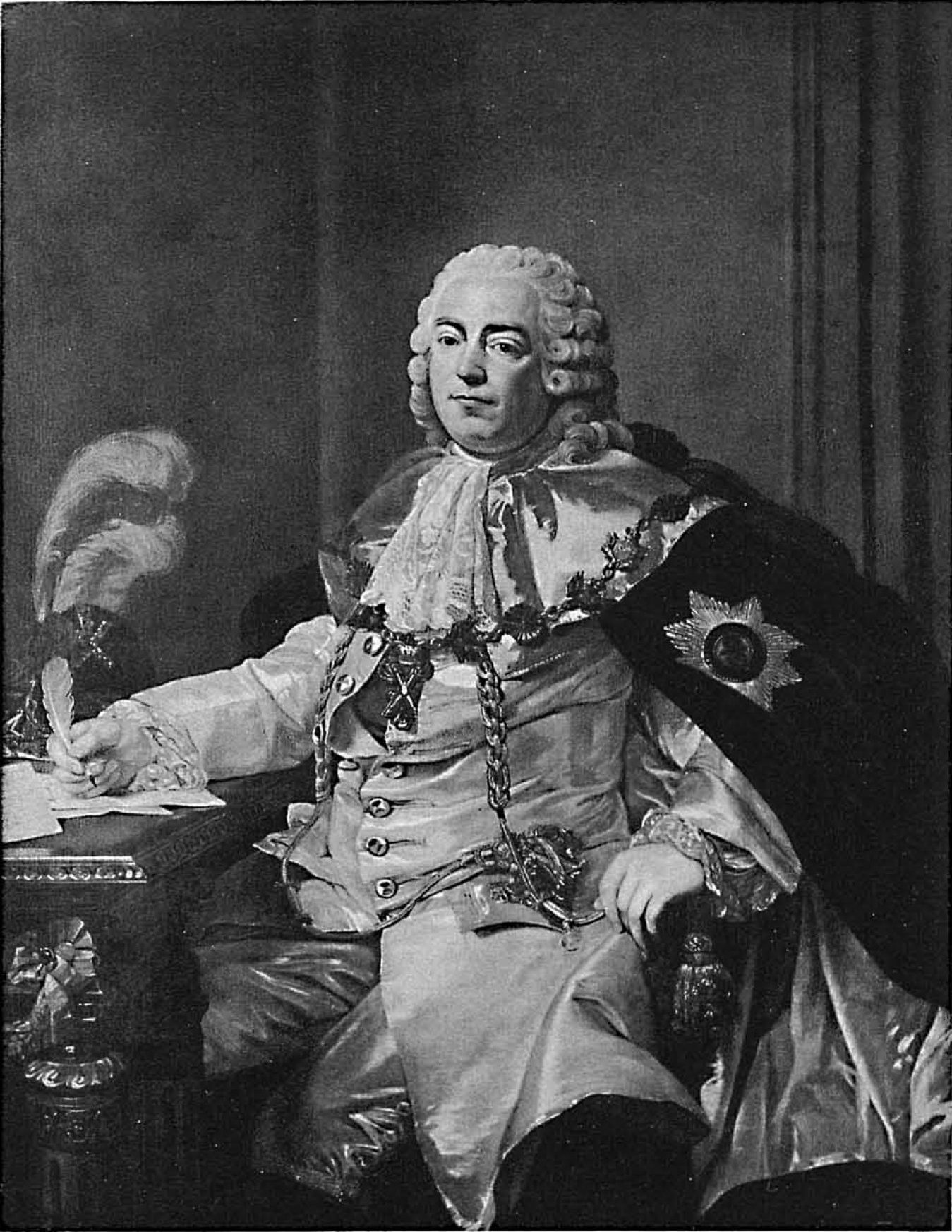
Portrait of Count Chernyshev, after Alexandre Roslin.

Count Pyotr (Note: On occasions, Piotr) Grigoryevich Chernyshev (Russian: Граф Пётр Григорьевич Чернышёв; 24 March 1712 – 20 August 1773) was a Russian Imperial nobleman, diplomat, privy counsellor, chamberlain, and senator.

== Early life ==
A member of the Chernyshyov family, he was the son of Grigory Chernyshev (1672–1745) and Avdotya Rzhevskaya (1693–1747). Among his siblings were mayor of Moscow, Count Zakhar Chernyshev and Imperial Russian Field Marshal and General Admiral Count Ivan Chernyshyov.

His father was a close friend of Peter the Great, who was also Pyotr's godfather.

== Career ==
Pyotr enlisted in the Preobrazhensky Regiment as a child and from 1722 to 1727 served under the young Charles Frederick, Duke of Holstein-Gottorp (1700-1739) as a page, Kammerpage and finally lieutenant-captain. In 1741, during the reign of Empress Anna of Russia, he was made ambassador extraordinary to Denmark and soon afterwards ambassador extraordinary to the Kingdom of Prussia, then ruled by Frederick the Great.

Next, in 1746, he was posted to London, assisting at the Congress of Aix-la-Chapelle at the end of the War of the Austrian Succession between April and October 1748. He helped edit the treaty between Louis XIV and the maritime powers that resulted from the Congress, signed on 18 October 1748 - it settled the succession question and maritime questions and was recognised by Silesia and Prussia.

== Personal life ==
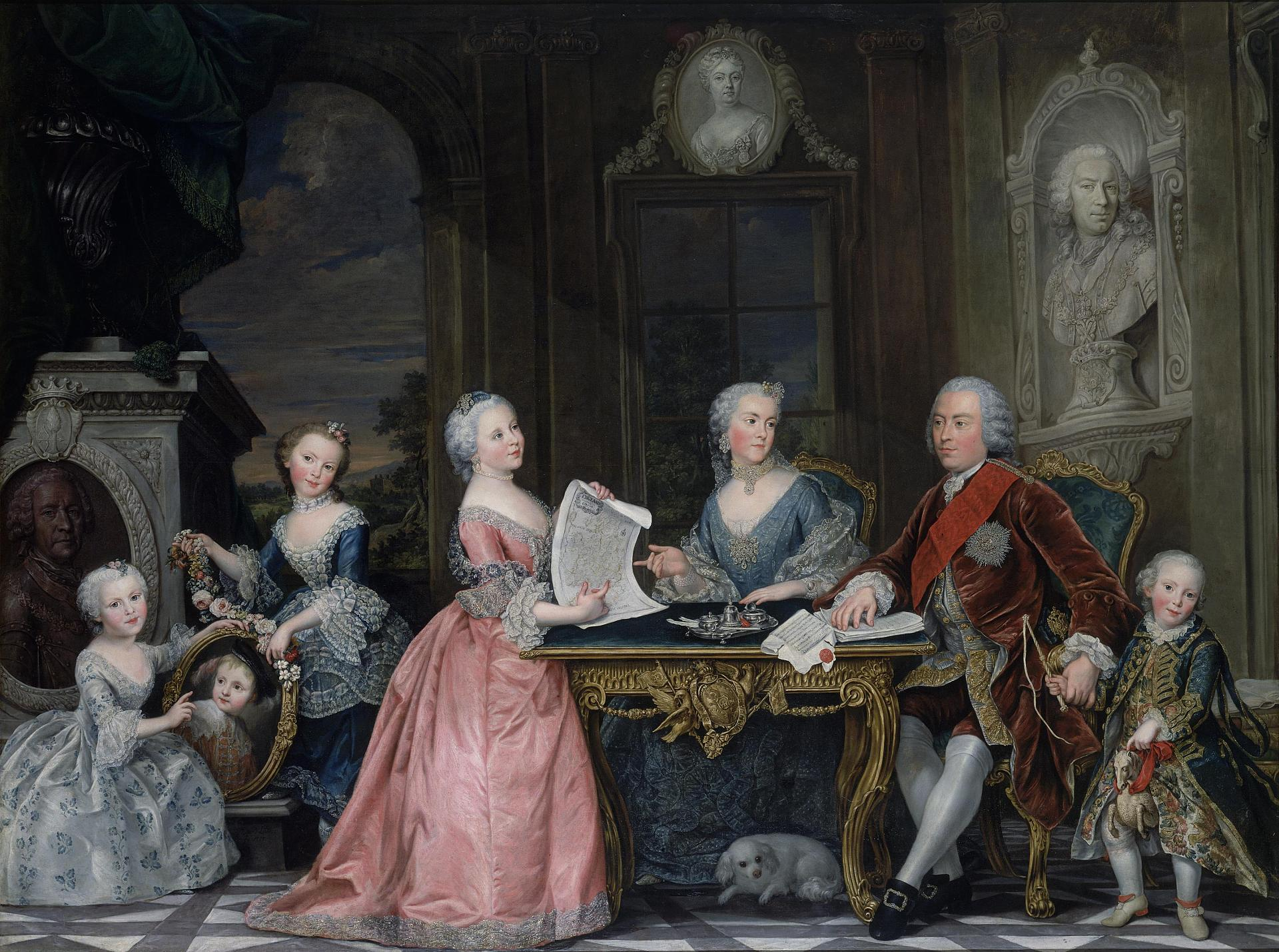
Portrait of Ambassador Chernyshev, his wife, Ekaterina, and their daughters Anna, Darya and Natalya, and their son Grigory, by David Lüders, 1750

Count Chernyshev married Ekaterina Chernysheva (1715–1779), the daughter of Andrei Ushakov. Ekaterina was maid of honour to Empress Anna of Russia, as well as favourite and confidante of Anna Leopoldovna. Together, they were the parents of:

- Countess Darya Petrovna Chernyshyova (1739–1802), a friend of the French painter Élisabeth Vigée Le Brun; she married Field Marshal Count Ivan Petrovich Saltykov in 1769.
- Countess Natalya Petrovna Chernyshyova (1741–1837), inspiration for Pushkin's The Queen of Spades; she married Prince Vladimir Borisovich Golitsyn in 1766.

Count Chernyshev died of dropsy in Saint Petersburg and was buried at the Alexander Nevsky Lavra in the Lazarevskoe Cemetery. His tomb inscription reads "His life was cut short by multiplying diseases, to the extreme sorrow of his neighbours and to the sincere grief of his friends and admirers". The later historian Pyotr Vladimirovich Dolgorukov wrote that "He was an intelligent and talented man, but immensely arrogant, unusually vain and intolerably arrogant; nobody loved him."

== Awards ==
- Order of Saint Alexander Nevsky
- Order of Saint Andrew
