= Darya Petrovna Saltykova =

Russian lady-in-waiting, socialite and noble

Countess Darya Petrovna Saltykova Order of St. Catherine
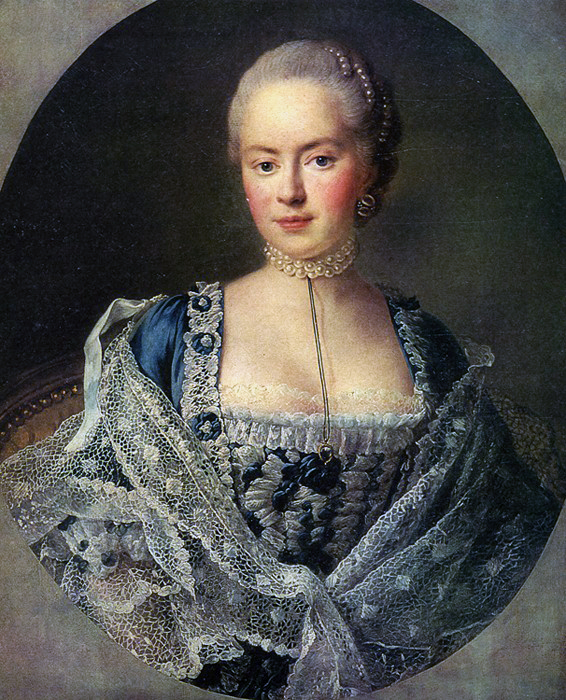
- Portrait by François-Hubert Drouais, 1762; Pushkin Museum

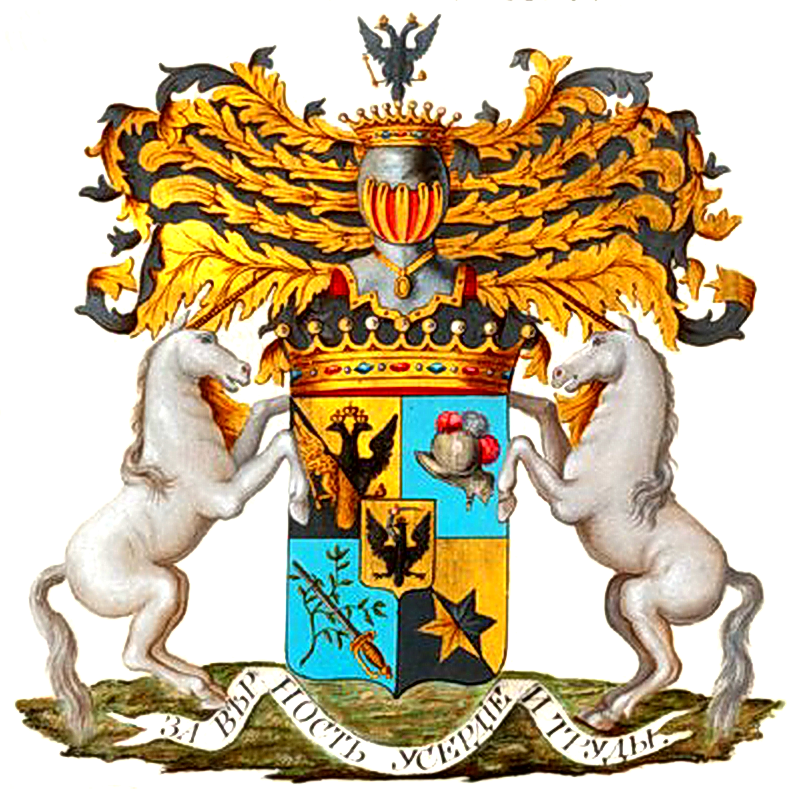
- Coat of arms
- Born: Darya Petrovna Chernyshyova; 20 September 1739; Saint Petersburg, Russian Empire
- Died: 23 December 1802 (aged 63); Khotilovo, Valdaysky Uyezd, Novgorod Governorate, Russia
- Noble family: Saltykovs
- Spouse: Ivan Saltykov
- Issue: Praskovya, Yekaterina, Anna, Pyotr
- Father: Piotr Chernyshev
- Mother: Ekaterina Chernysheva
- Occupation: State Lady

Countess Darya Petrovna Saltykova (Russian: Дарья Петровна Салтыкова; née Chernyshyova/Chernysheva (Чернышёва); September 20, 1739 – December 23, 1802) was a Russian lady-in-waiting, socialite and noble and Dame of the Order of St. Catherine's first degree. She was the sister of the lady in waiting Princess Nataliya Petrovna Chernysheva, and in 1769 married to Field Marshal Count Ivan Petrovich Saltykov.

== Life ==
She was the eldest daughter of a diplomat, Count Peter G. Chernyshev, godson (and rumoured son) of Peter the Great, and Catherine Andreevna, daughter of a famous chief of the secret office during the time of Biron, Count Andrei Ivanovich Ushakov. She spent her early life abroad with her father, primarily in England, where she received an excellent education. Upon her return in 1762, she and her sister became known as two of the most learned women in Russia.

In 1762, she was appointed maid of honor to Empress Catherine the Great. She participated in the famous court masquerade of 1766 and at the great amateur theatre performance of 1768, where she was given much attention. After her marriage to Ivan Petrovich Saltykov in 1769, she became a leading figure in the Russian nobility. In 1780–83, she made a trip through Europe with her family, and on their return, her spouse was made governor of Vladimir. In 1793, she was appointed lady in waiting.

She was known for her intellect, and hosted great salons. Her marriage was apparently a happy one, and she and her husband exchanged many letters full of loving remarks.

== See also ==
- Filipp Vigel, diarist who wrote about her
