= Razriady (books) =

15–17th century register books in Russian office work

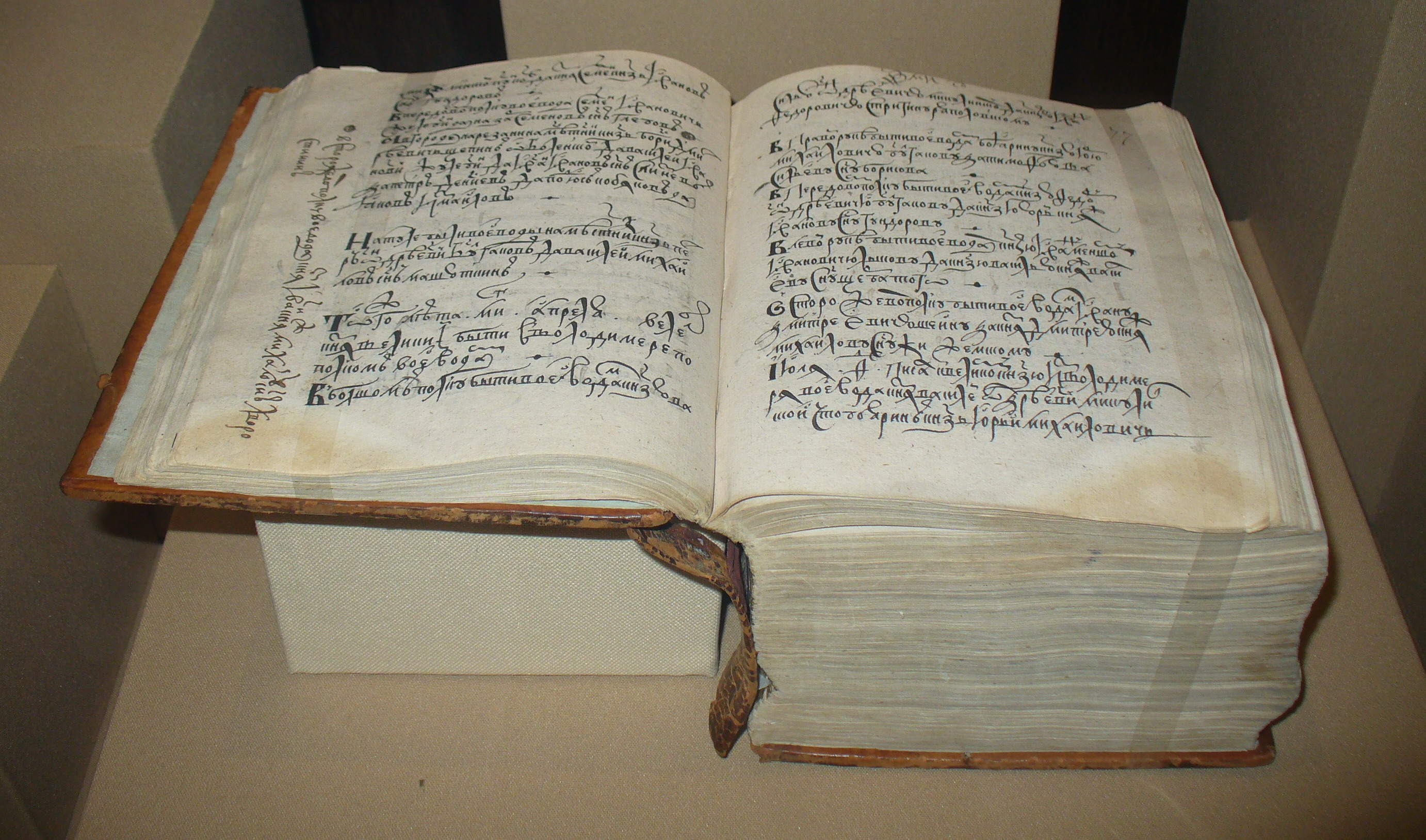
A razriad book of the 17th century, exposed in the State Historical Museum, Moscow

Razriady (Russian: Разряды; also razriadnye knigi, "razriad books") were a kind of register books in traditional Russian office work in the 15th to 17th centuries. These were annual records that included the appointment of the noblemen to various posts, as well as descriptions of major military campaigns, information on the weddings of rulers and their relatives, on receptions of ambassadors, on awards for service, etc. The originals of razriad books were burned in 1682 in order to fight against mestnichestvo; however, some copies and compilations (of varying quality) were preserved. The razriady are one of the most important sources in the history of the early-modern Russian state.

== History ==
The Russian word razriad can be translated as "section, division, category". Thus, it denoted both the appointment to various posts, and, in the 17th century, the type of territorial–military organization.

An early type of razriad books was the so-called "service books", which had been maintained since at least 1475. However, in the beginning they were maintained irregularly, and there are no records for some years. Then the entries become regular and quickly increase in their size. Records of the appointment of nobles to various military, administrative and court posts were recorded in this service books, and this was usually done shortly after the events.

The originals of the “service books” were not preserved. Partially, they were annihilated in fires, and then destroyed during the abolition of mestnichestvo in 1682. However, various copies have been preserved (more than 120 are known), which were made by various nobles for use in disputes over appointments. According to the tradition of mestnichestvo the high post occupied by the ancestor of the nobleman allowed him not to obey another nobleman whose ancestors did not reach such high ranks. Then these service books were used as material for compiling shorter official "sovereign razriady", as well as for various kinds of reduced editions created on a private initiative. The known copies of razriad books often contain information from other sources, for example, compilations from chronicles, from various documents, etc.
