= Aleksey Saltykov =

Aleksey/Alexey/Alexei Saltykov may refer to:

- Alexey Saltykov (director) (1934–1993), Soviet and Russian film director
- Alexey Saltykov (1806–1859), Russian traveller, writer and artist
- Alexey Petrovich Saltykov, Governor of Moscow (1713–1716) and Governor of Kazan (1719–1725)

== See also ==
- Saltykov, a Russian masculine surname
