= Ivan Saltykov =

Russian Field Marshal

Count Ivan Saltykov
- Иван Салтыков
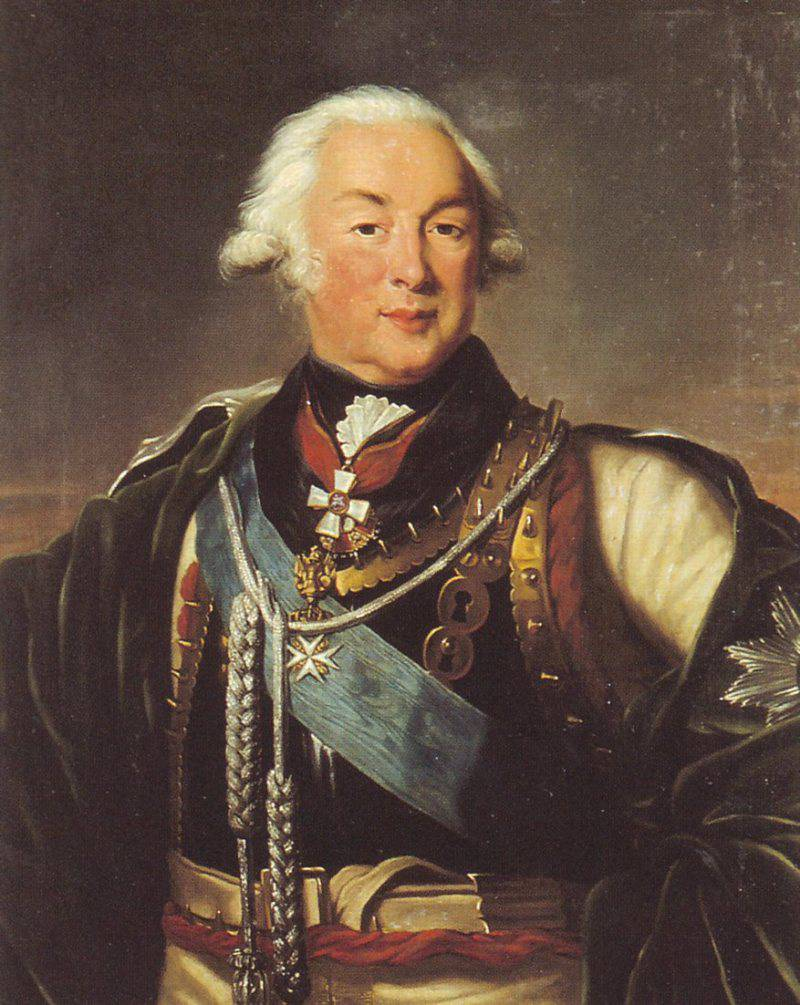

Military governor of Moscow
- In office 1797–1804
- Preceded by: Yuri Vladimirovich Dolgorukov
- Succeeded by: Alexander Bekleshov

Viceroy of Caucasus
- In office 1789–1790
- Preceded by: Peter Tekeli
- Succeeded by: Anton de Balmen

Personal details
- Born: June 28, 1730
- Died: November 14, 1805 (aged 75)
- Relations: Pyotr Saltykov (father); Darya Saltykova (wife)
- Awards: Order of St. Alexander Nevsky (1762); Order of St. George 2nd Class (1775); Order of St. Andrew (1782); Order of St. Vladimir 1st Class (1789); Golden Weapon for Bravery

Military service
- Rank: General-Field Marshal
- Battles/wars: Seven Years' War; Russo-Turkish War (1768–1774); Sheikh Mansur Movement; Russo-Turkish War (1787–1792); Russo-Swedish War

Count Ivan Petrovich Saltykov (Russian: Ива́н Петро́вич Салтыко́в; 28 June 1730 – 14 November 1805) was a Russian field marshal, the governor-general of Moscow from 1797 to 1804, and owner of the grand estate of Marfino.

== Biography ==
Ivan was the only son of Field-Marshal Pyotr Semyonovich Saltykov. He began military service at the age of 15 in the Semenovsky Regiment at the rank of private. In 1758 he was inducted into the Imperial Court at the junior rank of Kamer-Junker.

During the Seven Years' War Saltykov distinguished himself at the capture of both Königsberg and Elbing, and at the Battle of Zorndorf. After the onset of peace he received a promotion to major general and was decorated with the Order of St. Anna, 2nd class, by Peter III. At Catherine the Great's coronation, he was awarded the Order of St. Alexander Nevsky.

At the start of the Russo-Turkish War of 1768–1774 the now Lieutenant-General Saltykov served under the command of Rumyantsev at the Battle of Kagul. He was also present at the seizure of Khotyn. Commanding the army's heavy cavalry forces, he gained marked distinction for his bravery and received both the Order of St. George, 2nd Class, and the Gold Sword for Bravery with Diamonds.

With the end of yet another war, Saltykov was now a full General and sent to command a corps stationed in the newly acquired Polish provinces of the empire.

In 1780, to improve the health of his family he set out on an extended journey beyond the borders of Russia. With his wife and young children he traveled to Berlin, Dresden, and Brussels. They lived for three months in London and spent the better part of a year in Paris, where the Saltykovs lived so extravagantly that a Russian messenger to the French court wrote to Count Alexander Vorontsov that "They are the disgrace of our whole nation."

In 1784 he was given governorship over both Vladimir and Kostroma Viceroyalties while also being appointed a General-Adjutant. In 1788 War broke out anew with Turkey, and the general was called to join the ranks of the field army. His army succeeded in retaking the Khotyn Fortress. In 1790 Catherine entrusted him with command of the army based in Finland. During this, an unsuccessful operation was conducted under his supervision. Upon the signing of the Treaty of Värälä, Saltykov was granted the honorary lieutenant-colonelcy of the Life Guard Horse Regiment and the Order of St. Andrew with Diamonds.

Saltykov's military leadership was primarily distinguished by his tremendous bravery. His skills in other areas of command were considered somewhat lacking. Suvorov, for example was reportedly highly skeptical of his abilities. Additionally, Saltykov became enmeshed in a controversy with Rumyantsev which forced him in 1795 to retire, yet the following year Paul ascended to the throne and recalled him to the service. The new emperor showered him with distinctions, updating his rank to full general, making him the chief of His Majesty's Cuirassier Regiment, and Governor-General of Kiev. Not soon after he was made a field marshal and inspector general of cavalry for the entire army.

Towards the end of 1797, Saltykov was appointed Governor-General of Moscow, which in a previous era had been held by his father. In reality, the reins of government were held by another appointee of Paul; the Prussian-born police chief Fyodor Ertel. The Count left for himself only the responsibilities of command over the city's military parades and ceremonial appearances. Muscovites for a long time afterwards recalled his magnificent and wasteful lifestyle.

The death of his wife in 1802 was a heavy blow for Saltykov, and was a major factor in the decline of his own health, which prompted him to ask for retirement in 1804. He moved to Saint Petersburg, living in the home of his wealthy son-in-law Pyotr Myatlev, and died soon after. He was buried near his father at the village of Nikolskoye near Rostov.

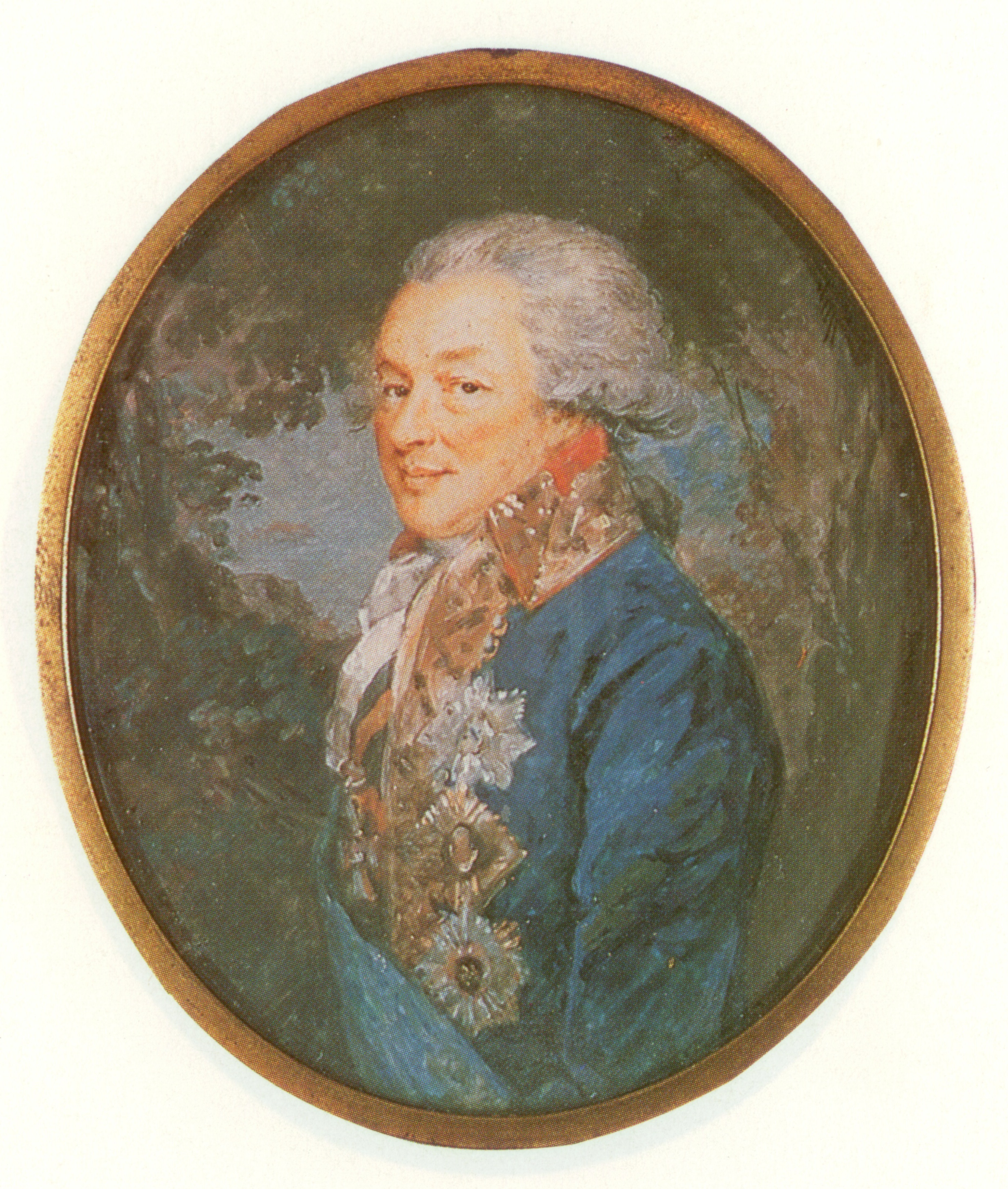
I.P. Saltykov, 1790

== Family ==
Count Saltykov was married to Darya Petrovna Saltykova, daughter of the noted diplomat Pyotr Grigoryevich Chernyshyov. She was esteemed as a pillar of the Moscow high society and had an extremely close relationship to her husband. Together they had four children: Praskovya (1772–1859), Ekaterina (1776–1815), Anna (1777–1824), and Pyotr (1784–1813). The daughters all served as ladies-in-waiting at the Imperial Court, and two went on to marry and have children. Pyotr followed in his father's footsteps as a cavalry officer. He became a decorated colonel in the army during Napoleon's Invasion of Russia, but died less than a year later from medical complications that resulted from being wounded in battle. He was unmarried and childless.

== Bibliography ==
- Великий князь Николай Михайлович. «Русские портреты XVIII и XIX столетий». Выпуск 2, № 104.
- Бантыш-Каменский, Д. Н. 33-й Генералъ-Фельдмаршалъ Графъ Иванъ Петровичь Салтыковъ // Биографии российских генералиссимусов и генерал-фельдмаршалов. В 4-х частях. Репринтное воспроизведение издания 1840 года. – М.: Культура, 1991.

Government offices
Preceded by Pyotr Rumyantsev as General Governor of Kiev, Chernigov and Novgorod-Siversky	Governor-General of Kiev; 1796–1802	Succeeded by
