= Mestnichestvo =

Historical feudal hierarchy system in 15th to 17th-century Russia

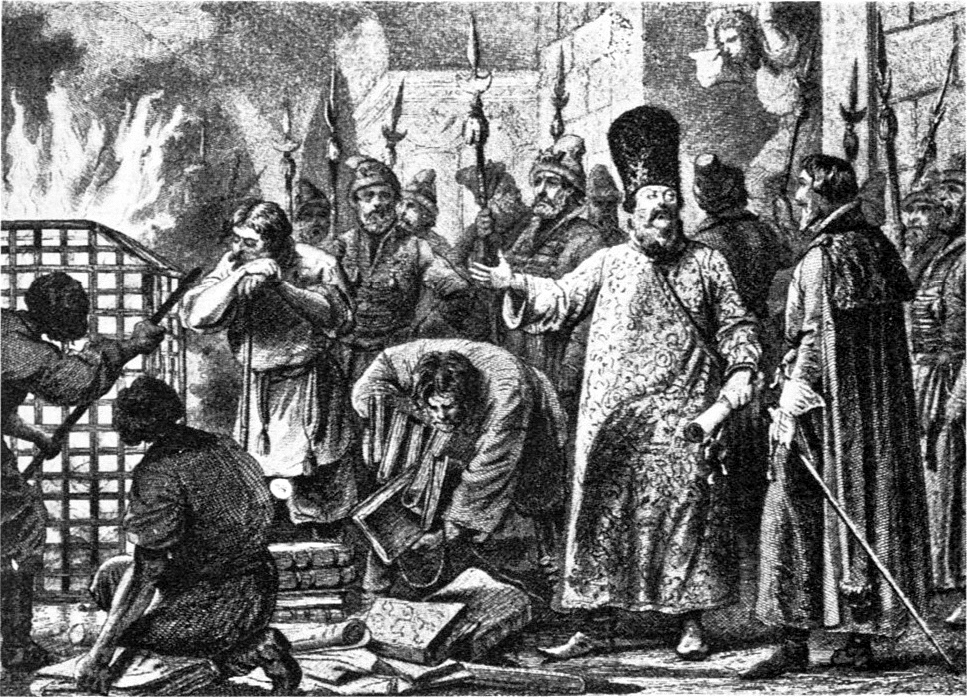
Burning the books of Razriady in 1682.

In Russian history, mestnichestvo (Russian: ме́стничество, IPA: [ˈmʲesʲtʲnʲɪtɕɪstvə]; from ме́сто, a position) was a feudal hierarchical system in Russia from the 15th to 17th centuries.

Mestnichestvo was a complicated system of seniority which dictated which government posts a boyar could occupy. It was based on the individual's seniority within an extended Russian aristocratic family on the one hand, and on the order of precedence of the families, on the other. The hierarchy of families was calculated based on the historical records of senior appointments, going back to 1475 (Razriady). For example, the Odoevsky clan was ranked higher than the Buturlins, but a senior Buturlin could be appointed to a position equivalent to that occupied by a junior Odoevsky. The mestnichestvo system was most visibly represented in the order of seating of boyars at the tsar's table. The clans jealously guarded their status. This often led to bitter disputes and physical violence among nobles about their ancestry and their services to the monarch. According to eminent Russian 19th-century historian Vasily Klyuchevsky, "you could beat a boyar up, you could take away his property, you could expel him from government service, but you could never make him accept an appointment or a seat at the tsar's table lower than what he is entitled to."

Because of the mestnichestvo, otherwise qualified people who could not boast of sufficiently extended ancestry had no hope of getting an important state post. Additionally, a boyar from an old and respected family could get an important promotion even if personally unqualified.

With the developing autocracy, where the core principle was the creation of a central bureaucracy reporting directly to the tsar, the role of the mestnichestvo was progressively reduced. Moreover, increasing defense needs required that the top military posts be occupied by capable officers, not ancestry-proud but inept boyars. Consequently, the mestnichestvo was abolished in 1682 by Feodor III of Russia. The available genealogical data was made public as the so-called Velvet Book, whereas the ancient pedigree books were burnt, to the great consternation and dismay of established boyar families.

The abolition made it easier later for Peter the Great to reform and govern the state. However, one can not neglect the positive effects as ensuring elite loyalty and thus political cohesion and stability. Also, the state may have had more flexibility in appointments than critics of the system have suggested. Tsars were able to make appointments outside the mestnichestvo system which created positions as bez mest, or "without [reserved] places".

== See also ==
- Russian rank titles during the sixteenth and seventeenth centuries

== Sources ==
- "Местничество" . Brockhaus and Efron Encyclopedic Dictionary (in Russian). 1906.
- Great Soviet Encyclopedia
