= Marfino, Ustyuzhensky District, Vologda Oblast =

Marfino Марфино
- Village
- Location within Vologda Oblast Location within Russia
- Coordinates: 58°55′N 36°15′E
- Country: Russia
- Region: Vologda Oblast
- District: Ustyuzhensky District
- Time zone: UTC+3:00

Marfino (Russian: Марфино) is a rural locality (a village) in Mezzhenskoye Rural Settlement, Ustyuzhensky District, Vologda Oblast, Russia. The population was 13 as of 2002.

== Geography ==
Marfino is located 15 km (9.3 mi) northwest of Ustyuzhna (the district's administrative centre) by road. Mochala is the nearest rural locality.
