= Marfino, Vologodsky District, Vologda Oblast =

Marfino Марфино
- Village
- Nickname: yelitny posiolok
- Location within Vologda Oblast Location within Russia
- Coordinates: 59°16′N 39°41′E
- Country: Russia
- Region: Vologda Oblast
- District: Vologodsky District
- Time zone: UTC+3:00

Marfino (Russian: Марфино) is a rural locality (a village) in Novlenskoye Rural Settlement, Vologodsky District, Vologda Oblast, Russia. The population was 298 as of 2002. There are 18 streets.

== Geography ==
Marfino is located 14 km northwest of Vologda (the district's administrative centre) by road. Semyonkovo , Yagody is the nearest rural locality.
