= Karpov (Russian family) =

Russian noble family

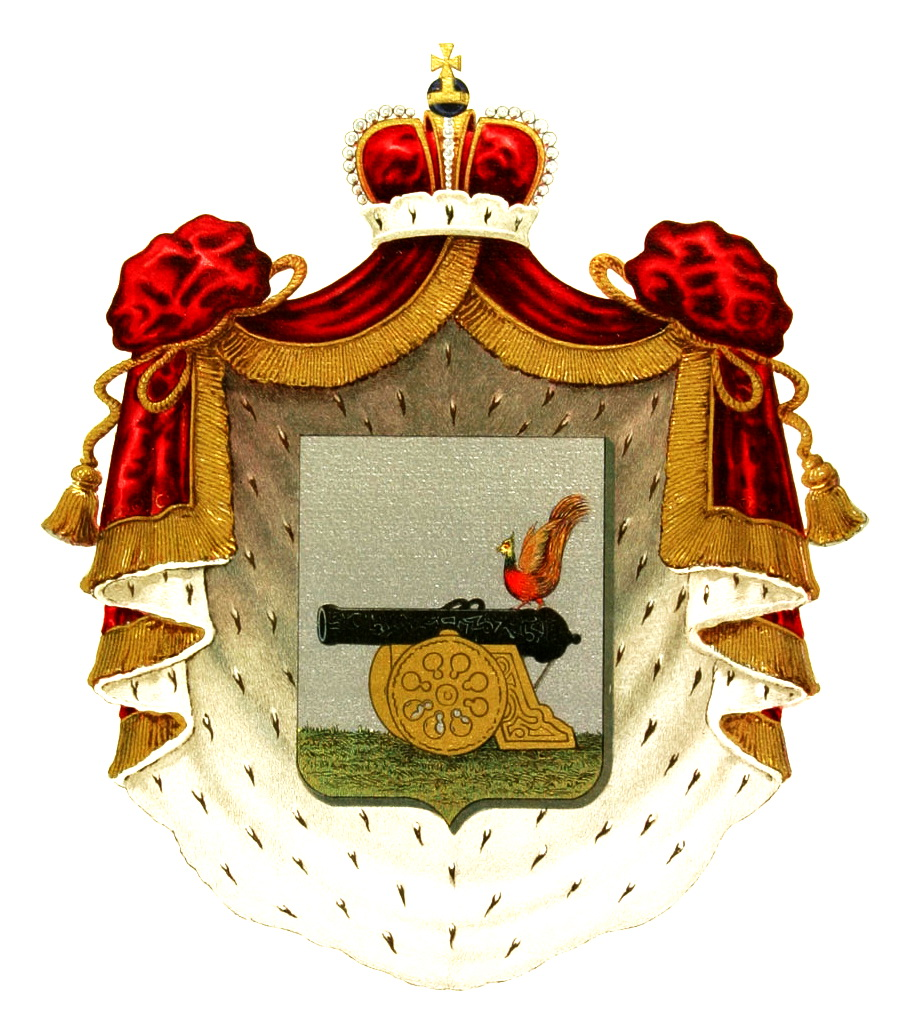
- Coat of arms of the Karpov family
- Country: Grand Duchy of Moscow, Russian Empire
- Current region: Kaluga Oblast, Kursk Oblast, Donetsk Oblast
- Founder: Fyodor Karpov

The Karpov family is a Russian noble family, traditionally believed to descend from Rurik through a branch of the Smolensk princes.

== Etymology ==
The surname Karpov is derived from the Greek word karpos (καρπός), meaning "fruit" or "harvest". The name is also associated with Saint Carpus, one of the Seventy Apostles mentioned in early Christian tradition (2 Timothy 4:13), whose name was commonly adopted in regions of the Russian Empire.

== Coat of arms ==
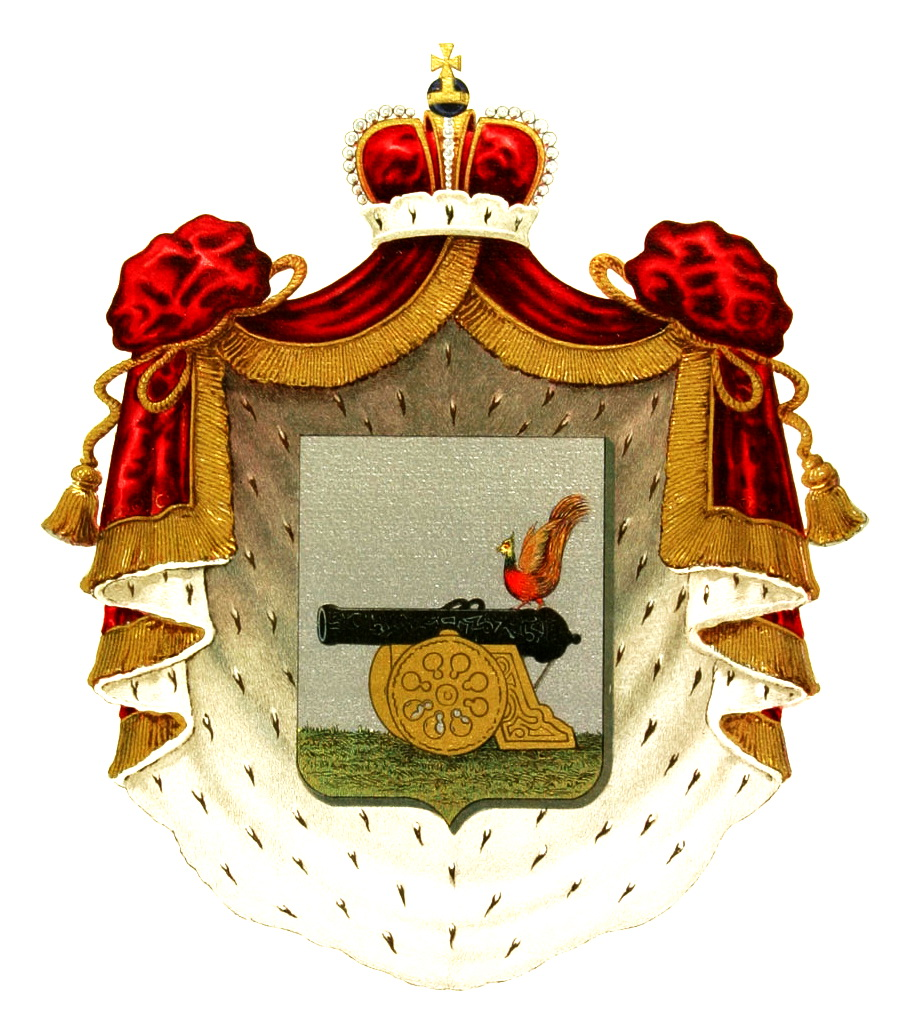
Coat of Arms of the Karpov family

The coat of arms of the Karpov family features a black cannon mounted on a golden gun carriage, resting on a field of grass within a silver shield. A bird-of-paradise is perched atop the cannon. The shield is adorned with a prince's mantle and cap, signifying princely dignity. Both the mantle and the cap were granted to the Karpov family on account of their descent from the Princes of Smolensk. Accordingly, the shield also incorporates the heraldic elements of the Smolensk princely arms.

== History ==
The Karpov family is an old Russian noble lineage that traces its roots to several branches across the Russian Empire, with ties to the Rurikid dynasty through the Smolensk princes. Early members of the family appear in 16th and 17th-century service records: Klementy Repchuk Karpov is listed among landed gentry in 1556; Prokofy Danilovich Karpov served as a court noble in Moscow and was later awarded land and honorary charters for military valour and city defence under Tsar Alexei Mikhailovich in 1659. Over time, members of the Karpov family served the Russian state in various high-ranking positions, stolniks, voivodes, and okolnichy, and were repeatedly granted estates for their service. These genealogical claims are supported by entries in the Velvet Book, the Karpov family genealogy, Russian imperial archives, and the Nobility Register of Nizhny Novgorod.

The earliest documented ancestor of the Saratov branch is Fyodor Tretyakov Karpov (1674–1719), a strelets centurion and progenitor of the Bakhmut branch, who was granted land near Yaroslavl in 1631. His descendants, including Kuzma Fyodorovich and Stepan Kuzmich, expanded the family's holdings, with Stepan's sons Alexander and Konstantin later serving in administrative and military roles during the 18th century. Their story unfolds in parallel with the colonization of Novorossiya under Catherine the Great, as the Russian Empire sought to populate and develop its southern frontiers.

By the late 17th century, another prominent branch had emerged in the Yekaterinoslav and Kharkov provinces, founded by Fyodor Karpov (1674–1719). His son, Ivan Fyodorovich (1703–1754), was admitted to the Preobrazhensky Regiment at the age of twelve, a sign of early state service and noble integration. Over successive generations, the Karpovs rose through the ranks of the Russian nobility by way of imperial military service, civil appointments, and strategically arranged marriages. From their early service in elite regiments such as the Preobrazhensky Guards to their acquisition of estates in Kharkiv and Bakhmut, the family steadily expanded its social and economic influence in southern Russia.

The family's rise accelerated with Ivan's grandson, Maxim Alekseevich Karpov (1747–1798), who fought under Prince Grigory Potemkin in the Russo-Turkish Wars and between 1787 and 1788, was granted estates in the Slavyansk and Bakhmut districts. Maxim settled these frontier lands in Novorossiya with soldiers from his regiment, establishing a base of landownership and regional influence. Maxim's son, Alexei Maksimovich Karpov (1775–1839), consolidated the family's holdings through marriage to Lyubov Nikitichna Kotlyarevskaya, granddaughter of Russian diplomat Pyotr Kovalensky, who, following political rehabilitation under Emperor Alexander I, had been granted substantial estates in southern Russia.

Members of the Karpov family, such as Maxim Alekseevich, were granted land for their military achievements in the Russo-Turkish Wars and brought entire veteran communities with them to settle the steppe. By the 19th century, the family's fortunes were deeply tied to the economic transformation of the Donbas, where they helped pioneer coal mining operations and industrial infrastructure. In the political sphere, they served as nobles and members of the State Council, reflecting their integration into the imperial elite. Over the 19th century, the Karpovs expanded their estates across Kharkov, Bakhmut, and Saratov. Strategic marriage alliances, military service in elite regiments, and roles in regional administration reinforced their aristocratic standing.

The family's prominence continued into the industrial age. Pyotr Aleksandrovich Karpov (1834–1903), a graduate of the General Staff Academy and a landowner of Trudovoe, founded the Voznesensky coal mine near Donetsk, which by the early 20th century employed 3,500 workers and produced over 600,000 tons of coal annually. The Karpovs contributed to the economic transformation of the Donbas and played a role in zemstvo governance and imperial service. Descendants such as Viktor Ivanovich Karpov attained the rank of Privy Councilor and membership in the State Council.

== Bakhmut branch ==
The Bakhmut branch of the Karpov family emerged as one of the most prominent noble-industrial dynasties in southern Russia during the 18th and 19th centuries. This line traces its origins to Fyodor Karpov, Ivan, and Maxim Alekseevich Karpov. Maxim's son, Alexei Maksimovich Karpov (1775–1839), solidified the family's position through marriage to Lyubov Nikitichna Kotlyarevskaya, the granddaughter of Russian diplomat Pyotr Ivanovich Kovalensky. Kovalensky had been dismissed under Emperor Paul I but was later rehabilitated by Alexander I, who granted him estates in Novorossiya. These lands, combined with existing family holdings like Alekseyevka and later Karpovka, became the economic and symbolic heart of the Bakhmut Karpovs. A large stone manor was constructed in Alekseyevka, while Karpovka remained modest, typical of rural southern estates.

The next generation included Ivan, Alexander, and Pyotr Aleksandrovich Karpov. Ivan managed family lands and married into the Zhukovsky estate of Sofievka but fell into financial ruin due to extravagant projects, including hiring an Italian architect and a German landscape designer to build a grand estate, which he later lost through divorce. His sons, however, achieved distinction: Viktor Ivanovich became a Privy Councillor and member of the State Council, while Konstantin Ivanovich was repeatedly elected district leader of the nobility and became Chamberlain to Tsar Nicholas II.

Another influential figure of this branch was Pyotr Aleksandrovich Karpov (1838–1903). Educated at the First Moscow Cadet Corps and the Nikolaev Academy of the General Staff, he graduated with first-class honors and joined the elite General Staff. Pyotr returned to Bakhmut, where he took over the Trudovoe estate and began to industrialize the region.

In 1872, he established a distillery that produced vodka from rye and barley, with 50 workers and sales extending across Bakhmut and Mariupol. But his most significant achievement was founding the Voznesensky coal mine near Mandrykino station. Encouraged by engineer Alexander Auerbach, Pyotr conducted geological surveys, uncovering high-quality steam coal and later iron ore. Lacking capital to build a full-scale mine, he entered a revenue-sharing agreement with contractor Ignatiy Prokhorov, who developed the mine while paying Karpov a royalty per pood of coal.

By the early 20th century, the Voznesensky mine had grown into a major industrial complex with four mining and four ventilation shafts, producing over 600,000 tons of coal annually and employing 3,500 workers. Karpov built infrastructure to support this industrial boom: a school, hospital, church, library, and workers' housing. He refused to sell the mine to French investors for 8 million rubles, viewing it as a legacy of personal and scientific achievement.

Karpov was known for his public service and eccentric thrift. He insisted on being buried between his estate and mine, symbolizing his life's dual commitments. His crypt was desecrated during the Soviet era, but local oral history preserved his burial site. After his death, his daughters inherited Trudovoe, following a will that prioritized female succession.

The Bakhmut Karpovs represent a unique synthesis of nobility, entrepreneurship, and state service. Through education, military distinction, local governance, and industrial vision, they transformed the Bakhmut district into a center of economic activity while maintaining ties to their aristocratic lineage. While some members of the Karpov family remained on their lands in (what is now Eastern Ukraine), others emigrated during the upheavals of the Russian Revolution, establishing new branches of the family in Yugoslavia, France, and the United States.

== Kharkov merchant branch ==
A separate branch of the Karpov family rose to prominence in the late 18th century in Kharkov (modern-day Kharkiv, Ukraine), distinct from the noble and military lineages. This branch was founded by Artemy and Fedot Karpov, sons of a third-guild merchant from Elisavetgrad (now Kropyvnytskyi), who relocated to Kharkov in 1780 following the administrative transformation of the Sloboda-Ukrainian Governorate into the Kharkov Viceroyalty.

Artemy Dorofeyevich Karpov distinguished himself in public service. Despite adhering to the Old Believer faith, he was elected Kharkov's first mayor in 1784, serving two consecutive three-year terms. He was known for his legal acumen and independent political stance, often challenging both the provincial magistracy and higher imperial authorities.

His brother, Fedot Dorofeyevich Karpov, focused on commercial expansion. By the end of the 18th century, he had become the wealthiest merchant in Kharkov, accumulating prime real estate in the city center and outlying lands. In 1808, he too was elected city mayor. The family invested heavily in local infrastructure and trade, establishing a reputation for influence and ambition. Furthermore, the family's textile and dyeing factories in Zalopanskaya were among the earliest industrial sites in the city.

Fedot's son, Sergei Fedotovich Karpov, received an education in accounting in Danzig (now Gdańsk) and expanded the family's industrial holdings, becoming one of the wealthiest men in the region. By 1837, his central-city real estate alone was valued at over 550,000 rubles, dwarfing the municipal budget. Despite being elected mayor that year, Sergei declined the post, likely due to age.

The family's influence gradually waned by the end of the 19th century, as industrial capitalism shifted toward joint-stock firms and urban governance reforms curtailed individual merchant power. Nevertheless, the Karpovs remained philanthropic. Descendants such as Fyodor Sergeevich Karpov donated land for schools and churches, including the Moskalevka School (1873) and Karprovsky Garden, now a public space.

Another notable descendant, Vasily Parfentievich Karpov, the great-grandson of Artemy, pursued a cultural rather than commercial path. A painter and teacher, he was also a journalist who published memoirs under the pseudonym Don Basilio, later collected as Kharkov Antiquity: Memoirs of an Old Resident (1900).

Though their commercial empire eventually dissolved (with much of their central real estate sold to other merchants by the 1870s) the Karpovs continue to be associated with several city landmarks, including Karpovskaya Street and the Karprovsky Well, once a major source of drinking water in the city.

== Legacy ==
The Karpov family is remembered for blending traditional nobility and early industrial entrepreneurship in Imperial Russia. Their contributions to mining, governance, and education marked them as one of the key noble-industrial dynasties of southern Russia before the Revolution. Various branches of the Karpov family are remembered for their service to the Russian Empire, their pioneering role in the development of Donbas coal mining, and their architectural and philanthropic contributions across southern Russia.
