= Starkov (surname) =

Starkov (Russian: Старков) is a Russian masculine surname. Its feminine counterpart is Starkova. In Latvia, it is spelled as Starkovs. Notable people with the surname include:

- Aleksandrs Starkovs (born 1957), Latvian-Russian football coach
- Anatoly Starkov (born 1946), Russian Olympic cyclist
- Diana Starkova (born 1998), French model
- Ivan Starkov (born 1986), Russian footballer
- Kirill Starkov (born 1987), Danish-Russian ice hockey player
- Vadim Starkov (born 1979), Russian footballer

== Fictional characters ==
- Alina Starkov from the Grisha trilogy
