= Kvashnin-Samarin =

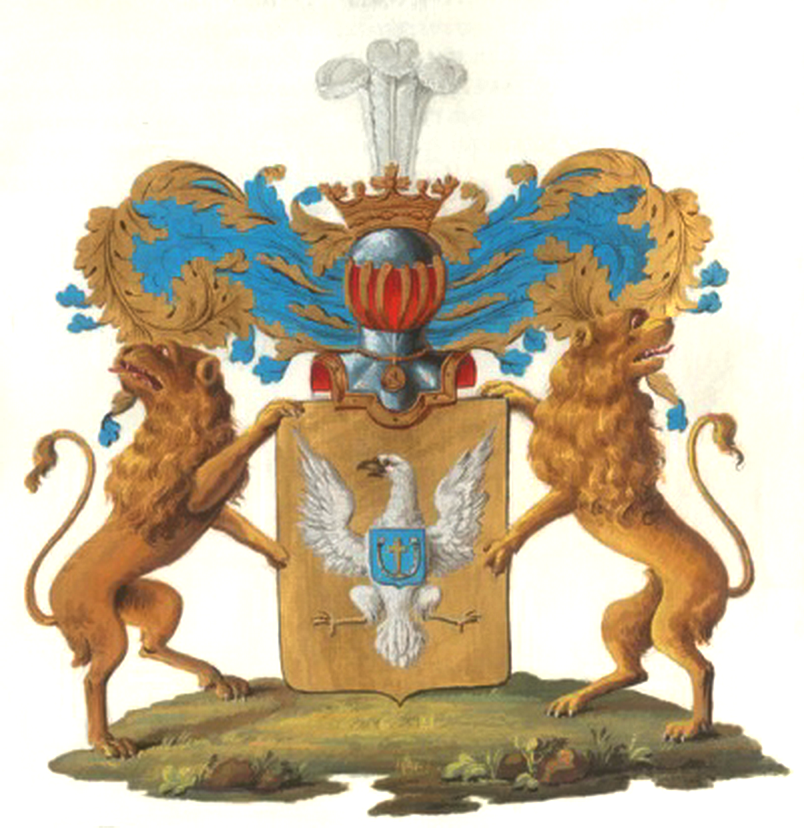
- Alternative name(s): Samarin
- Earliest mention: 1282
- Cities: Krasny, Staryi Merchyk, Russian Empire

The Kvashnins-Samarin family is an ancient Russian noble family. Members of the family were written as Kvashnin-Samarin up until the 17th century, where some began to be written only as Samarin. This family shares the same origin with noble families Kvashnin, Samarin, Razladin and Tushin.

== Origins and History ==
The ancestor of the family, Nester Ryabets, arrived in Moscow (about 1300) from the land of Red Ruthenia, where it is mentioned (1282) among the boyars of the Leo I of Galicia. A squad of 1,700 people came with him. His son Rodion Nestorovich, a boyar under the Grand Duke Ivan Kalita, a famous warrior. Ivan Rodionovich, a famous boyar warrior.

The great-grandson of Ivan Rodionovich Kvashny, Stepan Rodionovich Samara, was the ancestor of the Samarins and Kvashnins-Samarins and is mentioned at the wedding of Princess Sofia Ivanovna, daughter of Ivan III of Russia to Prince Vasily Kholmsky (February 13, 1500).

== Coat of Arms ==
The shield, which has a golden field, depicts a white one-headed eagle with outstretched wings, which has a golden cross on its chest on a small blue shield, placed on a silver horseshoe facing upwards (Jastrzębiec coat of arms).

The shield is crowned with an ordinary noble helmet with a noble crown on it and three ostrich feathers. The basting on the shield is gold, enclosed in blue. Shield holders: two lions looking to the sides with curled tails. The coat of arms of the Kvashnin-Samarin family is included in Part 2 of the General coat of arms of the noble families of the All-Russian Empire, p. 39

== Notable Members ==
- Vasily Ivanovich Kvashnin-Samarin - 1st Voivode of the Ertaul regiment in the Kazan campaign (1544).
- Mikhail Ivanovich Kvashnin-Samarin - Voivode of the Guard Regiment in the Polotsk campaign (1551).
- Mikhail, Pyotr Andreevich, Prokofy Vasilievich Kvashnins-Samarin - the stewards of Tsarina Praskovia Saltykova (1692).
- Timofey Vasilievich and Timofey Lukich Kvashnins-Samarin - Moscow noblemen (1692-1694).
- Andrey Nikitich and Prokofy Vasilievich Kvashnins-Samarin - Pantlers (1692).
- Pyotr Timofeevich Kvashnin-Samarin - master of arms (1742).
- Fyodor Petrovich Kvashnin-Samarin - Master of Heralds (since 1755), President of the Chief Magistrate in Moscow.
- Pyotr Fedorovich Kvashnin-Samarin - President of the Collegium of Justice under Catherine the Great, and Paul I of Russia - Senator (1786 -1793) - Governor in the Novgorod Viceroyalty.
- Andrey Nikitich Kvashnin-Samarin (1764-1770) - state councilor - governor of Kazan province.
- Alexander Petrovich Kvashnin-Samarin (1732-1816) - lieutenant general (1806), head of the Oryol governorship (1794-1796), 1st Oryol governor (1796-1797).
- Nikolai Nikolaevich Kvashnin-Samarin (1883-1920) - Colonel of the Preobrazhensky Life Guards Regiment, Knight of St. George.
- Nikolai Dmitrievich Kvashnin-Samarin (1841 - not earlier than 1918) - historian, philologist, ethnographer.
- Stepan Dmitrievich Kvashnin-Samarin (1838-1908) - statesman and public figure, member of the State Council, full state councilor.
- Elizaveta Petrovna Kvashnina-Samarina (married to Chernyshev; 1773–1828) - wife of Count GI Chernyshev, a lady of the Order of Saint Catherine of the Lesser Cross.
- Elizaveta Petrovna Kvashnina-Samarina (married to Rodzianko; 1794–1877) - head of the Catherine Institute .
