= Marfino, Mytishchinsky District, Moscow Oblast =

Russian demographic area

Coordinates: 56°04′26″N 37°33′32″E

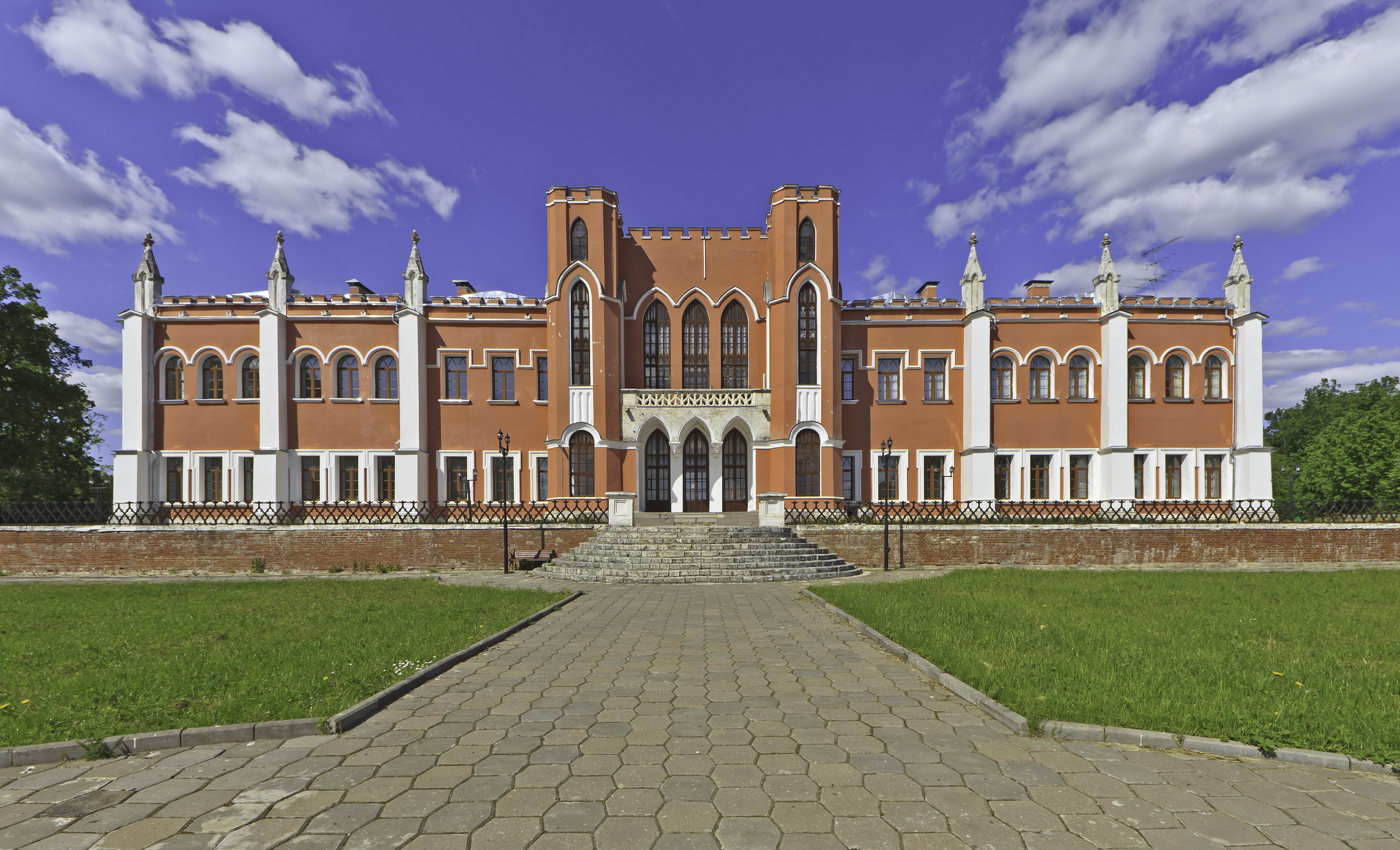
Marfino Palace

Marfino is a rural locality (a selo) in Fedoskinskoye Rural Settlement of Mytishchinsky District, Moscow Oblast, Russia, located several kilometers northeast of the town of Lobnya, on the right bank of the Ucha River. The selo is notable for an old aristocratic estate.

== History ==
Marfino has been known since the 16th century. It originally belonged to the Golovins, then was sold to dyak Semyon Zaborovsky in 1650, and in 1698, Boris Golitsyn, a mentor of the future Emperor Peter the Great, bought the estate. The earliest surviving buildings in Marfino originate from the Golitsyn's period, between 1698 and 1714. Golitsyn also was the one to rename the village Marfino, after his wife Marfa. The son of Golitsyn sold the estate in 1729 to Count Pyotr Saltykov. Much of the existing ensemble of the estate, which includes buildings and a park, was designed during the period when the Saltykovs owned the estate. They also turned the estate into a cultural center and organized stage and music performances which attracted visitors from Moscow. In 1805, the estate owner died and the estate started to decay. In 1812, during the French invasion of Russia, it was looted by the French army. Subsequently, it was restored and changed hands several times. In the 1840s, the house was rebuilt as a medieval Gothic castle by the architect Mikhail Bykovsky.

After the revolution of 1917, the estate was nationalized. In 1933, it was transferred under the Ministry of Defense and currently hosts a sanatorium.

== Architecture ==
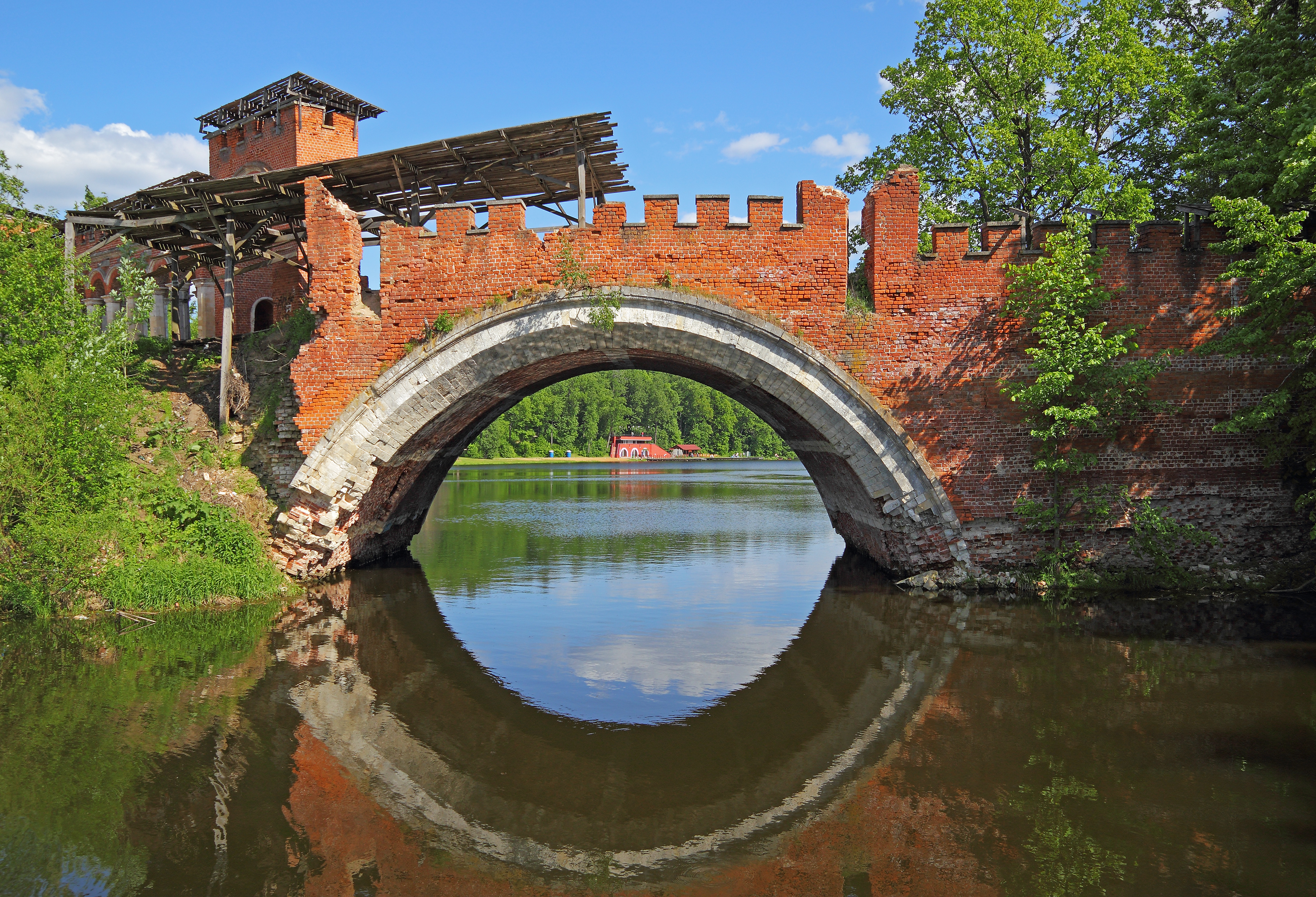
Grand Bridge

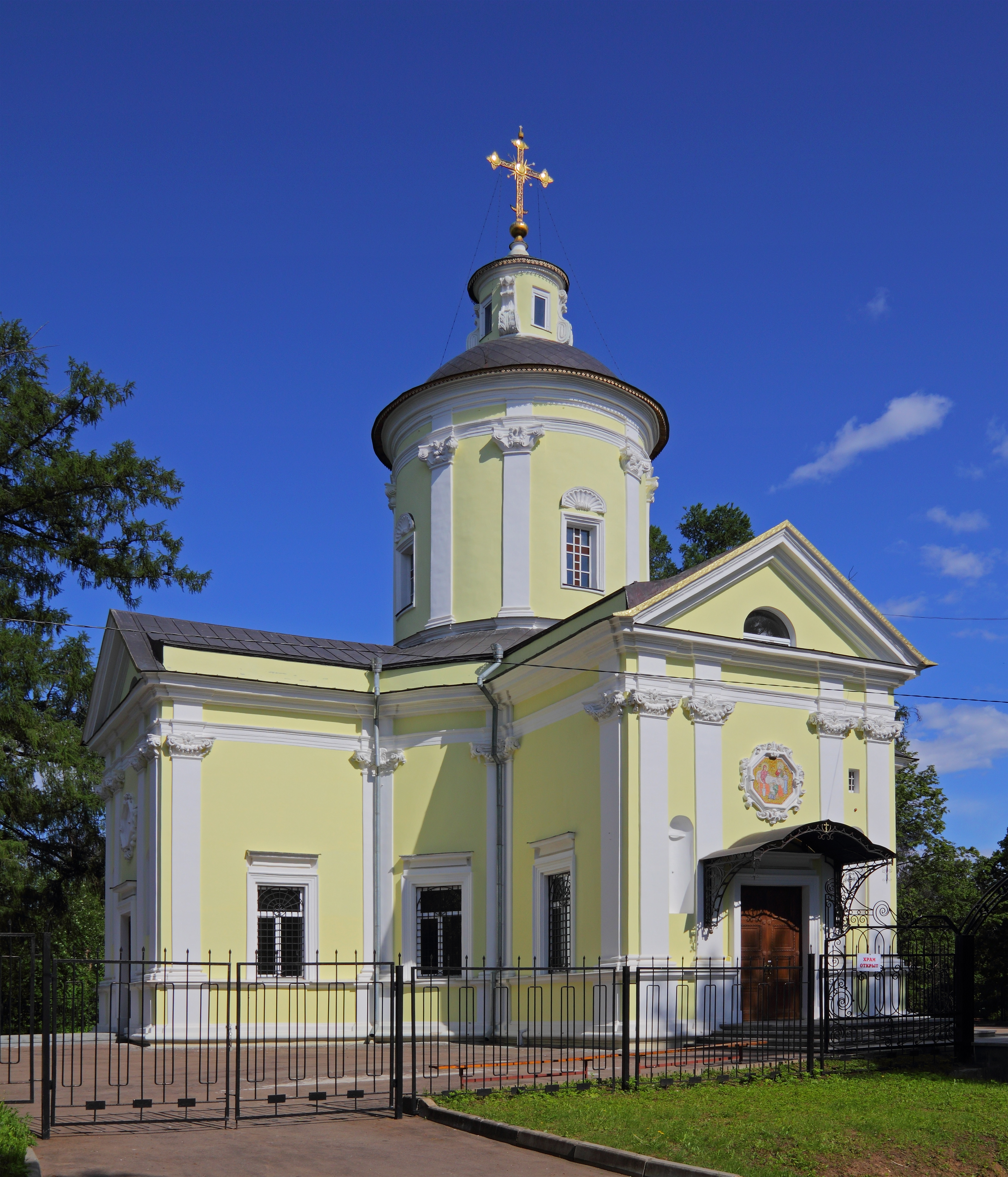
The Church of the Nativity of the Theotokos

The Marfino estate contains a landscape park and a number of buildings constructed in different styles.

The oldest remaining building is the Church of the Nativity of the Theotokos, built in 1707 by the architect Vladimir Belozerov. Belozerov was a serf of Golitsyn who sent him to France to study architecture. He built a church in a style close to European Baroque. Golitsyn was not content with the church and had Belozerov to be whipped.

A gazebo, a pavilion, and two symmetrically located kennels survive from the Saltykov's time.

The main house (sometimes referred to as a palace) was built in the 18th century, but was completely rearranged by Bykovsky in the 1830s in the Gothic revival style. The brick house has two floors and a rectangular shape. Two more houses are located at the sides. A staircase descends from the palace to the pond, and the bridge over the pond, originally built in the 18th century, was also remodeled by Bykovsky. In addition, Bykovsky built the landscape park.

== Transportation ==
Marfino is connected by a paved road with the A104 Highway, which connects Moscow and Dubna via Dmitrov. Bus routes connect Marfino with Lobnya, Mytishchi, and Moscow (Altufyevo metro station).

The closest railway platform is Katuar several kilometers to the west. It is a part of the Savoyolovsky suburban direction of Moscow Railway.
