= Velvet Book =

Official register of Russian nobility

The Velvet Book (Russian: Бархатная книга, romanized: Barkhatnaya kniga) was an official register of genealogies of Russia's most noble families (Russian nobility). The book is bound in red velvet, hence the name. It was compiled during the regency of Sophia (1682–1687) after Tsar Fyodor III of Russia abolished the old system of ranks (mestnichestvo) and all the ancient pedigree books had been burnt to prevent contention between the feuding aristocratic clans.

The Velvet Book includes the ancient genealogical register from 1555 (Gosudarev Rodoslovets) featuring the family trees of Rurikid and Gediminid princely houses. An important addendum contains a set of genealogies prepared by the non-princely noble families on the basis of their family records. As it was fashionable to trace one's blood line back to a foreign immigrant, all sorts of fantasy genealogies abound.

The Velvet Book first appeared in print in 1787: Nikolai Novikov prepared the first edition at the Moscow University Press. The book has also appeared in an online version.

== See also ==
List of families included in Velvet Book
