= List of burials and memorials in the Annunciation Church of the Alexander Nevsky Lavra =

Coordinates: 59°55′22.8″N 30°23′02.4″E

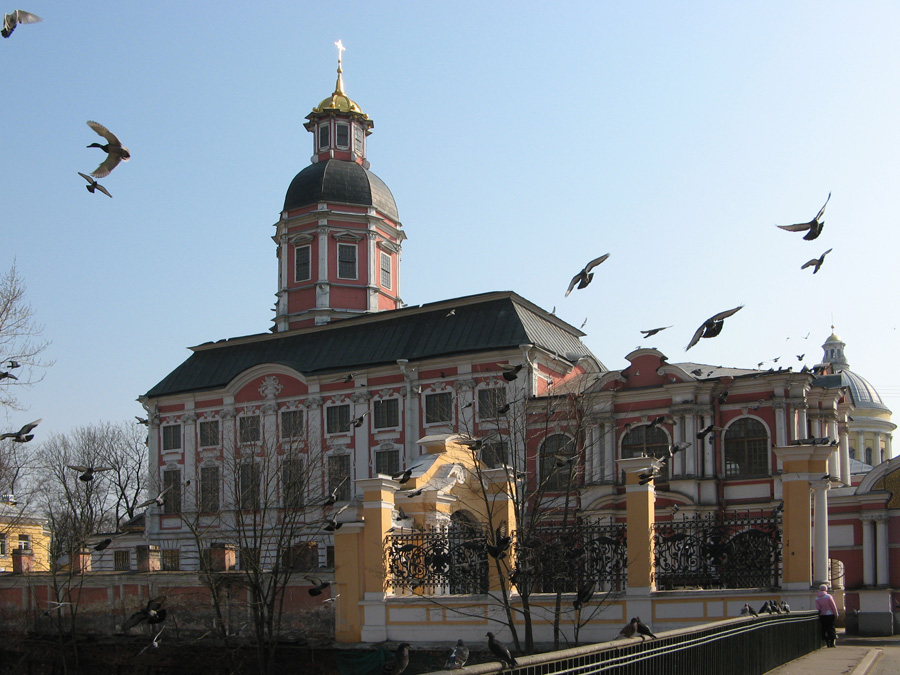
The exterior of the Annunciation Church of the Alexander Nevsky Lavra

The Annunciation Church of the Alexander Nevsky Lavra (Russian: Благовещенская церковь Александро-Невской лавры) is a historic church in the centre of Saint Petersburg. It is part of the monastic complex of the Alexander Nevsky Lavra and contains a large number of burials dating back to the founding of the city, as well as monuments and memorials to notable figures that were brought to the church from other locations during the Soviet period.

== Design and construction ==
Construction of the church, designed by Domenico Trezzini, began in 1717. It was initially planned that the ground floor would house the monastery's refectory, but this was altered to instead create a burial space for members of the royal family and prominent dignitaries. As completed the building contained two churches. The upper, dedicated to Saint Alexander Nevsky and used to hold his relics on their arrival into the city, was consecrated in 1724. The lower, dedicated to the Annunciation of the Virgin Mary, was consecrated in 1725. Underneath the building was a burial vault constructed in 1720.

== Imperial burials ==
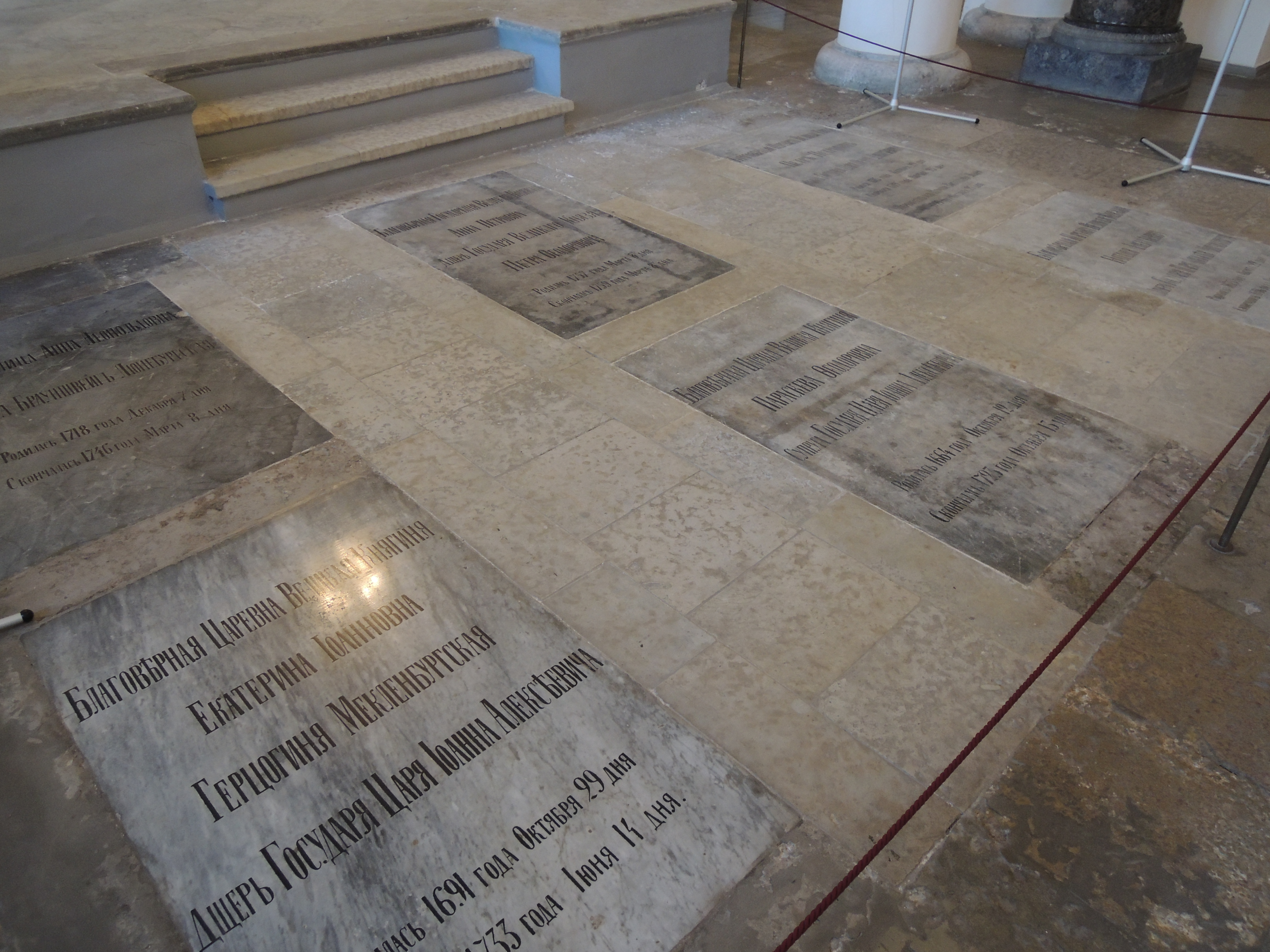
Gravemarkers of the Romanov family members

The first interment was that of Tsarina Praskovia Saltykova, the wife of Tsar Ivan V, on 24 October 1723. On Peter's orders the remains of his sister, Natalya Alexeyevna, and his infant son Peter Petrovich, who had originally been buried in the monastery's Lazarevsky Church, were transferred to the burial vault. Several other members of the imperial family were later buried in the church, including those who had lost their positions through palace coups. Among them were Anna Leopoldovna, mother of Tsar Ivan VI and regent during her son's brief reign; and Emperor Peter III who was deposed and killed in a palace coup that brought his wife to the throne as Empress Catherine II. Peter III was quietly interred in the church in July 1762, thus denying him burial in the traditional resting place of the post-Peter the Great rulers, the Saints Peter and Paul Cathedral. Peter III's remains were later removed from the church and reburied in the Saints Peter and Paul Cathedral on the orders of his son when he ascended to the throne as Paul I. Other members of the imperial family buried in the church include Catherine Ivanovna, Peter the Great's niece; Natalia Alexeievna, Paul I's first wife; and several children who died in infancy, including two daughters of Emperor Alexander I and Elizabeth Alexeievna; Olga Pavlovna, daughter of Emperor Paul I and Maria Feodorovna.

Those with close connections to the imperial court were also buried here. Among them were courtiers Yevdokiya Yusupova, Anastasiya Trubetskaya, and Anna Matyushkina; as well as Alexei Razumovsky, lover and rumoured husband of Empress Elizabeth; and Maria Rumyantseva, mistress of Peter the Great. Members of several important noble families were also buried here, including the Shuvalovs, Betskoys, Vyazemskys, Naryshkins, and Yusupovs. On 12 May 1800 the hero of the French Revolutionary Wars Generalissimo Alexander Suvorov was buried in the church, under a white marble slab with the simple inscription, chosen by the Generalissimo himself, "Here lies Suvorov". An extension along the south-eastern part of the church was built in 1783, which came to house the family monuments of several noble houses, including the Shuvalovs, Betskoys, Vyazemskys and Naryshkins. A small sacristy was attached to the eastern side of the church, which later housed the Yusupov family's monuments. In the 1860s the Yakunchikov family had a small crypt built in the church's north-western corner, and in 1871 P. D. Sokhansky built a marble tomb for the Bobrinsky family under the staircase annex.

== Soviet museum ==
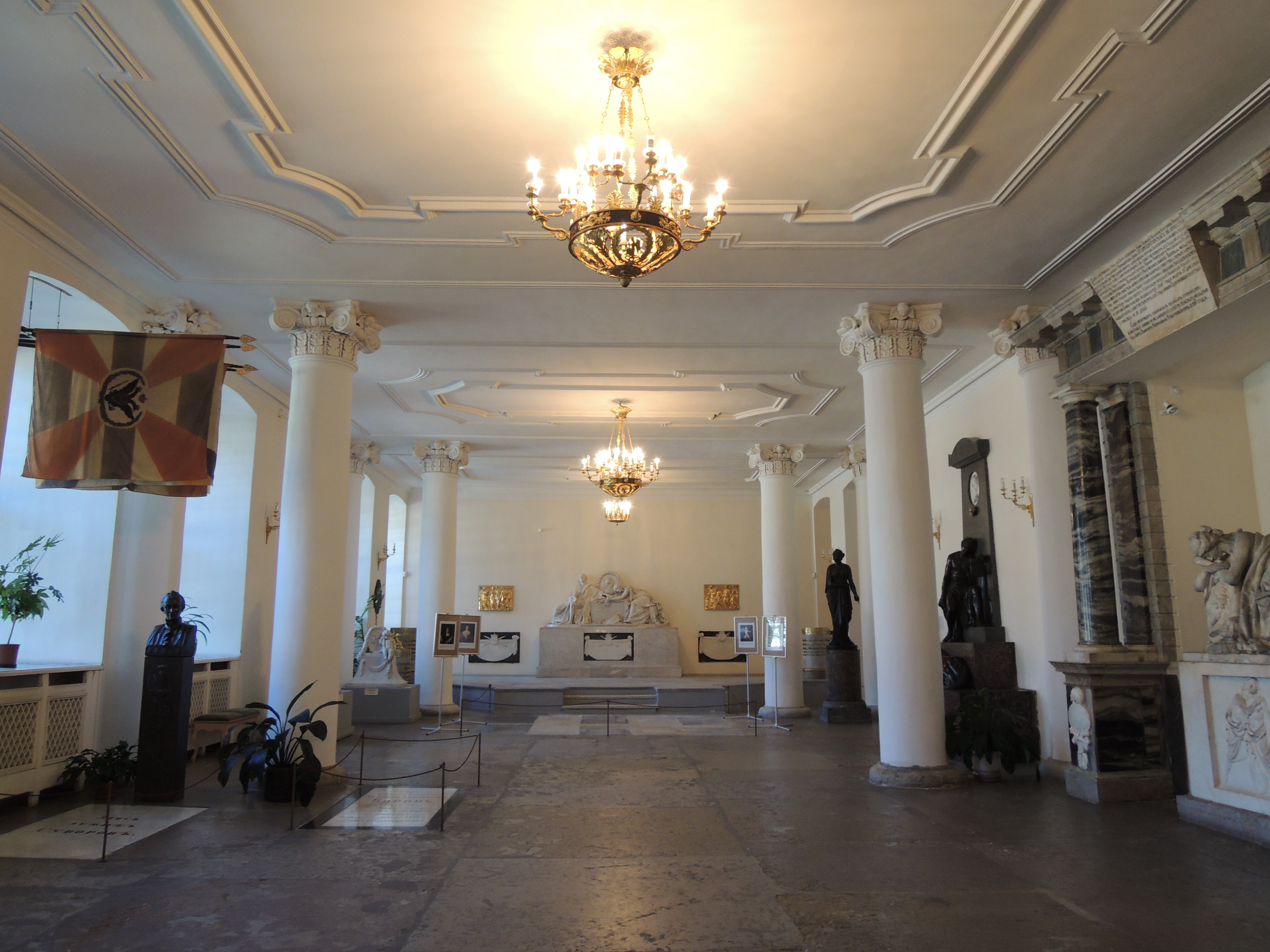
The lower church, the grave of Alexander Suvorov at left.

Closed in 1933, the church was divided between office space and the forerunner of the State Museum of Urban Sculpture during the early Soviet period. During this period, some of the funerary monuments from the Lavra's Nikolo-Fyodorovskaya and Isidorovskaya churches, which had been closed in 1931, were moved to the lower Annunciation Church. In 1940, the entire building was transferred to the State Museum of Urban Sculpture. The memorials of Napoleonic military leaders Mikhail Miloradovich and Dmitry Senyavin were placed in the church after the closure of the Dukhovskaya Church, while those of Ivan Lazarev and Gerasim Lebedev were brought from other locations as part of a general clearing of cemeteries and the concentration of funerary monuments into centralised museum necropolises. In other instances parts of memorials, such as plaques and reliefs from the monuments of Alexei Turchaninov and Anna Vorontsova in the Lavra's Lazarevskoe Cemetery were installed in the church. In the case of sculptor Mikhail Kozlovsky, his monument was transferred from the Smolensky Cemetery to the Lazarevskoe in 1931, with some of the reliefs installed in the Annunciation Church.

On 15 May 1950, the building opened as a museum display of historic funerary monuments under the auspices of the State Museum of Urban Sculpture. On 7 April 2013, the 300th anniversary of the monastery, it was announced that the Annunciation Church would be returned to the Alexander Nevsky Lavra. The return of the church to the monastery authorities has however been complicated by questions around the ownership of the memorials.

== Originally buried in the church ==
=== House of Romanov ===
Image	Name	Born	Died	Occupation	Monument	Reference
	Anna Leopoldovna	1718	1746	Daughter of Tsarevna Catherine Ivanovna, mother of Emperor Ivan VI, regent of Russia.		
	Anna Petrovna	1757	1759	Daughter of Grand Duke Peter Fedorovich, the future Emperor Peter III, and Grand Duchess Yekaterina Alekseyevna, the future Empress Catherine the Great.		
	Catherine Ivanovna	1691	1733	Daughter of Tsar Ivan V and Praskovia Saltykova, eldest sister of Empress Anna of Russia, niece of Peter the Great, Duchess of Mecklenburg-Schwerin.		
	Natalya Alexeyevna	1673	1716	Daughter of Tsar Alexis and Natalya Naryshkina, sister of Peter the Great. Originally buried in the Lazarevskoe Church in 1717, reburied in the Annunciation Church in 1723.		
	Natalya Alexeyevna	1755	1776	Wife of Tsarevich Paul Petrovich, the future Tsar Paul I, daughter in law of Empress Catherine the Great.		
	Peter III	1728	1762	Emperor of Russia, son of Anna Petrovna and grandson of Peter the Great. Husband of Princess Sophie of Anhalt-Zerbst, who succeeded him as Catherine the Great. Remains transferred to the Peter and Paul Cathedral in 1796.		
	Praskovia Saltykova	1664	1723	Wife of Tsar Ivan V, mother of Empress Anna of Russia.		
	Elizabeth Alexandrovna	1806	1808	Daughter of Emperor Alexander I and Elizabeth Alexeievna.		
	Maria Alexandrovna	1799	1800	Daughter of Emperor Alexander I and Elizabeth Alexeievna.		
	Olga Pavlovna	1792	1795	Daughter of Emperor Paul I and Maria Feodorovna.		
	Peter Petrovich	1715	1719	Son of Peter the Great and Ekaterina Alekseyevna. Originally buried in the Lazarevskoe Church in 1719, reburied in the Annunciation Church in 1725.		

=== Georgian royalty ===
Image	Name	Born	Died	Occupation	Monument	Reference
	Vakhtang	1761	1814	Son of King Heraclius II and Queen Darejan Dadiani.		
	Darejan Dadiani	1738	1807	Queen Consort of King Heraclius II.		

=== Orthodox clergy ===
Image	Name	Born	Died	Occupation	Monument	Reference
	Vasilije Petrović	1709	1766	Metropolitan bishop of Cetinje, Prince-Bishop of Montenegro.		

=== Nobility ===
Image	Name	Born	Died	Occupation	Monument	Reference
	Ivan Betskoy	1704	1795	School reformer, advisor on education, President of the Imperial Academy of Arts, architect of Russia's first unified system of public education.		
	Alexander Bezborodko	1747	1799	Grand Chancellor of Russia, chief architect of Catherine the Great's foreign policy.		
	James Bruce	1732	1791	General, Commander of the Finland Division, Governor-General of Moscow and Saint Petersburg Governorate. Grave lost.		
	Ivan Chernyshyov	1726	1797	Diplomat, military leader, Field Marshal and General Admiral, Chief Plenipotentiary in London, vice-president of the Admiralty.		
	Mikhail Dolgorukov	1780	1808	Military leader, general. Finnish War, Battle of Virta Bridge.		
	Peter Dolgorukov	1777	1806	Military leader, general. Napoleonic Wars.		
	Vasily Dolgorukov	c. 1667	1746	Military leader and politician, Field Marshal, member of the Supreme Privy Council, president of the College of War. Grave lost.		
	Alexander Golitsyn	1718	1783	Field marshal, governor of Saint Petersburg, Seven Years' War, Russo-Turkish War		
	Ekaterina Golitsyna	1720	1761	Noble woman, maid of honour to Elizabeth of Russia.		
	Anna Matyushkina	1722	1804	Maid of honour to Elizabeth of Russia, lady in waiting to Empress Catherine the Great, chief lady in waiting to Empress Maria Feodorovna.		
	Lev Naryshkin	1733	1799	Courtier, Ober–Shtalmeyster, Naryshkin family, court joker and rake.		
	Lev Naryshkin	1785	1846	Military leader, general, Napoleonic Wars.		
	Yekaterina Naryshkina	1729	1771	State Lady, Order of Saint Catherine, wife of the last hetman of the Zaporizhian Host, Kirill Razumovsky		
	Ekaterina Orlova	1785	1846	Courtier, lady in waiting to Empress Catherine the Great, wife of Grigory Orlov.		
	Nikita Panin	1718	1783	Statesman, political mentor to Catherine the Great, Northern Alliance.		
	Tatiana Potemkina	1797	1869	Noblewoman, philanthropist. Daughter of Boris Golitsyn wife of Alexandr Potemkin. Funded restoration of Sviatohirsk Lavra. Grave lost.		
	Alexei Razumovsky	1709	1771	Registered Cossack, lover and rumoured husband of Empress Elizabeth of Russia.		
	Maria Rumyantseva	1699	1788	Lady in waiting, royal mistress of Peter the Great. Grave lost.		
	Ivan Shuvalov	1727	1797	Russian Enlightenment, first Russian Minister of Education.		
	Alexander Suvorov	1730	1800	Military leader, Generalissimo, Seven Years' War, Bar Confederation, Russo-Turkish War of 1768–1774, Russo-Turkish War of 1787–1792, French Revolutionary Wars.		
	Anastasiya Trubetskaya	1700	1755	Noblewoman, courtier, princess of Moldavia and landgravine of Hesse-Homburg, honorary member of the Imperial Russian family. Lady in waiting to Empress Elizabeth, noted philanthropist.		
	Sava Vladislavich	1669	1738	Merchant-adventurer and diplomat in the employ of Peter the Great. Treaty of Kiakhta.		
	Alexander Vyazemsky	1727	1793	Prosecutor General of the Senate.		
	Matvei Wielhorski	1794	1866	Cellist, patron and friend of Mikhail Glinka, and Robert and Clara Schumann.		
	Pavel Yaguzhinsky	1683	1736	Statesman and diplomat, associate of Peter the Great, Chamberlain, Ober-Stallmeister, General-in-chief, Attorney General.		
	Sergey Yaguzhinsky	1731	1806	Chamberlain, lieutenant general, industrialist.		
	Tatiana Yusupova	1769	1841	Courtier, maid of honour to Empress Catherine the Great, salons, jewel collector.		
	Yevdokiya Yusupova	1743	1780	Courtier, Duchess consort of Courland.		

== Memorials transferred from other sites during the Soviet period ==
Image	Name	Born	Died	Occupation	Monument	Reference
	Ivan Abamelik	1768	1828	Armenian nobleman, Abamelik family. Major general of artillery, Napoleonic Wars, battles of Austerlitz and Borodino. Monument transferred from the Smolensky Armenian Cemetery in 1936.		
	David	1767	1819	Georgian prince, writer and scholar, regent of the Kingdom of Kartli-Kakheti. Monument transferred from the Feodorovskaya Church in 1930.		
	Mikhail Kozlovsky	1753	1802	Sculptor, teacher, Professor of the Imperial Academy of Arts, Russian classicism. Originally buried in the Smolensky Cemetery, monument and remains transferred to the Lazarevskoe Cemetery in 1931, with part of relief to the Annunciation Church.		
	Ivan Lazarev	1735	1801	Jeweler, patron, Catherine the Great. Monument originally in the Smolensky Armenian Cemetery.		
	Gerasim Lebedev	1749	1817	Adventurer, linguist, translator, musician and writer. Pioneer of Indology. Monument originally in the Bolsheokhtinskoe Cemetery, tablet transferred in the 1930s.		
	Mikhail Miloradovich	1771	1825	Military leader, general, Napoleonic Wars, Italian and Swiss campaigns of 1799, Governor General of Saint Petersburg, Decembrist revolt. Monument transferred from the Dukhovskaya Church in 1937.		
	Dmitry Senyavin	1763	1831	Military leader, admiral, Napoleonic Wars, Second Archipelago Expedition. Monument transferred from the Dukhovskaya Church in 1937.		
	Alexei Turchaninov	c. 1774	1787	Business magnate and industrialist, metallurgist, philanthropist. Originally in the Lazarevskoe Cemetery, remains and monument still in there, two bronze reliefs to the Annunciation Church.		
	Anna Vorontsova	1722	1775	Lady in waiting, salonist and noble, cousin of Elizabeth of Russia. Wife of Chancellor Count Mikhail Illarionovich Vorontsov. Originally in the Lazarevskoe Cemetery.		
