= Grand Duchess Elizabeth Alexandrovna of Russia =

Russian grand duchess (1806–1808)

Grand Duchess Elizabeth Alexandrovna
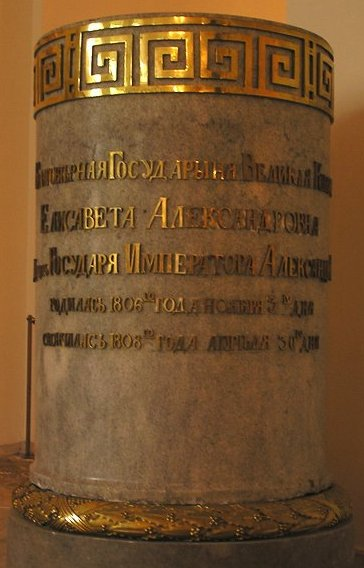
- Elizabeth's tombstone in Annunciation Church of the Alexander Nevsky Lavra, St. Petersburg. An identical tombstone rests above the tomb of her older sister, Grand Duchess Maria.
- Born: 15 November 1806; Winter Palace, Saint Petersburg, Russian Empire
- Died: 12 May 1808 (aged 1 year 5 months)
- Burial: Alexander Nevsky Lavra, Saint Petersburg
- House: Holstein-Gottorp-Romanov
- Father: Alexander I of Russia
- Mother: Elizabeth Alexeievna (Louise of Baden)

Grand Duchess Elizabeth Alexandrovna of Russia (Russian: Елисавета Александровна Романова, romanized: Elisaveta Aleksandrovna Romanova; 15 November [O.S. 3 November] 1806 – 12 May [O.S. 30 April] 1808) was the younger child of Alexander I of Russia and his wife, Empress consort Elizabeth Alexeievna.

== Birth ==
Grand Duchess Elizabeth was born at the Winter Palace in Saint Petersburg, the capital of the Russian Empire. Her father, Alexander I Pavlovich, was the reigning Russian Emperor. Her mother, Empress Elizabeth Alexeievna, was born Princess Louise of Baden.

The Empress had given birth to another daughter while her husband was still the heir to the Russian throne. This daughter, Grand Duchess Maria Alexandrovna (1799–1800), had died after just having reached the age of one. Maria's death had been a devastating blow to the Empress, who did not have another child for six years. At the time of Elizabeth's birth, she was rumored to have been the natural daughter of Empress Elizabeth by Alexei Okhotnikov, just as it had been rumored that Maria was the daughter of the Empress by Adam Jerzy Czartoryski, a Polish prince. Soon after Elizabeth's birth, the Empress wrote to her mother: "I am well, my good Mama, as is my little Elise, who begs you to forgive her for not being a boy."

== Death ==
After Okhotnikov's death, the Empress started to shower affection onto her infant daughter, whom she called either "Elise" or "Lisinka". In early 1808, Elizabeth started to show signs of an infection; this infection was blamed on teething. On 12 May [O.S. 30 April] 1808, aged 1 year 5 months, Elizabeth died of this infection. Her mother was inconsolable: she wrote to her mother that "now, [she] is not good for anything in this world, [her] soul has no more strength to recover from this last blow." She also wrote: "I have the illusion of spring in my apartment, the illusion of sunshine, flowers, singing birds, the birds that belong to Lisinka. She was often amused by her bullfinches: One of them whistles perfectly an air which I should never forget if I lived to be a hundred." When a doctor told the Emperor that his wife was still young enough to bear other children, the Emperor responded: "No, my friend, God does not love my children." The infant was buried in Annunciation Church of the Alexander Nevsky Lavra, in Saint Petersburg.

== Ancestry ==
Family of Grand Duchess Elizabeth Alexandrovna of Russia

8. Peter III of Russia
4. Paul I of Russia
9. Catherine the Great
2. Alexander I of Russia
10. Frederick II Eugene, Duke of Württemberg
5. Duchess Sophie Dorothea of Württemberg
11. Princess Friederike of Brandenburg-Schwedt
1. Grand Duchess Elizabeth Alexandrovna of Russia
12. Charles Frederick, Grand Duke of Baden
6. Charles Louis, Hereditary Prince of Baden
13. Princess Caroline Louise of Hesse-Darmstadt
3. Princess Louise of Baden
14. Louis IX, Landgrave of Hesse-Darmstadt
7. Princess Amalie of Hesse-Darmstadt
15. Countess Palatine Caroline of Zweibrücken

== Bibliography ==
- Krasnolutsky, Alexander (2010). Romanov Imperial Genealogy (PDF). Saint Petersburg.
- Troyat, Henri (2003). Alexander of Russia: Napoleon's Conqueror. New York City: Grove Press. ISBN 0-8021-3949-3.
- Zawadzki, W. H. (1993). A Man of Honour: Adam Czartoryski as a Statesman of Russia and Poland, 1795–1831. United States: Oxford University Press. ISBN 0-19-820303-9.
- Zeepvat, Charlotte (2005). The Camera And the Tsars. Sutton Publishing. ISBN 0-7509-4210-X.
