= Lev Naryshkin (1733) =

Russian favourite of Peter III (1733-1799)

Lev Aleksandrovich Naryshkin
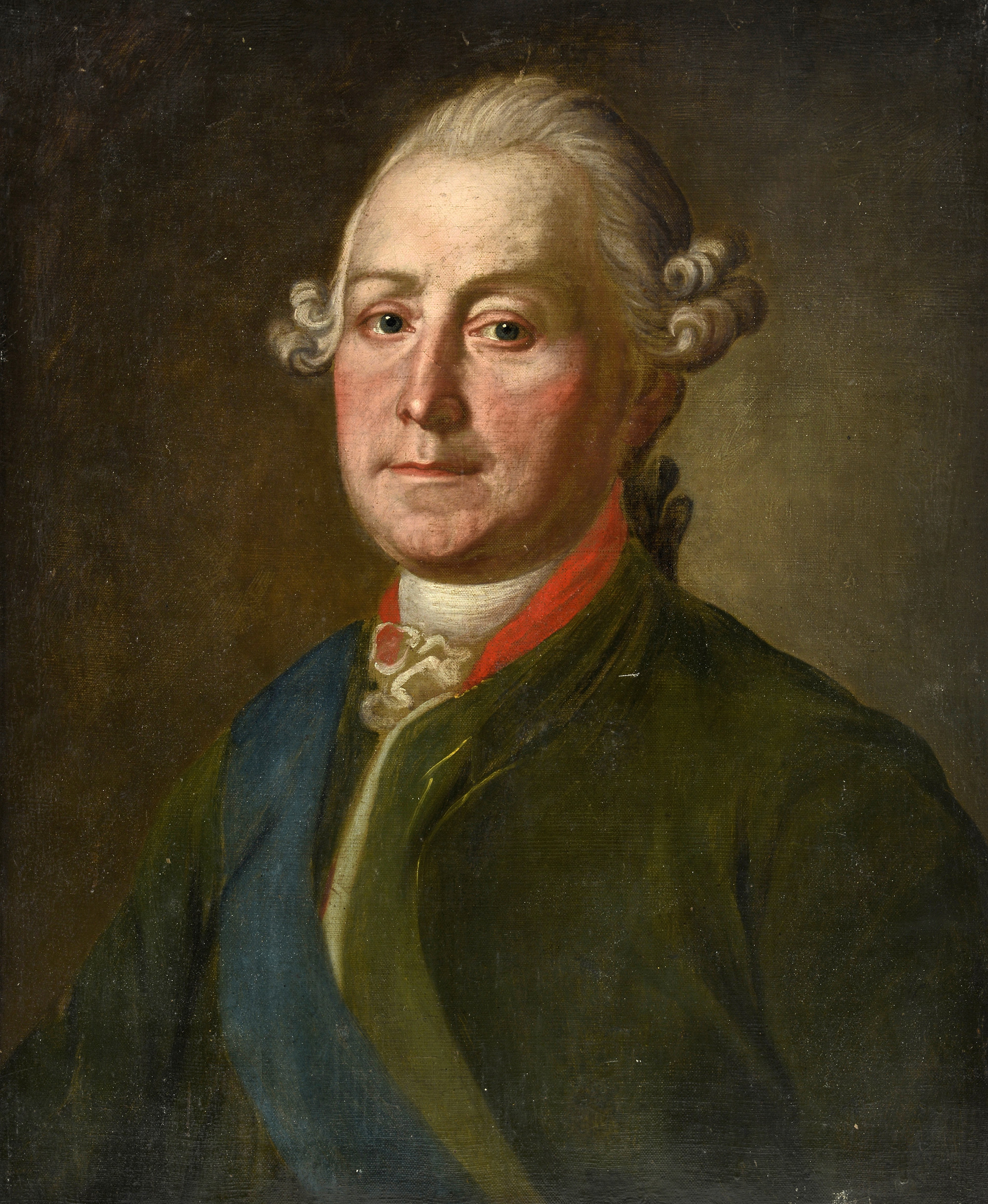
- Born: 9 March 1733; Saint Petersburg, Russian Empire
- Died: 21 December 1799 (aged 66); Saint Petersburg, Russian Empire
- Occupation: Ober–Shtalmeyster
- Spouse: Marina Osipovna Zakrevskaya (1741–1800)
- Children: 2 sons and 5 daughters
- Parents: Aleksandr Lvovich Naryshkin (1694–1745) (father); Elena Aleksandrovna Apraksina (1708–1767) (mother)
- Awards: Order of Saint Alexander Nevsky; Order of Saint Anna; Order of St. Andrew

Lev Aleksandrovich Naryshkin (Russian: Лев Александрович Нарышкин; 9 March 1733 – 21 December 1799) was an Ober–Shtalmeyster from the Naryshkin family, a famous court joker and rake of the times of Peter III and Catherine the Great.

== Biography ==
The youngest son of Aleksandr Naryshkin (cousin of Peter the Great) and state lady Elena Apraksina (granddaughter of Pyotr Apraksin). He began his service in the Preobrazhensky Regiment; in 1751 he was appointed kamer–yunker at the court of Grand Duke Pyotr Fyodorovich. In 1756 he received the rank of kamerger, and a year later he was awarded the Order of Saint Anna, 1st Degree. On 10 February 1761, he was awarded the Order of Saint Alexander Nevsky.

After Peter III ascended the throne on 25 December, Naryshkin became one of his favourites. On 28 December, he was awarded 16,000 rubles from the money of the Kamer–Kontora. On 1 January 1762, he was promoted to shtalmeyster with the rank and salary of an actual general–poruchik; on 10 February, he received a stone house as a gift; on 16 February, as a result of the abolition of the Office of Secret and Investigative Affairs, he was appointed, together with Aleksey Melgunov and Dmitry Volkov, to receive denunciations of intent under the 1st or 2nd point in Saint Petersburg. On 17 May, the combined management of the Main Stable Office and the Court Office was given to Naryshkin's management; in June he received the Order of St. Andrew.

Until the death of Peter III, Naryshkin was with him inseparably, and upon Catherine the Great's accession to the throne he was arrested in Oranienbaum among the emperor's adherents. His arrest, however, did not last long, and Catherine continued to be merciful towards Naryshkin, and on the day of her coronation, 22 September 1762, she granted him the title of Ober–Shtalmeyster. In 1766, he accompanied Grand Duke Pavel Petrovich to Berlin. The following year, Naryshkin was elected as a deputy from the nobles of the Peremyshl and Vorotynsk Districts to the Legislative Commission, and at the same time became a member of the Deanery Commission. While attending meetings of the commission, he did not show much activity in its work, although his name is sometimes found among the persons who signed one or another statement of agreement or disagreement with any provision developed by the commission.

While in the presence of the empress, Naryshkin spent his entire life in the court circle. He accompanied the empress on her travels in 1780–1786 to Belorussiya, Vyshniy Volochyok and Crimea.

Naryshkin was distinguished by his extraordinary hospitality and passion for organizing magnificent and noisy balls, masquerades and picnics. One of the masquerades given by Naryshkin for Catherine in 1772 cost him 300,000 rubles. A description of this masquerade was made in the then Sankt-Peterburgskie Vedomosti. His house was always open to visitors from morning to evening, and the owner did not know many of his guests by name, but he received everyone with the same cordiality.

He died on 21 December 1799, shortly before his death he was granted actual kamerger title. He was buried in the Annunciation Church of the Alexander Nevsky Lavra.

== Place in history ==
Despite the fact that Naryshkin did not hold major positions, he himself was not at all upset about this, since he did not strive for this – but he was always proud of his high birth, being a cousin of Peter the Great.

Naryshkin was unusually popular in Saint Petersburg society and was considered perhaps the brightest star among Catherine's courtiers, bringing gaiety and excitement into their circle and being, in fact, the main jester of the court. His cheerful, good–natured character, sociability and wit earned him the favor of Peter III, who was usually suspicious of his wife's courtiers. Mikhail Shcherbatov in his essay "On the Damage to Morals in Russia", characterizing Peter III, wrote:

This Sovereign had with him his main favorite – Lev Aleksandrovich Naryshkin, a rather smart man, but such a mind that has no desire for any business, is cowardly, greedy for honor and self–interest, comfortable with any luxury, playful, and, in a word, for his appeals and desire to joke, it is more convenient to be a court jester than a nobleman. This was the helper of all his passions.

Catherine, having a very low opinion of Naryshkin's talents and moral qualities and calling him either a "born arlekin", or "weak–headed, spineless" or, finally, "an insignificant person", nevertheless, greatly appreciated his sociable character and ability to entertain society:

He was capable of creating entire discourses on any art or science; at the same time, he used technical terms, spoke for a quarter of an hour or more without a break, and in the end neither he nor anyone else understood anything in everything that flowed from his mouth in a stream instead of connected words, and everyone finally burst into laughter.

Moreover, when in 1783, on the pages of the magazine "Interlocutor of Lovers of the Russian Word", Denis Fonvizin, hiding under the mask of an anonymous person, turned to Catherine with a question hinting at Naryshkin: "Why in former times jesters, tricksters and jokers did not have ranks, but now they have and very large?" – he received a very harsh rebuke from Catherine.

Naryshkin's original personality was reflected in some of the empress's literary works. So, she brought him out in her comedy L'Insouciant and in two humorous essays: Relation authentique d'un voyage outre–mer, que sir Leon grand'ecuyer aurait entrepris par l'avis de ses amis and Leoniana ou faits et dits de sir Leon, grand'ecuyer, recueillis par ses amis. Naryshkin was not a writer, but his interest in literature and its figures is sufficiently attested; in particular, Nikolay Novikov dedicated the 2nd edition of his "Drone" to him.

Derzhavin, who dedicated two poems to Naryshkin, wrote about him:

He was a very sharp and quick–witted man, and if he had not indulged in buffoonery and pranks, he could have been a good minister or general in his mind.

And from the posthumous reviews about Naryshkin the following is typical:

He was a nobleman all the more dangerous because, under the guise of a joke, always sharp and caustic, he was able to easily and opportunely express the most bitter truth.

Gallery

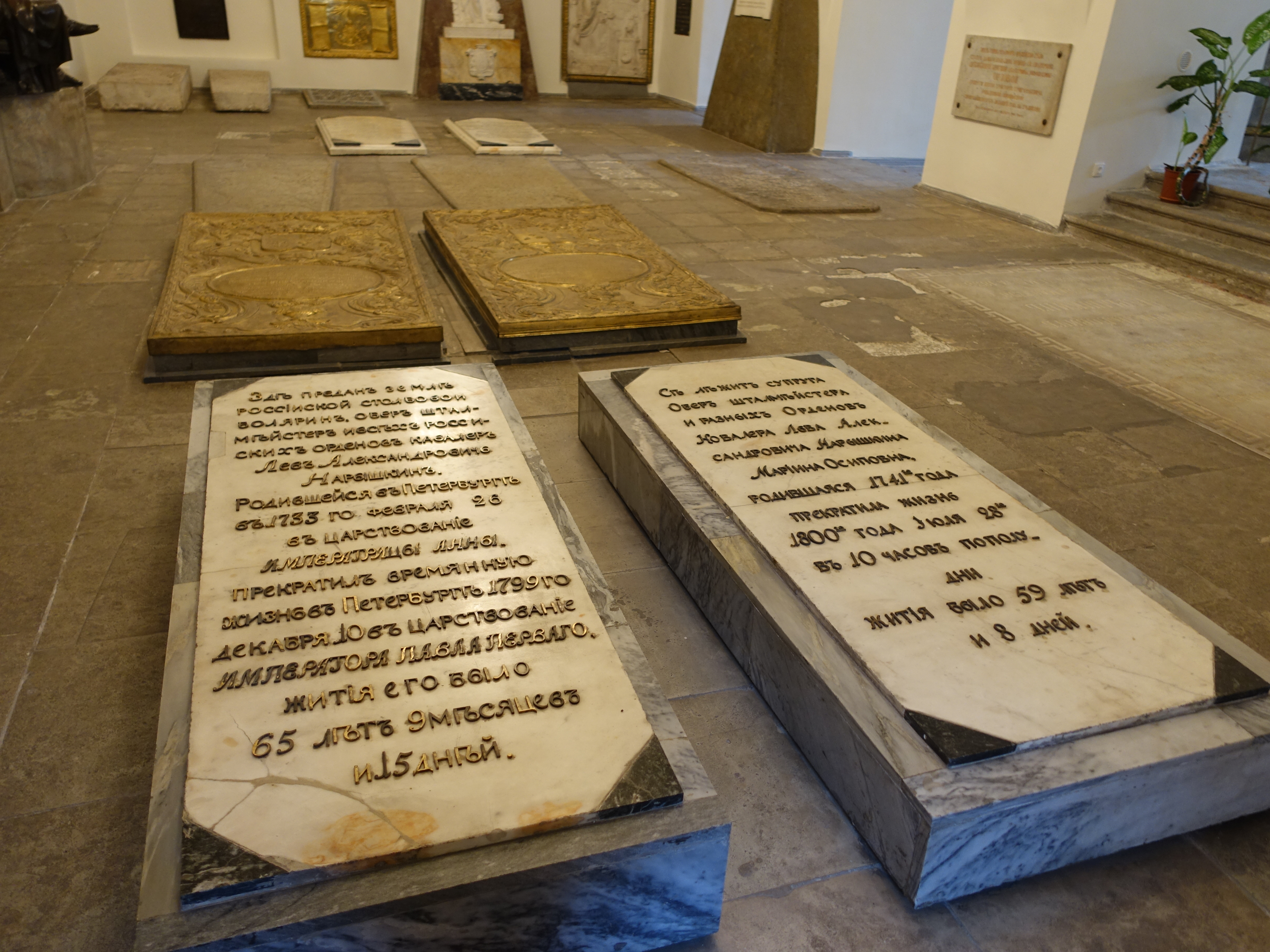
Tombstones of Lev Naryshkin and his wife in the Annunciation Church of the Aleksandr Nevskiy Lavra

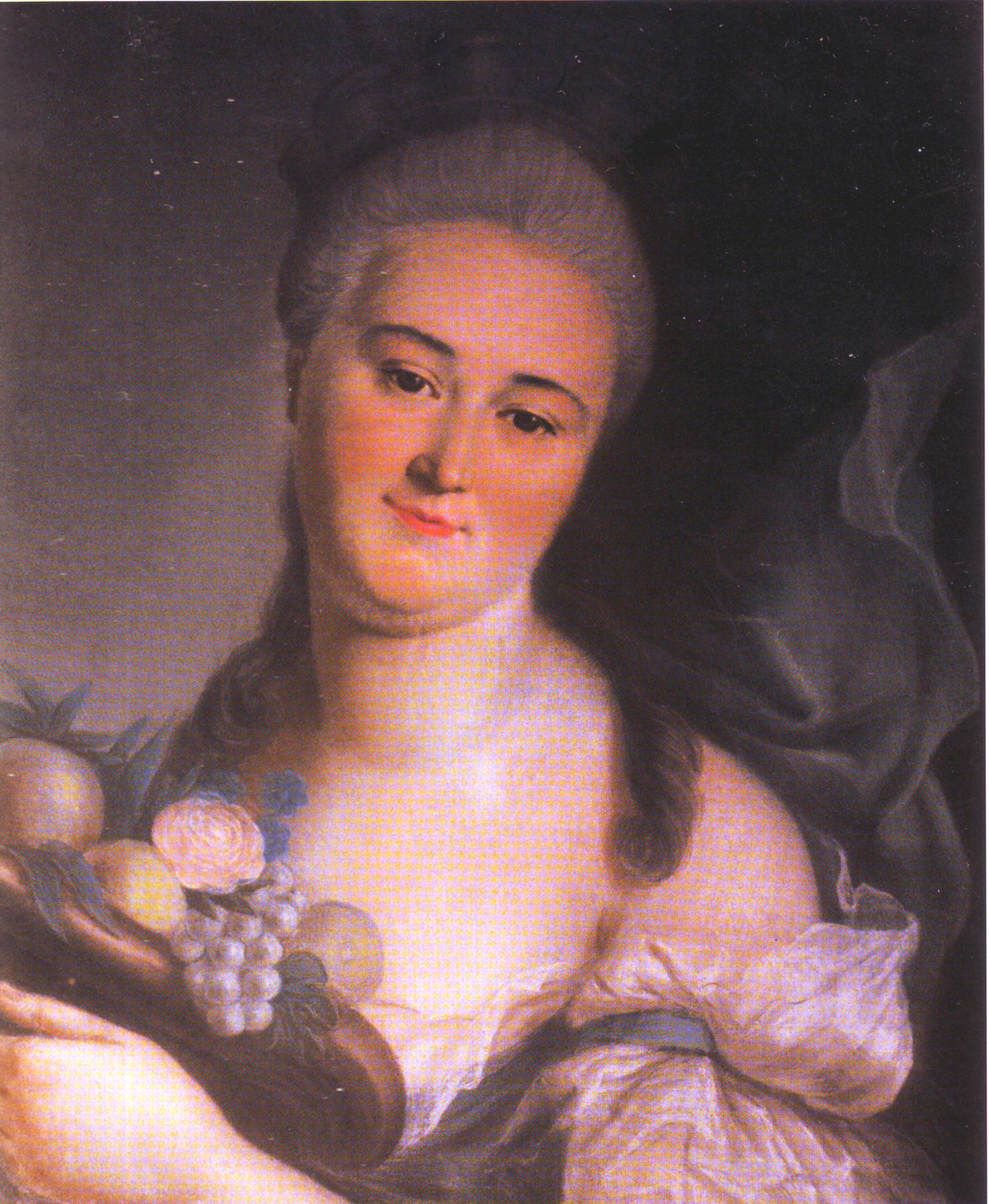
Marina Zakrevskaya, 1756

== Family ==
Naryshkin was married on 22 February 1758, to Marina Zakrevskaya (1741–1800), daughter of the Cossack Hetmanate General of the Baggage Train Osip Zakrevskiy and Anna Razumovskaya. In 1755, Marina Osipovna was taken to court and made a maid of honor; thanks to her beauty and the patronage of Grand Duchess Ekaterina Alekseevna, the future Catherine II, she soon married Lev Naryshkin. This wedding was arranged by the Grand Duchess herself, who wrote in her notes:

Extract from the Memoirs of Ekaterina II

One Thursday towards the end of Shrovetide, when we had a ball, I sat down between Lev Naryshkin's sister–in–law and her sister Senyavina, and we watched Marina Osipovna Zakrevskaya, the empress's maid of honour, and niece of the Counts Razumovskiy, dancing the minuet; she was then agile and light, and it was said that Count Gorn was much in love with her; but as he was always in love with three women at once, he was also courting Countess Mariya Romanovna Vorontsova and Anna Alekseevna Khitrovo, also a maid of honour to Her Imperial Majesty.

We found that the former danced well and was rather nice to herself; she danced with Lev Naryshkin. On this occasion his sister and sister–in–law told me that his mother was talking of marrying Lev Naryshkin to the maiden Khitrovo, the maternal niece of the Shuvalovs... Neither Senyavina nor her sister–in–law cared at all for the Shuvalovs, whom they disliked, as I have said before; as for Lev, he did not know that his mother was thinking of marrying him; he was in love with the Countess Mariya Vorontsova, whom I have just mentioned. When I heard this, I told Senyavina and Naryshkina that this marriage which his mother was arranging with the maiden Khitrovo must not be allowed, and that no one could tolerate her, because she was a schemer, a gossip, and an idle screamer, and that, in order to put an end to such plans, it was necessary to give Lev to marry someone in our spirit, and for this purpose to choose the above–mentioned niece of the Counts Razumovskiy...

These two ladies very much approved of my opinion; the next day, as there was a masquerade at court, I went to Feldmarshal Razumovskiy, who was then Getman of Little Russia, and told him directly that he was doing very badly to miss such a party for his niece as Lev Naryshkin... thus Lev, who was in love with one maiden, and to whom his mother had proposed another, married a third, of whom neither he nor anyone else had thought three days before.

After the wedding, Marina Osipovna devoted herself entirely to family life, the organization and management of her husband's vast estates, without leaving the courtyard. Managing the household economy, Marina Osipovna gave her husband "for pranks and to buy all sorts of nonsense" no more than a ruble a day. On 5 April 1797, she was made a lady of state and received the Order of Saint Catherine, II Degree. In 1799, shortly before her death, Gavriil Derzhavin wrote poems for her birthday. She died on 28 July 1800 in Saint Petersburg and was buried in the Alexander Nevsky Lavra.

In marriage, the Naryshkins had 2 sons and 5 daughters:

- Aleksandr Lvovich (1760–1826), Ober–Gofmarshal, Ober–Kamerger. He was married to a lady–in–waiting and lady of state, Maria Senyavina (1762–1822);
- Natalya Lvovna (1761–1819), maid of honor, married since 1781 to Count Ivan Sollogub (d. 1812); they had a son Lev, grandson Vladimir;
- Ekaterina Lvovna (1762–1820), maid of honor, married to Count Yuriy Golovkin (1762–1846) since 1782;
- Dmitry Lvovich (1764–1838), Ober–Egermeyster. He was married to the famous beauty and favorite Princess Mariya Svyatopolk–Chetvertinskaya (1779–1854);
- Anna Lvovna (1766–1826), maid of honor of the court, was married to the Polish Prince Poninskiy;
- Maria Lvovna (1767 – after 1812), sang beautifully and played the harp; in 1789 Grigoriy Potyomkin fell in love with her; later she became the third wife of Prince Feliks Lyubomirskiy (1747–1819);
- Elizaveta Lvovna (1770–1795), died in childhood.
Gallery

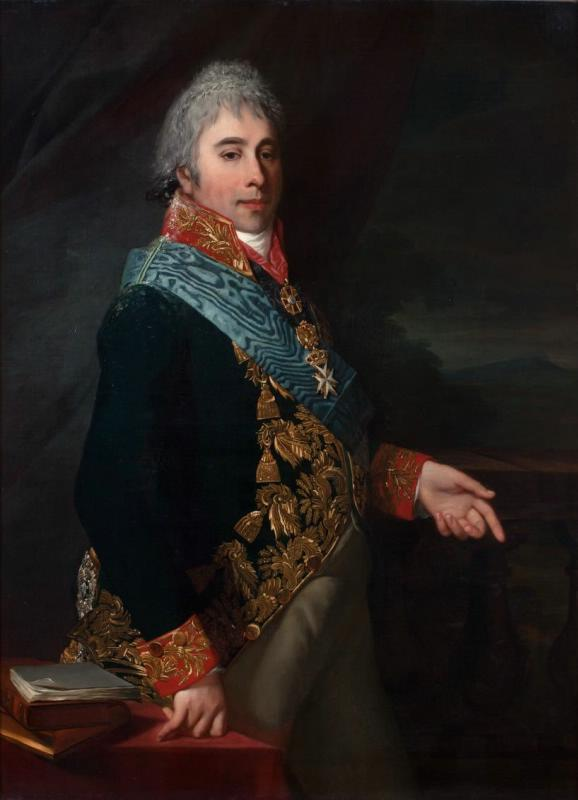
Aleksandr Lvovich, son

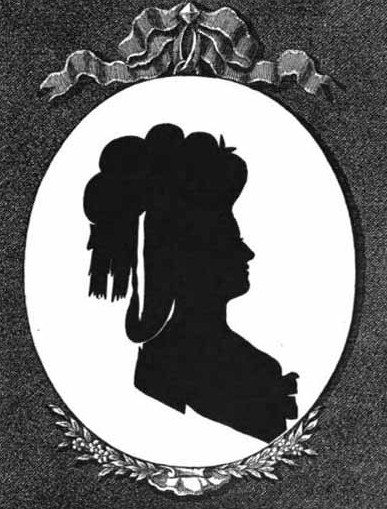
Natalya Lvovna, daughter

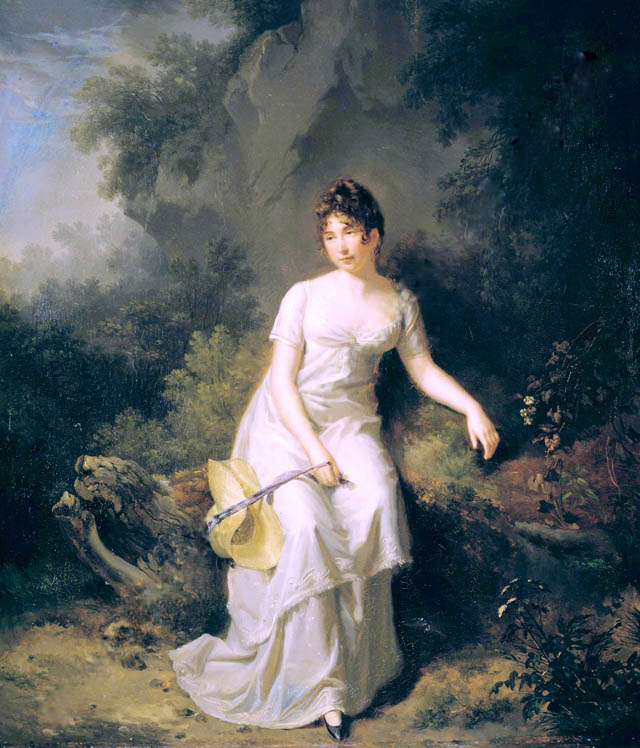
Ekaterina Lvovna, daughter

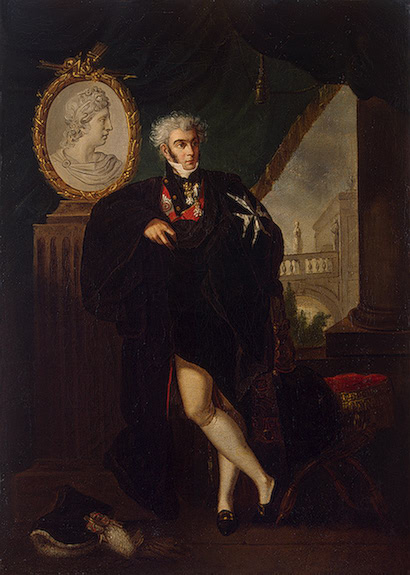
Dmitriy Lvovich, son

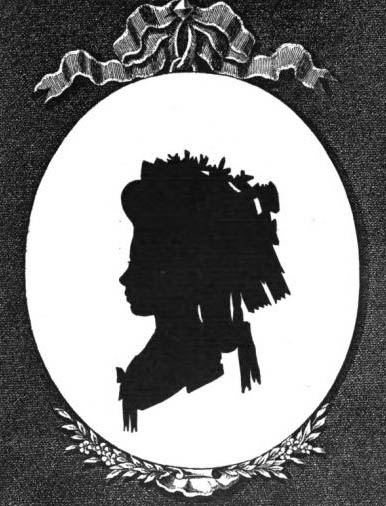
Anna Lvovna, daughter

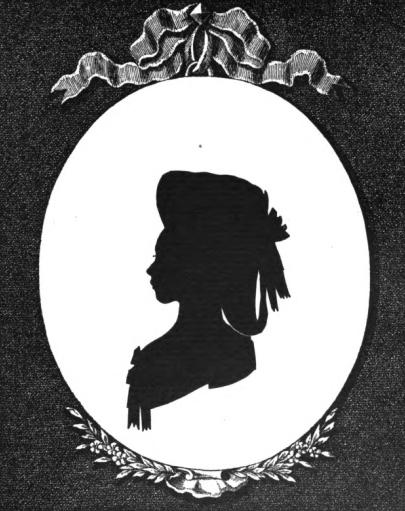
Elizaveta Lvovna, daughter

== Sources ==
- Naryshkin, Lev Aleksandrovich (Ober–Shtalmeyster) // Russian Biographical Dictionary: in 25 Volumes – Sankt–Peterburg – Moskva, 1896–1918
