= Anisya Kirillovna Tolstaya =

Russian noblewoman and lady-in-waiting

Anisya Kirillovna Tolstaya (died 1732), was a Russian noblewoman, lady-in-waiting and alleged royal mistress to Tsar Peter the Great.

== Life ==
Anisya Kirillovna Tolstaya was possibly related to empress Natalya Naryshkina. There are theories that she was Peter's maternal aunt; however this has not been confirmed due to lack of documentation. Tolstaya has often been referred to as the mistress of Peter. However, this is not confirmed. She did have some influence in the private circle and household of Peter, but this may not have been because she was his mistress, as have been assumed.

She served as maid-of-honour to Natalya Alexeyevna of Russia. In 1703, when Peter brought the future Catherine I to Moscow as his mistress, Tolstaya was made her companion and servant on the orders of Peter. During the early years, she was described as in effect a guardian of Catherine, who called her "Aunt". Tolstaya read the letter of Peter to the illiterate Catherine, and wrote her replies to him, and was also described as a charming person who tried to cheer Catherine up when needed. She accompanied Catherine when the latter was moved to Saint Petersburg in 1706.

In 1713, after the marriage of Tsar Peter to the future Catherine I of Russia, she was formally appointed to the now formally appointed household of the now empress Catherine. In 1717, Tolstaya belonged to the entourage accompanying Peter and Catherine to Europe.

Tolstaya appear to have had some influence over Peter the Great. Alexei Petrovich, Tsarevich of Russia appealed not just to Catherine but also to Anisya, as his mother's relative, to ask his father for mercy during his conflict and arrest.

== In culture ==
Anisya Kirillovna Tolstaya is a character in A. Tolstoy's "Peter the Great".
