= Lazarevskoe Cemetery =

Cemetery in St. Petersburg, Russia

Coordinates: 59°55′23″N 30°23′14″E

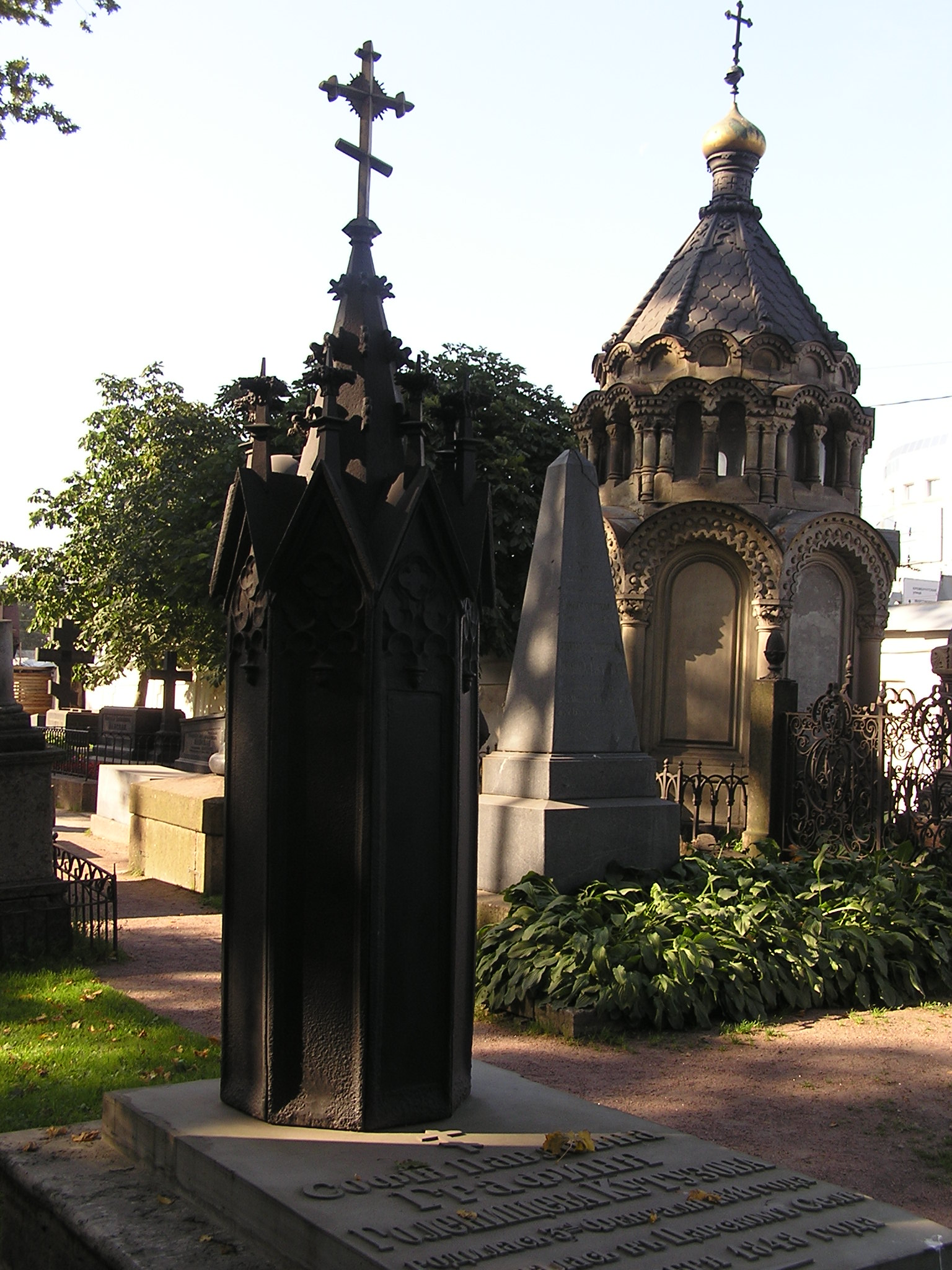
Monuments in the Lazarevskoe Cemetery

Lazarevskoe Cemetery (Russian: Лазаревское кладбище) is a historic cemetery in the centre of Saint Petersburg, and the oldest surviving cemetery in the city. It is part of the Alexander Nevsky Lavra, and is one of four cemeteries in the complex. Since 1932 it has been part of the State Museum of Urban Sculpture, which refers to it as the Necropolis of the Eighteenth Century (Russian: Некрополь XVIII века). It covers 0.7 hectares.

The cemetery came into existence with the establishment of the city of Saint Petersburg by Peter the Great in the early eighteenth century. With the death of Peter's sister, Natalya Alexeyevna, in 1716, Peter instructed that she be buried in the grounds of the Alexander Nevsky Monastery, which was under development at that time. In 1717 Natalya Alexeyevna was interred in the Church of St Lazarus, the first stone building in the monastery complex, and from which the cemetery took its name. The location soon became the burial site for other members of Peter's family and court, and became the most prestigious burial ground in the city, requiring Peter's personal permission to be interred there. The remains of Natalya Alexeyevna and other members of the imperial family were reinterred in the monastery's Annunciation Church soon after their original burial, but the church and cemetery complex remained popular sites for the St Petersburg elites, and many noble families established their family plots here.

By the early nineteenth century the cemetery was becoming full, and new cemeteries were opened in the monastery complex. The last burials in the Lazarevskoe Cemetery took place in the early twentieth century, and the cemetery was closed to new burials in 1919. During the Soviet period, the cemetery became a place of interest for its elaborate funerary monuments and the graves of historically important figures. In 1932 it was declared the "Necropolis of the eighteenth century" and became part of the State Museum of Urban Sculpture. Graves deemed less significant were cleared away, while monuments and remains considered more artistically or historically important were moved into the cemetery from churches and burial grounds that were in the process of being demolished. Today the cemetery operates as a museum, displaying the funerary sculpture of a wide range of important artists of the eighteenth and nineteenth centuries.

== History ==
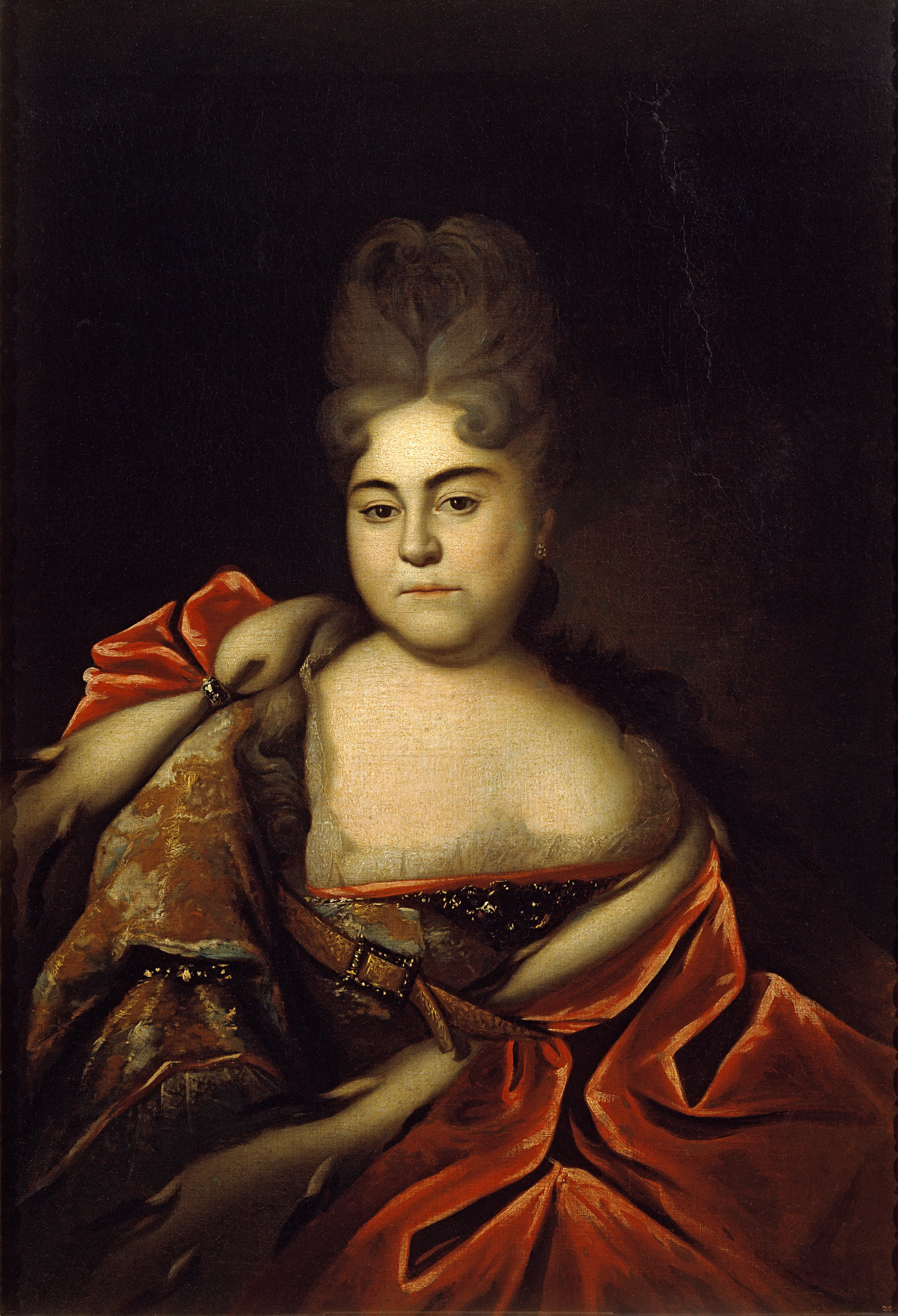
Natalya Alexeyevna, sister of Peter the Great. Her burial in 1717 marked the beginning of the cemetery complex.

Burials began in 1717 when Natalya Alexeyevna, the sister of Peter the Great, was interred in the burial vault of the Church of St Lazarus, from which the cemetery took its name. During the early years of its existence it required the Emperor's permission to allow burials in the cemetery, making it the chosen location for the burial plots of St Petersburg's elite. By the end of the eighteenth century burial was extended to the wealthy merchant class, in exchange for the payment of large sums of money. The wealthy and powerful commissioned tombstones and monuments from the most prominent Russian sculptors. The cemetery includes funerary monuments by Ivan Martos, Mikhail Kozlovsky, Vasily Demut-Malinovsky, Andrey Voronikhin, Fedot Shubin, Fyodor Tolstoy and other masters.

By the nineteenth century the cemetery was becoming overcrowded, and the first of the new cemeteries in the Lavra, the Tikhvin Cemetery, was opened in 1823. Burials in the Lazarevskoe Cemetery became less frequent in the nineteenth century, and in the twentieth century occurred in only exceptional cases. One of the last people to be interred was Count Sergei Witte in 1915, and in 1919 the cemetery was closed to new burials.

During the Soviet period the cemetery was closed and placed under state protection, administered by the society "Old Petersburg" (Russian: «Старый Петербург»). The People's Commissariat for Education proposed in the early 1920s that the cemetery become a museum displaying the sculpture of funerary monuments, a proposal that the Leningrad city administration, Lensovet agreed to. Work began on studying and recording the details of the memorials, and in 1932 it was declared a museum and part of the State Museum of Urban Sculpture, but remained generally closed to visitors. The head of its administration from 1932 was the historian N. V. Uspensky. A group of Soviet writers visited the cemetery in 1934, and with the support of Maxim Gorky, declared it of great cultural and historical significance.

From 1935 Lensovet proposed that the Museum of Urban Sculpture collect the most significant pieces of memorial sculpture into the cemetery. During the 1930s the Soviet authorities "sought to establish a formal pantheon of dead Russian cultural heroes modelled after the national pantheon in Paris." The Lazarevskoe and Tikhvin Cemeteries, as well as the Volkovo Cemetery, were designated as the sites for development. Those memorials thought to have low historical or artistic interest were cleared away, while those considered to have higher historical or artistic interest were brought from other cemeteries across the city, quite often without the remains that they commemorated. One such example is Agustín de Betancourt, originally interred in the Smolensky Lutheran Cemetery with a columnar monument designed by Auguste de Montferrand. Betancourt's remains and monument were transferred to the Lazarevskoe Cemetery in 1979, where the monument has undergone restoration. The remains and funerary monuments of architect Jean-François Thomas de Thomon and mathematician Leonhard Euler had been transferred from the Smolensky Lutheran Cemetery in 1940 and 1956 respectively. During the Second World War the museum carried out inspections of the city's monuments and carried out some repair and restoration work. Large scale restoration work was carried out after the ending of the Siege of Leningrad, with the museum opening to the public in 1952.

== Cemetery church ==
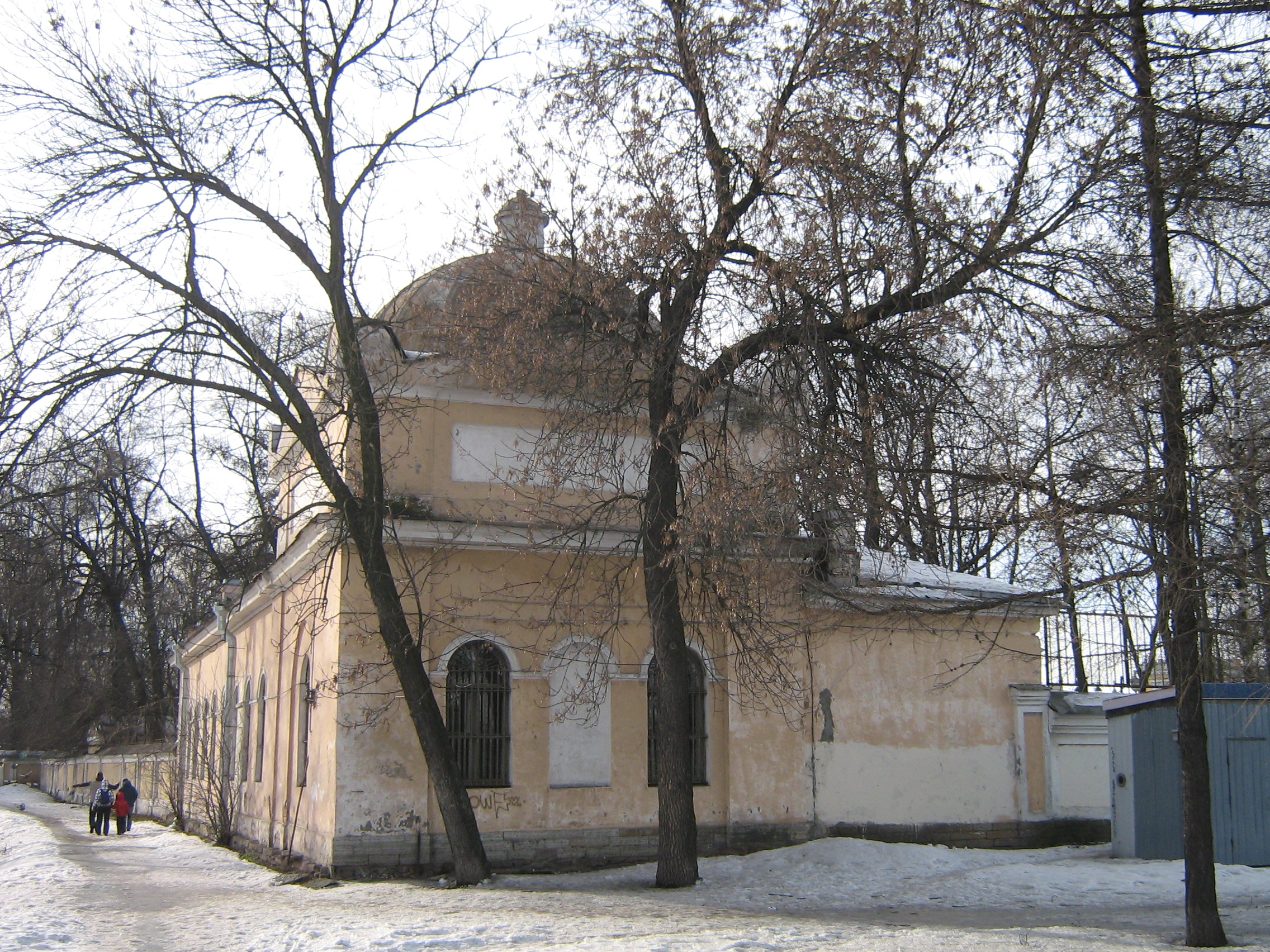
View of the Church of St Lazarus in 2012

The Church of St Lazarus (Russian: Церковь Праведного Лазаря) was built in 1717, and is located along the banks of the Monastyrka River. Peter the Great's sister, Natalya Alexeyevna, had died in 1716, but Peter delayed her burial until his return from a journey abroad. The stone octahedral church, the first stone building of the Monastery, was built behind the Lavra's Annunciation Church, and was probably consecrated on 17 October 1717, shortly after Peter's return, and at the time of the transfer of the relics of St Lazarus. On 23 December 1718 court physician Robert Erskine was interred in the crypt, and on 26 April Peter's infant son, Tsarevich Peter Petrovich, was buried there. In 1723, the remains of Peter the Great's relatives were transferred to stone tombs in the Annunciation Church.

In 1719 Peter's close associate Count Boris Sheremetev was buried in the cemetery, beginning a long association with the Sheremetev family. Other military compatriots of Peter were also interred here, including Adam Veyde and Avtonom Golovin. By the middle of the eighteenth century the Lazarevskoe Cemetery contained about 5,000 burials. The church was rebuilt and expanded between 1787 and 1789, with the addition of a small sacristy at the northern end, and refectory on the western end. Most of the funding was provided by Ivan Yelagin, a prominent figure of Catherine the Great's reign, with further funding of 1,600 rubles from Count Nikolai Sheremetev to include the grave of Borish Sheremetev and to bring the church to its present dimensions. Sheremetev, who had scandalised society by marrying Praskovia Zhemchugova, an actress and opera singer of serf origins, arranged for a lavish funeral on her death in 1803, and for requiem services in the following years. On his own death in 1809 he was interred next to her in the church.

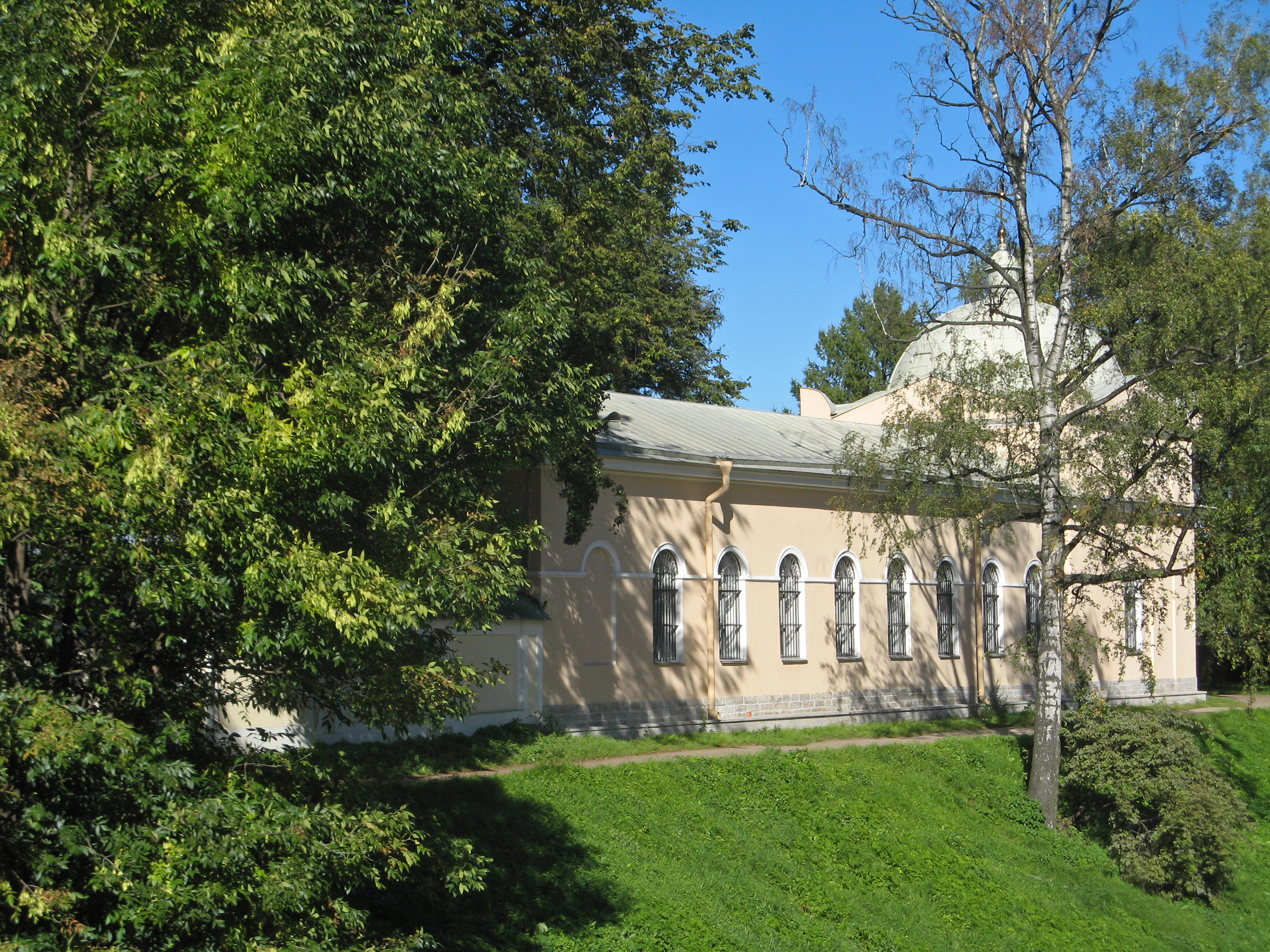
The cemetery church in 2016

Numerous other members of the Sheremetev family were interred in the vaults over the years, as were those of other important Russian noble houses. Between 1835 and 1836 the church was completely rebuilt by architect L. Ya. Tiblen at the commission of Count D. N. Sheremetev. The roof and floors were replaced, the foundations redone and the walls rebuilt to an increased height. By the completion of the work in May 1836 the church had been fundamentally redesigned, only retaining the floorplan of the original. Further repair works in 1845 and 1867 altered the iconostasis and renewed the paintings. Burials continued to take place in the church vaults, with the last being Ekaterina Vasilyevna Dashkova, the widow of the writer and statesman of the Arzamas Society Dmitry Dashkov, in 1890.

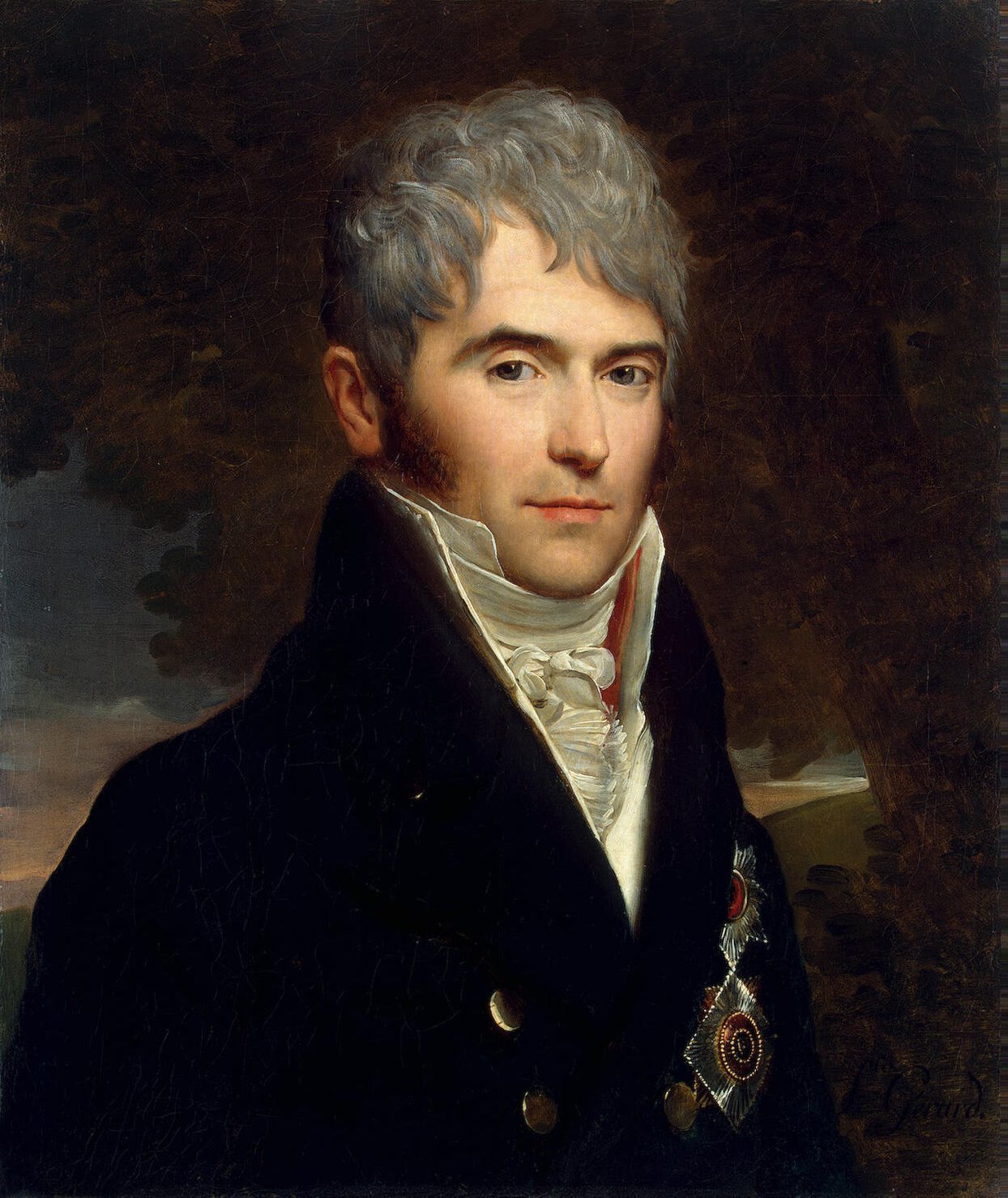
Viktor Kochubey, one of a number of public figures whose remains and monuments were reinterred in the church during the Soviet period

The church was closed with the rest of the cemetery in 1923, and for a time served as a warehouse for storing monuments and gravestones brought from other cemeteries that were being demolished. With the establishment of the necropolis museum in 1932, the church interior was heavily remodelled. The iconostasis was dismantled and the walls and ceiling were painted over. Most of the icons were removed, though many of the historical monuments were retained. With the demolition of the Lavra's Dukhovskaya Church in 1937, a number of monuments were transferred to the museum, and over the next few years the remains of several famous historical figures were transferred and interred in the Church of St Lazarus, including; Prince Ioane of Georgia, Viktor Kochubey and Ekaterina Ilyinichna Kutuzova, the wife of Mikhail Kutuzov. Other monuments were brought from the Feodorovskaya Lavra Church, the Smolensky Armenian Church and the Catholic Church in Tsarskoye Selo. The remains of Count Ivan Laval, the father-in-law of Decembrist Prince Sergei Petrovich Trubetskoy were reburied in the church, but his monument was never installed.

The church was damaged several times during the siege of Leningrad, with repair work beginning in 1944. It reopened several years later, and serves as an exhibition hall for funerary monuments of the eighteenth and nineteenth centuries. Eighty-two monuments are now located in the Church of St Lazarus, thirty-three of which have been brought from other locations.

== Burials ==
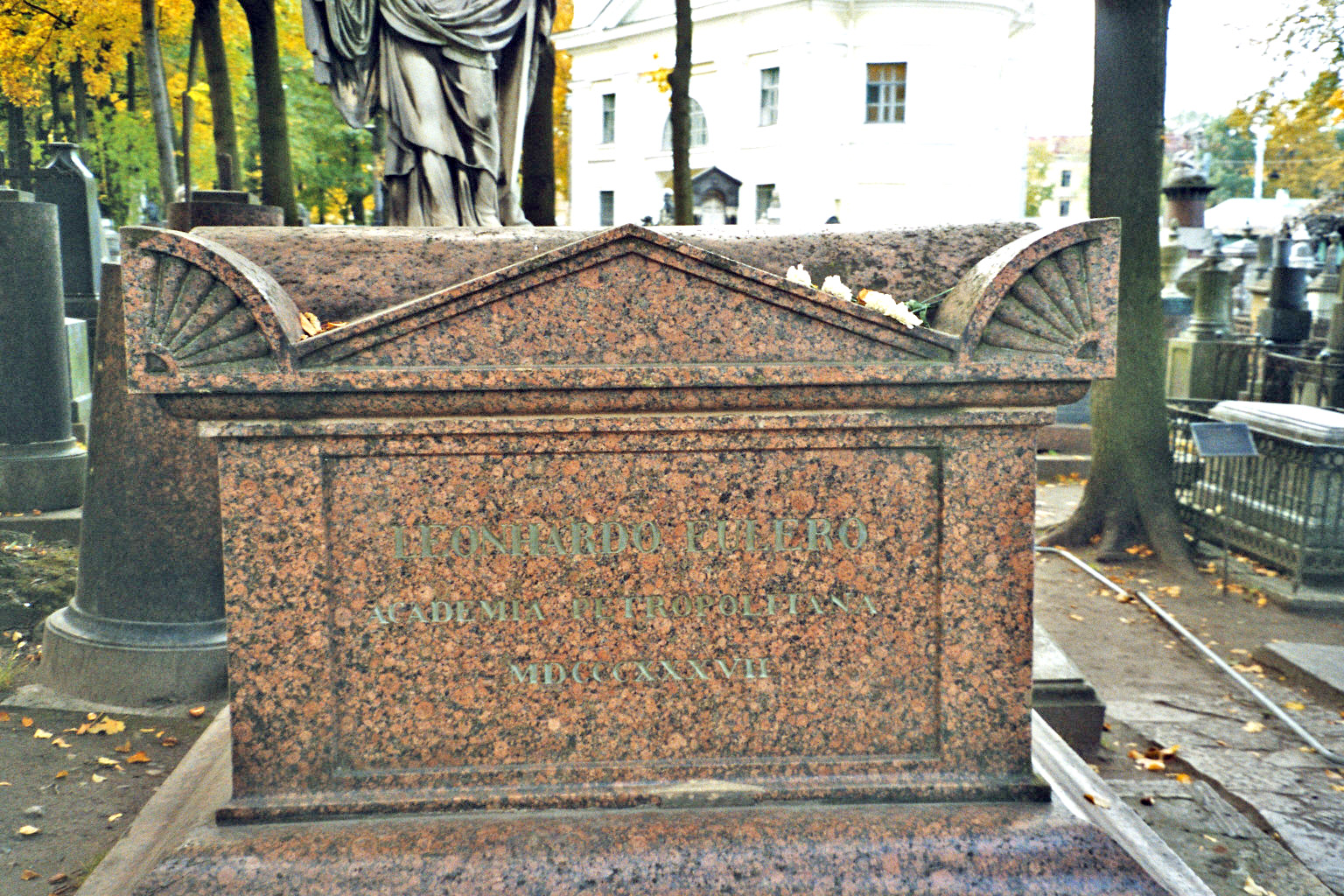
The grave of Leonhard Euler, transferred from its original location in the Smolensky Lutheran Cemetery in 1956

Many of the early burials were those of the associates of Peter the Great. These included military figures such as Field Marshal Boris Sheremetev and General Adam Veyde, and the Court Physician Robert Erskine. The cemetery's exclusivity made it a desirable burial site, and many of the leading figures and families of St Petersburg acquired plots. Among them were the academics Mikhail Lomonosov and Stepan Krasheninnikov; playwrights Denis Fonvizin and Yakov Knyazhnin; architects Ivan Starov, and Andrey Voronikhin; statesmen and politicians Alexander Stroganov, Nikolay Mordvinov, Mikhail Muravyov-Vilensky and Sergei Witte; and military officers such as Vasily Chichagov. The family vaults of the Beloselsky-Belozersky, Trubetskoy, Volkonsky and Naryshkin ancient noble houses were located here, as were those of some of the prominent merchant dynasties such as the Demidovs and Yakovlevs. Art historian Nikolai Vrangel wrote "It was as if all those who had once formed a close circle of court society gathered here after death. A whole epoch, a whole world of obsolete ideas, almost all the court society of Elizabeth, Catherine and Paul were buried in the small space of the Lazarevskoe cemetery".

The remains and monuments of Jean-François Thomas de Thomon, mathematician Leonhard Euler and engineer Agustín de Betancourt, all originally interred in the Smolensky Lutheran Cemetery, were transferred to the Lazarevskoe Cemetery in 1940, 1956 and 1979 respectively.
