= Aleksey Okhotnikov =

Lover of Elizabeth Alexievna (1780–1807)

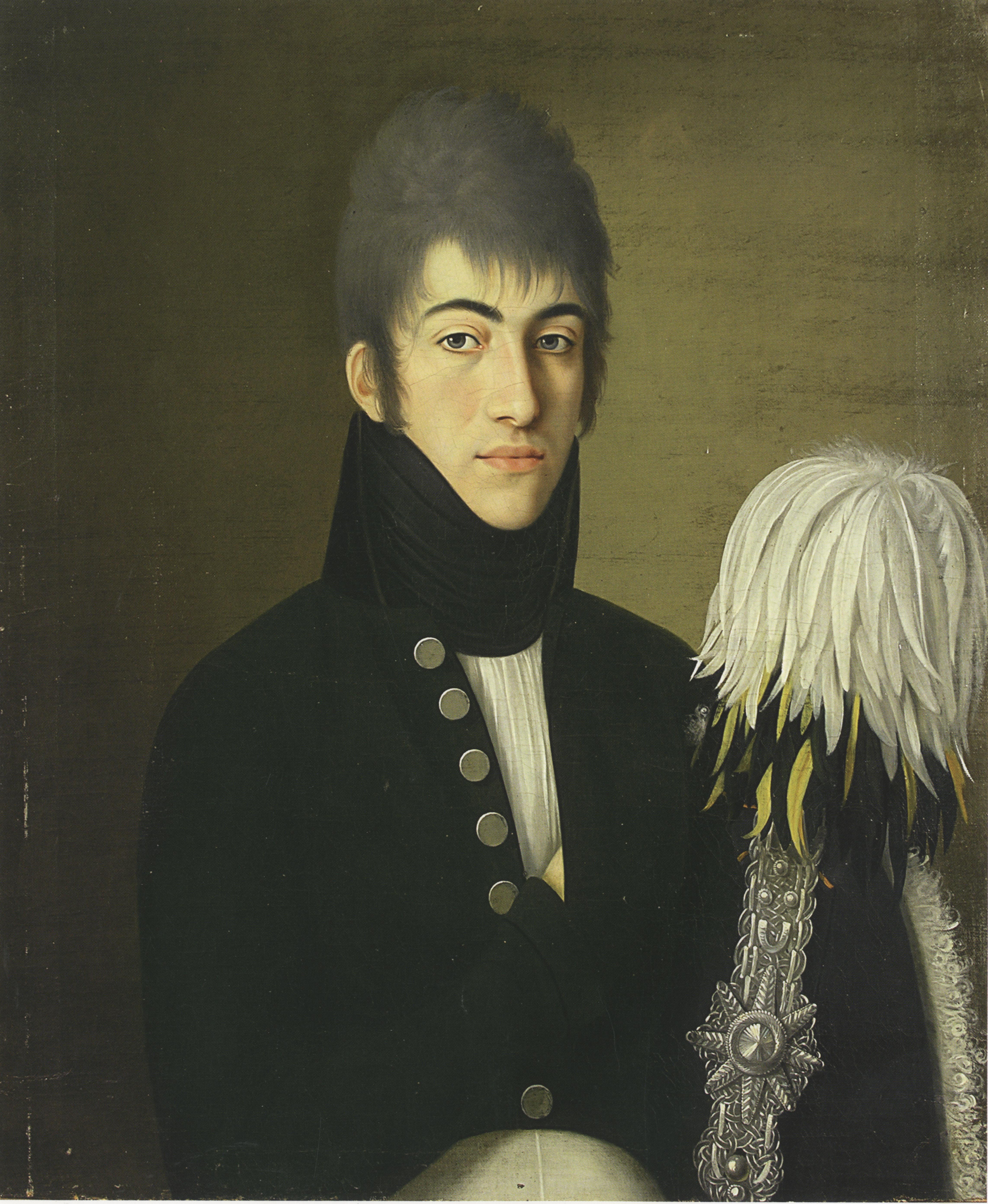
Alexey Yakovlevich Okhotnikov

Aleksey Yakovlevich Okhotnikov (Russian: Алексей Яковлевич Охотников; 1780 – January 30, 1807), also Alexis Okhotnikov in foreign sources, was a Russian Chevalier Guard officer best known for being a secret lover of Russian Empress Elizabeth Alexeievna and a rumored father of her short-lived daughter, Grand Duchess Elizabeth Alexandrovna. The brief, thought to be a sole one, affair of the Empress was kept in close secret and was only uncovered to a wider public from the diaries of the Empress after her death.

== In popular culture ==
He had an episodic appearance in the 2005 Russian TV series Adjutants of Love, portrayed by Andrey Kuzichev.
