= Peter Petrovich, Tsarevich of Russia =

Peter Petrovich
- Tsarevich of Russia
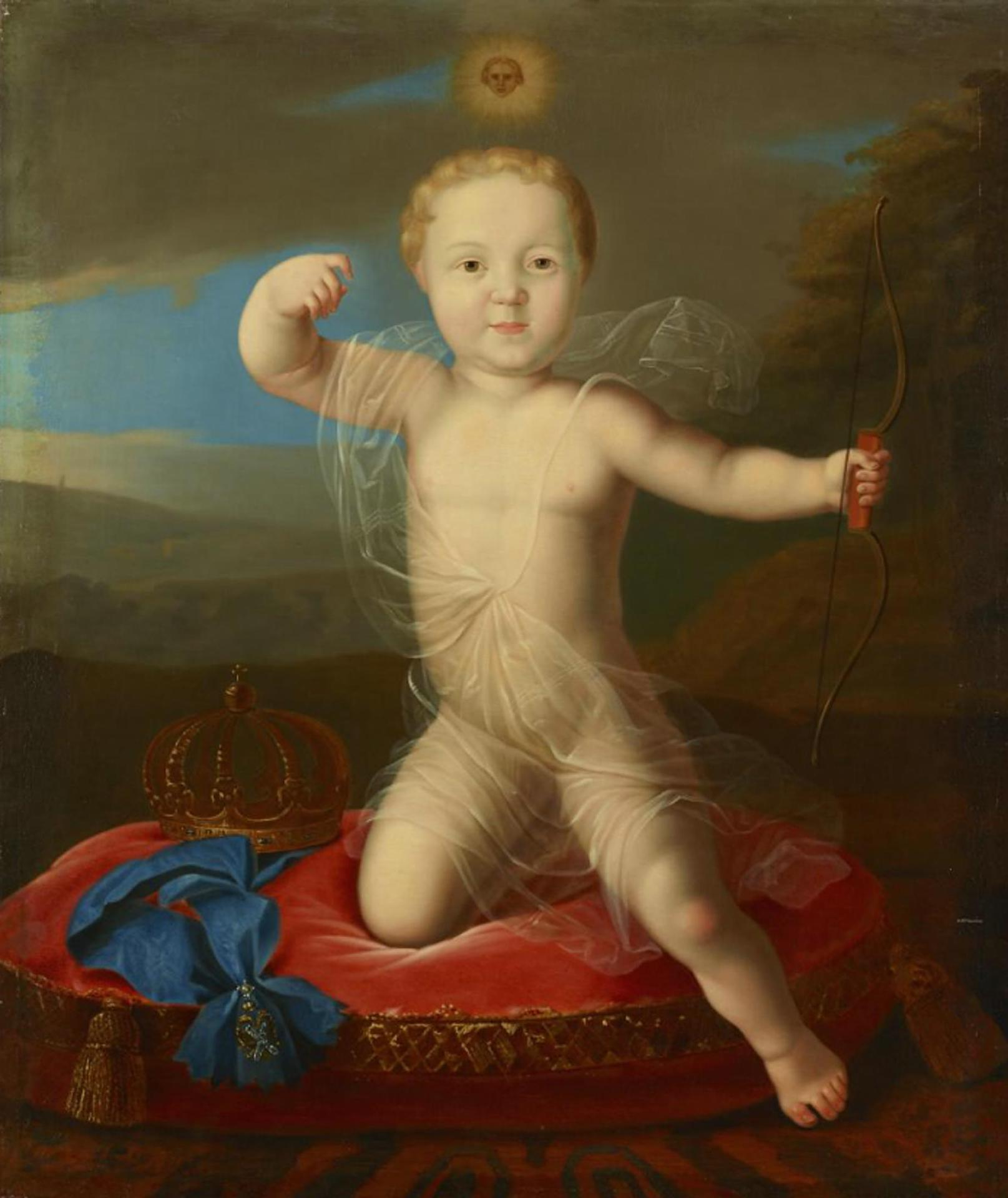
- Peter Petrovich as Cupid
- Born: 15 November 1715; St. Petersburg, Tsardom of Russia
- Died: 19 April 1719 (aged 3); St. Petersburg, Tsardom of Russia
- Burial: Annunciation Church of the Alexander Nevsky Lavra
- House: Romanov
- Father: Peter I of Russia
- Mother: Catherine Alekseyevna (later Catherine I of Russia)

Peter Petrovich (15 November 1715 – 19 April 1719) was a Russian Tsarevich and son of Emperor Peter I and Empress Catherine. Tsarevich Peter became heir to the Russian throne in February 1718 after the Emperor removed his eldest son, Alexis Petrovich, from the succession. The Tsarevich died in 1719 aged 3 before inheriting the throne. His parents were Tsar Peter I and the future Catherine I. In 1732, a pretender emerged claiming to be the dead Tsarevich.

== Early life ==
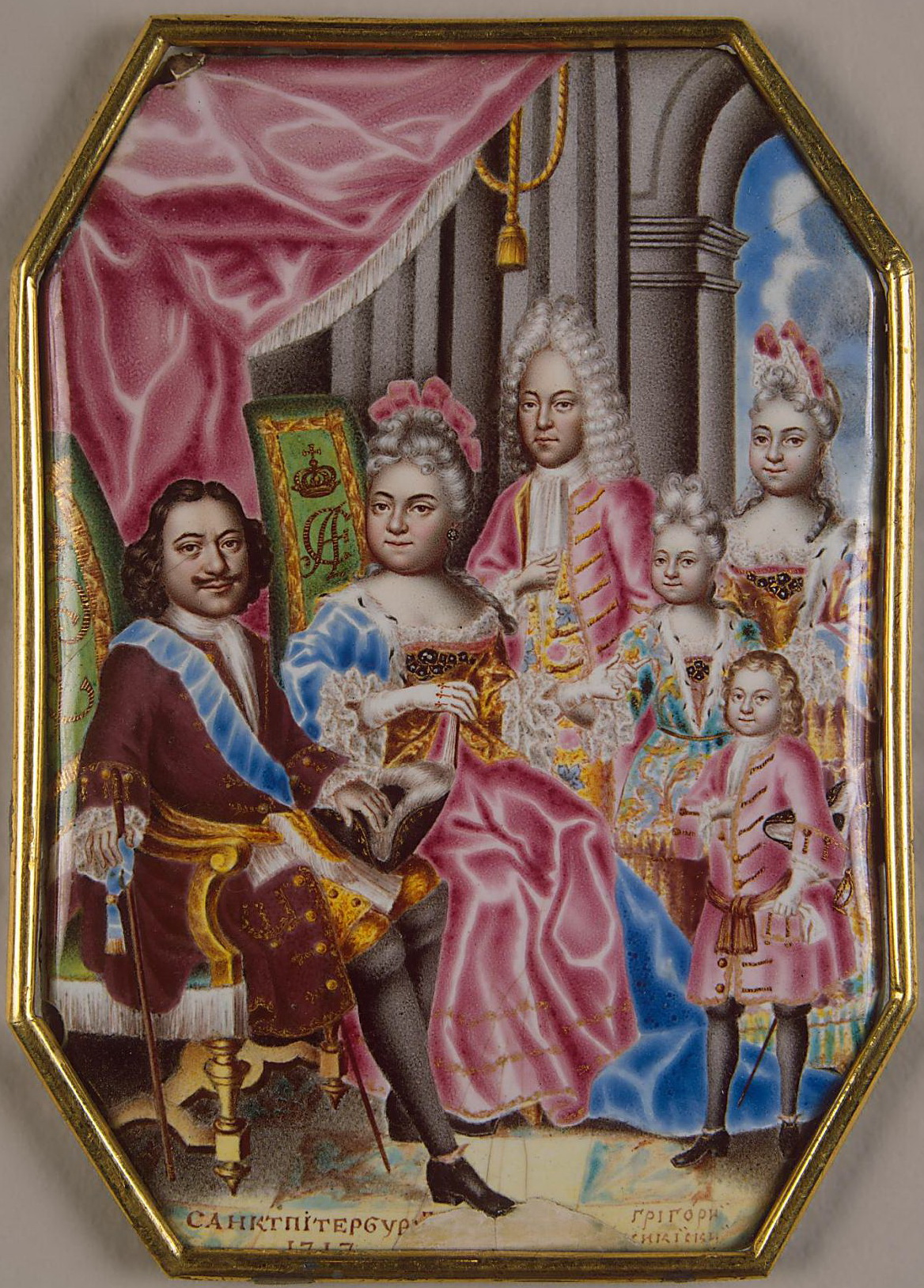
Peter Petrovich with his family, his parents Peter I and Catherine I, his half brother Alexis Petrovich, his sisters Anna Petrovna and Elizabeth Petrovna

Peter Petrovich was born on 15 November 1715 in Saint Petersburg as the son of Tsar Peter I and Tsaritsa and future Empress Catherine I. Just over three weeks before his birth, Tsarevich Alexis Petrovich, Peter’s older half brother had a son, also to be named Peter as Peter Alexeyevich, who would later become Peter II. On the birth of Peter Petrovich, Peter the Great stated "God has sent me a new recruit". Peter Petrovich was baptized, his Godfathers being Frederick IV of Denmark and Frederick William I of Prussia.

== Tsarevich ==
In 1715, Tsarevich Alexis tried to flee Russia, but was brought back in 1718 and investigated. He was tortured and forced to renounce his rights to the Russian throne and recognize Peter Petrovich as the new Tsarevich and heir apparent whereupon he died shortly afterwards. As a result of Alexis treason and death, nobles and soldiers were required to swear an oath of allegiance to Peter Petrovich.

== Death ==
Peter Petrovich died on 19 April 1719 in Saint Petersburg and was firstly buried in the Church of the Resurrection of Lazarus of the Alexander Nevsky Monastery. In 1723, he was reburied in the Annunciation Church, leading to rumors that Tsar Peter had another son named Peter Petrovich born in 1719, but this was later proven false. Peter Petrovich’s death led to succession becoming uncertain due to Peter Alexeyevich becoming the only remaining agnatic Romanov after the tsar. In 1722, Peter I issued a law allowing him to choose his successor, but he never used it.

== Pretender ==
In 1730, Peter Alexeyevich, who was by then Peter II, died. He was the last of the agnatic House of Romanov. Two years after Peter II died, an imposter claiming to be Peter Petrovich appeared and was quickly found and executed.
