= Annunciation Church of the Alexander Nevsky Lavra =

Church in Saint Petersburg, Russia

Coordinates: 59°55′20″N 30°23′17″E

The Church of the Blessing of the Most Holy Virgin and the Holy Blessed Prince Alexander Nevsky Це́рковь Благове́щения Пресвято́й Богоро́дицы и свято́го благове́рного кня́зя Алекса́ндра Не́вского
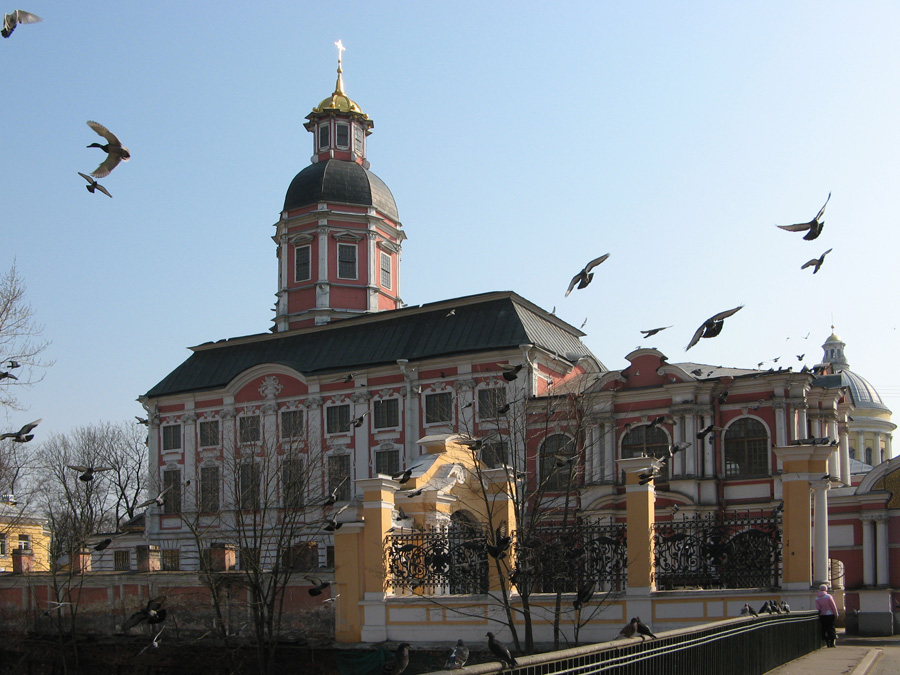

Religion
- Affiliation: Russian Orthodox

Location
- Location: Monastyrki Embankment 1, Saint Petersburg
- Interactive map of The Church of the Blessing of the Most Holy Virgin and the Holy Blessed Prince Alexander Nevsky; Це́рковь Благове́щения Пресвято́й Богоро́дицы и свято́го благове́рного кня́зя Алекса́ндра Не́вского

Architecture
- Architect: Domenico Trezzini
- Style: Petrine Baroque
- Groundbreaking: 1717
- Completed: 1725

Website
- www.gmgs.ru/expoz/blags

The Annunciation Church of the Alexander Nevsky Lavra (Russian: Благовещенская церковь Александро-Невской лавры), or in full, the Church of the Blessing of the Most Holy Virgin and the Holy Blessed Prince Alexander Nevsky (Russian: Це́рковь Благове́щения Пресвято́й Богоро́дицы и свято́го благове́рного кня́зя Алекса́ндра Не́вского) is a Russian Orthodox church in Saint Petersburg. It is in the Diocese of Saint Petersburg and is part of the Alexander Nevsky Lavra.

The church was one of the earliest buildings in the monastery complex, begun in 1719 and completed by 1725. The building contained two churches, the upper floor was dedicated to Saint Alexander Nevsky and was built to hold his relics, installed when the church was consecrated in 1724. The church on the ground floor, originally planned to be the monastery refectory, was dedicated to the annunciation of the Virgin Mary and was consecrated in 1725. Both were richly decorated by prominent Russian artisans and received important donations of decorations and fixtures from the imperial family. From its early years it became an important burial ground for members of the imperial family, their associates, and the Russian nobility. The wealthy paid for elaborate monuments, and the several noble families established burial vaults in the church.

The church was closed during the Soviet period, being divided up into office space, and used as a warehouse and storage area for other funerary monuments that were being removed from churches and cemeteries that were in the process of closure or demolition. The State Museum of Urban Sculpture took over the building and used it as a display space for historically and artistically important examples of funerary monuments and sculpture. In addition to those monuments already in the church, other monuments, or parts of them, were gathered from different locations to add to the museum's collections. It opened to the public in 1950, and survived the fall of the Soviet Union. The Orthodox Church has requested the return of the church, and in 2013 the vice-governor of Saint Petersburg announced it would be handed back to the monastery authorities. The issue has been complicated however over the issue of the future ownership and display of the monuments.

== Design and construction ==
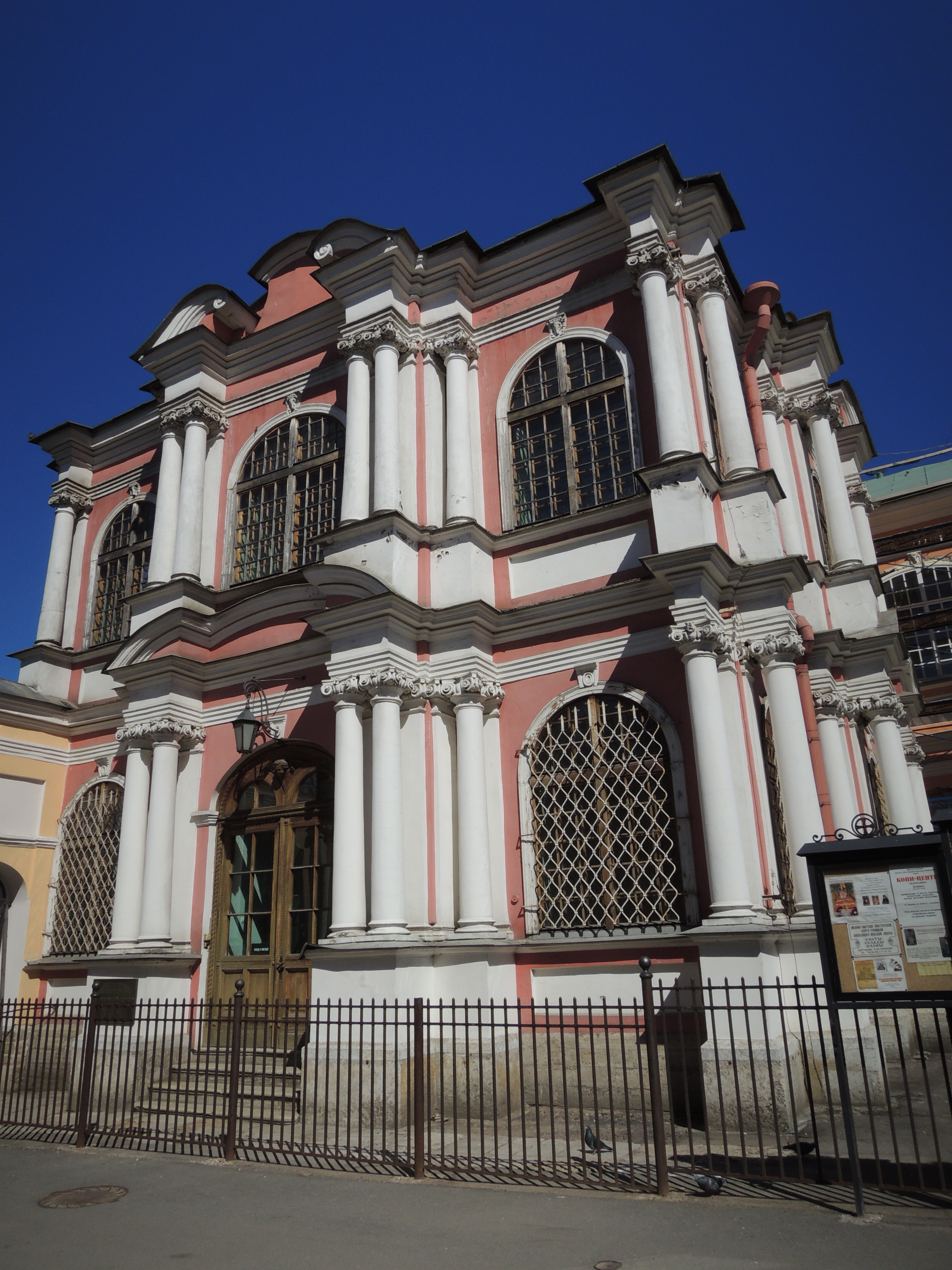
Entrance of the Annunciation Church

The church was designed by Domenico Trezzini, who had drawn up the plans for the monastery complex. Initially construction was overseen by Christof Konrad, though he was succeeded by Leonard Theodor Schwertfeger for the final stages. Construction began on 21 July 1717. It was initially planned that the ground floor would house the monastery's refectory, but this was altered to instead create a burial space for members of the royal family and prominent dignitaries. Construction was largely complete by 1719, though the finishing work took another three years. As completed the building contained two churches.

=== Upper church ===
The upper floor housed the Alexander Nevsky Church, with the relics of the saint. Peter the Great had ordered the relics of Saint Alexander Nevsky to be sent from the Church of the Nativity of the Virgin monastery in Vladimir. They were removed from Vladimir on 11 August 1723 and transported to Shlisselburg, arriving there on 20 September. There they were kept until 1724, when they were brought to Saint Petersburg and installed in the church on 30 August, the day of its consecration. The church was decorated with icons and paintings of biblical scenes by artists such as Ivan Adolsky, Ivan Nikitin, Dmitry Solovyov, Ivan Vishnyakov and Georg Gsell. The exterior walls were decorated with stucco and alabaster ornaments by Ivan and Ignatius Rossi, while the interior used blue marble. Empress Catherine donated a chandelier with crystal pendants to the church. In 1753 a large silver shrine for the relics, made with 90 pounds of silver, was donated by Empress Elizabeth of Russia. With the completion of the Holy Trinity Cathedral of the Alexander Nevsky Lavra in 1790, the shrine and relics were transferred there at its consecration on 30 August, one of the saint's feast days.

=== Lower church ===
The ground floor housed the Annunciation Church, consecrated on 25 March 1725 by Archbishop Theodosius. The alabaster details and iconostasis was by Ivan Adolsky, Ivan Nikitin and Dmitry Solovyov. Carvings were done by skilled workmen from the admiralty. Massive composite columns supported a flat ceiling with the plafond “Name of God” by Adolsky and M. L. Negrubov. The interior was illuminated with a silver chandelier, donated by Prince Alexander Danilovich Menshikov. A crypt under the church was prepared in 1720, and a two-story staircase pavilion was added to the western facade of the church between 1764 and 1765, to the design of Mikhail Rastorguev. A further extension was built in 1783, along the south-eastern part of the church, which came to house the family monuments of several noble houses, including the Shuvalovs, Betskoys, Vyazemskys and Naryshkins. A small sacristy was attached to the eastern side of the church, which later housed the Yusupov family's monuments.

== Burials ==
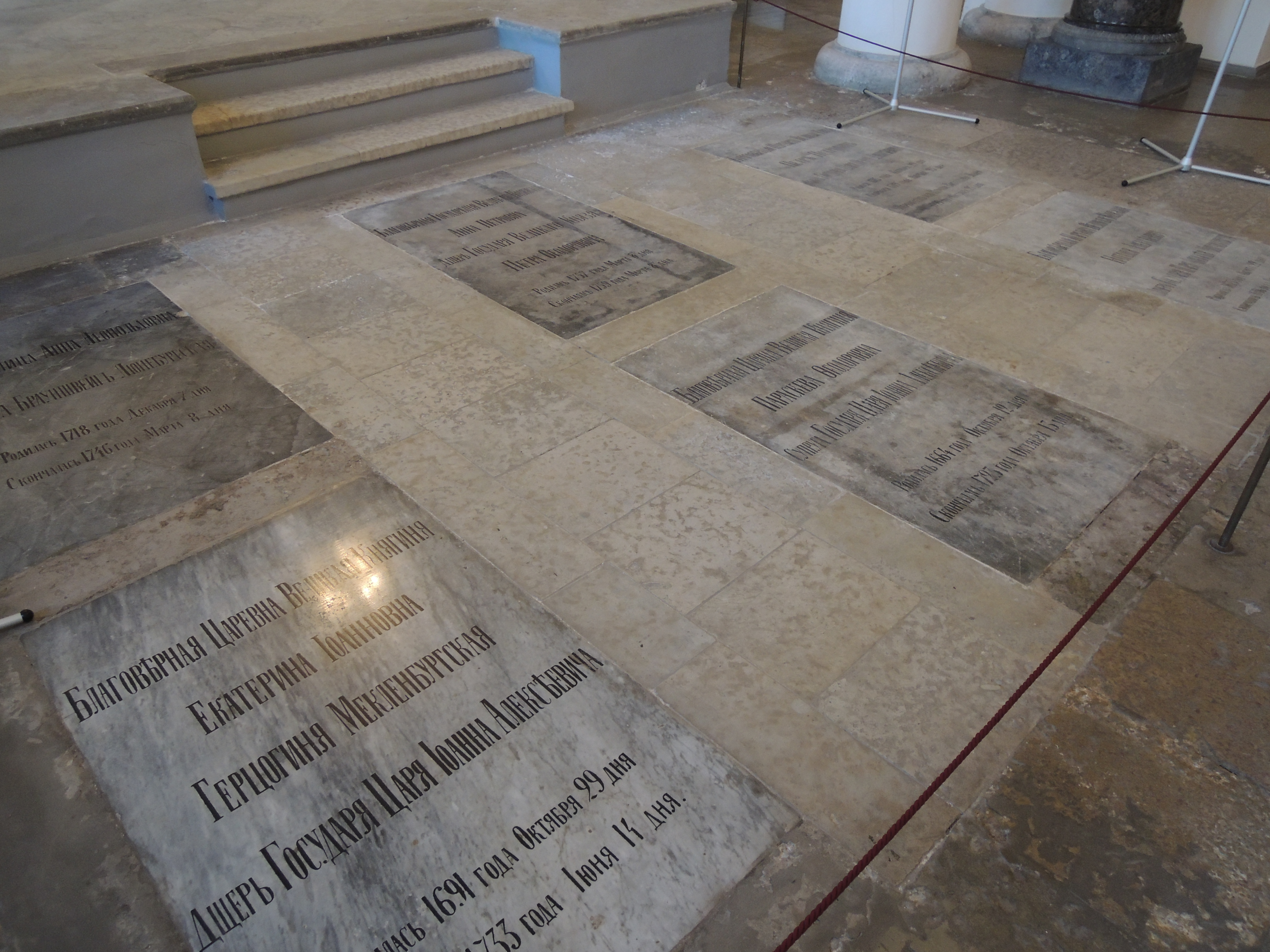
Gravemarkers of the Romanov family members

In 1720 a crypt was excavated under the church to provide 21 burial spaces. The first interment was that of Tsarina Praskovia Saltykova, the wife of Tsar Ivan V, on 24 October 1723. On Peter's orders the remains of his sister, Natalya Alexeyevna, and his infant son Peter Petrovich, who had originally been buried in the monastery's Lazarevsky Church, were transferred to the burial vault. The lower church was consecrated on 25 March 1725. Several other members of the imperial family were later buried in the church, including those who had lost their positions through palace coups. Among them were Anna Leopoldovna, mother of Tsar Ivan VI and regent during her son's brief reign; and Emperor Peter III who was deposed and killed in a palace coup that brought his wife to the throne as Empress Catherine II. Peter III was quietly interred in the church in July 1762, thus denying him burial in the traditional resting place of the post-Peter the Great rulers, the Saints Peter and Paul Cathedral. Peter III's remains were later removed from the church and reburied in the Saints Peter and Paul Cathedral on the orders of his son when he ascended to the throne as Paul I. Other members of the imperial family buried in the church include Catherine Ivanovna, Peter the Great's niece; Natalia Alexeievna, Paul I's first wife; and several children who died in infancy, including two daughters of Emperor Alexander I and Elizabeth Alexeievna; Olga Pavlovna, daughter of Emperor Paul I and Maria Feodorovna.

Those with close connections to the imperial court were also buried here. Among them were courtiers Yevdokiya Yusupova, Anastasiya Trubetskaya, and Anna Matyushkina; as well as Alexei Razumovsky, lover and rumoured husband of Empress Elizabeth; and Maria Rumyantseva, mistress of Peter the Great. Members of several important noble families were also buried here, including the Shuvalovs, Betskoys, Vyazemskys, Naryshkins, and Yusupovs. On 12 May 1800 the hero of the French Revolutionary Wars Generalissimo Alexander Suvorov was buried in the church, under a white marble slab with the simple inscription, chosen by the Generalissimo himself, "Here lies Suvorov".

== Late Imperial period ==
Repairs were carried out between 1820 and 1821, at which time a stone gateway with ornate metal doors was erected over the passage from the River Monastyrka. A more thorough reconstruction took place in 1838, which saw the iconostases in both churches replaced, and in the case of the lower church, a wooden one was installed. New paintings were produced by A. I. Grigoriev, and the churches were re-consecrated by Georgian Metropolitan Iona on 21 December 1838 and 29 August 1841. In the 1860s the lower church was re-painted by M. N. Troshchinsky, while the Yakunchikov family had a small crypt built in its north-western corner. In 1871 P. D. Sokhansky built a marble tomb for the Bobrinsky family under the staircase annex.

== Soviet period ==
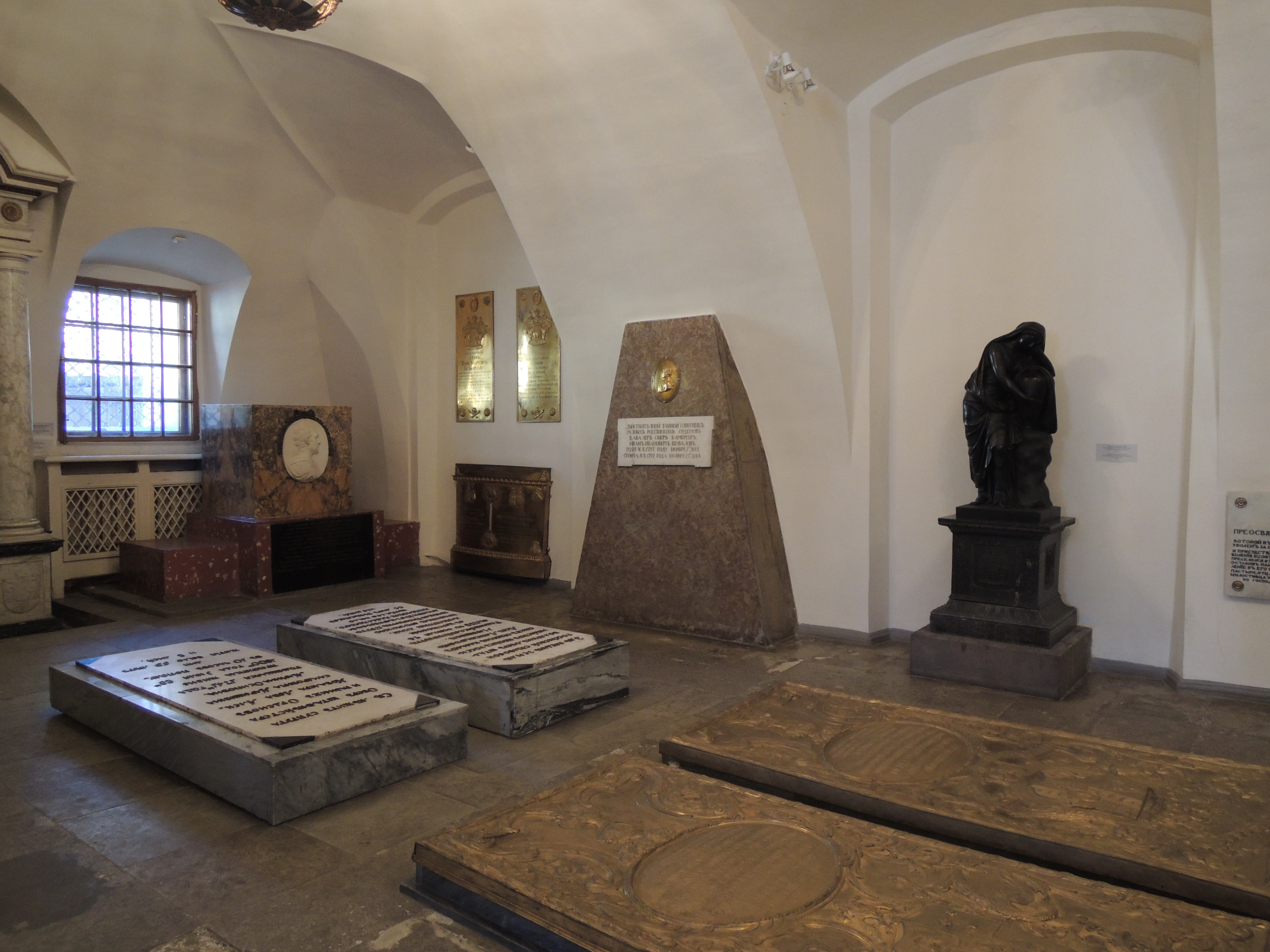
The upper church. Examples of different funerary monuments.

The church was closed on 15 February 1933. The lower Annunciation Church was handed over to the forerunner of the State Museum of Urban Sculpture, which had taken over the Lavra's Lazarevskoe and Tikhvin Cemeteries to run as museum necropolises. The upper church was divided up into smaller rooms to provide office space. It was used for a time by the geodesic survey department of Giprogor Institute. Little was done to protect the funerary monuments, despite a letter from Maxim Gorky to Andrei Zhdanov urging action. The church was used as a warehouse, and furnaces were installed. During this period some of the funerary monuments from the Lavra's Nikolo-Fyodorovskaya and Isidorovskaya churches, which had been closed in 1931, were moved to the lower Annunciation Church. In 1940 the entire building was transferred to the State Museum of Urban Sculpture. The memorials of Napoleonic military leaders Mikhail Miloradovich and Dmitry Senyavin were placed in the church after the closure of the Dukhovskaya Church, while those of Ivan Lazarev and Gerasim Lebedev were brought from other locations as part of a general clearing of cemeteries and the concentration of funerary monuments into centralised museum necropolises. In other instances parts of memorials, such as plaques and reliefs from the monuments of Alexei Turchaninov and Anna Vorontsova in the Lavra's Lazarevskoe Cemetery were installed in the church. In the case of sculptor Mikhail Kozlovsky, his monument was transferred from the Smolensky Cemetery to the Lazarevskoe in 1931, with some of the reliefs installed in the Annunciation Church.

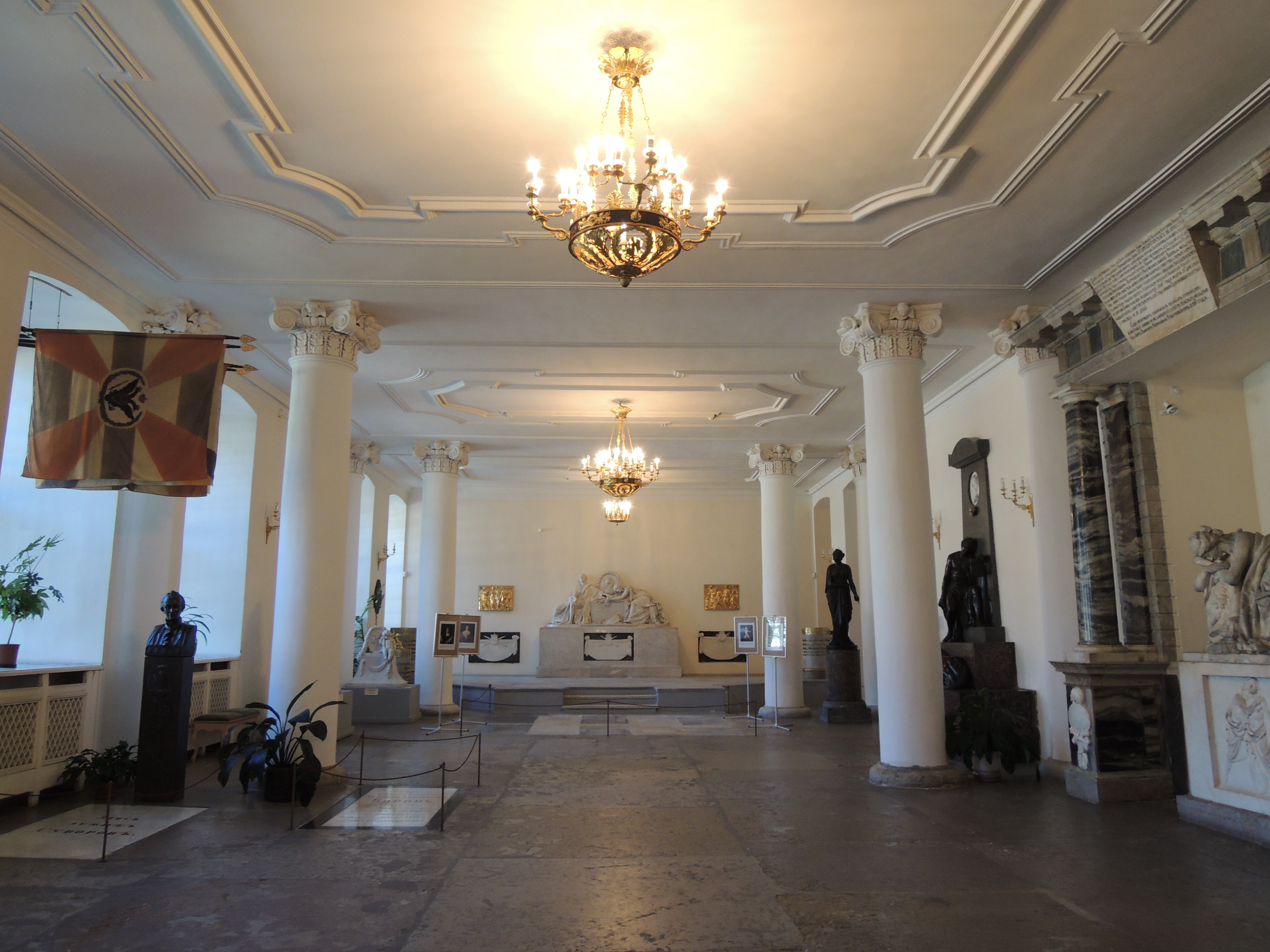
The lower church, the grave of Alexander Suvorov at left

Some repair work was carried out during the Second World War, when a military hospital opened in the grounds of the monastery during the siege of Leningrad. Suvorov's grave became a source of patriotic inspiration, and in November 1942 the grave was repaired and decorated with panels and flags. Soldiers defending Leningrad would also visit to pay their respects. After repairs, the building opened on 15 May 1950 as a museum display of historic funerary monuments under the auspices of the State Museum of Urban Sculpture. Between 1988 and 1999 a complex restoration of the Annunciation Church took place. After the fall of the Soviet Union the church building remained in the ownership of the State Museum of Urban Sculpture, despite requests by the Orthodox Church for its return. On 7 April 2013, the 300th anniversary of the monastery, vice-governor of Saint Petersburg Vasily Kichedzhi announced that the Annunciation Church would be returned to the Alexander Nevsky Lavra. The return of the church to the monastery authorities has however been complicated by questions around the ownership of the memorials.
