= Anna Matyushkina =

Russian courtier (1722–1824)

Anna Alekseevna Matyushkina
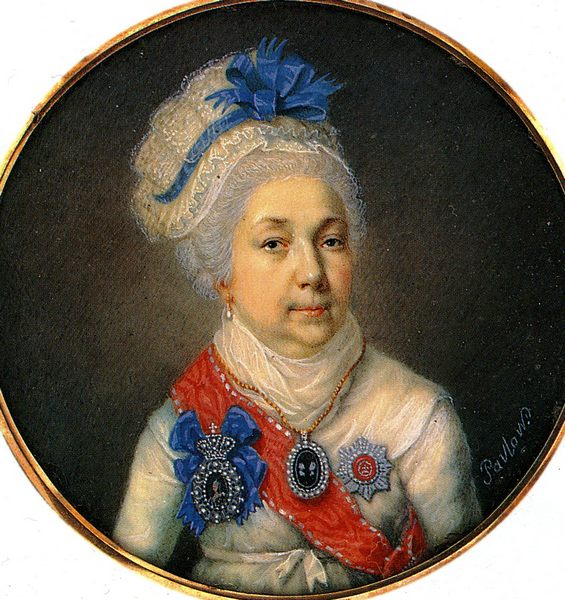
- Born: 1722
- Died: 3 May 1804 (aged 81–82)
- Noble family: Gagarin
- Spouse: Dmitry Mikhailovich Matyushkin
- Issue: Sofia Dmitrievna Matyushkina
- Father: Alexei Matveevich Gagarin
- Mother: Anna Petrovna Shafirova

Princess Anna Alekseevna Gagarina married Matyushkina(1722-1804), was a Russian courtier. She served as Maid of Honour to Empress Elizabeth I, State Lady to Catherine the Great, and Ober-Hoffmeisterin to Empress Maria Feodorvna She married in 1754 to count Dmitry Mikhailovich Matyushkin.

== Biography ==
Anna was the eldest sister of Matvey Alekseevich Gagarin and granddaughter of Prince Matvey Petrovich Gagarin on her father's side, and on her mother's, she was a granddaughter of Peter Shafirov, who served under Peter the Great as Vice-Chancellor. She had two other sisters who were Maids of Honour to Grand Duchess Catherine Alekseevna. In 1746, one of her sisters died from fever, and Elizabeth I called for Anna from Moscow to take her sister's place. Her remaining sister, Daria Alekseevna, married the fiancée of their deceased sister Prince Alexander Mikhailovich Golitsyn.

At the end of 1748, Anna was with Catherine, Pytor, and Empress Elizabeth who was visiting Alexei Razumovsky in the village of Gostilitsy where he had purpose built a palace in order to house the Imperial family when they came to visit. About six o'clock in morning the foundation began to collapse, there had been several loud cracks heard over night, by morning sentries observed large stone slabs falling out from under the house and the house began to sink. Among the seriously wounded from this incident was Princess Gagarina. In her attempt to escape the house, she had passed through the small kitchen attached to her bedroom where a stove collapsed, killing three footmen who slept nearby and broke the divider, pushing Gagarina onto the bed where several bricks fell on her head, seriously wounding her and the maid who had tried to escape with her.

In her memoirs, Catherine the Great mentioned Anna's benevolence more than once, who of all her maids of honour, she describes as the most devoted to her, and this was shown in her practice. She first acted as messenger in a romance between the Grand Duchess and Zakhar Chernyshev, when she realised what was growing between the few, she scolded Catherine for putting her in such danger, and refused to dispatch the love letters anymore. As seen by the tone of her writhng, the Grand Duchess took no offense to this, and even describes Princess Gagarina as 'hating' Saltykov, a favourite of the Empress and experiencing grief when Gagarina had to leave court when she eventually married.

Gagarina was not well liked my Elizabeth I, who in response of Gagarina's liking of Ivan Shuvalov, a favourite of the empress, often reprimanded her outfits and formally forbid her from wearing certain fashionable dresses. Wanting to alienate Gagarina from the court, the empress assisted her in arranging the marriage between herself and Matyushkin. She persuaded the prince's mother, who didn't want her son to marry the princess who was 38, and considered ugly. The arrangement was helped by the fact that Anna was heir to her childless brother's fortune. They were married 6 November 1754, not long after the birth of the future Paul I of Russia.

== Later life ==
Despite the loss of her favourite maid of honour, Catherine was happy to see her happily married, and still maintained a strong relationship with her. In 1759, Anna was present at the death of Catherine's youngest child Grand Duchess Anna Petrovna, who was only one year old. She accompanied the child to the Nevsky Monastery where she was on duty until the burial of the child.

On the date of Catherine II's coronation, Matyushkina was appointed the position of Statsdame ahead of even Yekaterina Vorontsova-Dashkova.

In 1774, her husband, Dmitri fell from honour as he was seen as dissent between the young Tsarevich Pavel Petrovich and his newly appointed tutor Ivan Saltykov, telling the student that Saltykov was sent to spy on him for his mother, as he desired the position. As a result, the Count was banned from appearing at court, as such Matyushkina had to retreat to the family's estates. Mikhail Shcherbatov scolded the empress for this decision, saying that even though Countess Matyushkina had been there for her through thick and thin had "finally became discarded".

After the death of Catherine the Great, Paul I appointed her Ober-Hoffmeisterin in memory of her service to the court of his father. She was the first courtier to wear the insignia on the right side of her body. Due to her old age, she could not attend the coronation, regardless, she was granted the Order of Saint Catherine first class, and later send miniature portraits of himself and his wife for her to wear.

== Family ==
In Saint Petersburg, she owned a mansion located at 55 Bolshaya Morskaya Street and a property on Nevsky Prospect opposite the Chicherin House. Upon the death of her brother she also inherited the Trekhgornoye and Sennitsy estates near Moscow. She died on 3 May 1804, and is buried in the Nevsky Monastery near the Announciation Church. She and her husband had two children.

- Sophia (1755-1796), served as a maid of honour to Catherine the Great, known for her beauty. Married the Polish immigrant Yuri Vielgorsky in 1788. She died three weeks after giving birth to her youngest child, leaving behind seven children, who were raised by their grandmother, Anna.
- Nicholas (1756-1775), who was brought up alongside Paul I, and accompanied him in masquerades. Buried in the Donskoy Monastery
