= Ober–Shtalmeyster =

Court position in Russian Empire

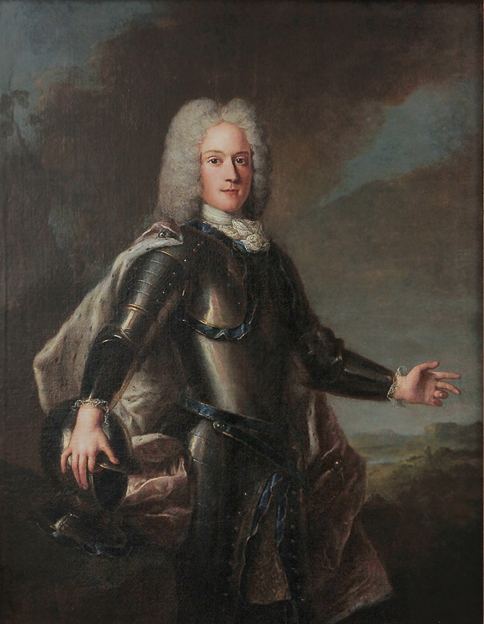
Prince Alexander Borisovich Kurakin (1697–1749) – Senator, Ober-Stallmeister, diplomat

The Ober-Stallmeister (Russian: Обер-шталмейстер, from German: Oberstallmeister, lit. 'senior head of the stable') was a post (rank) in the Tsardom of Russia and the Russian Empire, from 4 February 1722 – a court rank of the 3rd class in the Table of Ranks (in 1766 it was moved to the 2nd class of the table).

Like other court officials, abolished after the February Revolution – from 17 March 1917, in connection with the liquidation of the institution of imperial power.

== See also ==
- Stallmeister
