= Anna Vorontsova =

Russian lady in waiting, salonist and noble

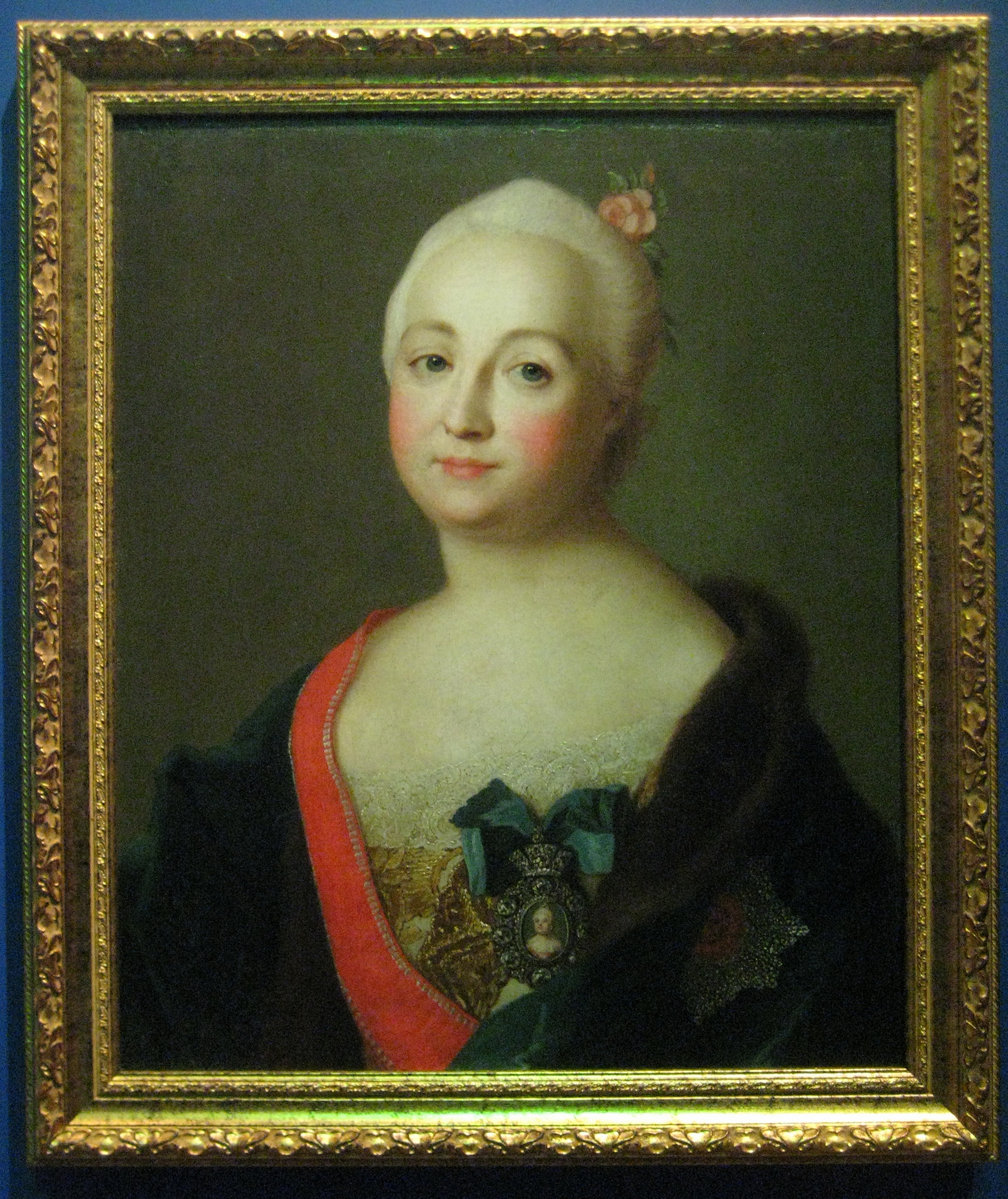
Anna Vorontsova

Countess Anna Karlovna Vorontsova, née Countess Skavronskaya (18 December [O.S. 2 December] 1722 – 11 January 1776 [O.S. 31 December 1775]), was a Russian lady in waiting, salonist and noble, cousin of the Empress Elizabeth of Russia. She was married to Chancellor Count Mikhail Illarionovich Vorontsov.

== Life ==
She was the daughter of the elder brother of Catherine I of Russia, Karl Samoilovich Skavronsky, and Marya Ivanovna. She was made a maid of honor at the court of her cousin, princess Elizabeth, and the two girls were brought up together. Elizabeth was very fond of her cousin, and on 31 January 1742—a year after her accession to the throne—she had her marry Mikhail Illarionovich Vorontsov. On 25 April, she was made lady in waiting. Anna Karlovna loved fine arts, and her house was constantly visited by artists, writers, scientists, government people. She was described as beautiful, kind, charming and temperamental.

Anna Karlovna was constantly in the vicinity of the Empress, and Elizabeth was often informally in her home, where she met with all the foreign residents at the Russian court, and thanks to his spouse, her husband the Grand Chancellor exerted influence in foreign policy.

On 9 February 1760 Anna Karlovna received the Order of St. Catherine's great cross. On 29 June 1760 Anna Karlovna was made chief gofmeysteriny.

In the short reign of Peter III of Russia, the Vorontsovs belonged entirely to the party of the Emperor and is among those who accompanied him on 28 June 1762 in flight in the galley of Oranienbaum in Kronstadt.

Widowed in 1767, the Countess Anna Karlovna did not play a prominent role at court, although the Tsarevich Pavel Petrovich called her aunt.
