= Tsarevna Natalya Alexeyevna of Russia =

Natalya Alexeyevna
- Tsarevna of Russia
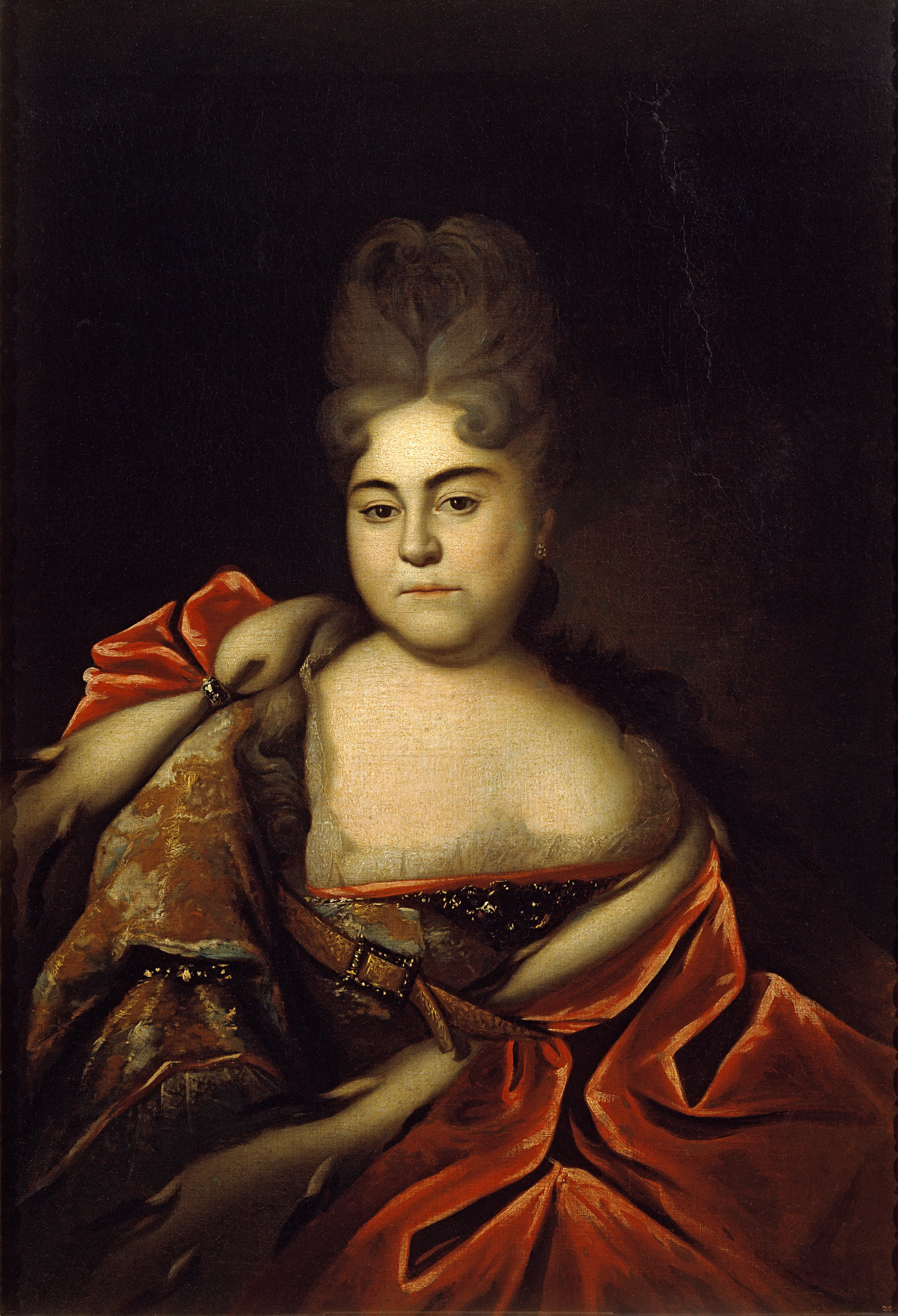
- Portrait by Ivan Nikitin
- Born: 22 August 1673
- Died: 18 June 1716 (aged 42)
- House: Romanov
- Father: Alexis I of Russia
- Mother: Natalia Naryshkina

Tsarevna Natalya Alexeyevna of Russia (Russian: Наталья Алексеевна Романова; 22 August 1673 – 18 June 1716) was a Russian playwright. She was the elder daughter of Tsar Alexis and his second wife, Natalia Naryshkina, and the sister of Peter the Great.

== Life ==
Natalia shared the difficulties of her mother and brother during the regency of her half-sister, Tsarevna Sophia. She was very close to her brother Peter. She shared Peter's wish to reform Russia to a Western country, it was said that "she loved everything that her brother liked", and she supported his ideas from their childhood. During his reign, Peter thought it was important to inform his sister about his achievements and the affairs of the state, and every time he won a victory, he either informed her personally or had Golovin and Menshikov do so.

She was young when Peter instituted his Western reforms, and in contrast to her half-sisters, it was not hard for her to adjust to the new ideals. Her position was also raised after Peter separated from his first spouse Eudoxia Lopukhina in 1698 and she thereby became the hostess of Peter's court. It was at her court that Peter met his lovers Anisya Kirillovna and Varvara Michajlovna Arsen'eva. Natalia was never married, and there is nothing to indicate that Peter ever contemplated arranging a marriage for his sister – he preferred to have her with him.

In 1708, she moved to Saint Petersburg, but she was often in Moscow as her own palace was not ready (it was built in 1713). Peter gave her the Gatchina estate and built the first palace there for her. Natalia founded the first hospital in Saint Petersburg in her house. In 1706–07, she founded the first Russian theatre in Moscow in her house, with actors taken from the staff of her and Praskovia Saltykova's court: the first public Russian theatre was later founded after her example in 1709. In Saint Petersburg, she arranged theatre performances for the court and nobility from 1710.

She also wrote plays. Among those confirmed to be by her are:

- "Комедия о святой Екатерине" (The Comedy of Saint Catherine)
- "Хрисанф и Дария" (Chrysanthus and Daria)
- "Цезарь Оттон" (Caesar Otto)
- "Святая Евдокия" (Saint Evdokia)

In her work as a playwright, she served her brother's reforms: her plays compared the old customs negatively to the reforms.

She was present at the conversion of her second sister-in-law Catherine to the Russian Orthodox faith. In 1715, there were signs that the relationship between the siblings had worsened, and she visited her former sister-in-law Eudoxia in her exile. She died of a stomach catarrh in 1716.

She is portrayed in the novel Peter I by Aleksey Tolstoy.

== Sources ==
- "Наталья Алексеевна, дочь царя Алексея Михайловича" . Brockhaus and Efron Encyclopedic Dictionary (in Russian). 1906.
