= Dmitri Sheremetev =

Russian aristocrat

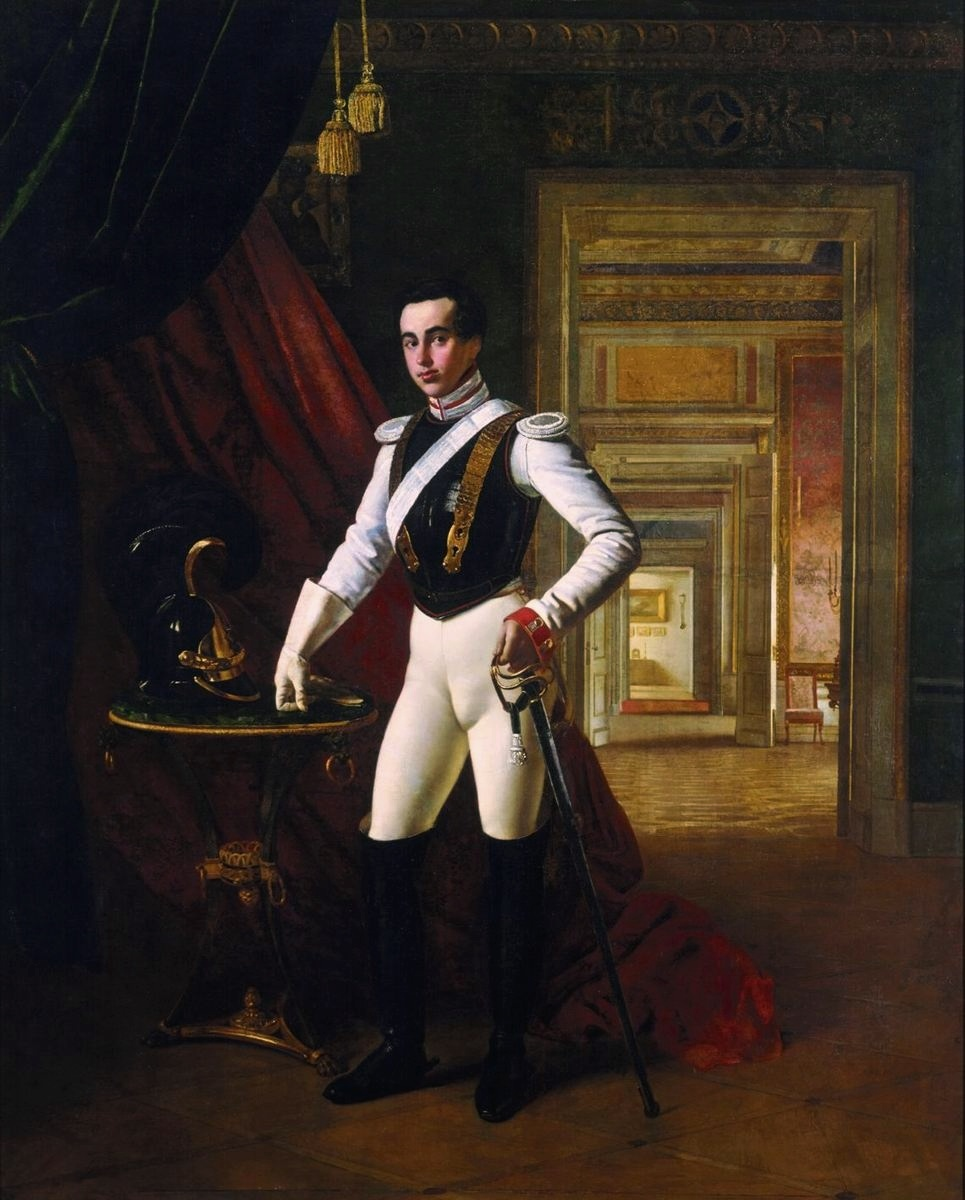
Dmitri Sheremetev

Dmitri Nikolaevich Sheremetev (Russian: Дмитрий Николаевич Шереметев; 3 January 1803 in Saint Petersburg- 12 September 1871 in Kuskovo) was a Russian aristocratic, member of the Sheremetev family. He was the only son of Nikolai Sheremetev and Praskovia Kovalyova-Zhemchugova and the father of Aleksandr Sheremetev and Sergey Sheremetev.

== Ancestry ==
Ancestors of Prince Dmitri Nikolaevich Sheremetev

16. Pyotr Vasilievich Sheremetev
8. Count Boris Petrovich Sheremetev
17. Anna Fyodorovna Volynskaya
4. Count Pyotr Borisovich Sheremetev
18. Pyotr Petrovich Saltykov
9. Anna Petrovna Saltykova
19. Marfa Ivanovna Prozorovskaya
2. Count Nikolai Petrovich Sheremetev
20. Prince Mikhail Yakovlevich Cherkassky
10. Prince Alexey Mikhailovich Cherkassky
21. Princess Marfa Nikitična Odoevskaya
5. Princess Varvara Alekseyevna Cherkasskaya
22. Prince Yuriy Yuryevich Trubeckoy
11. Princess Mariya Yuryevna Trubeckaya
23. Princess Elena Grigoryevna Cherkasskaya
Count Dmitri Nikolaevich Sheremetev
6. Ivan Stepanovich Gorbunov
3. Praskovia Kovalyova-Zhemchugova
