= Józef Kozłowski =

Polish-Russian composer

Józef Kozłowski (Russian: О́сип Анто́нович Козло́вский, romanized: Osip Antonovich Kozlovsky, also Иосиф or Юзеф; 1757/1759 – 11 March [O.S. 27 February] 1831) was a Russian composer of Polish origin.

== Biography ==
For the most part of his life Józef Kozłowski was attached to the Russian Imperial Court, for which he wrote most of his music. In Russia he became popular especially for his patriotic polonaises.

Sources vary as to Kozłowski's time and place of birth. The Polish academia traditionally considers him as a native of Warsaw, born on 10 September 1759. According to the Encyclopedia of Literature and Art of Belarus (1985), he was born in 1757 in Kozlovichi manor near Propoysk (modern Slawharad, Belarus). Author of encyclopedia entry V. D. Bobrovsky based his claim on the data from a metric book he found in Sokolovo, Slawharad District. An obituary in Northern Bee, presumably written by Thaddeus Bulgarin, described Kozłowski as a "descendant of Belarusian nobility."

Kozłowski's uncle, Vasily Fyodorovich Trutovsky (a famous hussler in his time), noticing his nephew's musical abilities, took him to study in St. John's Church in Warsaw, where the young musician received a musical education and underwent practice as a chanter, violinist and organist.

For many years Kozlowski was associated with the Polish magnate family of the Oginskys, where he taught music to his children: his eldest daughter Jozefa and his youngest son Michal Kleofas, the future author of the famous polonaise Pożegnanie Ojczyzny (Farewell to the Homeland). Kozlowski came to the Oginsky's at the age of 16, his pupil Cleophas was then 8 years old. The lessons lasted about 6 years: from 1773 to 1778. Michal Cleophas Oginsky himself mentioned the completion of the lessons in 1778 in his memoirs. Kozlowski's friendly contacts with Oginsky lasted all his life, more closely until 1786. Kozlowski taught the little Oginsky piano and later composition. Cleophas learned to play the violin from the famous violinist Ivan Mane Jarnowicz, at whose funeral in 1804 Kozlowski's Requiem was also performed. Together with his pupil, Kozlowski visited Slonim - the estate of Mikhail Kazimir Oginsky, Cleophas' uncle.

He moved to Russia in 1786, where he became involved in the war against Turkey. He entered the army as aide-de-camp to Prince Dolgoruky. Soon he became known to Prince Grigory Potemkin, the prime minister (and accredited lover of Catherine II) between 1774 and 1776. Impressed by the musical talent of Kozłowski, Potemkin introduced him to the Court. While in Russia, he maintained contacts with the St Petersburg Polish community. He probably took part in the musical evenings held at the St Petersburg residences of King Stanisław August Poniatowski, who commissioned from Kozłowski the Missa pro defunctis es-moll (1798), known as the Requiem.

In 1791 he wrote the music for the unofficial Russian national anthem of the late 18th and early 19th centuries Grom pobedy, razdavaysya! ("Let the thunder of victory rumble!"), text by Gavrila Derzhavin. The second part of this polonaise was later quoted by Peter Tchaikovsky in the final scene of his opera The Queen of Spades.

When the private theatre of Count Nikolai Sheremetev was transferred from Kuskovo to Ostankino, Kozłowski's opera (lyrical drama) Zelmira and Smelon, or the Capture of Izmail (Russian: Зельмира и Смелон, или Взятие Измаила) to a text by Pavel Potemkin, was premiered on 22 July 1795. The famous serf soprano Praskovya Zhemchugova acted the role of the captive Turkish woman Zelmira. The opera was revived and performed again on 28 August 2004 at the same place in Ostankino.

Between 1799 and 1819 Kozłowski supervised the theatre orchestras and the theatrical college at St Petersburg. Kozłowski composed a famous Requiem Mass in E flat minor Missa pro defunctis for the death of Stanisław August Poniatowski, the King of Poland (1732–1798), commissioned by the King himself before his death and performed on 25 February 1798 in St Petersburg. The second version (1825), already without horn orchestra (and most probably also organ, judging by the only recording of this opus made in Russia in 1988 by «Melody») was prepared by the composer for the funeral of Russian Emperor Alexander I. Naturally the latter was an orthodox Christian, but the Requiem was needed for his death for one apparently formal reason: Alexander I also held the title of monarch of the Kingdom of Poland (1815-1825). The last time the Requiem was performed in its original form in St Petersburg was in 1804; it was revived following extensive research and a new Urtext edition by Hans Graf, Music Director of the Singapore Symphony Orchestra for its Asian premiere in 2023. The last performance of the second version was in 2004 (Bolshoi Hall of the St Petersburg Philharmonic). His considerable production included stage music for Edip v Afinakh (Oedipus in Athens, 1804), Fingal (tragedy by V. Ozerov, 1805), Tsar Edip (Oedipus Rex) (1816), Esther (by Racine 1816), liturgical music including the Te Deum, cantatas, choruses, songs (including 28 Russian songs), about 70 polonaises and other dance music for the court balls, etc.

== Quotations ==
- "Prince Grigory Potemkin celebrated the great victory giving a ball in his palace in St Petersburg which opened with a polonaise dedicated to Alexander Suvorov. One of Suvorov’s musically endowed officers, Józef Kozłowski, was commissioned by Potemkin to write this musical dedication which he diligently did exactly on time." Music Tales: Military Music

== Recordings ==
- Music at the Court of St Petersburg, Vol. 2, Composers: Bortnyansky, Teplov, Kozłowski, etc.; Performer: Iana Ivanilova; Label: Opus 111; Catalogue Number: OPS30179; Released: 7 April 1997; Audio CD DDD

The tracks include the following works by Józef Kozłowski:

- Almen nel ciel pietoso (If only in merciful heaven)
- Polonaise, Pastorale
- Polonaise on a theme by Noccolo Piccini
- Milaya vechor sidela (In the evening, seated beside the stream)
- Polonaise, Fantaisie No 01
- Placido zeffiretto (Gentle Breeze)
- I Long for You Constantly
- Please, Madam, polonaise (piano)
- I Want to Be a Little Bird (piano)
- Last Night My Darling was Sitting (piano)
- Ruby-Red Dawn is Already Glowing (piano)
- Where, o Where Can I Hide Myself (piano)

- Requiem in Latin and Salve Regina (Реквием для солистов, хора и оркестра) - Galina Simkina, Lidya Tchernykh, Valentina Panina, Konstantin Lisovsky, Vladimir Motorin, Moscow State Choir, USSR Ministry of Culture SO, cond. Vladimir Yesipov. Label: Melodiya, ADD, 1988.
