= Argunov =

Argunov - family of artists and architects, serfs of counts Sheremetev. They worked in Moscow and in Sheremetev's mansions (Kuskovo, Ostankino, etc.), and also in St.Petersburg.

- Fedor Leontyevich Argunov (1716–1754) - the painter.
- Fedor Semenovich Argunov (about 1732 - 1768) - the cousin of painter I. P. Argunov. He probably studied at S. I. Chevakinski in St.Petersburg. He participated in construction of a house of Sheremetev on Fontanka (1750–1755) and lived in St.Petersburg. He was the author of the project of a Kitchen wing (1755), Grotto (1755 - 1775), Greenhouses (presumably, 1761–1762) and other constructions in style of a baroque in mansion Kuskovo.
- Ivan Petrovich Argunov (1729 - 1802) - the painter, one of ancestors of a chamber portrait in Russian art (portraits К. А. and H. M. Khripunov - both 1757, in Ostankino Palace-museum; "The Unknown person in Russian suit", 1784).
- Pavel Ivanovich Argunov (about 1768–1806) - the architect. He was the son of I. P. Argunov. From 1793 he headed construction of wooden palace-theatre in mansion Ostankino near Moscow (it is constructed in style of Russian classicism) in which under his projects a number of interiors was created.
- Nikolai Ivanovich Argunov (1771 - 1829) - the painter, the academician of the St.Petersburg Academy of arts (1818). The son of I. P. Argunov. His products: classical portraits of T. V. Granatova (1789), Praskovya Ivanovna Zhemchugova in a red shawl (1802–1803) - both in the Museum of ceramics in Kuskovo.

== Other Argunovs ==
- P. P. Argunov, designer of the Argunov–Cassegrain telescope in 1963–1972
