= Francesco Camporesi =

Italian architect, painter, engraver and educator

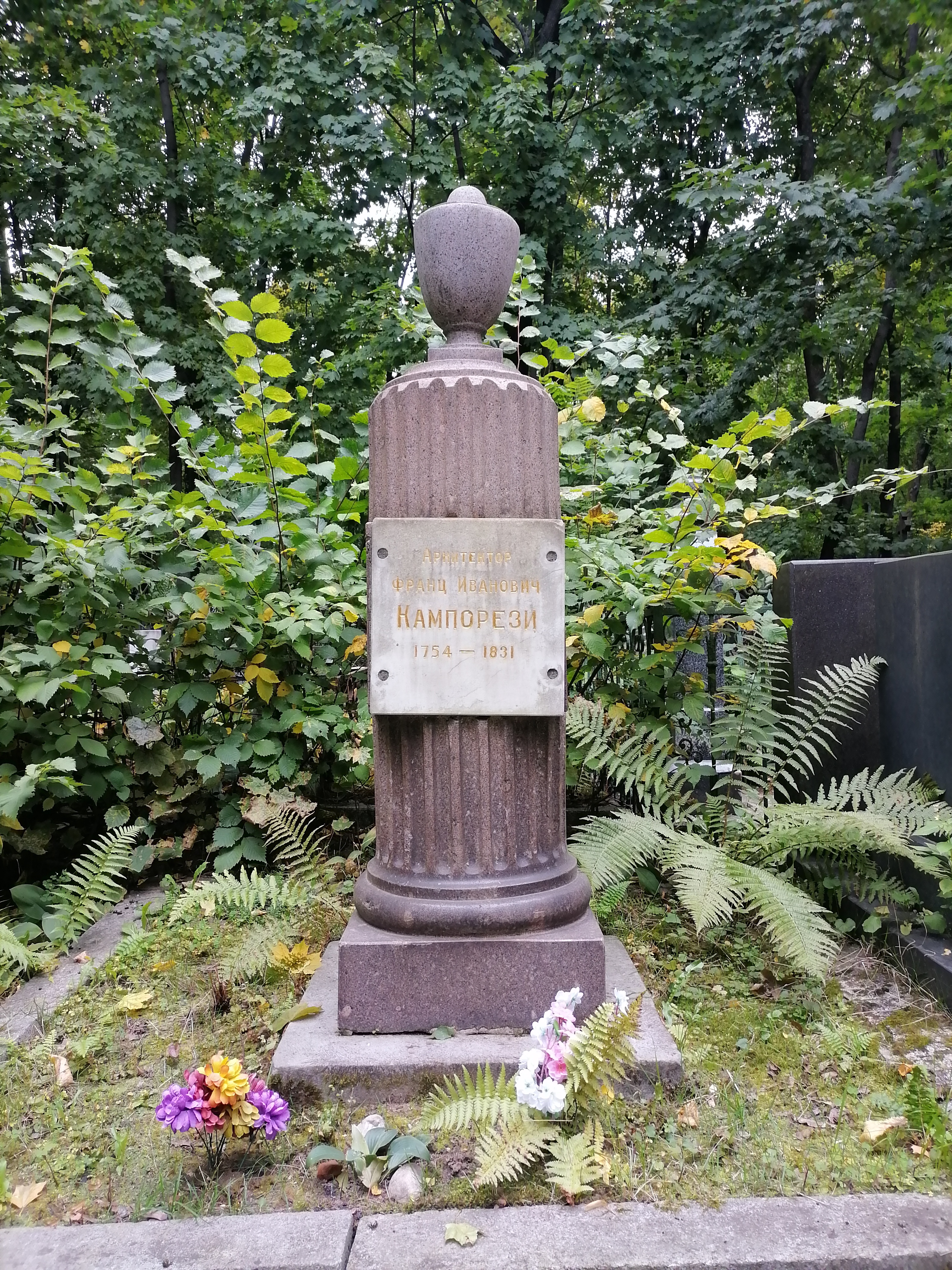
Camporesi grave at Vvedenskoye Cemetery. The text (in post-1918 orthography), contrary to encyclopaedic sources, states year of birth as 1754.

Francesco Camporesi (1747, Bologna – 1831, Moscow) was an Italian architect, painter, engraver and educator who worked in Moscow in 1780s-1820s. Most of his architectural work perished in the Fire of 1812, was severely altered, demolished or otherwise lost.

== Biography ==
Camporesi arrived in Russia in the 1780s, probably as an assistant to Giacomo Quarenghi. Extent of his architectural work in 18th century remains disputed, and he is better known as a fine vedutist who documented Moscow prior to the devastating Fire of 1812.

For a decade (1784–1796) Camporesi worked under Quarenghi and Karl Blank on the Catherine's Palace in Moscow, where he was employed both as an architect and a plasterer craftsman. Eventually, he developed into a generalist architect: capable of independently managing construction projects, Camporesi was regularly employed by private clients - for his design talents as well as business capabilities. His input to Nikolai Sheremetev's Ostankino Palace, for example, included interior design, architectural drafts of palace expansion, and also budget schedules and hiring craftsmen.

Works by the architect are best preserved in the vicinity of Yakhroma, in former estates of Apraksin and Sheremetev families. Camporesi also left a significant legacy of unbuilt architectural drafts (preserved at the Moscow Museum of Architecture), including an unusual large octagonal structure codenamed Moscow House. Contemporary studies fail to explain the purpose of this elaborate project; probably, its octagonal plan was a homage to Saint Michael's Castle, commissioned by one of emperor Paul's statesmen and discarded after Paul's death.

In 1810s-1820s Camporesi was employed by the Commission of Moscow Kremlin; in addition to restoration of Kremlin buildings he coached students of the Kremlin school of architecture, most notably Domenico Giliardi and Afanasy Grigoriev.

== Extant architectural works ==
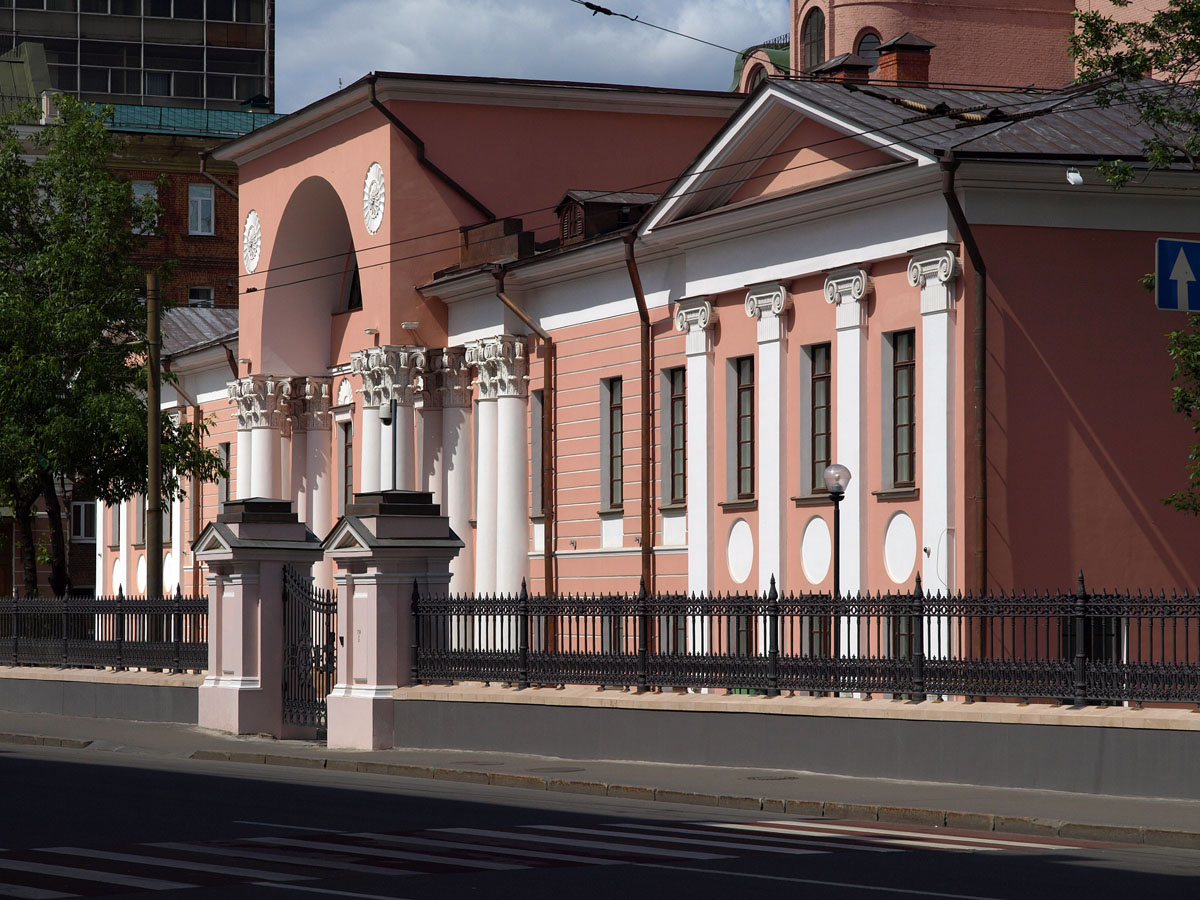
Lobanov-Rostovsky House, 1790s

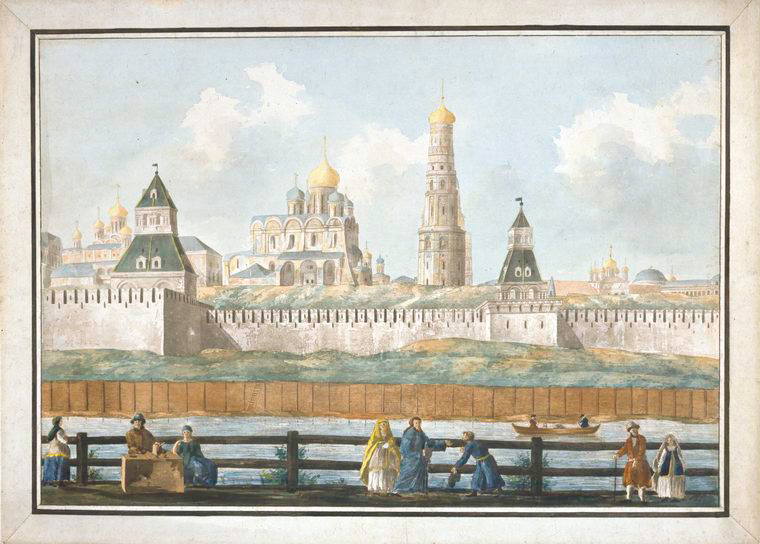
Panorama of Kremlin, 1780s

Undisputed works:

- Main hall and master plan of count Apraksin Olgovo estate, near Yakhroma, 1790s

Attributed with more or less certainty:

- Theater hall of Ostankino Palace
- Church of The Protection of the Mother of God in countess Orlova Andreevskoe estate near Yakhroma, 1803-1821
- Church of Ascension of Jesus in count Apraksin Peremilovo estate, near Yakhroma, 1792–1801
- Lobanov-Rostovsky house at 43, Myasnitskaya Street, Moscow
