= Sheremetev Fortress Theatre =

The Sheremetev Fortress Theatre was a historic theatre in Moscow in Russia, active from the 1760s to at least 1797. It was the Moscow stage of the famous serf theatre of Pyotr Sheremetev and Nikolai Sheremetev. It was also used as a school, as the Sheremetev family trained serfs in drama, opera and ballet here before having them perform.
