= Sheremetev =

Russian noble family of Prussian origin

The coat of arms of Count Sheremetev
- Crest: Issuant from the coronet of rank an oak tree proper between two mullets of six points argent
- Shield: Or in chief on a torteau surrounded by a wreath of laurel a royal crown and two crosses pattée argent in pale and in base between a boyar's hat fesswise and a crescent charged with a representation of a man's face argent a sword and spear crossed in saltire proper, the whole ensigned by the coronet of a Count of the Russian Empire.
- Supporters: Two lions salient guardant Or the dexter one holding in his interior paw a sceptre and in his mouth a laurel branch proper the sinister one holding in his interior paw a globus cruciger and in his mouth an olive branch proper upon a grassy compartment proper
- Motto: Deus conservat omnia, Latin for "God preserves all".
- Other elements: The mantling, or doubled gules.

The House of Sheremetev (Russian: Шереме́тевы) was one of the wealthiest and most influential Russian noble families, descending from Feodor Koshka.

== History ==
The family held many high commanding ranks in the Russian military, governorships and eventually the rank of Count of the Russian Empire.

== Notable members ==
- Yelena Sheremeteva, third wife of Tsarevich Ivan Ivanovich (1554–1581), son of Ivan the Terrible.
- Fedor Sheremetev (1570–1650) cousin of Tsar Michael I and head of government in 1613–18 and 1642–46
- Vasily Borisovich Sheremetev (1622–1682) fought in Ukraine
- Count Boris Sheremetev (1652–1719) military leader and diplomat during the Great Northern War
- Count Pyotr Borisovich Sheremetev (1713—1788) son of Boris; courtier and noted patron of Russian theater
- Princess Natalia Borisovna Dolgorukova, daughter of Boris and wife of Prince Ivan Dolgorukov
- Count Nikolai Petrovich Sheremetev (1751–1809) son of Pyotr; noted patron of Russian theater
- Praskovia Kovalyova-Zhemchugova, a serf woman belonging to the Sheremetev family, who became an actress in the Sheremetev Serf Theatre and later married Nikolai Sheremetev
- Count Aleksandr Dmitriyevich Sheremetev (1859–1931) grandson of Nikolai and son of Dmitri; conductor, composer and entrepreneur
- Romuald Szeremietiew (born 1945), Polish politician and independence activist in the Confederation of Independent Poland.

The Sheremetyevo International Airport, built in the 1950s and named from the nearby settlement of Sheremetevskiy (dating from about 1901), from its railway-station Sheremetevskaya and from the railway-line founder Sergei Dmitrievich Sheremetev (1844-1918), indirectly commemorates the family.

== Etymology ==
Russian surnames are gender sensitive, the masculine form of the name being Sheremetev (Шереметев) and the feminine being rendered as Sheremeteva (Шереметева).

There are three theories about the origin of the surname, all of them indicate a Tatar and eastern origin for the family. One theory proposes that the name originated with the Turkic Chuvash language word seremet (шеремет), meaning "poor man". Another theory translates the nickname Seremet as "having light steps", "hot" (about a horse), while the third theory suggests that the name originates with the Tatar/Turkic-Persian shir Akhmat, which literally translates to "Tiger Ahmet" and can be read as both "brave Ahmet" and "Pious Ahmet."
