= Ostankino =

Ostankino may refer to:

- Ostankino District, Moscow
- Ostankino Technical Center, Moscow, a television studio and technical center
- Ostankino Tower, a free-standing television and radio tower in Moscow
- Ostankino Palace, a former summer residence and private opera theater of Sheremetev family
- Channel One Russia, formerly run by Russian State TV and Radio Company Ostankino
- Ostankino (broadcaster), defunct state television and radio company
