= Praskovia Kovalyova-Zhemchugova =

Russian opera singer (1768 –1803)

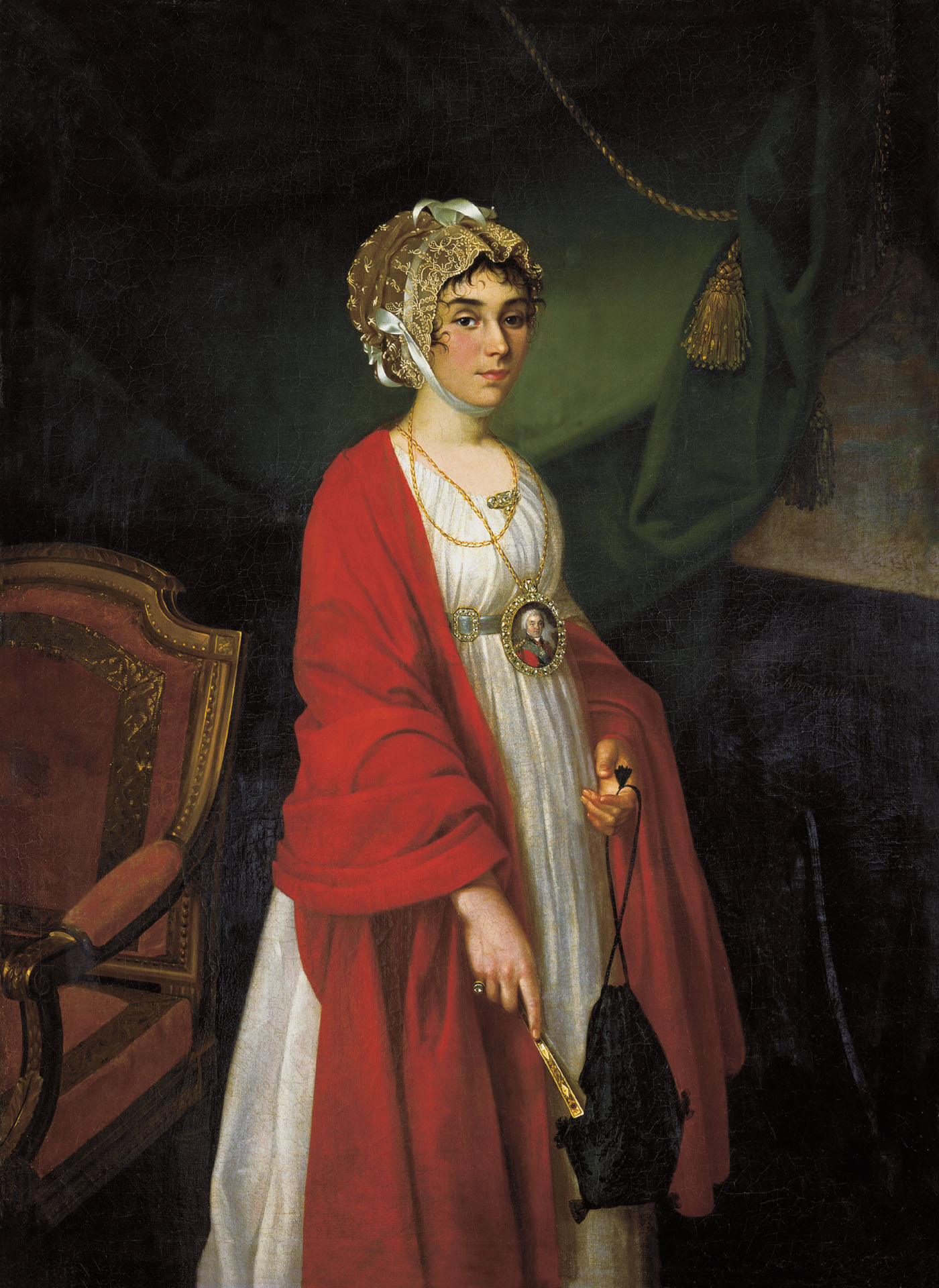
Nikolai Argunov (1771 – c. 1829): the portrait of Praskovya Ivanovna Zhemchugova-Sheremeteva, 1803. The pendant of her necklace shows a miniature portrait of her husband Nikolai Sheremetev

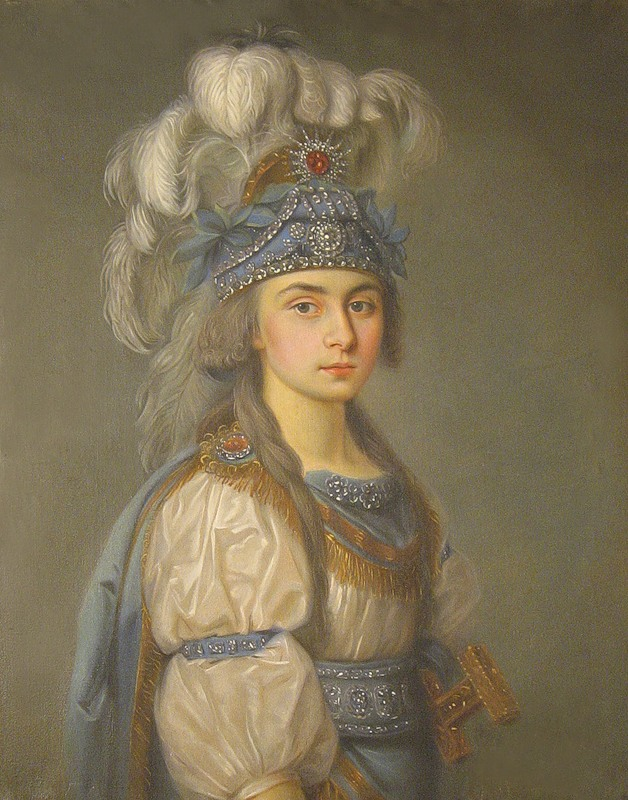
Praskovia Kovalyova-Zhemchugova in a scenic costume for Les mariages samnites by André Ernest Modeste Grétry

Praskovia Ivanovna Kovalyova-Zhemchugova (Russian: Прасковья Ивановна Ковалёва-Жемчугова; (Note: Also Kovaleva or Kovalyova, Kovaleva-Zhemchugova, Zhemchugova-Sheremeteva, and Sheremeteva or Sheremetyeva) 31 July [O.S. 20 July] 1768 – 7 March [O.S. 23 February] 1803) was a Russian serf actress and soprano opera singer.

== Career ==
Praskovia was one of the best opera singers in eighteenth-century Russia. and Figes describes her as Russia's first "superstar". She was born into the family of a serf blacksmith by the name of Ivan Gorbunov (a.k.a. Kovalyov) probably on the estate of Voshchazhnikovo in the province of Yaroslavl. Praskovia and her family belonged to the Sheremetevs, one of the richest noble families in Russia at the time, along with an estimated one million other serfs. As a young girl she moved with her family to the estate of Kuskovo outside Moscow. Soon thereafter she was taken from her family to serve as a chambermaid to Princess Martha Dolgorukaya, a relative of her master, Count Pyotr Sheremetev, who lived in the manor house.

When it was discovered that she had a fine voice, Praskovia, like other serfs who became artists, was trained to be a singer in the opera company then being put together by Count Pyotr and his son, Nikolai Sheremetev. She debuted in 1779 on the stage of the serf theatre at Kuskovo in the role of the servant Gubert in the comic opera L'Amitié à l'épreuve by André Grétry. Following her success, Praskovia was given the leading role of Belinda in Antonio Sacchini's opera La colonie. In this 1780 performance the actress for the first time appeared under the stage name Zhemchugova, "The Pearl", (zhemchug means "pearl" in Russian). The other stars of the company were also given new names: Arina "The Sapphire", Fekla "The Turquoise", Tatyana "The Garnet", Nikolai "The Marble", Andrei "The Flint", etc.

After the role of Belinda, Praskovia was promoted to the position of the first actress of the theatre. By the age of 17, she could read and write French] and Italian fluently, played the harp and clavichord, and was acknowledged by her contemporaries for her operatic and dramatic abilities.

In a career that spanned almost two decades, Praskovia performed in over a dozen operas, including Monsigny's Le déserteur and Aline, reine de Golconde, Paisiello's L'infante de Zamora, Jean-Jacques Rousseau's Le Devin du village, and Piccinni's La buona figliuola maritata.

Her most important role was Eliane in Grétry's opera Les Mariages samnites. Assuming the part for the first time in 1785, Praskovia sang Eliane for 12 years — a first in the history of serf theatre. In 1787 Praskovia sang the role of Eliane at Kuskovo for Empress Catherine II and her suite. Catherine was so impressed by her performance that she requested to meet Praskovia and later gave her a diamond ring.

In the mid-1780s or early 1790s, Praskovya became the mistress of Count Nikolai Sheremetev. Nikolai was the impresario of the family serf theater, and he had helped train Praskovia over the years, eventually falling seriously in love with the young star of the troupe. The circumstances surrounding the early years of their relationship, like so much of Praskovia's life, are unknown. After the death of Nikolai's father in 1788, Nikolai and Praskovia set up a private household in a secluded corner of the Kuskovo estate. Their unorthodox relationship soon became the subject of gossip among aristocratic society, and Praskovia was resented by the other serfs.

In 1795 Praskovia, Nikolai, and the theatre troupe moved from Kuskovo to Ostankino, a brilliant new palace constructed north of Moscow with a large theatre intended for large-scale operas and immense balls. The year 1795 was marked by the premiere of the opera Zelmira and Smeloy, or the Capture of Izmail (Osip Kozlovsky, libretto by Pavel Potemkin); Praskovia acted in the role of the captive Turkish woman Zelmira). Praskovia performed here for Stanisław August Poniatowski, the last king of Poland.

== Later life ==
At the height of the theatre's flowering in the late 1790s Praskovia became ill, possibly with tuberculosis, and was forced to retire. In late 1796, Nikolai was appointed to the court of Paul I and Praskovia moved with him to Saint Petersburg.

Although they lived as husband and wife, and most people knew of this, Nikolai and Praskovia could not live their relationship openly. It was taboo for an aristocrat like Sheremetev to move about in society with a serf as his social equal, and marriage, especially for a man from the highest noble family, was theoretically out of the question. Finally, in 1798 Sheremetev emancipated Praskova and later the entire Kovalyov family from serfdom. Understanding that her health would not allow her to return to the stage, he closed the theatre.

In 1801 Nikolai and Praskovia married in Moscow in the strictest secrecy. As part of the arrangements, Nikolai had created a phony genealogy for Praskovia claiming that she was the long-lost descendant of a Polish nobleman by the name of Kovalevsky. Around the time of the wedding he sent a forger to Poland with a purse full of money to purchase a patent of nobility from a willing noble family.

Within months of their wedding Praskovia became pregnant. On February 3, 1803, she gave birth to a son, Dmitry. However, the burden of her illness along with pregnancy and childbirth was too much for her system and she died on February 23, at the Sheremetev palace in Saint Petersburg. Just before she died Nikolai informed Emperor Alexander I of his marriage and requested official recognition, which Alexander granted. News of the marriage scandalized society and angered Nikolai's family. Nikolai's two nephews, the Razumovsky brothers, had planned to inherit their uncle's vast fortune, and upon hearing that they were to lose it all to the son of a serf they contemplated murdering the infant.

Praskovia was buried in an elaborate ceremony at the Alexander Nevsky Monastery attended by clergy and servants from the Sheremetev household. Nikolai was too overcome with grief to attend, and the nobility stayed away to signal their disapproval of Nikolai's marriage.

Nikolai was overwhelmed with grief. Ultimately, the only comfort he found was in fulfilling her final wish that he contribute to caring for the poor and the sick. In memory of Praskovia, Nikolai built in Moscow on Sukharevskaya square, a large almshouse that tended to the sick, poor, and orphaned up until the revolution of 1917. Under the Soviets the almshouse was shut down and replaced by the Sklifosovsky Institute, a scientific research institute named after N. Sklifosovsky.

== Quotations ==
The love affair between Count Sheremetyev and his serf actress set the rumour mill rolling with the high society really shocked to see the count to be so madly in love with his servant and even preparing to build a theatre for her in his Ostankino estate just north of Moscow. And still, this public criticism of his choice was really playing on the young count's nerves who realised all too clear that the society would never forgive him if he ever married the commoner girl. In the meantime, Praskovya the actress was making strides on stage and her theatre's fortnightly performances always played to a full house." (Lyubov Tsarevskaya, Russian Culture).

The plaque on Praskovia's grave reads--

This plain marble, unfeeling and impermanent,

Hides the priceless remains of a wife and mother.
Her soul was a temple of virtue,
In which peace, piety, and faith resided,
Where pure love and friendship dwellt.
Even in her final hour she remained devoted,
Feeling the full grief of those she was leaving behind.
What is to become of her wretched spouse,
Fated to drag out the rest of his days without his friend?
His heart lives on nothing but barren sighs, wailing, sorrow, and heavy moans.
Yet her death was the path to immortality,
Her innocent spirit is now in God's embrace,
Robed in the radiant cloak of imperishability,
And forever surrounded by the faces of angels.
Fill this dwelling place with righteous blessings,

O God, and lay her pure soul to rest for all eternity.

== Sources ==
- "Кузнецова-Горбунова, Прасковья Ивановна" . Brockhaus and Efron Encyclopedic Dictionary (in Russian). 1906.
