= Ostankino Palace =

Palace in Russia

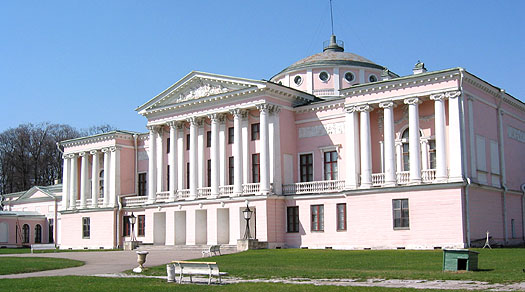
- Main hall in 2006
- Interactive map of the Ostankino Palace area

General information
- Architectural style: Neoclassicism
- Location: Moscow, Russia
- Coordinates: 55°49′29″N 37°36′52″E
- Construction started: 1790
- Completed: 1798
- Client: Nikolai Sheremetev

Technical details
- Structural system: Wooden frame

Design and construction
- Architect: see Attribution dispute section

Ostankino Palace is a former summer residence and private opera theatre of the Sheremetev family, originally situated several kilometres to the north of central Moscow. It is a part of the North-Eastern Administrative Okrug of the city. Extant historical grounds include the main wooden palace, built in 1792–1798 around a theatre hall, with adjacent Egyptian and Italian pavilions, a 17th-century Trinity church, and fragments of the old Ostankino park with a replica of Milovzor folly.

== History ==
=== 16th century to 1787 ===
The first documentary evidence of Ostankino—then known as Ostashkovo—dates to the middle of the 16th century, when Tsar Ivan IV of Russia granted these lands to the hold of Alexey Satin, relative of statesman Alexey Adashev. Satin, however, was executed by Ivan in 1560, and the lands passed to one Horn, a German mercenary, and, in 1585, to diak (statesman) Vasily Schelkalov. Under Schelkalov, the unpopulated lands of Ostashkovo developed into a manor estate with ponds and cedar park.

This manor was destroyed by plunder and fire in the Time of Troubles. The end of hostilities and ascension of the House of Romanov brought the new owners: the princes Tcherkassky. They replanted the parks and established a hunting reserve, expanding east to Alekseyevskoye village.

In the first half of the 18th century Ostankino was gradually converted from a permanent country manor to a temporary retreat; empress Elizabeth of Russia paid a visit to Ostankino in 1742. The following year, through a marriage between princess Varvara, the sole heir of Tcherkassky fortunes, and Peter Sheremetev, son of field marshal Sheremetev, Ostankino passed to the Sheremetevs and remained their property until 1917.

=== Construction of the palace ===
In 1787 Nikolai Sheremetev inherited Ostankino upon the death of his father. Nikolai Sheremetev was a patron of theater. In the three following years Sheremetev established house theaters in Kuskovo, Kitai-gorod and Markovo. In 1790 he held an architectural contest for a Palace of Arts in Moscow, but eventually preferred to build it in the country, far from city life. Building a new large theater in Kuskovo would have ruined an already completed ensemble, so in the same 1790 Sheremetev finally chose Ostankino.

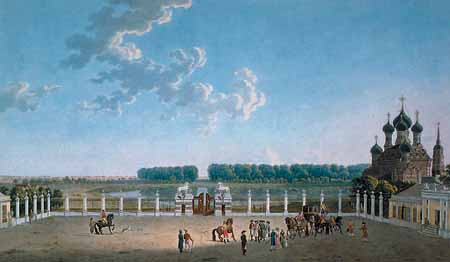
View south from the windows of the Ostankino Palace in the early 18th century

Sheremetev initially hired someone Casier (Russian: Казье), a self-proclaimed architect employed by Golitsyn family. This project did not materialize; by 1792, Sheremetev built only a two-story wooden theater hall, apparently discarding Casier's plans. Then, as Sheremetev recruited services of influential contemporary architects (most notably Francesco Camporesi, see Attribution dispute section), work accelerated and the wooden palace was structurally in its present shape, including pavilion wings, by the end of 1793. Contemporary witnesses reported that Sheremetev was so confident in perfection of his palace that he set up an unprecedented veil of secrecy around construction site: the manor was closed to any visitors, covered with shrouds, architects worked in parallel unaware of each other's progress.

Interior works took another six years. Major work on the palace was completed by the end of 1798, while lesser decoration and landscaping projects continued until the end of Sheremetev's life.

=== Park ===
In 1761 Sheremetevs hired a garden manager, Johann Manstadt, who supervised expansion of the park and its conversion to a commercial enterprise.

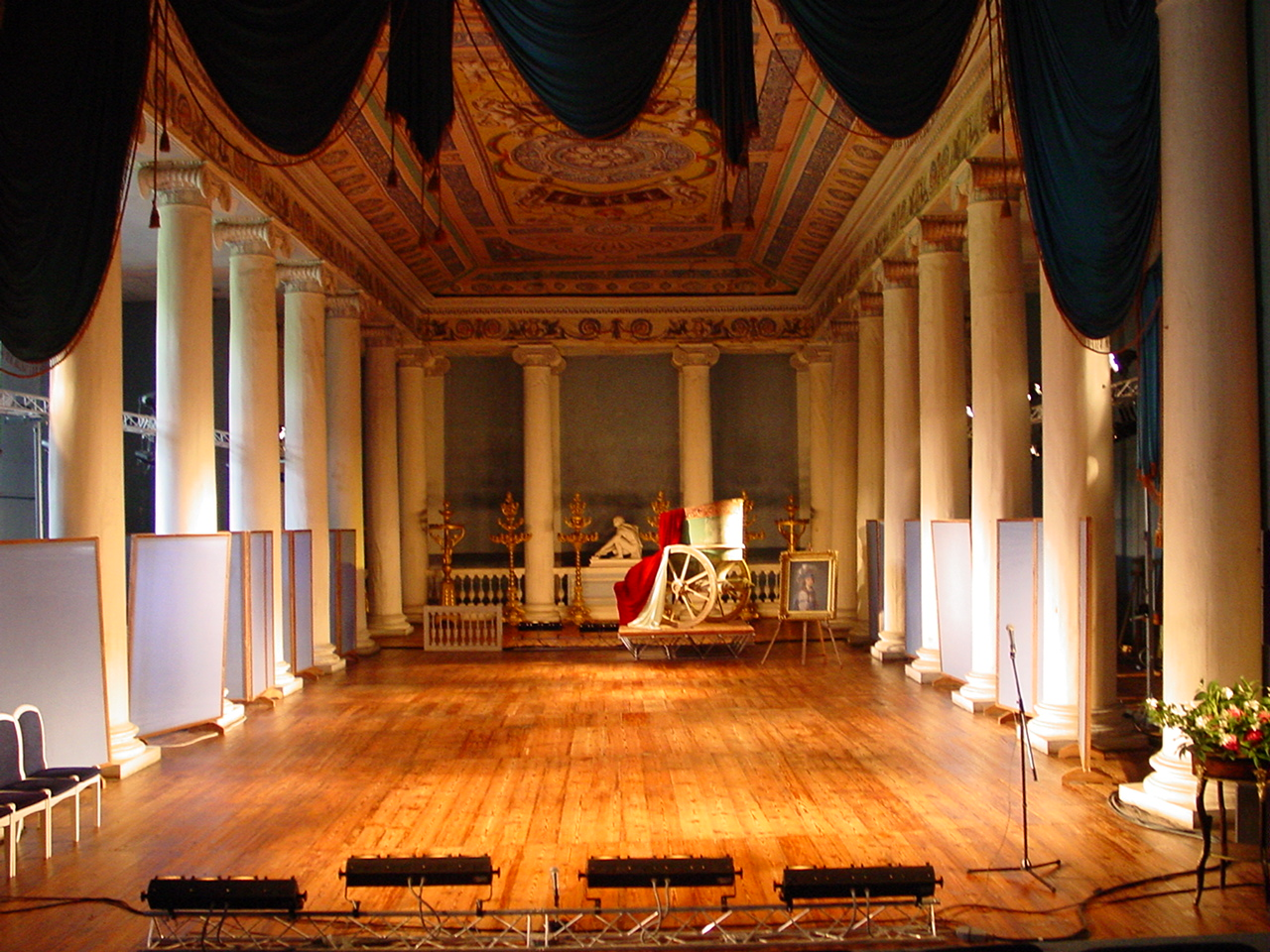
The Ostankino Ballroom Theatre still operates some of the original machinery.

Nikolai Sheremetev initially assigned landscaping to his serf architect, Mironov, but soon deemed Mironov's plan inappropriate. The job passed to Pyotr Argunov, with consultancy by Francis Reid, manager of Tsaritsyno Park project. Reid and his associate, Nikolai Kuverin, worked in Ostankino in 1791–1794. A permanent garden manager, Robert Manners, was hired in 1796 and stayed in Ostankino for thirty years. Reid's input apparently concentrated on the immediate vicinity of the palace; regular English garden north from the palace was planted in 1797 by Manners.

=== Two seasons of the theater ===
The theater opened in summer of 1795. Paul I, who ascended to the throne in November 1796, summoned Nikolai Sheremetev to Saint Petersburg. The theater operated publicly for just one season in spring 1797, with one show for emperor Paul and one for Stanisław Poniatowski, former king of partitioned Poland. In 1800 Sheremetev reduced the artistic company—barely sufficient for the private entertainment.

The 1802 death of Sheremetev's wife, former actress Praskovya Kovaleva-Zhemchugova, spelled the end of the theater. Nikolai Sheremetev disbanded his theater company and abstained from public entertainment till the end of his life (1809). There were accounts of an 1801 show for Alexander I; however, modern scholars deem these reports incorrect: the show was planned but did not materialize.

=== 19th to 21st centuries ===
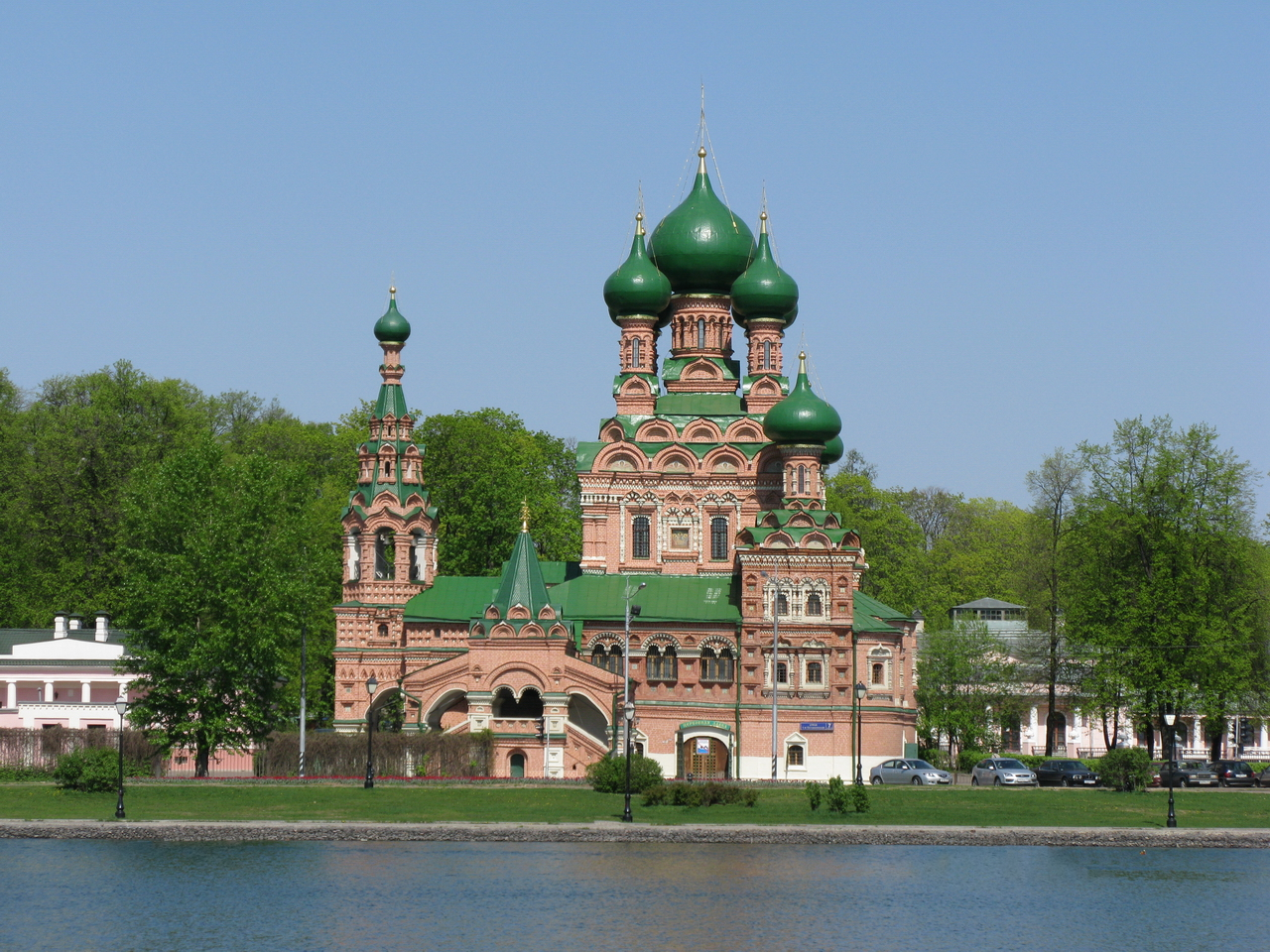
The manorial church was consecrated in 1683

Sheremetev's heirs barely maintained the palace; in the 1830s they demolished the old living quarters dating back to the 17th century, and demolished some of the free-standing service buildings.

Ostankino Park fell in neglect in the 1830s. In the second part of the 19th century parts of the park were sold to dacha developers and leased to farmers, while the greenhouses concentrated on commercial flower growing.

In the Soviet period the nationalized palace operated as a museum of serf art. In 1935 the eastern part of former Ostankino park grounds were allotted to the emerging Agricultural Exhibition and remodelled by 1939. Ostankino park proper shrunk to just one square kilometer as the lands further north became the State Botanical Garden.

Throughout the Soviet period the main theater hall was set up a single ballroom space. Partitions separating stage, orchestra pit and spectator areas were re-introduced during the controversial repairs of the 2000s, so the theater can once again be used in its original function.

== Attribution dispute ==
Nikolai Sheremetev managed construction himself, hiring architects at will; in addition to original architectural work, he reused drafts of Saint Petersburg architects. Contemporary academic studies agree on the fact that, while certain parts and details of the palace can be attributed to specific architects (with different degree of probability), the palace as a whole—even its basic layout—has no single author apart from Sheremetev himself.

Igor Grabar attributed design of the palace to Vasily Bazhenov; this viewpoint is discarded by modern studies as unsubstantiated.

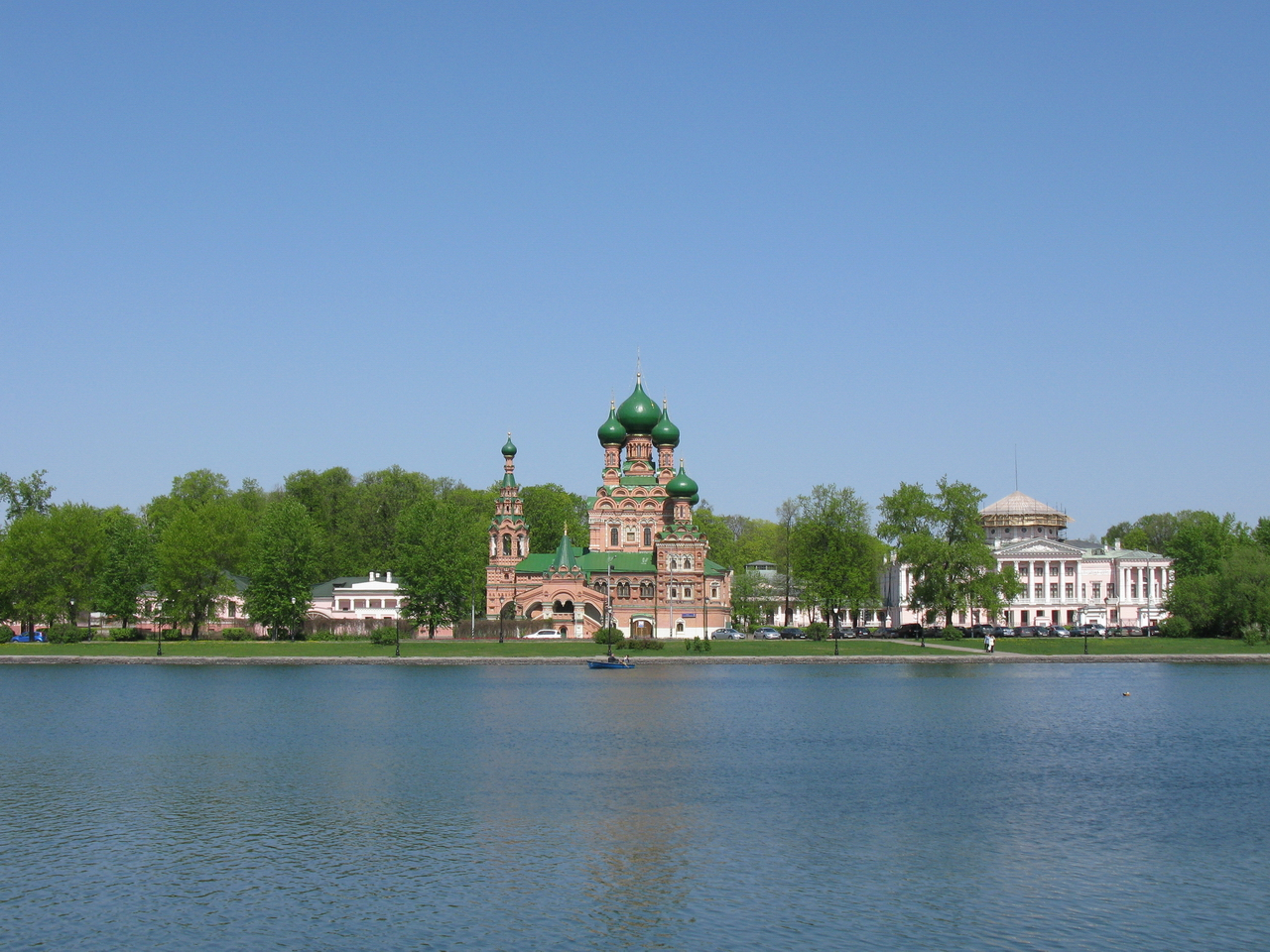
View from across the pond

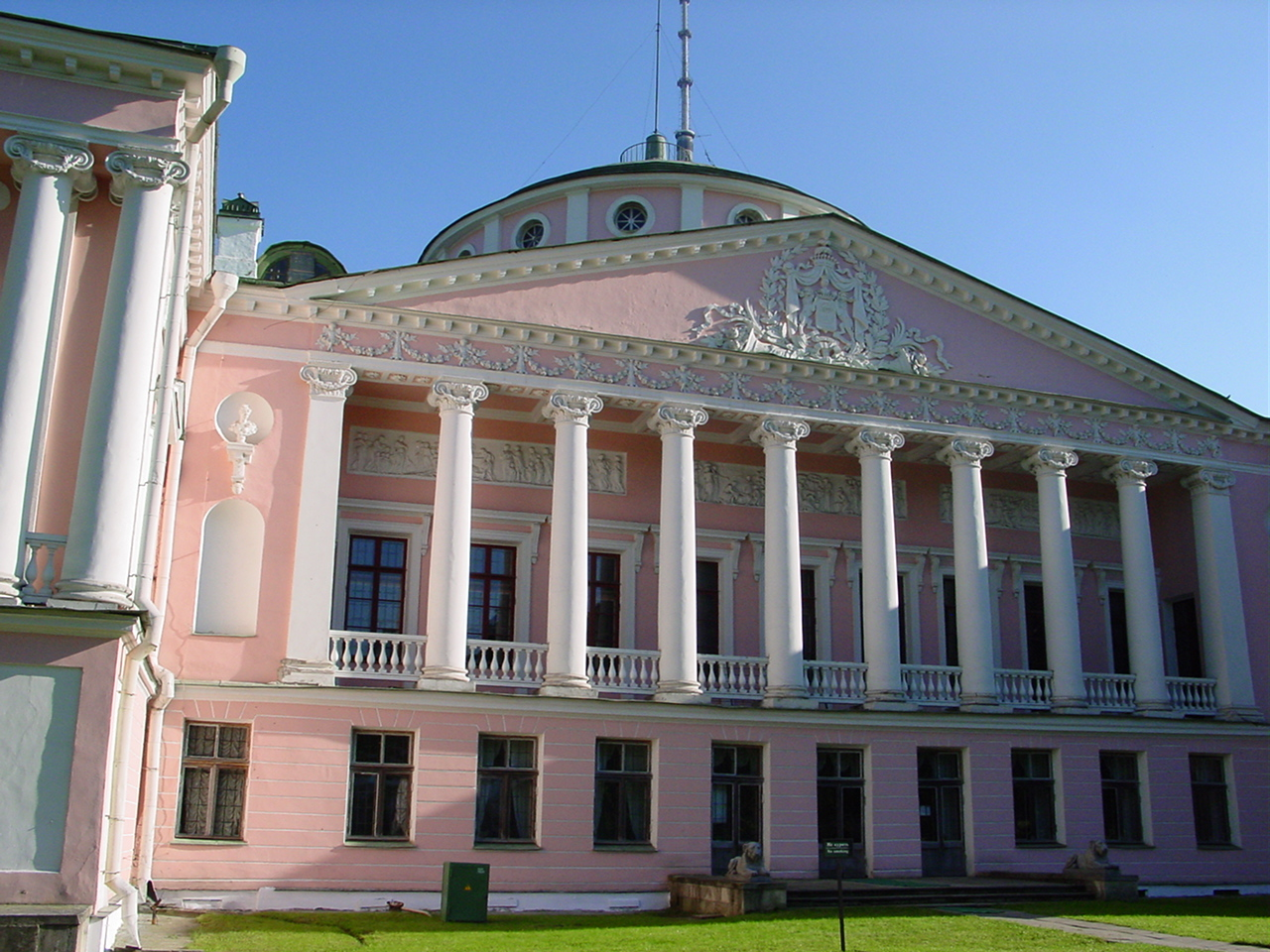
The pediment still bears the Sheremetev arms

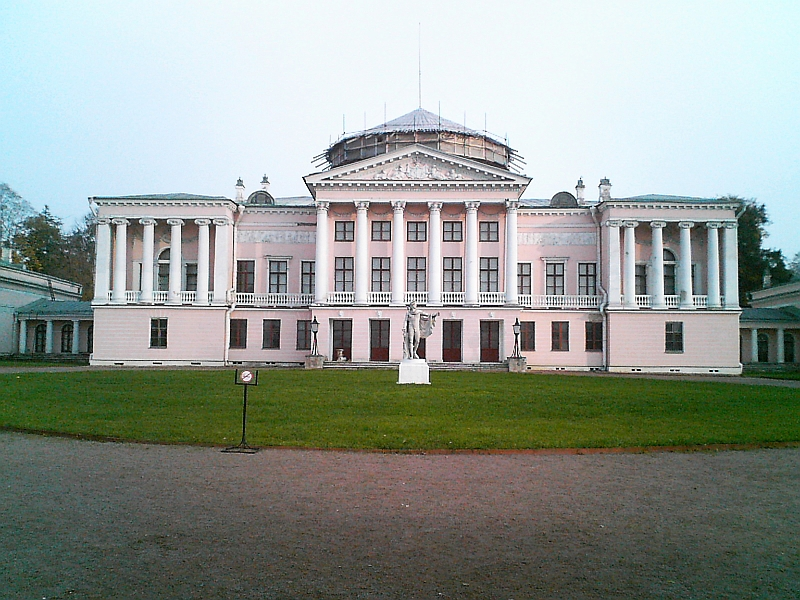
A statue of Apollo in front of the palace

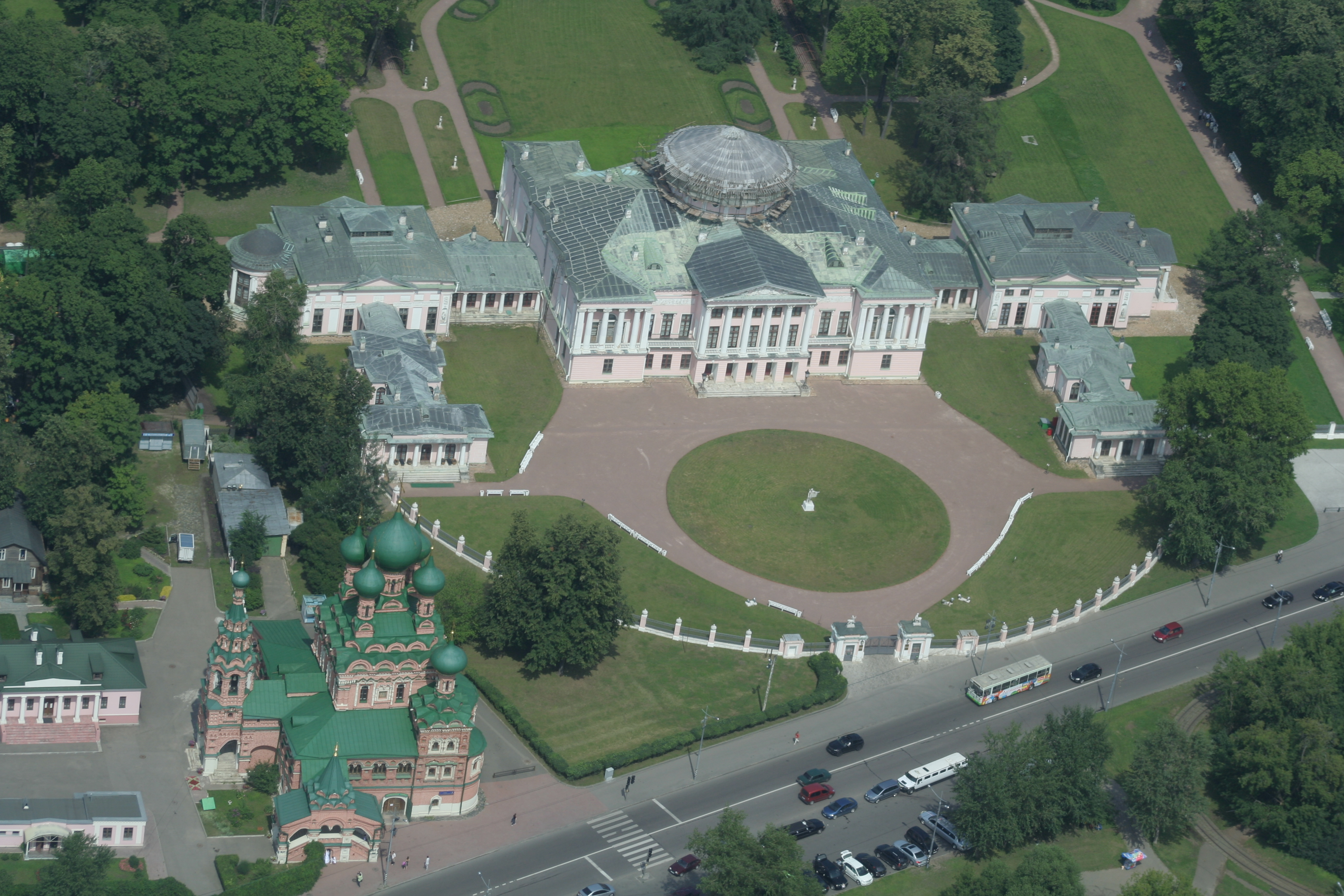
The estate as seen from the Ostankino Tower

== See also ==
- Kuskovo
- Arkhangelskoye Estate
- Tōdai-ji, largest wooden building in the world
- New Zealand Parliament Buildings, Old Government Buildings (Wellington) - second-largest wooden building in the world
