= Aleksandr Sheremetev =

Russian composer

Count Aleksandr Sheremetev
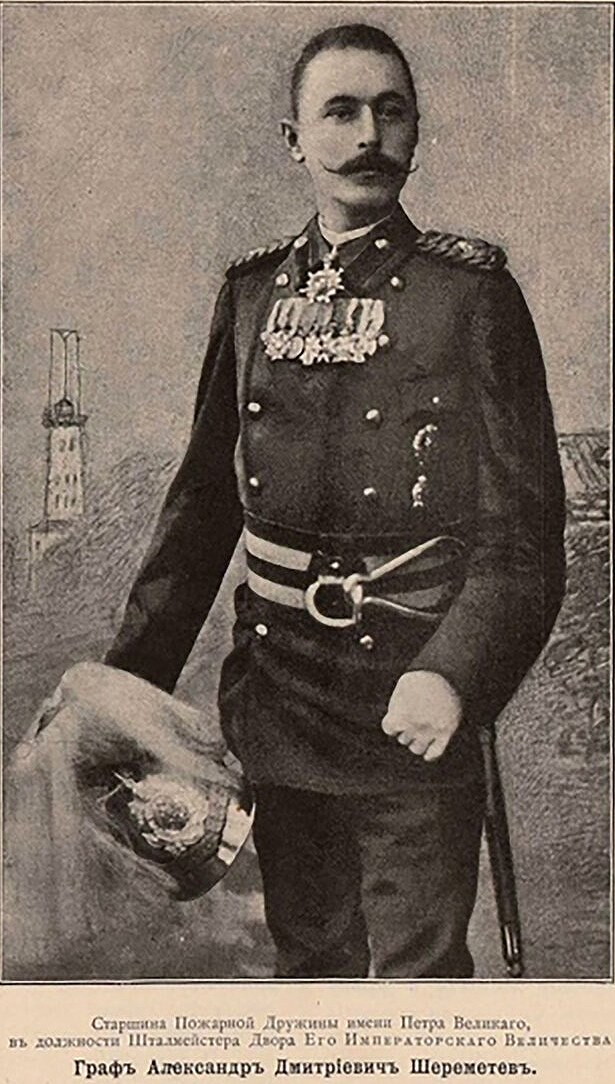
- Aleksandr Sheremetev in the uniform of a fire brigade, c. 1903
- Born: Aleksandr Dmitriyevich Sheremetev; 11 March 1859; Russian Empire
- Died: 18 May 1931 (aged 72); Paris, French Third Republic
- Occupations: composer, conductor, entrepreneur
- Known for: fled Russia to escape Red Terror (1917)
- Notable work: Russian premiere of Richard Wagner's Parsifal (1906)
- Spouse: Marie Heyden (m.1883, d.1931)

Count Aleksandr Dmitriyevich Sheremetev (11 March [O.S. 27 February] 1859 – 18 May 1931) was a Russian composer, conductor and entrepreneur. He founded his own private symphony orchestra in 1882, and from 1898 organized public concerts in Saint Petersburg that involved the orchestra and a choir he had inherited from his father, Dmitri Sheremetev. He also founded the Musical Historical Society in 1910, which gave free lecture recitals involving his orchestra and choir.

Sheremetev conducted the Russian premiere of Richard Wagner's Parsifal in a series of three concerts in 1906; his conducting on that occasion was described by the press as "primitive". This was followed by Sheremetev conducting the opera's first Russian staging on 21 December 1913 (according to the Russian Old Style calendar; 3 January 1914 according to the standard Western calendar), performed at the Hermitage Theatre before the Imperial Family, the diplomatic corps, representative members of the State Duma and senior government officials. After two further performances there, the production transferred to the Theatre of Musical Drama.

On 10 June 1883 Sheremetev married Marie Heyden (born 1863 in Reval), daughter of Governor-General of Finland count Frederick Heyden (1821–1900) and Elisabeth Zubov (1833–1894).

In 1917, Count Aleksandr and his wife fled to their estates in Finland and escaped the Red Terror. They lost all their possessions in Russia, sold their Finnish estates and moved to Belgium and then to Paris. After a while the money ran out and they lived in poverty, but helped somewhat by a charity. They both died in Paris in 1931 and were buried in the Russian cemetery there.

Their son, Georgy, fought for the Whites, fled Russia and worked as secretary for Grand Duke Nikolai Nikolaevich of Russia in France in the 1920s.
