= Nikolai Sheremetev =

Russian count

The coat of arms of Count Sheremetev
- Crest: Issuant from the coronet of rank an oak tree proper between two mullets of six points argent.
- Shield: Or in chief on a torteau surrounded by a wreath of laurel a royal crown and two crosses pattée argent in pale and in base between a boyar's hat fesswise and a crescent charged with a representation of a man's face argent a sword and spear crossed in saltire proper, the whole ensigned by the coronet of a Count of the Russian Empire.
- Supporters: Two lions salient guardant Or the dexter one holding in his interior paw a sceptre and in his mouth a laurel branch proper the sinister one holding in his interior paw a globus cruciger and in his mouth an olive branch proper upon a grassy compartment proper
- Motto: Deus conservat omnia, Latin for "God preserves all".
- Other elements: The mantling, or doubled gules.

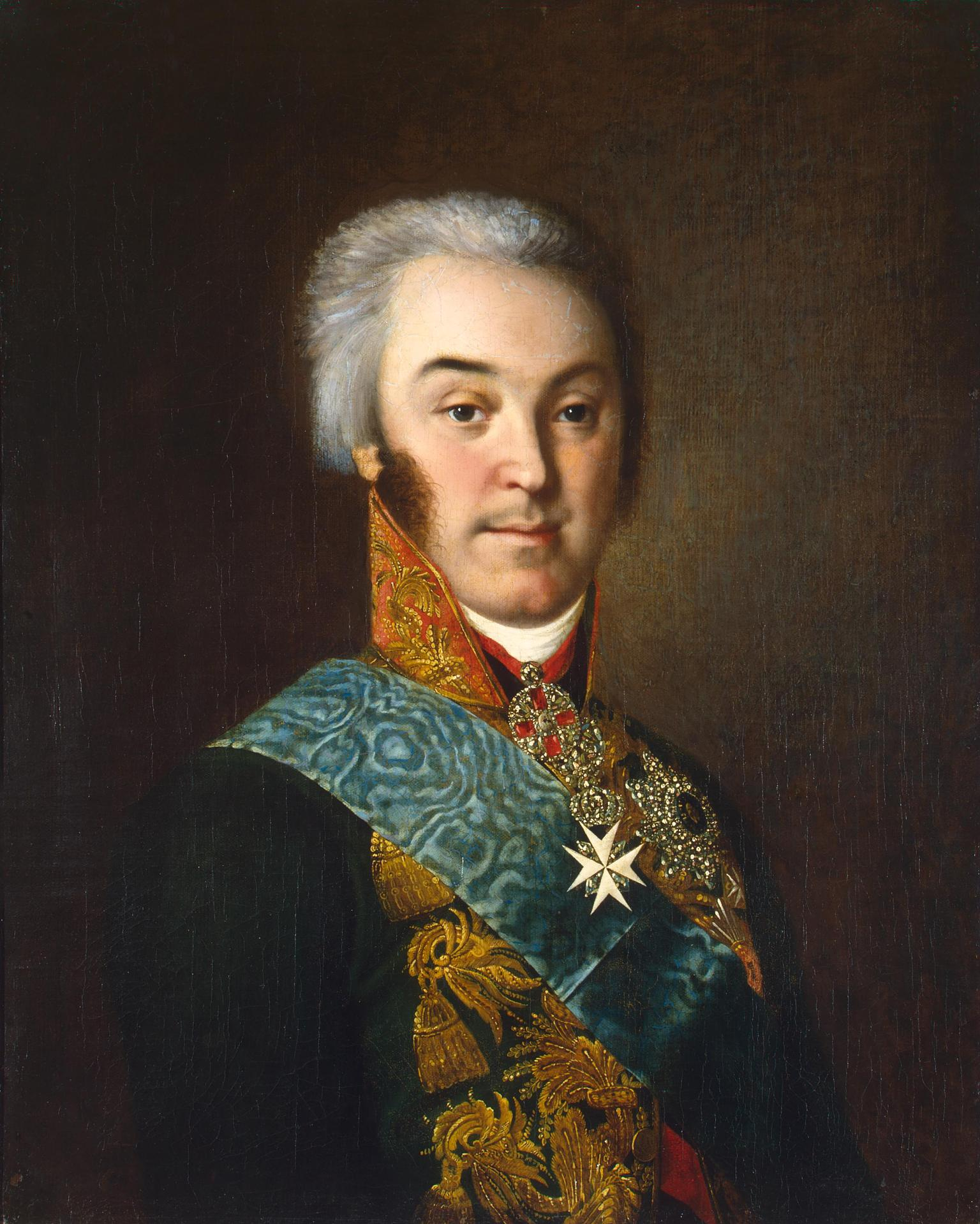
Portrait

Nikolai Petrovich Sheremetev (Russian: Никола́й Петро́вич Шереметев) (28 June 1751 - 2 January 1809 O.S., 9 July 1751 - 14 January 1809 N.S.) was a Russian count, the son of Petr Borisovich Sheremetev, notable grandee of the epoch of empresses Anna Ivanovna, Elizabeth Petrovna, and Catherine II. He was also the grandson of Boris Petrovich Sheremetev.

His father P. B. Sheremetev was passionate about the theatre and transferred this passion to his son. N. P. Sheremetev spent his early youth at court. From the age of 13 to 14 he started to act in private theatricals of his father, and then "on the big court theatre". In 1765 he played the role of the god Hymen in the mythological ballet Acis and Galathea, in which his childhood comrade, the future Paul I, had distinguished himself.

Having a special passion for music, Nikolai Petrovich masterfully played the cello. From 1769 to 1773 he traveled abroad: he attended lectures in Leiden University in the Netherlands, traveled across England, Germany, and Switzerland, took music lessons, and got acquainted with theatre life. In France he took a great interest in opéra comique.

Returning to Moscow and receiving the post of director of the Moscow bank for noblemen, Sheremetev started to reconstruct his father's theatre: he engaged in special education of serf children, "certain to theatre" (Russian letters, foreign languages, music, singing, dance, diction, refined manners). Feeling extraordinary talent in one of his students, Parasha Kovaleva (Praskovya Ivanovna Kovaleva), he gave her more and more attention, preparing for her star career as the future "Praskovya Zhemchugova", whom he married in 1801.

Sheremetev's performances involved Moscow gentlefolk. From a small private theatre of the count P. B. Sheremetev, it grew into a troupe capable of giving "an opera and allegorical ballets". From the moment of his return from abroad Sheremetev not only watched closely all events of the Moscow theatre life, but on a regular basis he took out the troupe to performances of theatre Medox, and he invited lead actors of Peter theatre (theatre Medox) to teach serf actors. In the beginning of 1790 Sheremetev decided to transfer the serf theatre from Kuskovo to Ostankino. On July 22, 1795, the theatre was opened with the premiere of the heroic opera The Capture of Izmail (P. Potemkin's libretto, I. Kozlovski's music). Sheremetev's theatre left far behind numerous other serf troupes (the only exception was the theatre of the Count A. R. Vorontsov).

In 1796 Sheremetev was made a senator, and in March he moved to St. Petersburg to Catherine II's court. On November 6, 1796, Catherine died and the throne was inherited by Paul I who gave Sheremetev the title of marshal. Sheremetev's life proceeded in St.Petersburg, Pavlovsk, Gatchina; he was engaged in theatre much less. Because of the incurable illness of Zhemchugova, who was now his wife, the Count closed the theatre in Ostankino, and on November 6, 1801, he secretly married her, having first found in an archive the facts testifying to her "origin" from the Polish noble clan of Kovalev. The marriage was made public only after Zhemchugova's death (on February 23, 1803). Sheremetev sent a letter to the tsar, informing him about his marriage with a woman "whose origin incontestably had a noble beginning" and about the birth of his son and heir.

Sheremetev died six years later, in 1809. In his will he gave instructions for a very simple funeral, in a simple board coffin, with the money intended for a funeral distributed instead to the poor and monasteries.

== Ancestry ==
Ancestors of Prince Count Nikolai Petrovich Sheremetev

8. Pyotr Vasilievich Sheremetev
4. Count Boris Petrovich Sheremetev
9. Anna Fyodorovna Volynskaya
2. Count Pyotr Borisovich Sheremetev
10. Pyotr Petrovich Saltykov
5. Anna Petrovna Saltykova
11. Princess Marfa Ivanovna Prozorovskaya
Count Nikolai Petrovich Sheremetev
12. Prince Mikhail Yakovlevich Cherkassky
6. Prince Alexey Mikhailovich Cherkassky
13. Princess Marfa Nikitična Odoevskaya
3. Princess Varvara Alekseyevna Cherkasskaya
14. Prince Yuriy Yuryevich Trubeckoy
7. Princess Mariya Yuryevna Trubeckaya
15. Princess Elena Grigoryevna Cherkasskaya
