= Pyotr Sheremetev =

Russian nobleman

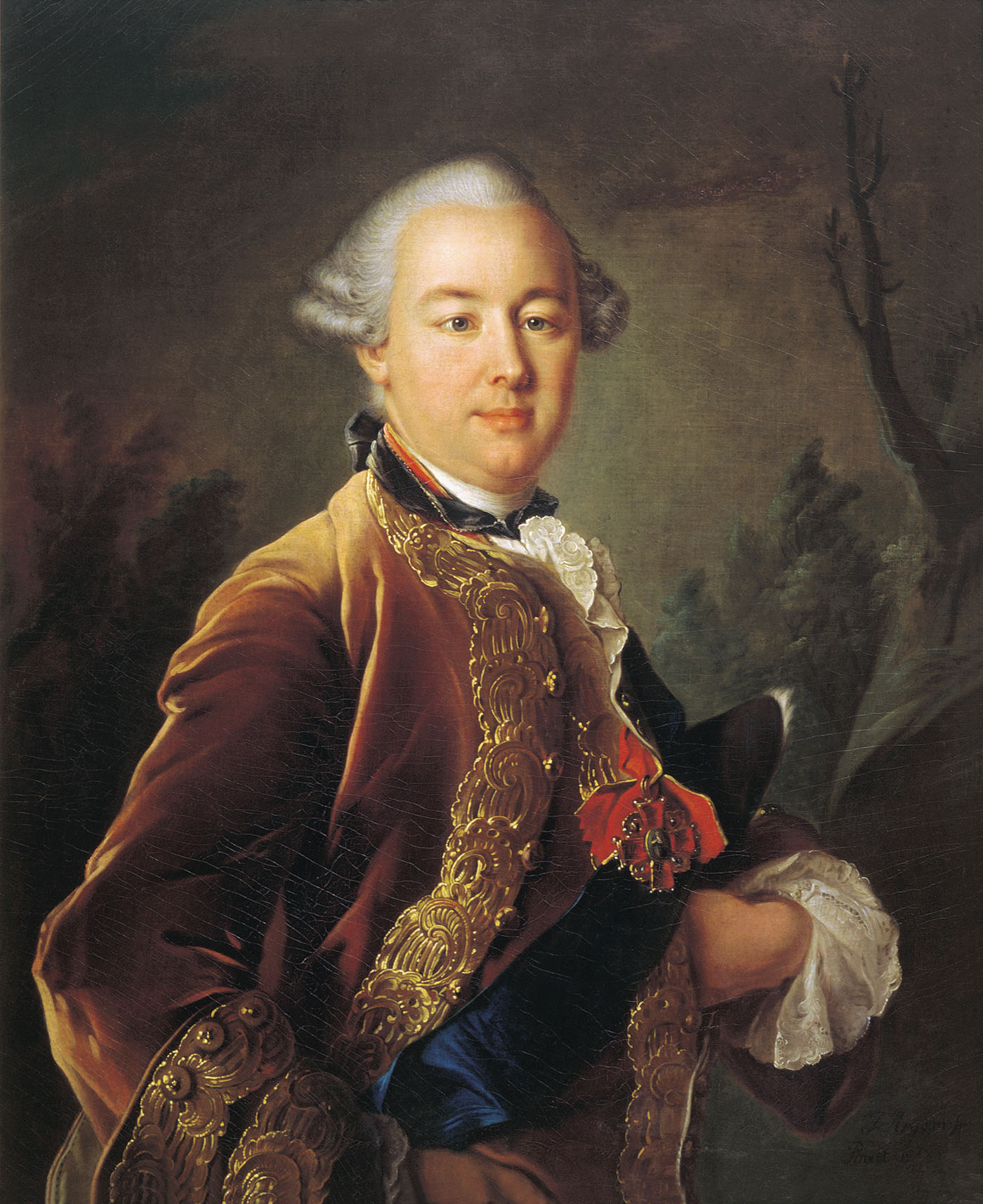

Pyotr Borisovich Sheremetev (Russian: Пётр Бори́сович Шереме́тев; 1713–1788) was a Russian nobleman and courtier, the richest man in Russia aside from the tsar; he was the son of Boris Sheremetev.

When his father Boris died in 1719, tsar Peter promised to be "like a father" to Boris's children, and young Pyotr was brought up at court as a companion to the heir to the throne, who became tsar Peter II.

After a teenage career in the Guards, Sheremetev became a chamberlain to the Empress Anna, and then to the Empress Elizabeth. Under Catherine the Great, he became a senator and was the first elected Marshal of the Nobility. Unlike other court favourites, who rose and fell with the change of sovereign, Sheremetev remained in office for six consecutive reigns. ... He was one of Russia's first noblemen to be independent in the European sense.

He was a lover of art and theater, using his vast wealth to remodel the Sheremetev Palace (known as the "Fountain House") on the Fontanka Embankment and the family estate at Kuskovo, where he collected a gallery of portraits, and to create a famous serf orchestra.

He married Varvara Alekseevna Cherkasskaya, daughter of Alexey Cherkkasky,an important court official, who brought him an expensive dowry. Their son was Nikolai Sheremetev.

== See also ==
- Natalia Sheremeteva – his sister
