= Kuskovo =

Summer country house and estate of the Sheremetev family in Moscow

Coordinates: 55°44′7″N 37°48′27″E

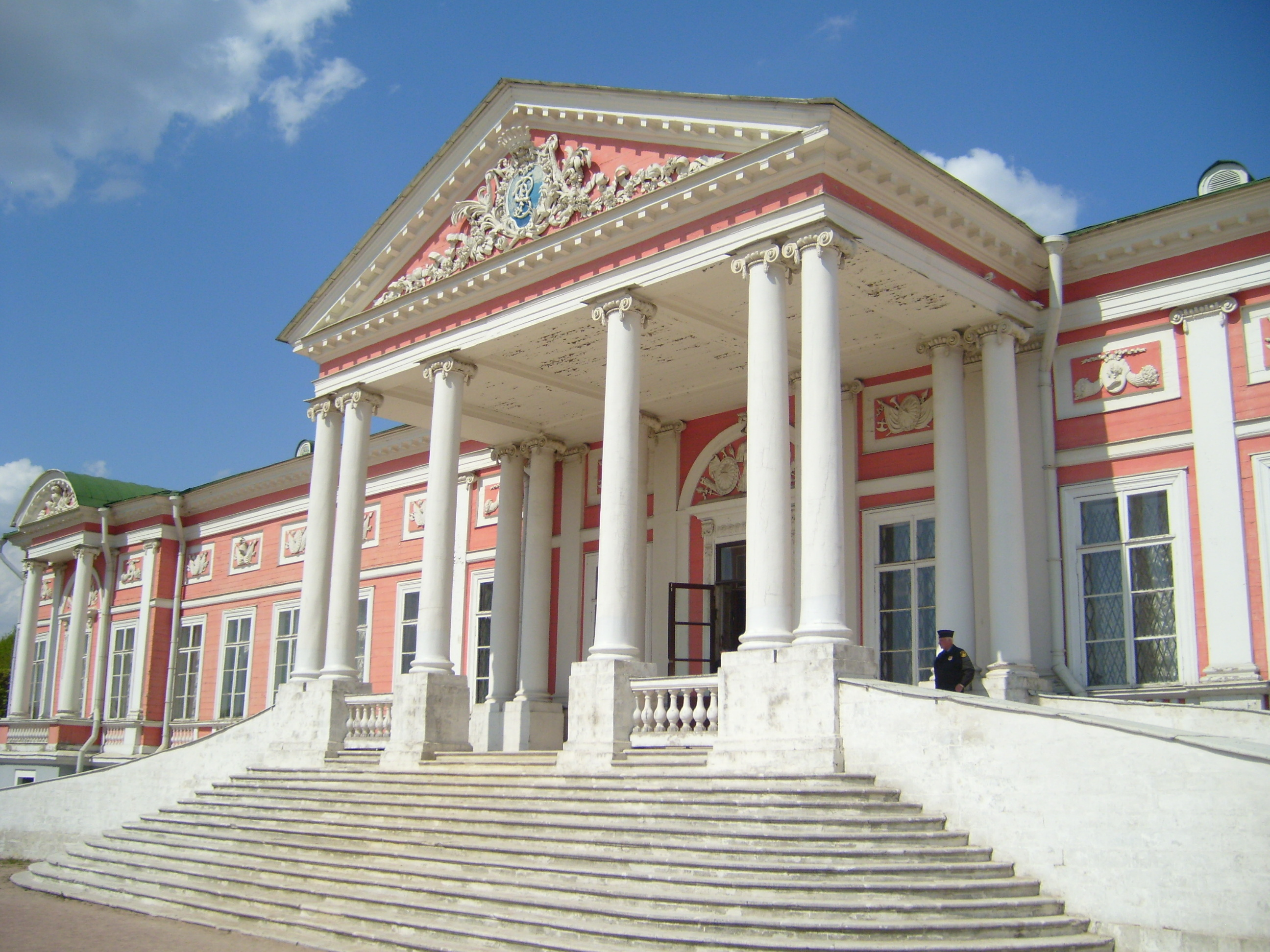
- Interactive map of the Kuskovo area

General information
- Architectural style: Neoclassical
- Location: Moscow, Russia
- Completed: 18th century
- Client: Pyotr Sheremetev

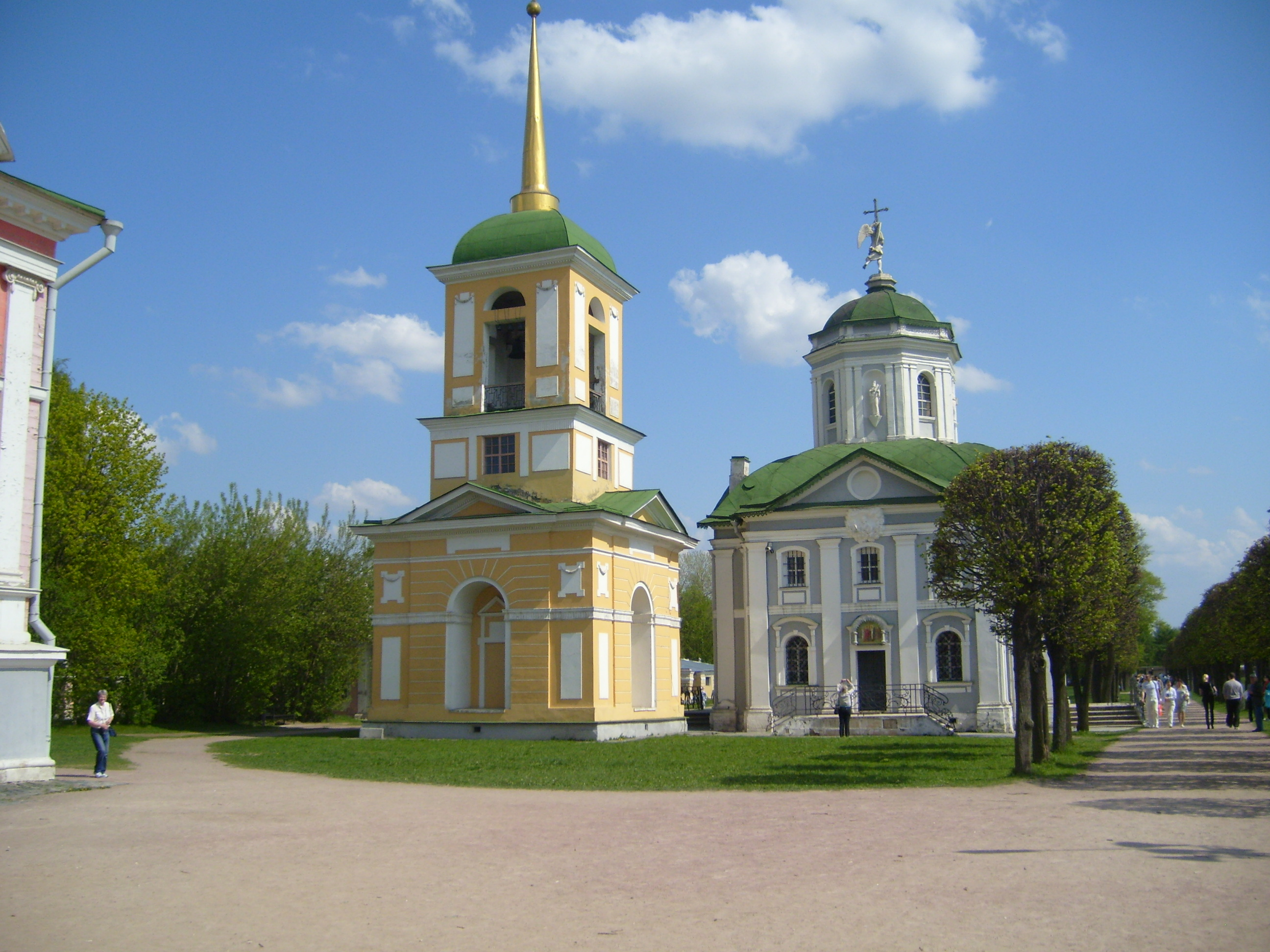
Kuskovo Church and Bell Tower

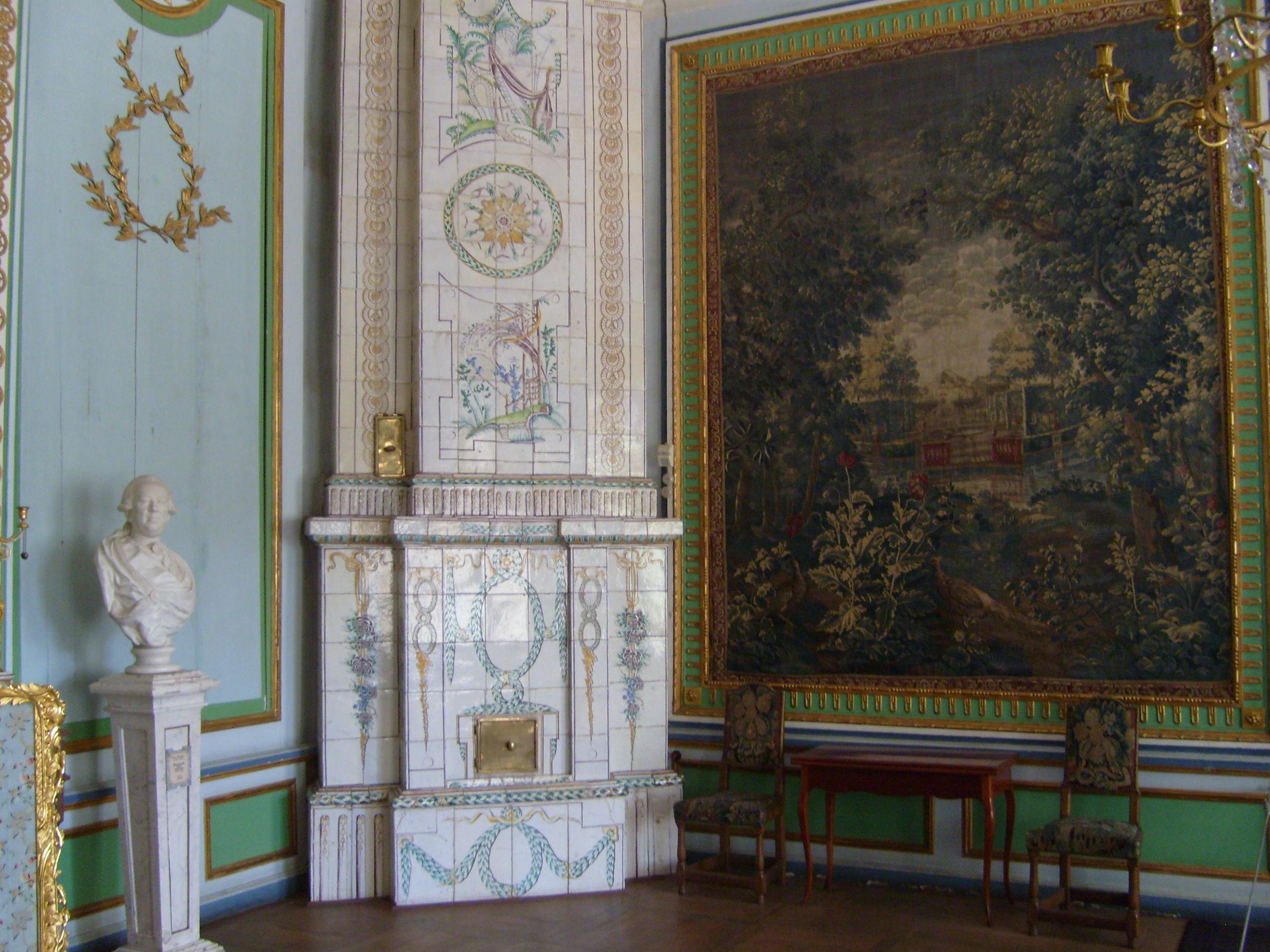
Tapestry Room of Kuskovo Palace

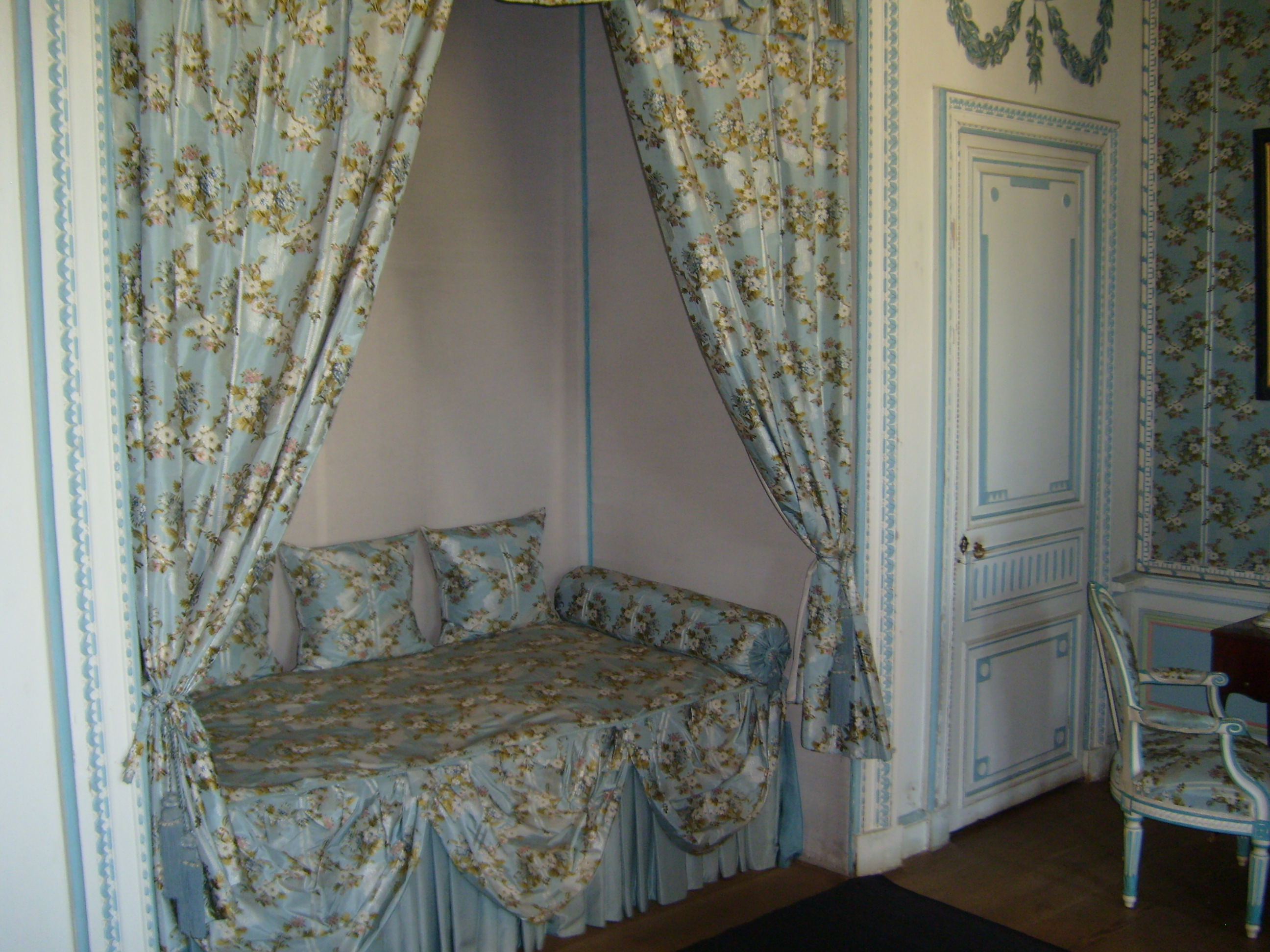
Everyday bedchamber of Kuskovo Palace

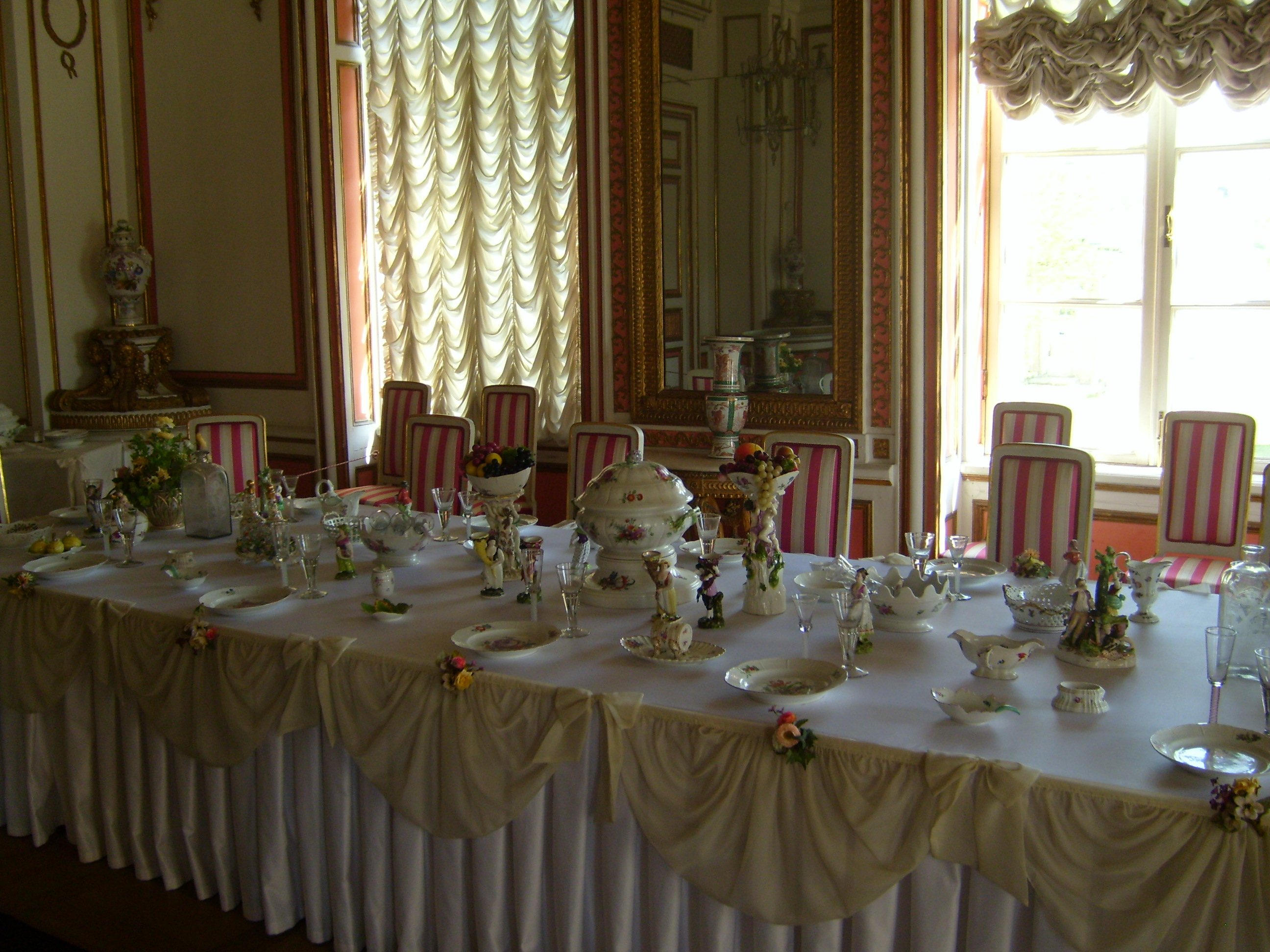
Dining Room of Kuskovo Palace

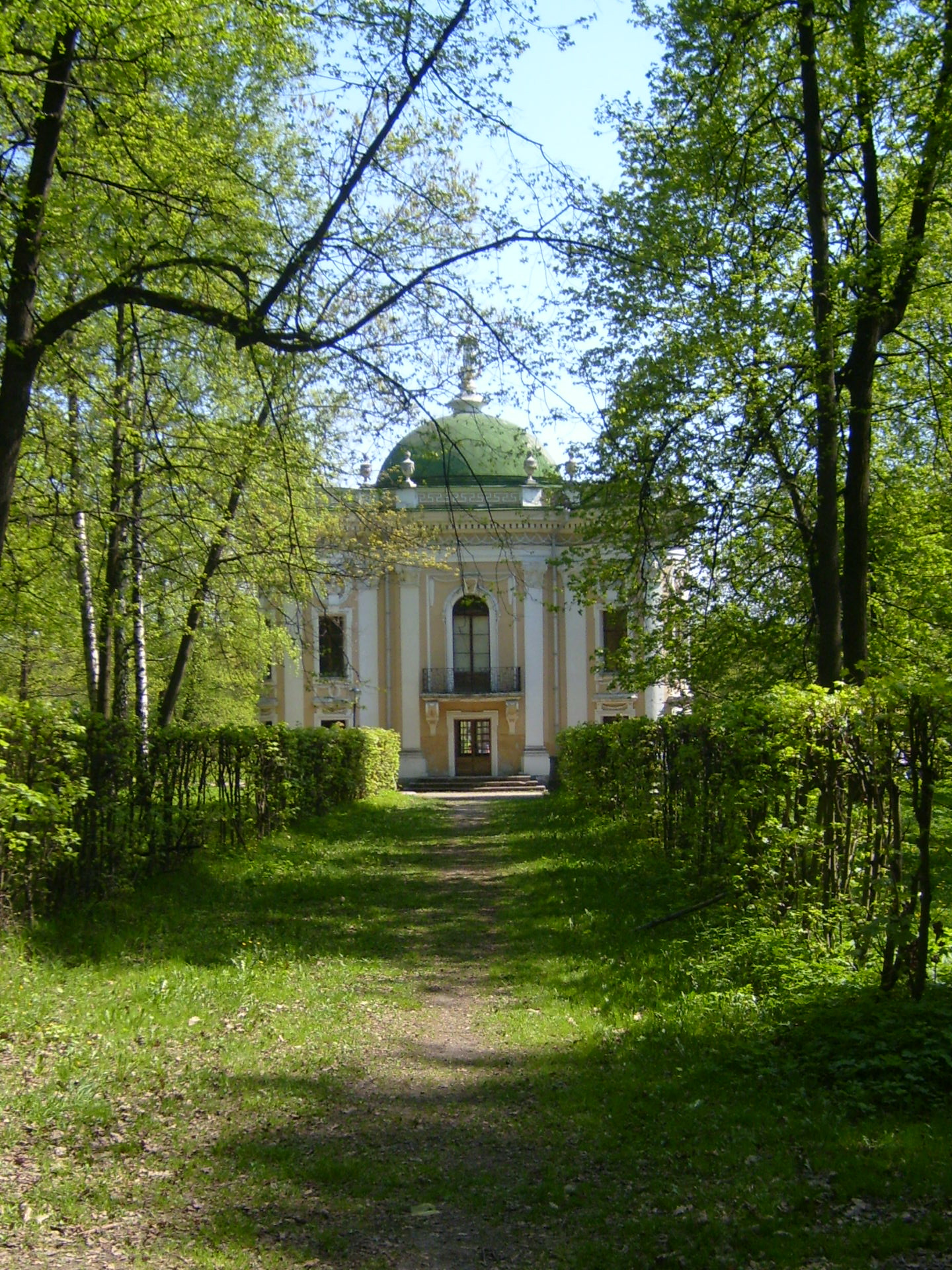
Hermitage in English landscape garden of Kuskovo

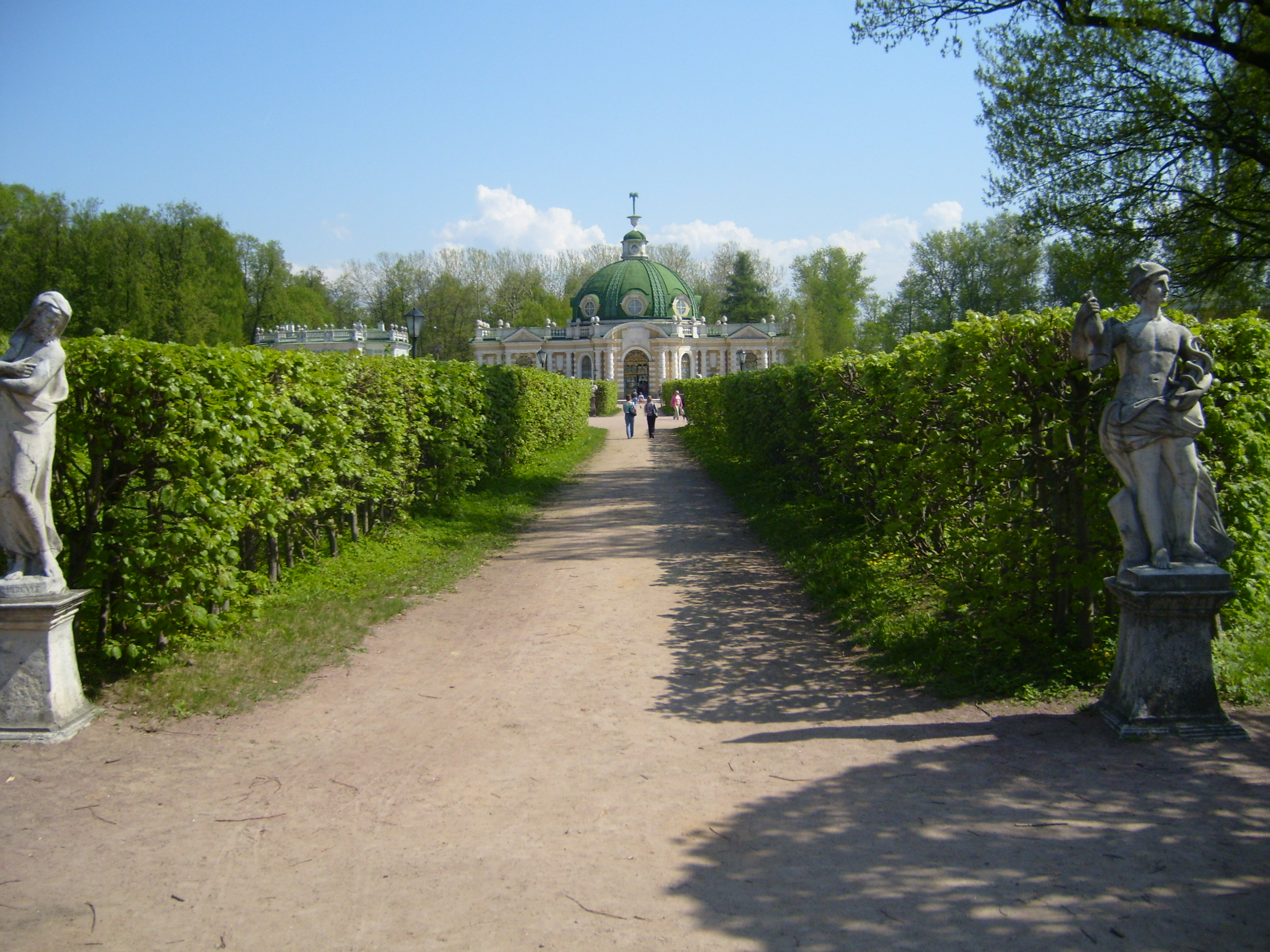
Garden à la Française and grotto at Kuskovo

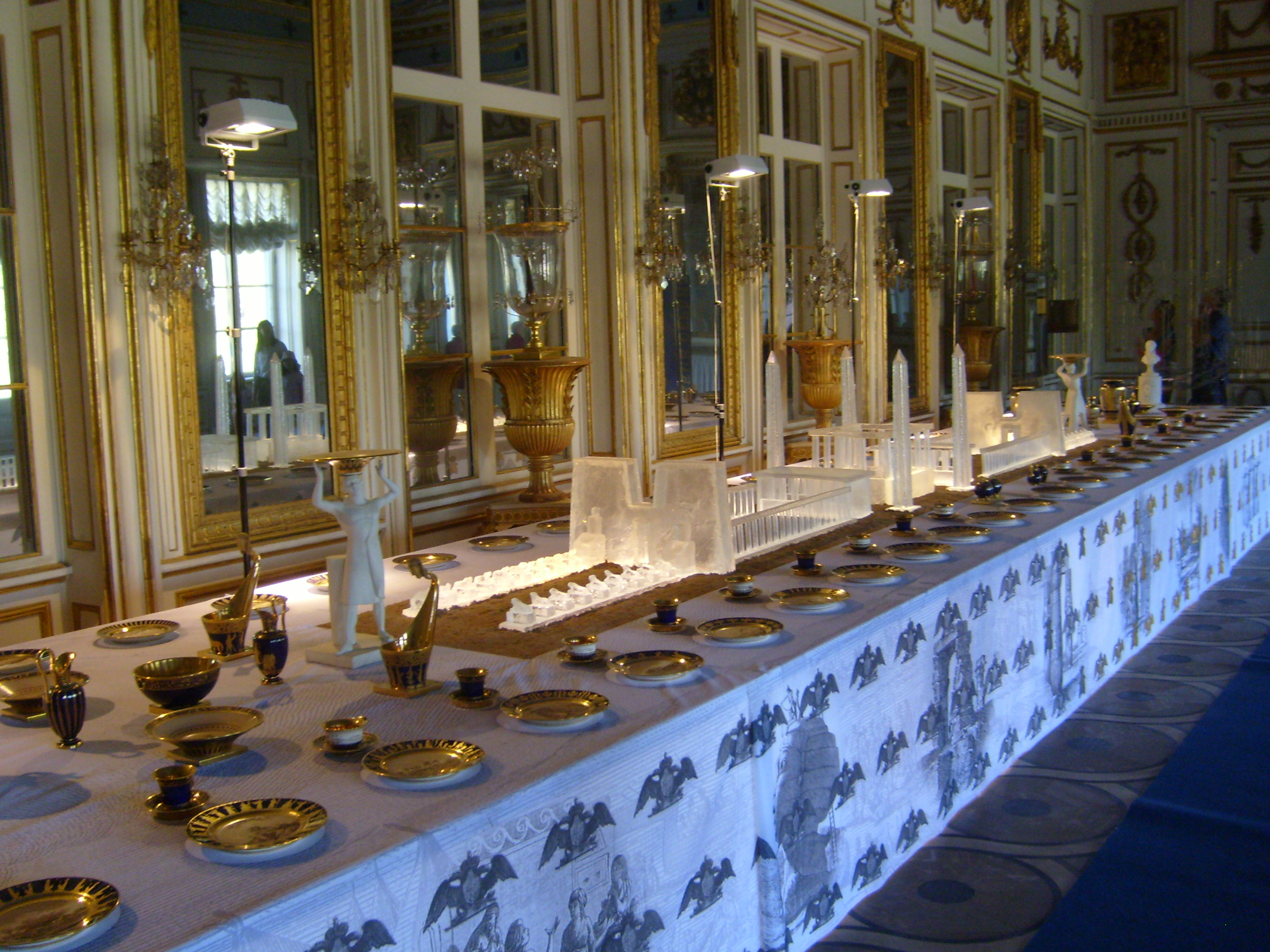
Service of Sèvres porcelain given by Napoleon to Czar Alexander I in 1807, on display in the Dancing Hall.

Kuskovo (Russian: Куско́во) was the summer country house and estate of the Sheremetev family. Built in the mid-18th century, it was originally situated several miles to the east of Moscow but now is part of the East District of the city. It was one of the first great summer country estates of the Russian nobility, and one of the few near Moscow still preserved. Today the estate is the home of the Russian State Museum of Ceramics, and the park is a favourite place of recreation for Muscovites.

== History ==
In the 17th century, Kuskovo became the property of Boris Petrovich Sheremetev (1652–1719), a Russian field marshal under Czar Peter the Great, who led the Russian Army in the victory over the Swedes at the Battle of Poltava (1707) in the Great Northern War. There was already a wooden church on the site, a house and several ponds.

The palace was constructed by his son Petr Borisovich Sheremetev (1713–1788). Count Sheremetev was one of the richest men in Russia, close to the court and a patron of the arts. He built Kuskovo at approximately the same time that he built a city palace on the banks of the Fontanka River in St. Petersburg. When he decided to build a palace at Kuskovo, he ordered that it be larger and more beautiful than the estates of other nobles, and equal to any residence of the Czars. Since it was less than a day's journey from the center of Moscow, it was not designed to accommodate overnight guests, nor for agriculture or any other practical purpose, but purely as a place for entertainment, ceremony and festivities.

The Dutch House was constructed between 1749 and 1751 by architect Y.I. Kologrivov, who then enlarged the pond into a lake and laid out the park and canals. After the death of Kologrivov in 1754, the construction of the palace was begun by the young architect Fiodor I. Argunov, who had designed the grotto and the belvedere by the canal in the eastern part of the park. When Fiodor Argunov became occupied with the construction of the Sheremetev house on the Fontanka in St. Petersburg, the task of designing the palace was given to the famous Moscow architect Karl Blank.

The twenty-six rooms of the palace were designed for entertaining and impressing guests on state occasions. Count Sheremetev entertained in a grand style; his outdoor entertainments in the park attracted as many twenty-five thousand guests. Entertainments included his a famous theater and orchestra with serf actors. The estate was visited by Empress Catherine II in 1775; an obelisk in the park marks the event.

By the end of the 18th century, the estate went into a decline. It was badly damaged during the French invasion in 1812. In the 1830s, the serf theater was torn down. After the abolition of serfdom in 1861, parcels of land were divided up and rented out.

After the 1917 Revolution, the estate was nationalized. In 1919 the palace was turned into a small museum of natural history. Ten years later it became the home of the state museum of porcelain, which had been founded in 1918–20 on Podossensky Street in Moscow. It housed the nationalized collections of Russian art collectors A. Morozov, L. Zoubalov, and Botkine. In 1932 it was renamed the State Museum of Ceramics.

== The Palace of Kuskovo ==
The palace was designed in the new neoclassical style, then becoming popular for state buildings in St. Petersburg and Moscow. The exterior was made of wooden planks, which were plastered and painted in soft pastel colors. The palace looked out onto a court of honor, formed by the palace, the church and the large lake. The six-column portico at the front of the house was designed with a ramp so that carriages with as many as eight horses could come directly to the front door. When the carriage arrived, servants would rush out the front doors and hold the horses while the guests descended.

== The Park of Kuskovo ==
The park of Kuskovo was created between 1750 and 1780 as a formal Garden à la française, with large ornamental parterres of flowers, carefully trimmed hedges, and alleys which met at either right or diagonal angles, and were ornamented with statues, and lined with either rows of trees trimmed into spheres, large vases; orange trees; or myrtle trees trimmed into cones. Eight park alleys converge in a single point, where the circular Hermitage pavilion (1764–77) now stands. Count Sheremetev spent most of his time in the Hermitage, coming to the Palace only for formal occasions and holidays.

== The Grotto ==
The grotto was constructed between 1755 and 1761 by the architect F. Argunov, and was intended to represent the palace of the King of the Seas.

== The Dutch House ==
A traditional brick Dutch house was constructed in the 1750s on a small pond near the Palace. the house has kitchen on the ground floor decorated from floor to ceiling with tiles from Delft.

== The Orangerie ==
The orangerie (1761–1764) was designed by F. Argounov.

In 1919 the palace was nationalized, and it was declared the State Museum of Ceramics twenty years later.

== The State Museum of Ceramics ==
The museum in the Orangerie contains collections of fine porcelain assembled by Russian merchants and Empress Maria Fedorovna before the Russian Revolution. The major sections are:

- German porcelain of the 18th and 19th centuries, particularly from the royal porcelain works at Meissen
- English porcelain from Chelsea and Josiah Wedgwood.
- French porcelain from the 18th century from manufacture royale of Sèvres. One highlight of the collection is the Egyptian service, commissioned by Napoleon Bonaparte in 1798 to commemorate his Egyptian campaign, and presented by Napoleon to Czar Alexander I at the Tilsit Conference in 1807.
- Danish porcelain of the 18th and 19th century.
- Russian and Soviet porcelain of the 18th, 19th and 20th century. The collection of porcelain on revolutionary themes from the early Soviet period is particularly notable.

== Gallery ==
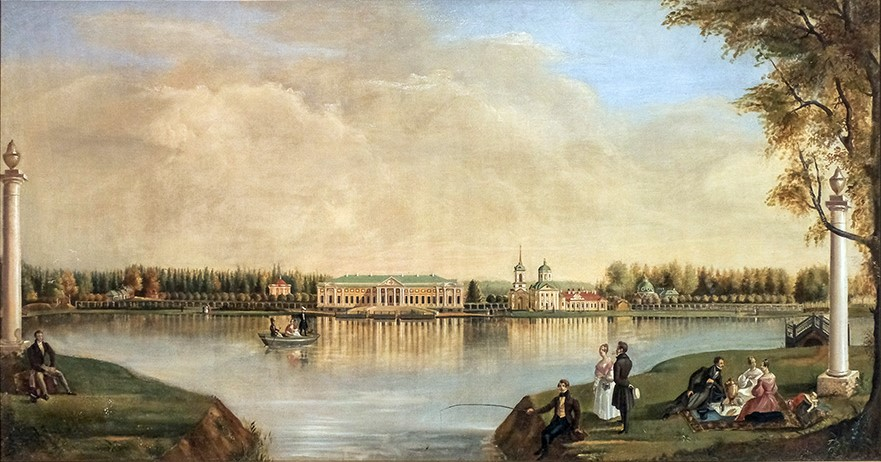
View of Kuskovo in 1839

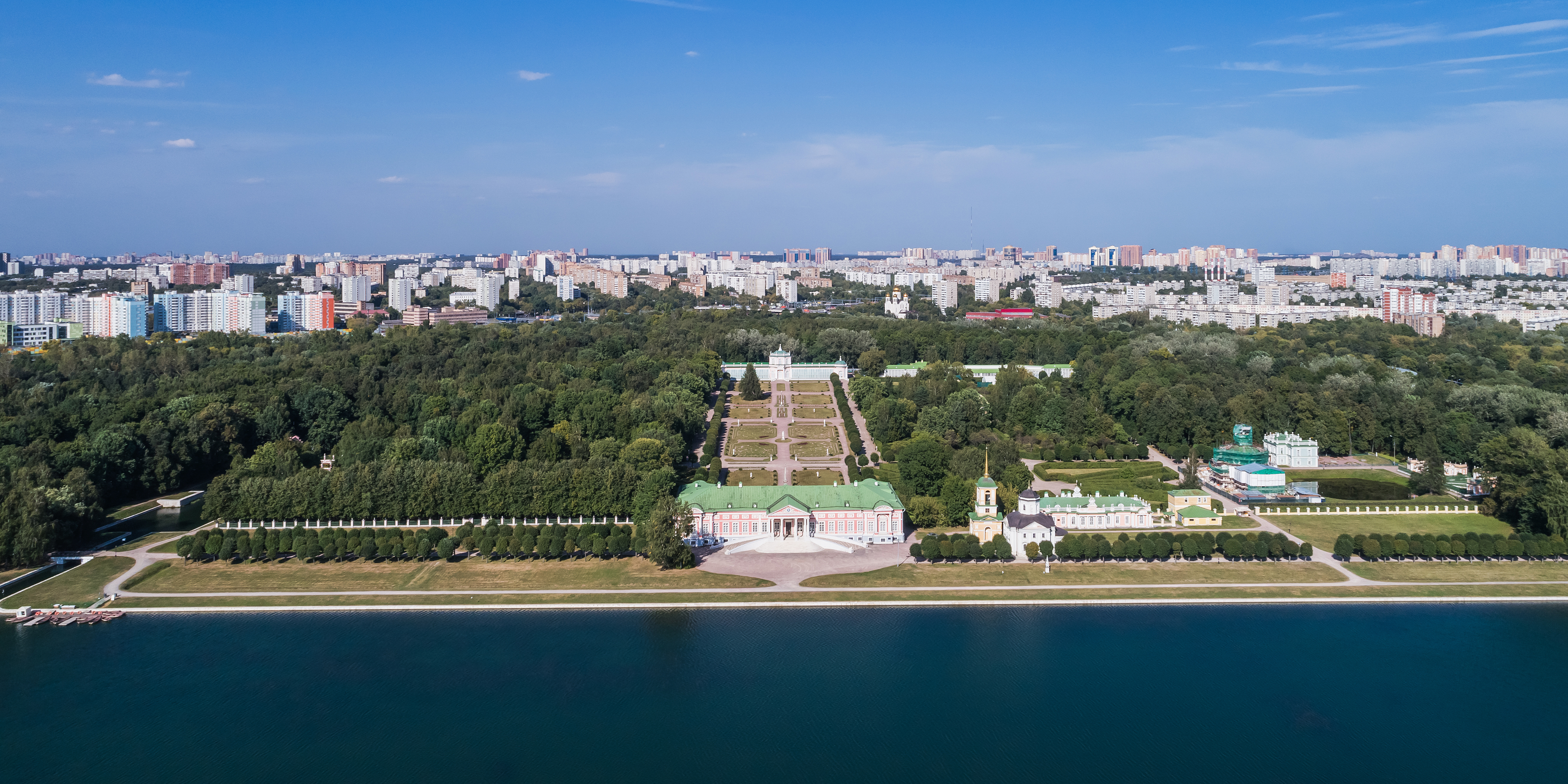
General view

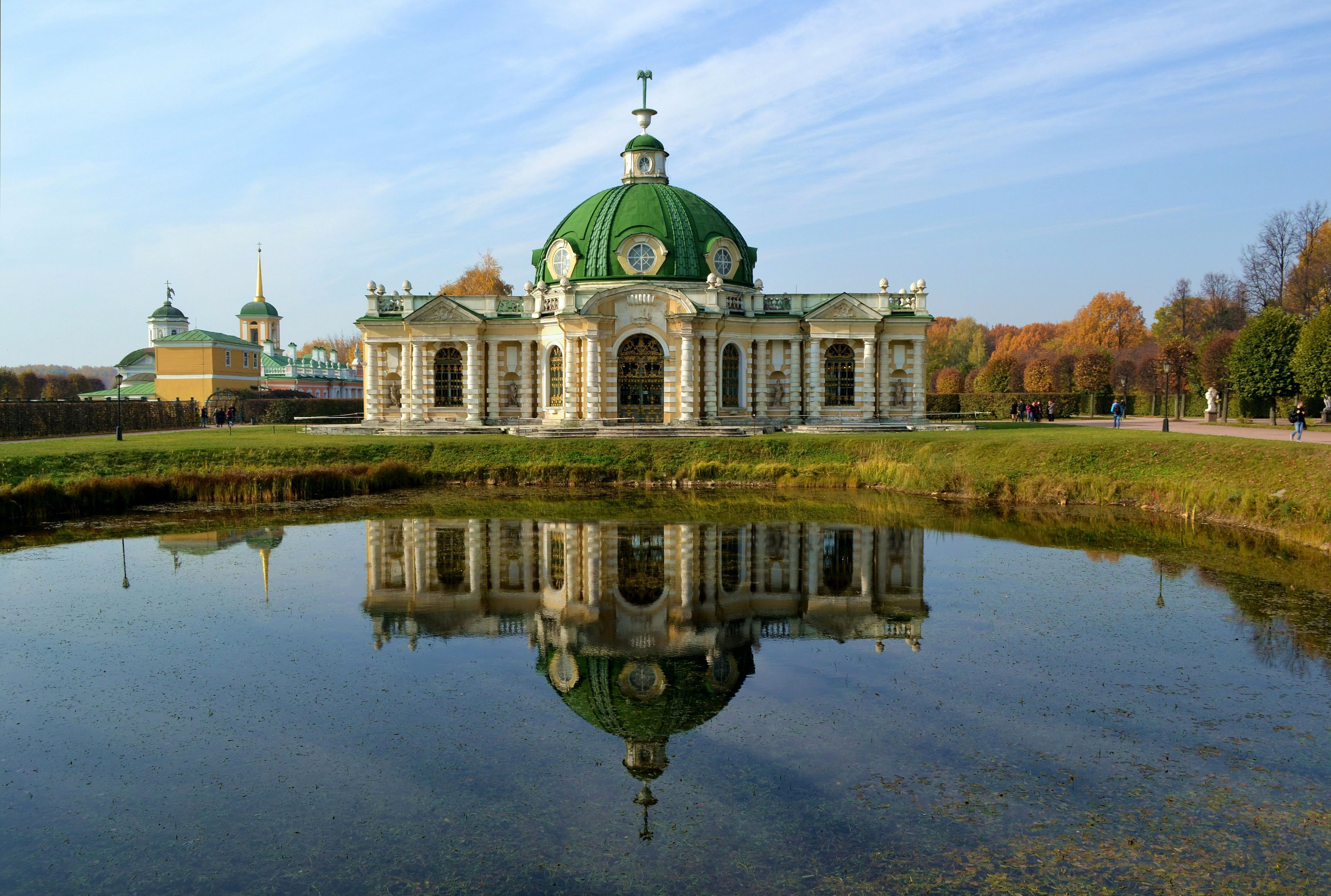
Grotto

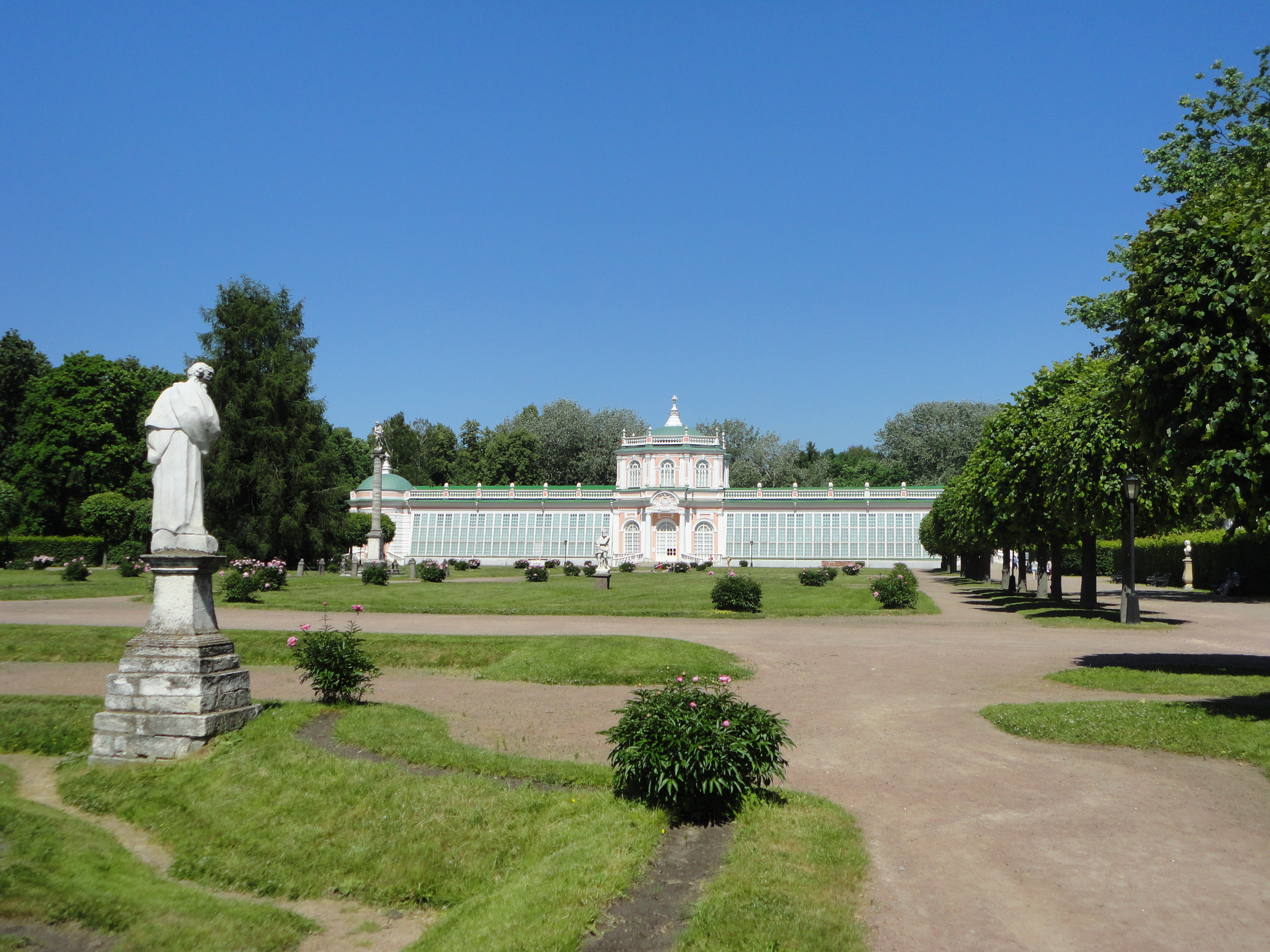
View of the Orangerie

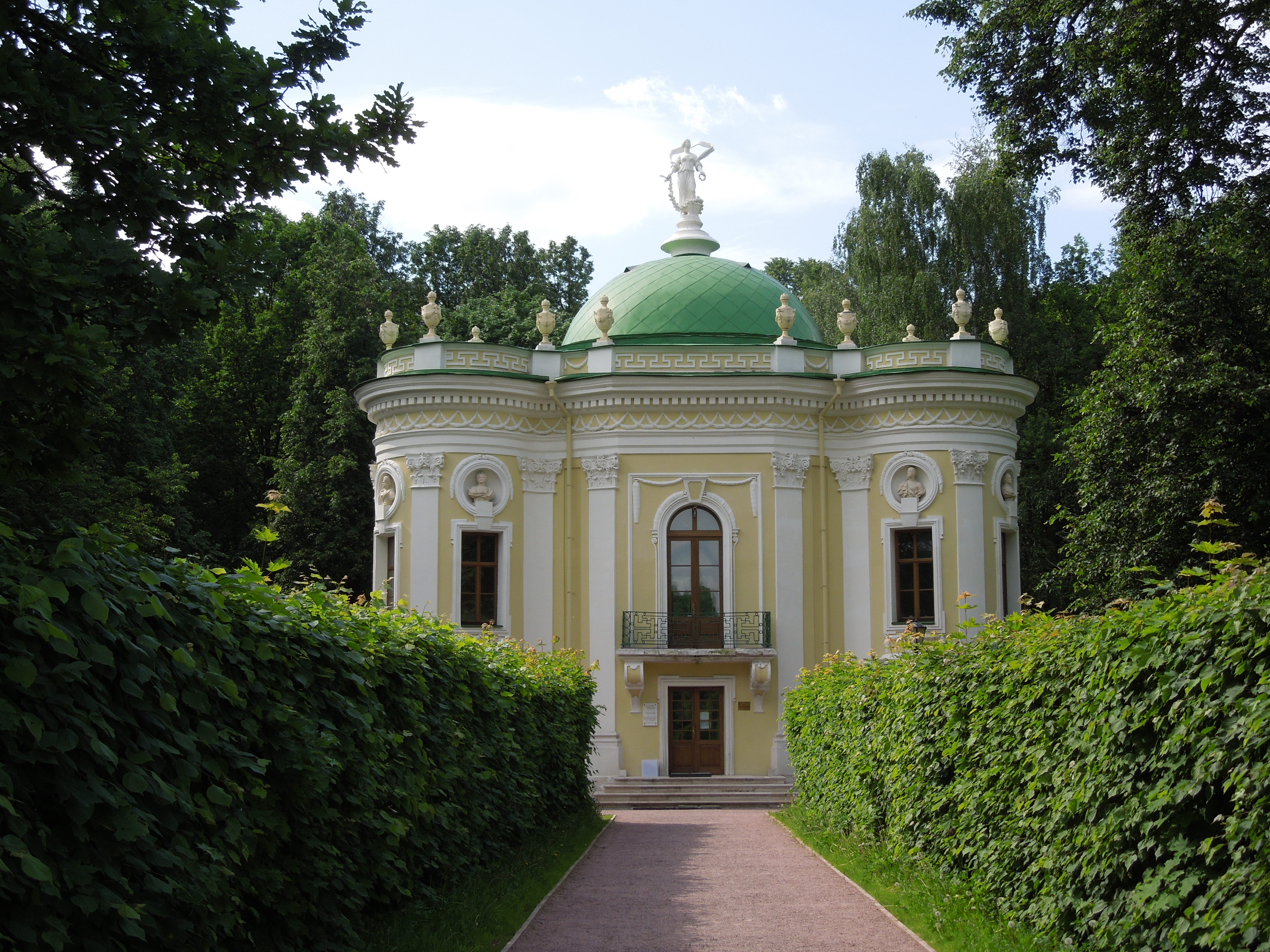
Hermitage

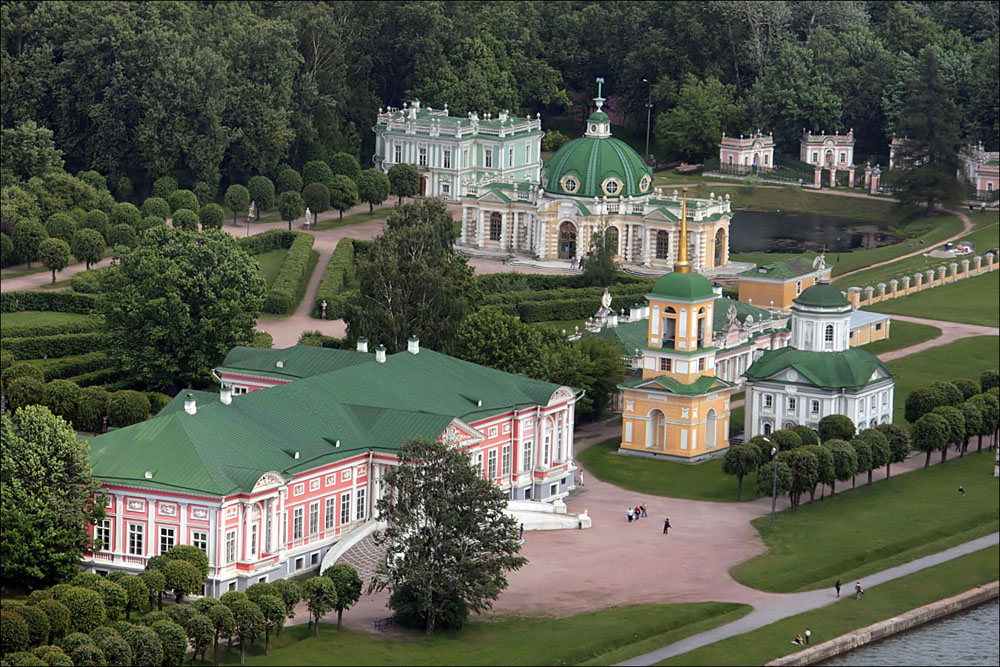
Aerial view of Kuskovo in 2008

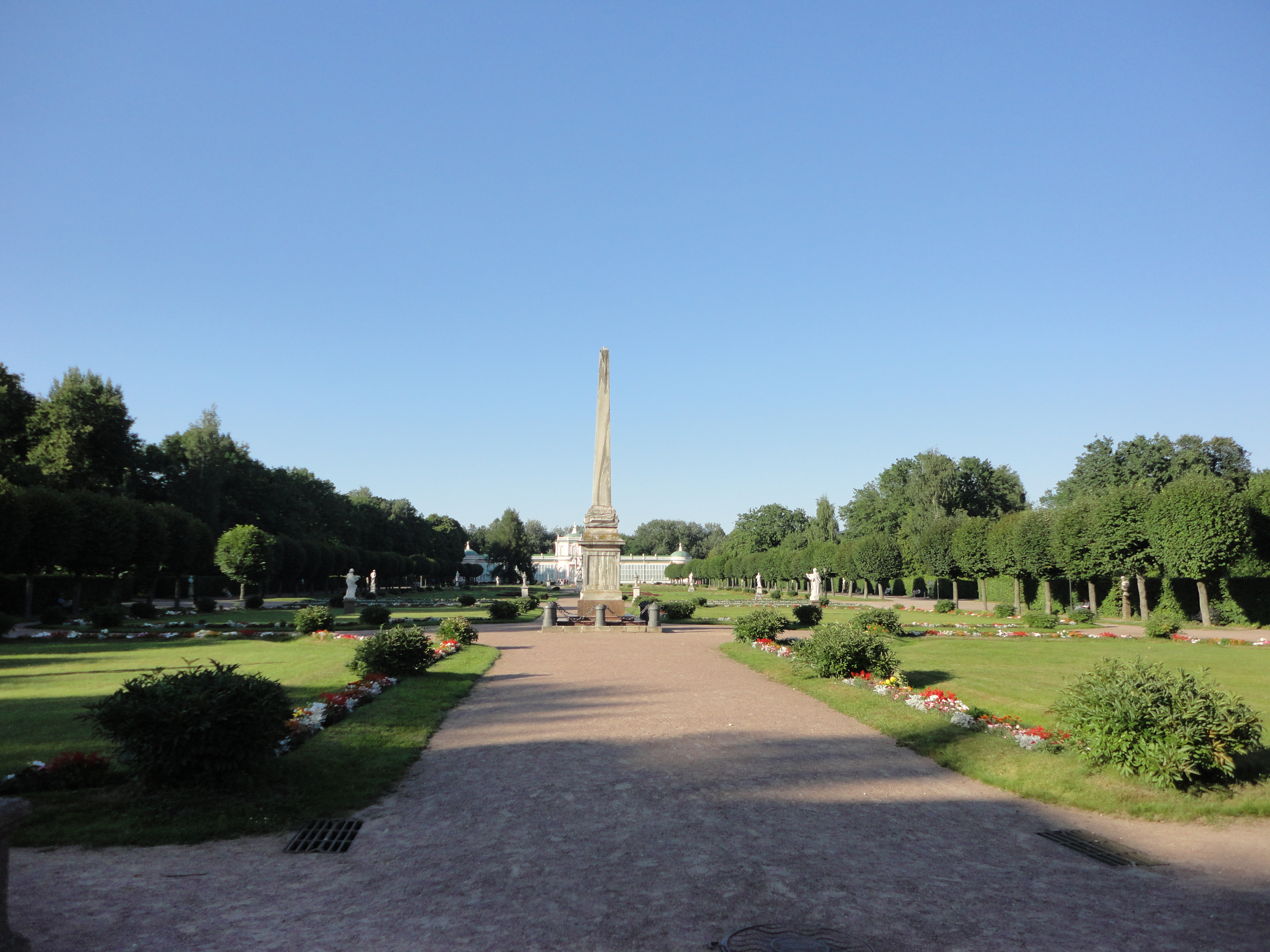
Park

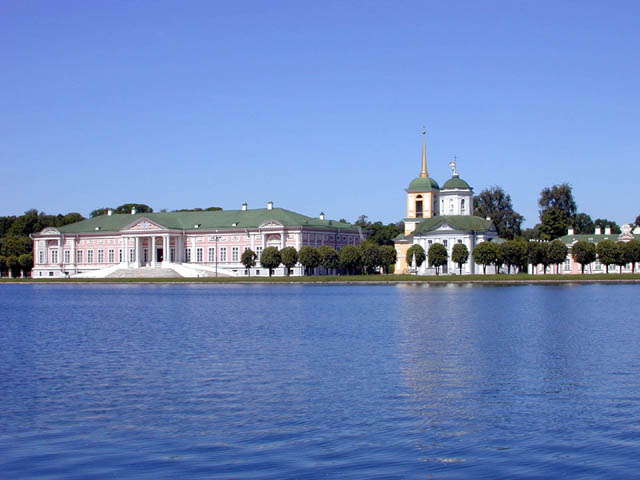
View of Kuskovo in 1999

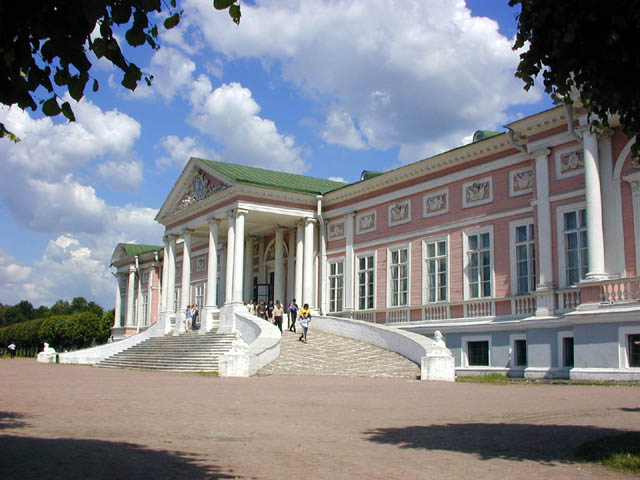
Sheremetev Palace in Kuskovo.

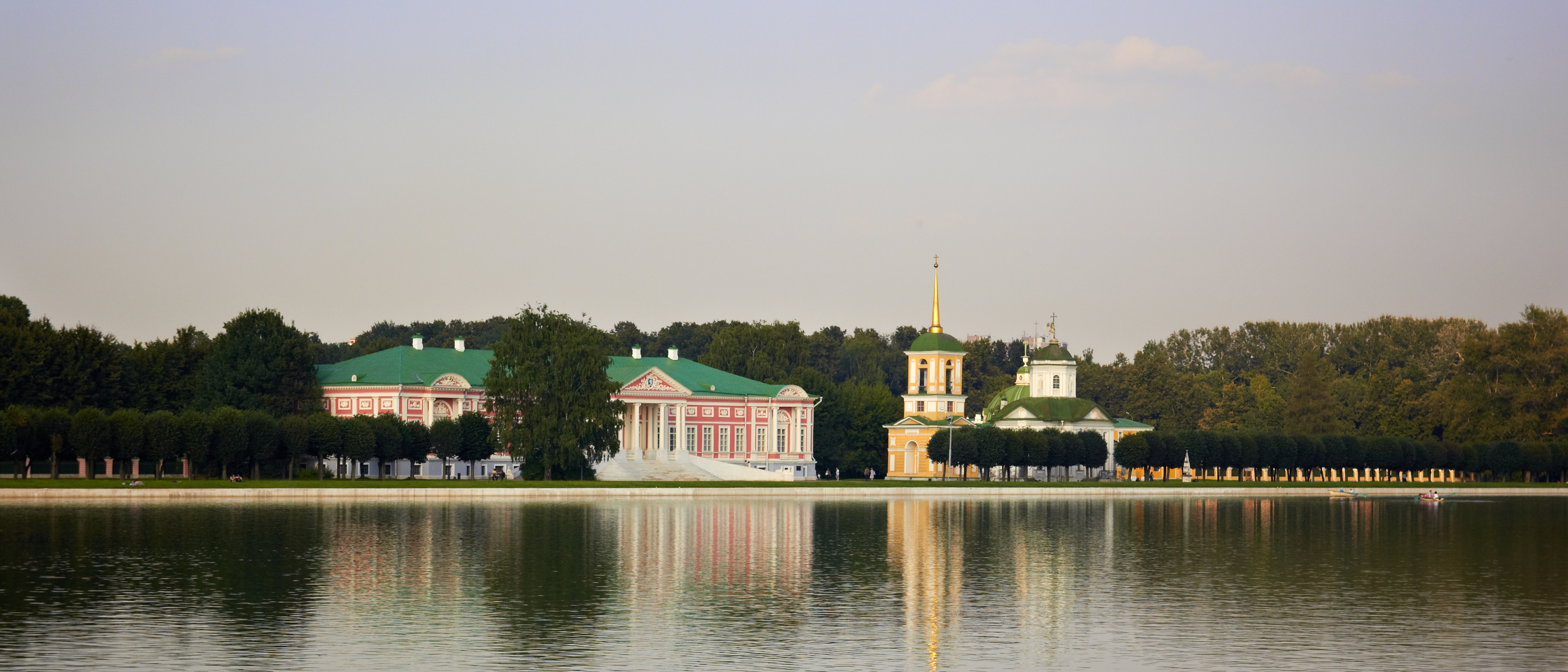
View of Kuskovo

== Bibliography ==
- Elena Eritsyan, Guide to the State Museum of Ceramics and the 18th Century Kuskovo Estate, 1996.
- Boris Brodsky, "Les Trésors Artistiques de Moscou", Izibrazitelnoye Iskustvo, 1991.
- A.L Batalov, E.I. Kirichenko, M.M. Posokhin, A.V. Kuzmin, E.G. Schoboleva, Pamyatniki Arkhitecturi Moskviy, Okrestnosti Staroy Moskviy, Moscow, Iskusstvo-XXI Vek, 2207.
