= Suvorov (disambiguation) =

Suvorov (Russian surname and place name; depending on the language of origin is also found in forms: Suworow, Souvorov), sometimes spelled Suvarov or Suvorof in English, may refer to:

== People ==
- House of Suvorov
  - Alexander Suvorov (1729–1800), Russian general in service of the Russian Empire and the Habsburgs, founder of Russian military theory
  - Alexander Arkadyevich Suvorov (1804–1882), Russian general and diplomat, son of Arkadi Suvorov
  - Arkadi Suvorov (1784–1811), Russian general, son of Alexander Suvorov
- Aleksey Suvorov (born 1991), Russian speed-skater
- Alexandru Suvorov (born 1987), Moldovan football player
- Andrei Suvorov (1887–1917), Russian footballer
- Georgii Suvorov (1919–1984), Soviet mathematician
- Igor Suvorov (born 1948), Russian banker
- Maxim Suvorov (died 1770), director of the printing house of the Russian Synod
- Nikolay Suvorov, Soviet commander of the Soviet submarine K-429 in 1983
- Oleg Suvorov (born 1997), Russian footballer
- Sergei Suvorov (1869–1918), Russian statistician, philosopher and revolutionary
- Viktor Suvorov (born 1947), Russian writer and a former Soviet military intelligence officer

== Places ==
- Suvorov, Tula Oblast, Russia
- Suvorov (inhabited locality), several inhabited localities in Russia
- Dumbrăveni, Vrancea, Romania, formerly known as Generalisimul Suvorov
- Suwarrow, or Suvorov, in the Cook Islands
- Suvorov Glacier, Antarctica

== Ships ==
- Aleksandr Suvorov (ship), a Russian/Soviet river cruise ship, launched 1981
- Soviet cruiser Aleksandr Suvorov 1951–1990
- Russian battleship Knyaz Suvorov, 1901–1905

== Other uses ==
- Suvorov (film), a 1941 Soviet film
- Suvorov Military School, a type of boarding school in the Soviet Union, Russia and Belarus
- Suvorov military canals, in Finland
- 2489 Suvorov, a minor planet

== See also ==
- Suvorovo (disambiguation)
- Sergie Sovoroff (1901–1989), an Aleut educational leader
- Yuri Suvarov, a fictional character in the 24 TV series
- Order of Suvorov, a Soviet/Russian military decoration
