= Maria Alexeievna Naryshkina =

Russian noblewoman

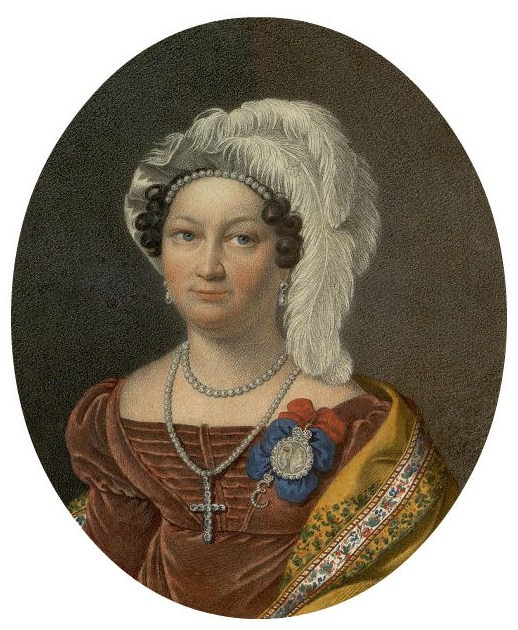
- Born: Maria Alexeievna Senyavina; 9 March [O.S. 20 March ] 1762
- Died: 22 December [O.S. 3 January] 1822; Saint Petersburg, Russian Empire
- Noble family: Senyavin
- Spouse: Aleksandr Lvovich Naryshkin
- Issue: Kirill Aleksandrovich Naryshkin; Elena Alexandrovna Naryshkina
- Father: Alexei Naumovich Senyavin
- Mother: Anna Elisabeth von Bradke

Maria Alexeievna Naryshkina (née Senyavina; 20 March [O.S. 9 March] 1762 - 3 January 1823 [O.S. 22 December 1822]) was a Russian noblewoman, pupil of the Smolny Institute and a maid of honour to Catherine the Great.

== Biography ==
Maria Alexeivna was a daughter of Admiral Alexei Naumovich Senyavin (1722-1797) and Anna Elizabeth von Bradke (1733-1776). On 3 July 1776, aged five, she entered the Smolny Institute of Noble Maidens. She graduated in 1779 and two years later, in December of 1781 she was granted the rank of maid of honour.

On 29 January 1783, Maria married chamberlain Aleksandr Lvovich Naryshkin (1760-1826), later Chief Director of the Imperial Theatres and Marshal of Nobility.

During the reigns of Catherine II, Paul I and Alexander I, they maintained high positions in the royal court. The couple led a luxurious, open lifestyle and were well known for their opulent balls and receptions. In her memoirs Varvara Golovina wrote:

"A large company would gather at Naryshkin's... The host's daughters would bustle about, coyly act; it was a real farce. Naryshkin's house was generally distinguished by the fact that it was visited daily by the most motley company. The host was pleased mainly by the large number of guests, even though they were a mixed lot."

Her older sister, Yekaterina Sinyavina was said to surpass her in beauty, though opinions of contemporaries differed on their moral qualities. Many envied and slandered the Naryshkins, such as Rostopchin who described Maria and her husband as "people of false modesty and honesty, skillfully hiding their souls". Meanwhile Vigel endowed Maria Alexeievna with "noble feelings, thrift, aristocratic pride and a tough disposition".

She was no stranger to charity and was amongst the first to join the Women's Patriotic Society in 1812. She was also an artist, fond of sculpture and creating busts, as well as reliefs which she is said to have done with perfection.

In general, her name does not appear in scandals of Russian society of that time, thought Catherine the Great teased her husband, that a certain Azikov was disputing his marital rights. Naryshkin, who loved to joke about himself, sang the aria 'She is my passion' (which was fashionable at the time) in front of the empress, replacing the word 'passion' with 'woman' whilst winking in Azikov's direction.

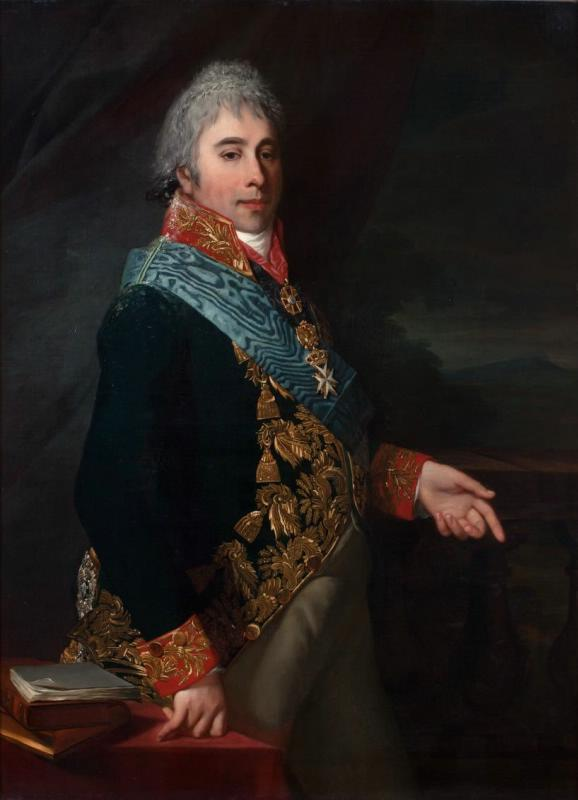
Maria's husband, Alexander Naryshkin by Mosnier, 1803

Count Vrontsov, her brother-in-law, wrote of Maria:

"I like her very much, I think that my sister Maria Alekseevna has always been ideal in her behavior: an exemplary daughter, a good sister, a loving wife and a caring mother."

On 29 May 1799, Maria Alexeievna was made a Dame of the Order St. Catherine (Small Cross) and on 1 January 1808, she was made a lady-in-waiting. Romours claimed that she wanted to be made a Dame of the Grand Cross, and that the failure to do this was the reason she persuaded her husband to go abroad. She and her husband were asked to accompany Empress Elizabeth Alexeievna to the Vienna Congress. After this, the couple spend several years abroad. They lived a luxurious life in Florence where they had palazzos and a villa outside the city.

Maria Alexeievna died of tuberculosis on 3 January 1823 in Saint Petersburg and was buried in the Alexander Nevsky Lavra.

Konstantin Bulgakov to his brother on the topic of her death:

"Only here do they talk about Naryshkina... She said goodbye to all her family, gave instructions to her husband and son and touched them so much that they wept incessantly. She confessed and took communion and is completely at peace. Yesterday she began to fall into oblivion, and no one hoped that she would live through today. She is 62 years old, more than forty years since she was married. She gave all her diamonds to her granddaughters, Suvorova's daughters. There are more than a million worth of them."

== Issue ==
Maria Alexeivna Naryshkina had two sons and two daughters during the course of her marriage.

- Lev Alexandrovich (1785-1846), lieutenant general and participant in the war of 1812. He married Countess Olga Potocka (1802-1861).
- Elena Alexandrovna (1785-1855), married Arkadi Suvorov (1784-1811) in 1800, and then Prince Vladimir Golitsyn (1792-1856), son of Varvara Golitsyna.
- Kirill Alexandrovich (1785-1846), Chief Hofmeister, Actual Privy Counsellor. He married Princess Maria Yakovlevna Lobanova-Rostovskaya (1789-1854).
- Maria Alexandrovna (died 1800), died in childhood.
Children

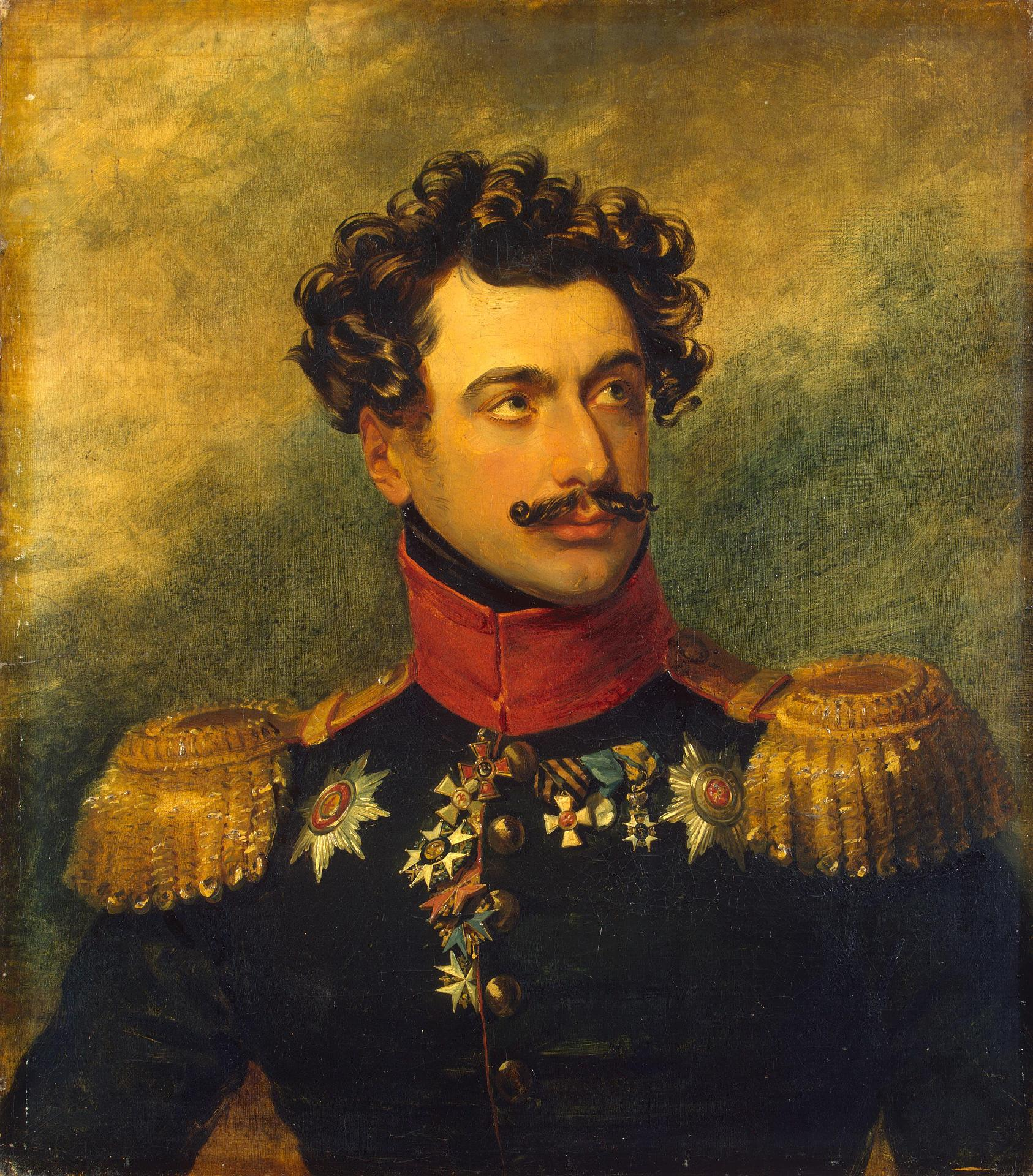
Lev Alexandrovich

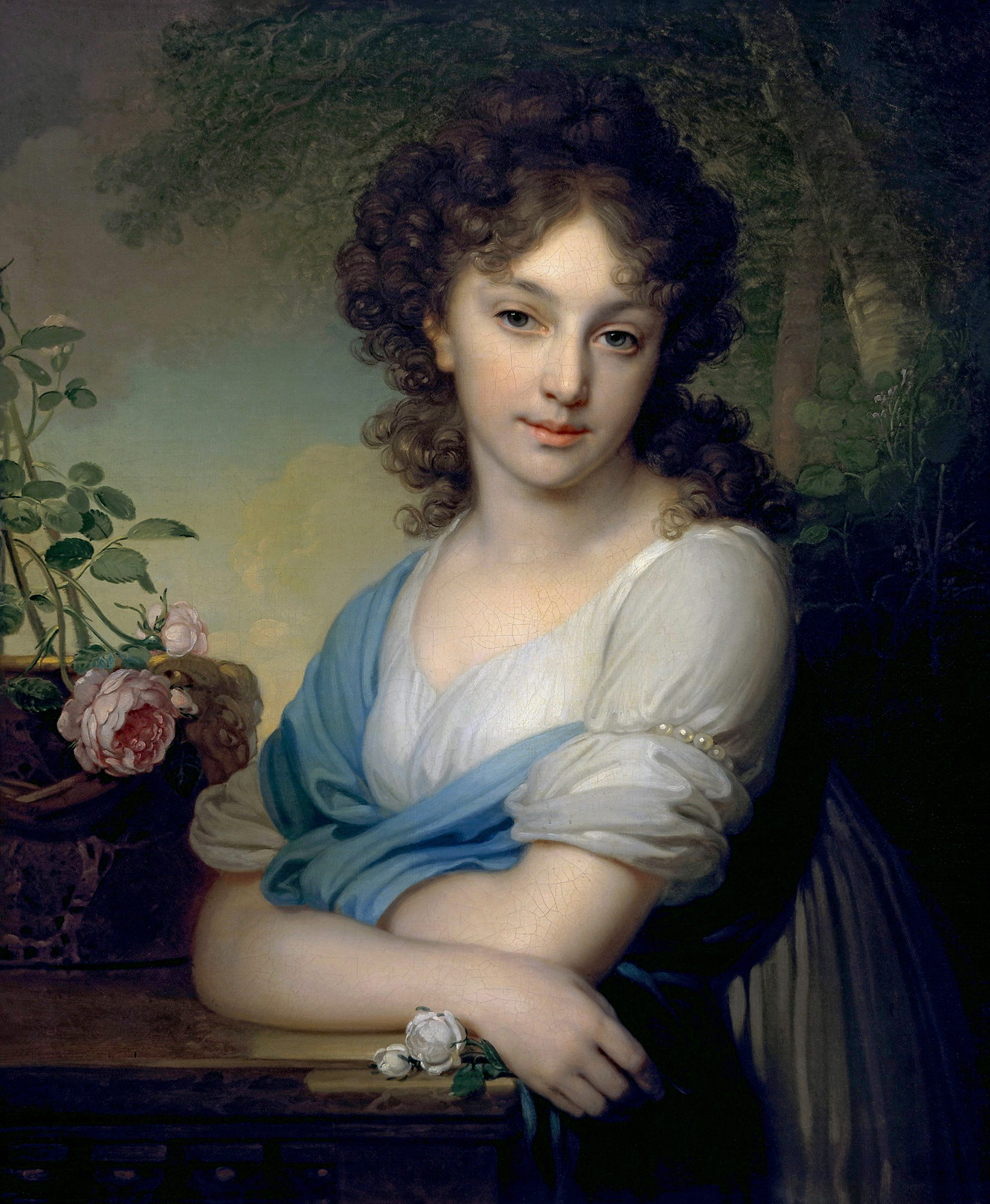
Elena Alexandrovna

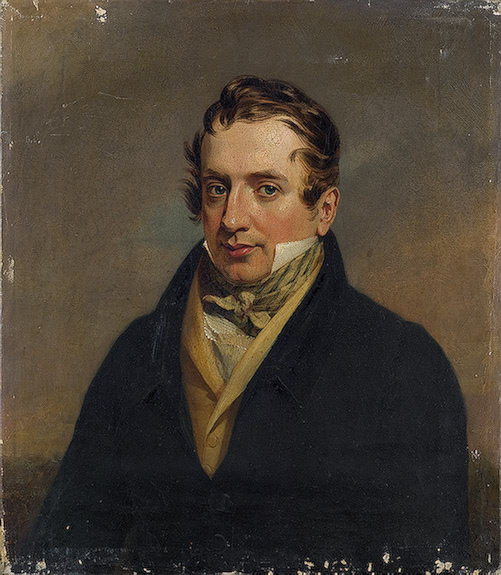
Kirill Alexandrovich
