= House of Suvorov =

Russian noble family

Suvorov Суворовы
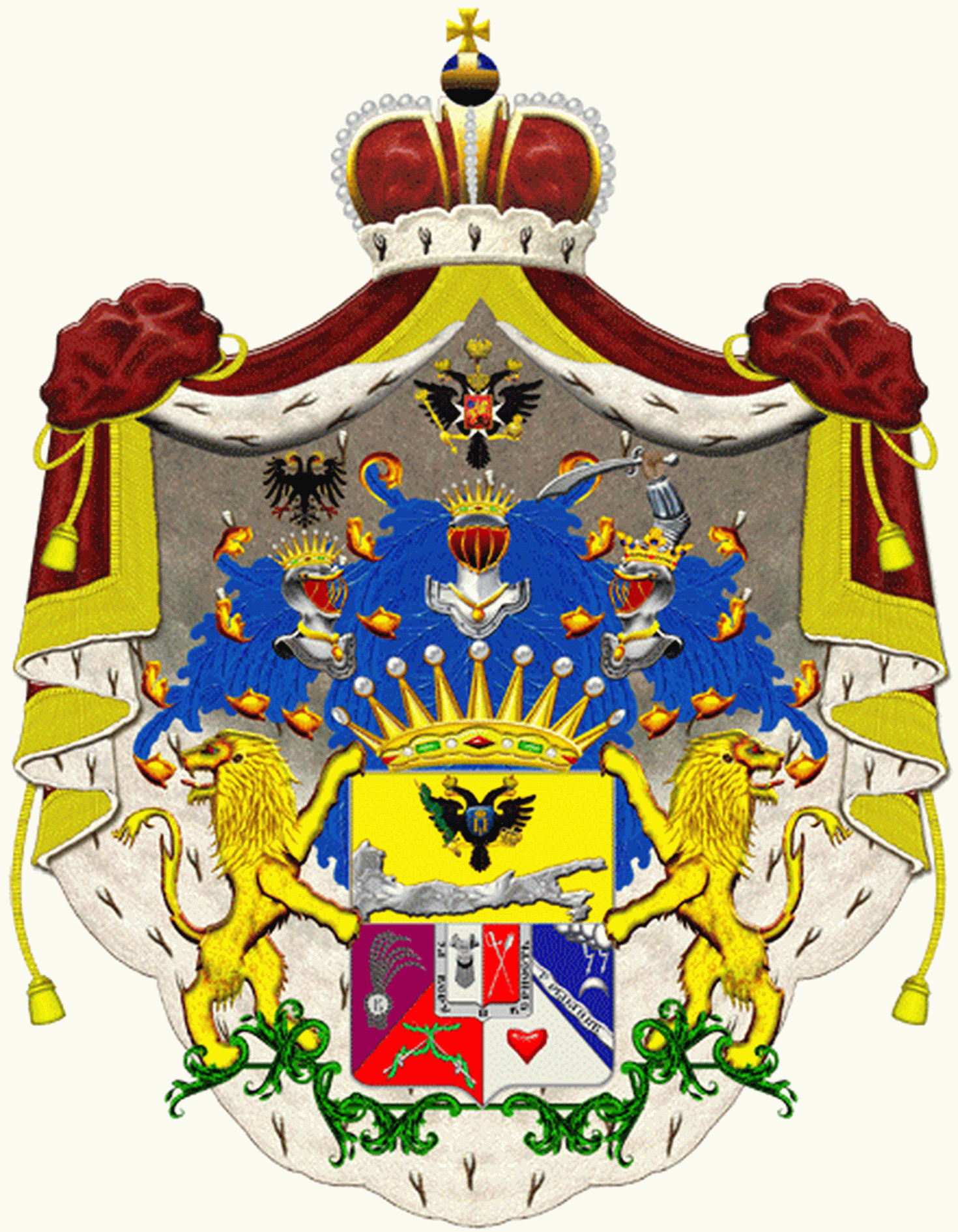
- "For faith and faithfulness"
- Country: Russia; Principality of Moscow; Tsardom of Russia; Russian Empire
- Etymology: Russian: Суворый (Note: Siberian, Permyak, and Olonets word. "Суровый" is one of its meanings.), romanized: Suvory, lit. 'Severe'
- Place of origin: Russia
- Titles: • Russian: Граф Рымникский, romanized: Graf Rymniksky, lit. 'Count of the Rymnik'; • Князь Италийский, Knyaz Italiysky, 'Prince of Italy'
- Estate(s): Konchanskoye

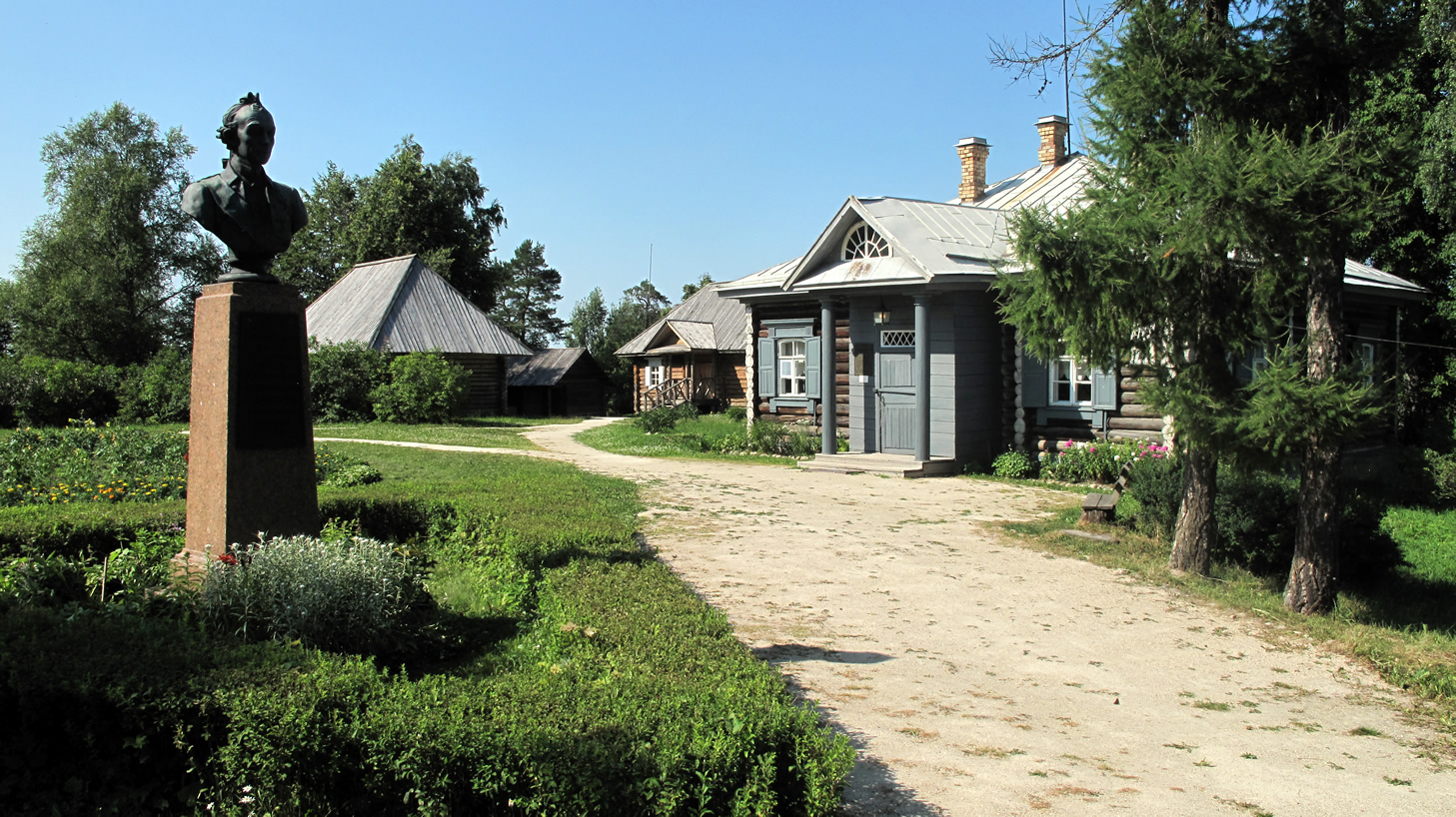
Museum-Estate of A. V. Suvorov

The House of Suvorov (Russian: Суворовы, romanized: Suvorovy, lit. 'Suvorovs') implies a Russian noble family. The family name is occasionally spelled as Suvarov, Suvorof, Suworow or Souvorov.

== Description ==
Its origins cannot be pinpointed, as the genealogy is under-researched and a controversial family legend, not documented, tells of the house's descent from Swedish lands; the house goes back to the end of the 16th century. For A. V. Suvorov-Rymniksky's epoch, it was apt for Russian nobles to deduce their descent from foreigners. The nobility tried to adorn themselves with foreign coats of arms.

An alleged ancestor of A. V. Suvorov, Ivan Parfenyevich Suvorov, was killed in 1655 by Poles–Lithuanians near Dubrowna (Russo-Polish War of 1654–1667). His great-grandson is Vasily Ivanovich (1705–1775) and great-great-grandson is Count A. V. Suvorov-Rymniksky, Prince of Italy, — his son is Prince Arkady Alexandrovich, Adjutant General, Lieutenant General, drowned in the Rymnik River in 1811 (Russo-Turkish War of 1806–1812). This is the same river where the battle of Rymnik was fought. He left two sons: Constantine (1809–1877), Court-Master, who had no offspring, and Alexander. With the death in 1893 of the only son of Prince Alexander Arkadyevich Suvorov, Arkady, (Note: Another Arkady.) the princely family of Suvorovs was cut off in the male generation. The noble branch comes from Alexander Ivanovich Suvorov, Captain Lieutenant of the Guards (1709–753), uncle of generalissimo Suvorov. It is listed in Part VI of the genealogical book of Moscow, Tver, St. Petersburg, Novgorod and Vologda governorates (roll of arms, II, 14; IV, 7).

If the pedigree is based on actual facts, …then there is no reason to refute…the origin of the ancestor's name Suvor from the Swedish svår 'heavy, strong'. The reference to the Swedish origin of the Suvorov family is an ornament of the pedigree, contrived by its later creators. The elements' composition of the Suvorov coat of arms, which was created personally for Generalissimo A. V. Suvorov, in his time, confirms the Russian origin of the Suvorov family, and therefore, the surname of the Suvorovs is based on the Russian nickname Suvor (Suvory (Note: Russian: Суворый, lit. 'Severe'. This word is all three Siberian, Permyak, and Olonets.)) Surovy (Note: Russian: Суровый, lit. 'Severe').

— Nikolai Baskakov,

А. V. Suvorov-Rymniksky claimed that his house "comes from an ancient noble Swedish family". The ancestor, "called Suvor left for Russia in 1622 under Tsar Mikhail Fyodorovich, was accepted as a Russian subject", and upon him the present and future generations "began to be called Suvorovs". There is an analogous statement about leaving Sweden in the Genealogical collection of Russian noble families of 1876–1877 and it disproves the judgement of Swedish descent from 1622: Suvorovs' genealogy has Generalissimo's ancestors from those noblemen who in the 16th and 17th centuries had estates in Kashinsky Uyezd (it was located in Tver Governorate); particularly, Savely Suvorov lived in the late 16th century, and Parfeny Savelyevich Suvorov,—the father of the said Ivan Parfenyevich,—died in 1628. The mentioned book (as well as in the Russian genealogy book of 1855 from Pyotr Dolgorukov) says that the ancestors – unidentified – came out of Sweden in the early 16th century, that is, a century earlier than the Generalissimo himself indicated. Further appearance of A. V. Suvorov's Swedish forefathers, on the basis of a number of data, belonged to the times of Simeon the Proud, i.e. to the middle of the 14th century; but that is just a theory.

In 1699 in Russia there were already 19 Suvorov landlords, not counting servants of this surname. Based on Generalissimo Suvorov's own statement, it is hardly possible to assume such a growth of this family for 77 years. Moreover, the purely historical data do not agree with the genealogical hypothesis of the Generalissimo. In the Novgorod scribe books of Shelonskaya Pyatina is mentioned in the section of 1498 landowner Suvor, son of Nazim, owner of 11 villages in Shchirsky Povet (vol. 5, pp. 111–113). In the section of 1539 there is Vasily Suvorov, son of Nazim, a landowner who had died in 1545 and who owned the villages and pochinki ('new rural settlements') in the pogost Vyshgorod. One of the documents of 1566 bears the signature of the Clerk of the Treasury Court Suvorov-Postnik. In documents of the end of the 16th century there is a name of the landowner of Kashinsky Uyezd Savely Suvorov about whom it is possible to tell that he was an ancestor of Generalissimo on a direct line.

The surname "Suvorov", as Count S. R. Vorontsov pointed out in a letter (November 7–8, 1811) to his son M. S. Vorontsov, "…undoubtedly has purely Russian roots, since Suvor is most likely a nickname meaning a severe man". In the same letter S. R. Vorontsov wrote: "One author makes him [Generalissimo] a Livonian by descent… but Suvorov's name proves he was of Russian descent… His father… was, like Marshal Buturlin, a batman of Peter the Great before Livonia was conquered". Further Vorontsov expresses indignation that no one will engage in refuting the little reliable hypotheses about the foreign origin of the Russian warlord (Archive of Prince Vorontsov, book 17, 1880). When in 1790 Göttingen newspaper reported the German as if Generalissimo Suvorov's origin, Empress Catherine II wrote (1790) to Zimmermann: "There is no doubt that the surname of the Suvorovs has long been noble, Russian from time immemorial and lives in Russia".

Vasily Alexeyev, who studied Generalissimo Suvorov, in 1911 expressed his belief about the purely Russian origin of the Suvorovs. The uncanonical anthroponym Suvor as denoting suvory was found in many old Russian surnames. In the folk speech of the northern governorates, sullen and angry people were often called suvory: according to Alexeyev's testimony, he had heard the expression suvoritsya in the sense of getting angry even in Ostashkovsky Uyezd of Tver Governorate, where it apparently penetrated from more northern areas — Olonets and Novgorod governorates.

In 1756 Generalissimo's first cousin, Sergey Ivanovich Suvorov, in his ahnentafel at his son's enlistment stated that he had no evidence of the nobility's antiquity; he started his genealogy from his great-grandfather, landowner and votchinnik Grigory Ivanovich Suvorov, who served as a boyar scion at Kashin. Sergey enlisted his son in the service on his own merit. However, the relatedness of this particular Grigory to the Generalissimo is incompatible with the next version.

The version about the Suvorovs' origin from Moscow mandative people might be the case, — it needs further development. Another Grigory, whose patronymic is unknown and who was presumably the father of Ivan Grigoryevich (d. 1715), was a scrivener serving in the Moscow Prikaz of the Great Palace and who in 1665 had a cash salary of 23 rubles and a landed salary of 200 quarters. At the same time in the Moscow Monasterial Prikaz served as a scrivener Semyon Manukov — Alexander Vasilyevich's maternal great-grandfather. In the 17th-century Moscow also served as scriveners: Isak Suvorov, Alexey Suvorov—he also in the Monasterial Prikaz. The son of the last-mentioned Grigory, Ivan Grigoryevich, personally acquainted with Peter the Great, was also a scrivener in the prikaz of the Preobrazhensky Life Guards Regiment, General Scribe of the Preobrazhensky and Semyonovsky regiments, a sizeable votchinnik (brought and bartered votchinas in Vladimir [1699, 1710], Nizhny Novgorod, Penza, Pereyaslavl-Zalessky [1699, 1710], Suzdal, and Yaroslavl [1706, 1707] uezds), and had peculiar ties connected with the Moscow scrivener and court milieu, which had, in addition to noble roots, originated from the Moscow ecclesiastical, commercial and posad "elite". Ivan's first son Ivan Ivanovich was married to the daughter of a Moscow gost Syreyshchikov, his second son Vasily (Generalissimo's father) — to the daughter of the St. Petersburg voivode Manukov, formerly a scrivener and clerk of the Landed Prikaz, the third, Alexander, — to Countess Zotova, who also came from the famous family of a clerk and a teacher of Peter I.

Genealogical tree (fragment)

- Ivan Grigoryevich Suvorov (1670–1715)
  - Vasily Ivanovich Suvorov (1705–1775)
    - Alexander Vasilyevich Suvorov (1730–1800)
      - Natalya Aleksandrovna Suvorova (1775–1844)
        - Alexander Nikolayevich Zubov (1797–1875)
          - Platon Aleksandrovich Zubov (1835–1890)
        - Platon Nikolayevich Zubov (1798–1855)
        - Vera Nikolayevna Zubova (1800–1863)
          - Natalya Vladimirovna Mezentseva (1820–1895)
          - Mikhail Vladimirovich Mezentsev (1822–1888)
          - Sofya Vladimirovna Mezentseva (1825–1914)
          - Nikolay Vladimirovich Mezentsev (1827–1878)
        - Lyubov Nikolayevna Zubova (1802–1894)
          - Mikhail Ivanovich Leontyev (1824–1885)
        - Olga Nikolayevna Zubova (1803–1882)
          - Natalya Aleksandrovna Talyzina (1829–1892)
          - Maria Aleksandrovna Neidgardt (1831–1904)
          - Arkady Aleksandrovich Talyzin (1838–1896)
        - Valerian Nikolayevich Zubov (1804–1857)
      - Arkady Aleksandrovich Suvorov (1784–1811)
        - Maria Arkadyevna Suvorova (1802–1870)
          - Alexandra Mikhailovna Golitsyna (1823–1884)
        - Varvara Arkadyevna Suvorova (1803–1885)
          - Alexander Dmitriyevich Bashmakov (1825–1888)
        - Alexander Arkadyevich Suvorov (1804–1882)
          - Lyubov Aleksandrovna Suvorova (1831–1883)
          - Alexandra Aleksandrovna Suvorova (1844–1927)
        - Constantine Arkadyevich Suvorov (1809–1878)
    - Anna Vasilyevna Suvorova (1744–1813)

== Sources ==
- Arsenyev, Konstantin; Petrushevsky, Fyodor (1901). Brockhaus and Efron Encyclopedic Dictionary (in Russian). Vol. 62: Статика – Судоустройство. Friedrich A. Brockhaus (Leipzig), Ilya A. Efron (Saint Petersburg). p. 899.
- Polovtsov, Alexander (1912). Russian Biographical Dictionary. Vol. 20: Суворова – Ткачев. St. Petersburg: Типография Товарищества "Общественная Польза". pp. 97–98.
- Superanskaya, Alexandra [in Russian] (2005). "Суворов — суровый". Nauka i Zhizn (8). Moscow.
- Rummel, Vitold [in Russian]; Golubtsov, Vladimir [in Russian] (1887). Родословный сборник русских дворянских фамилий [Genealogical collection of Russian noble families]. Vol. 2. St. Petersburg: Издание А. С. Суворина. pp. 438–439.
- Grebelsky, Pyotr; Dumin, Stanislav [in Russian]; Shumkov, Andrey [in Russian]; Katin-Yartsev, Mikhail; Lenczewski, Tomasz (1995). Дворянские роды Российской империи [Noble families of the Russian Empire]. Vol. 2. St. Petersburg: ИПК "Вести". p. 153. ISBN 5-86153-004-1.
- Mogilnikov, V. (2003). "Новая версия происхождения полководца А. В. Суворова" [A new version of the origin of military commander A. V. Suvorov]. Генеалогический вестник (13). St. Petersburg.
- Osipov, K. [in Russian] (1955). Александр Васильевич Суворов (3rd, revised ed.). Moscow: Voenizdat. pp. 3–5.
- Dal, Vladimir (1882). Explanatory Dictionary of the Living Great Russian Language (in Russian). Vol. 4 (2nd ed.). St. Petersburg, Moscow: M. O. Wolf.
