= Alexander Suvorov (disambiguation) =

Alexander Suvorov (1729–1800) was a Russian general and military theorist.

Alexander Suvorov may also refer to:

- Alexander Arkadyevich Suvorov (1804–1882), Russian general, diplomat and politician, and a grandson of the general born 1729
- Aleksandr Suvorov (politician, born 1943) (1943–2022), Russian politician and senator from Tomsk Oblast
- Aleksandr Suvorov (politician, born 1949) (born 1949), Russian politician, senator and chairman of the Duma of Koryak Autonomous Okrug
- Aleksandr Suvorov (politician, born 1957) (born 1957), Russian politician and senator from Amur Oblast
- Aleksandr Suvorov (ship), Russian river cruise ship

== See also ==
- Alexandru Suvorov (born 1987), Moldovan footballer
