= Naryshkin family =

Russian noble family

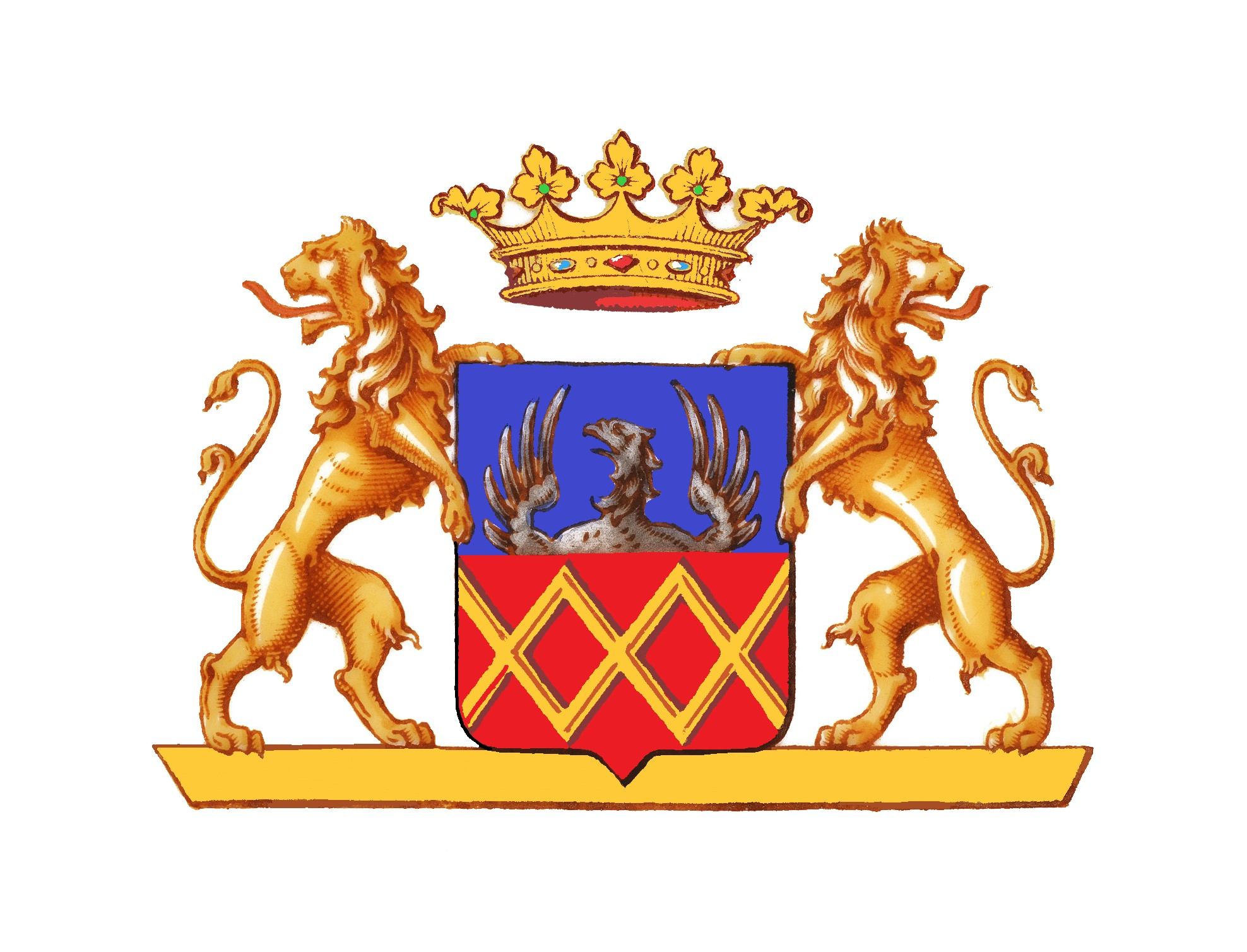
Arms of the Naryshkin family

The House of Naryshkin (Russian: Нарышкины) is a noble Russian boyar family of Crimean Tatar descent, going back to a certain Mordko Kurbat Naryshko, who moved to Moscow in the 15th century. It became allied to the ruling house in 1671 when Natalya Naryshkina (daughter of Kirill Poluektovich Naryshkin) married Alexis of Russia, later becoming the mother of Peter the Great. The Naryshkin family was persecuted under the regency of Tsarevna Sophia Alekseyevna of Russia, but were then highly favoured by Peter and his descendants and played a major part in Russian life.

== Streltsy revolt against Naryshkin family ==
During the Streltsy uprising, soldiers of the Streltsy staged a revolt against the Naryshkin family (the relatives of Peter's mother, who had assumed actual power). Their uprising was crushed and their unit were forcibly disbanded by the Tsar, with hundreds of them executed or deported.

== Other notable members ==
- Kirill Alexeyevich Naryshkin (1670–1723), Commandant of Pskov and of Dorpat 1704 – 1710, commandant of Saint Petersburg 1710 – 1716, governor of Moscow 1716–1719
- Alexis Vasilievich Naryshkin (1742–1800), chamberlain from 1773, diplomat, scholar, friend of Denis Diderot (offering lodging in his house during Diderot's stay in Saint Petersburg, at Place Saint-Isaac, n° 8)
- Alexander Lvovich Naryshkin (1760–1826), friend of Paul I of Russia, who called him his 'uncle'; he served simultaneously as grand chamberlain, chancellor and grand marshal of the nobility; he also served for a long time as head of the theatres and attracted the top artists from Europe (particularly from France) to Russia.
- Maria Naryshkina (1779–1854), née Princess Maria Svyatopolk-Chetvertinskaya, mistress of Alexander I of Russia
- Lev Kirillovich Naryshkin, Russian ambassador
- Lev Alexandrovich Naryshkin (1785–1846), Russian lieutenant-general, fought in the Napoleonic Wars
- Kirill Alexandrovich Naryshkin, member of the State Council (1834)
- Alexander Alexeyevich Naryshkin (1839–1916), member of the State Council (1906)

== Gallery ==
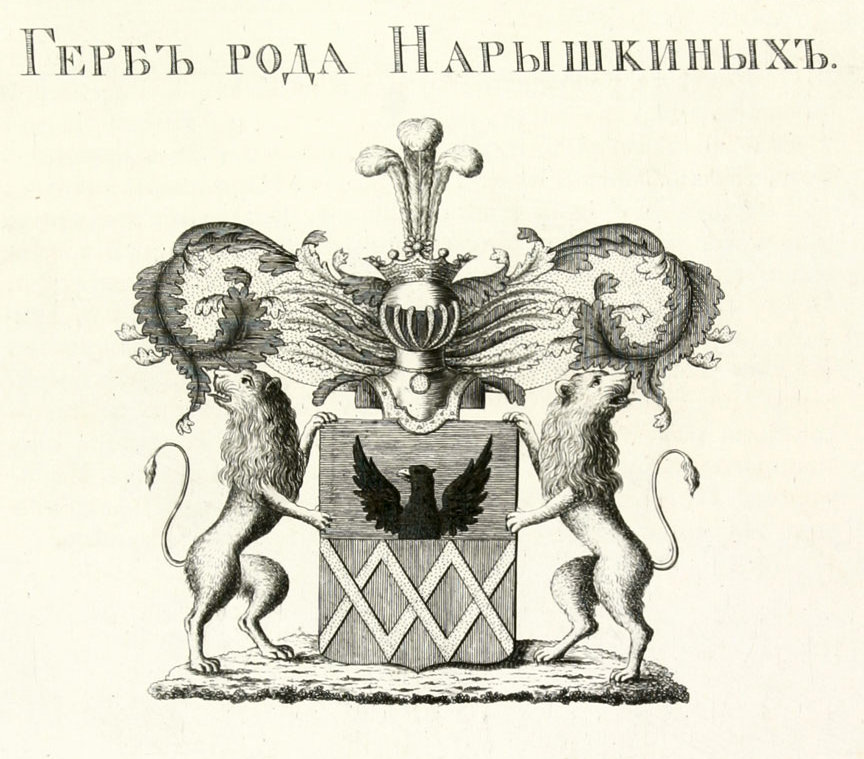
Family coat of arms

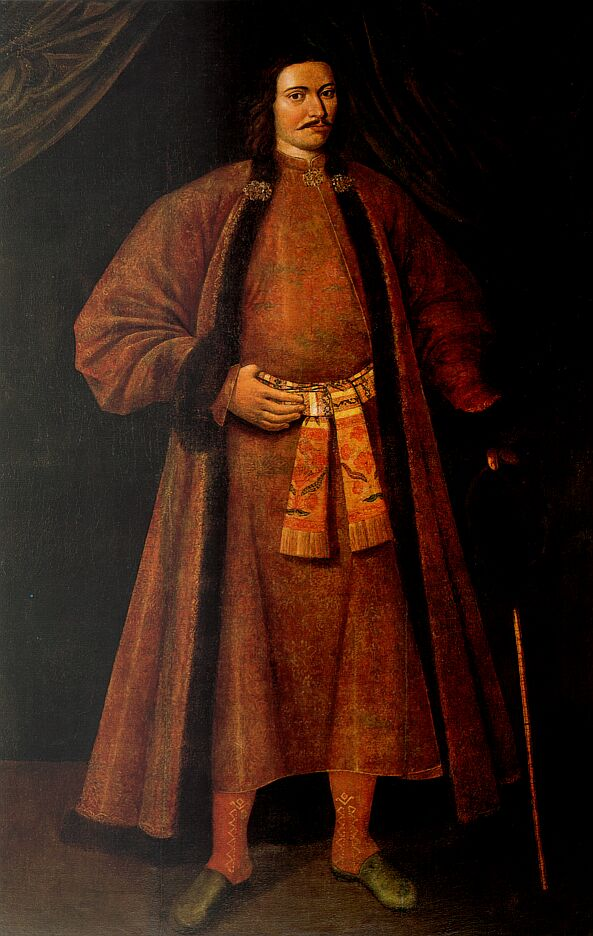
Lev Kirillovich Naryshkin

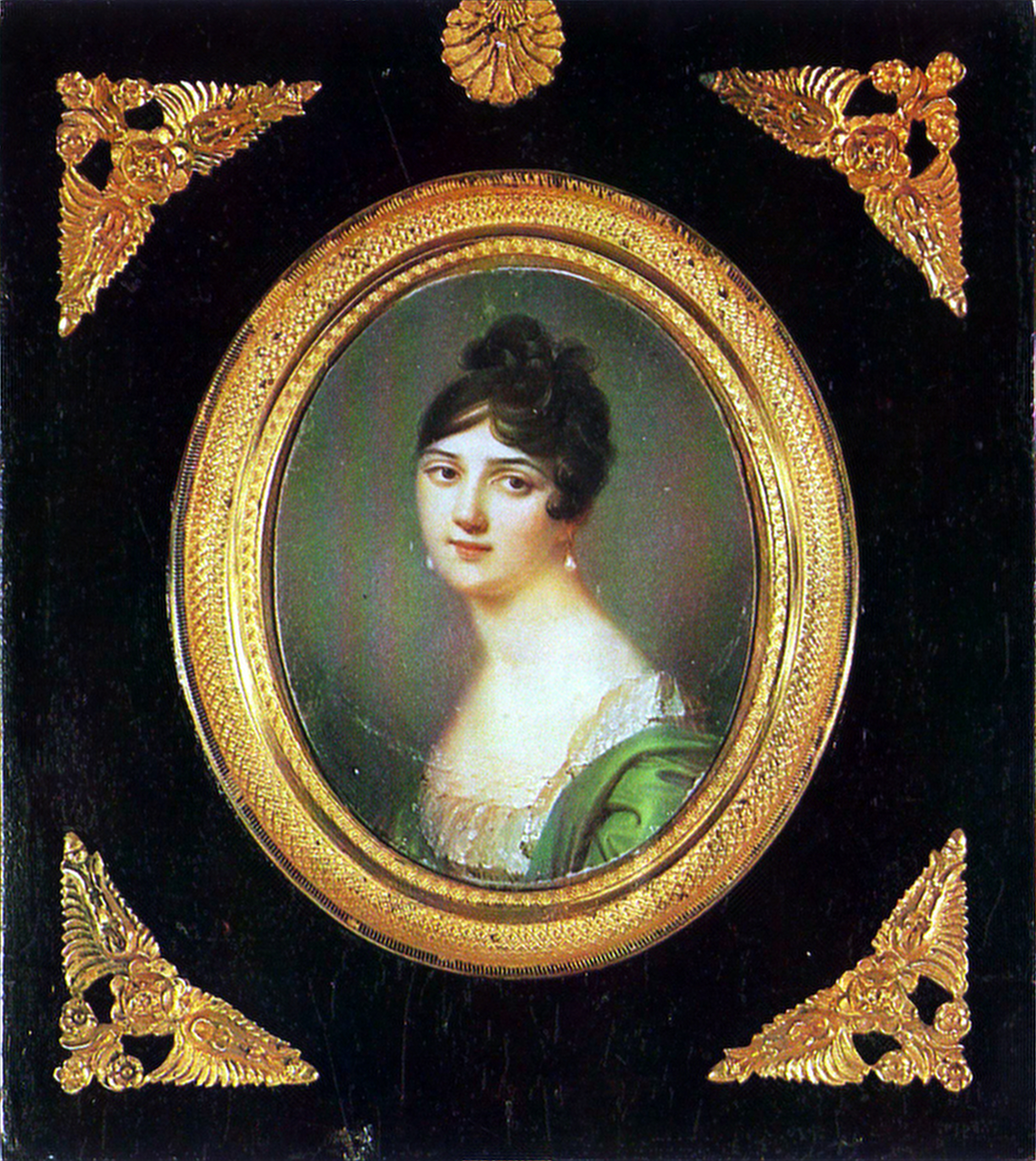
Maria Naryshkina, mistress of Alexander I of Russia by Domenico Bossi

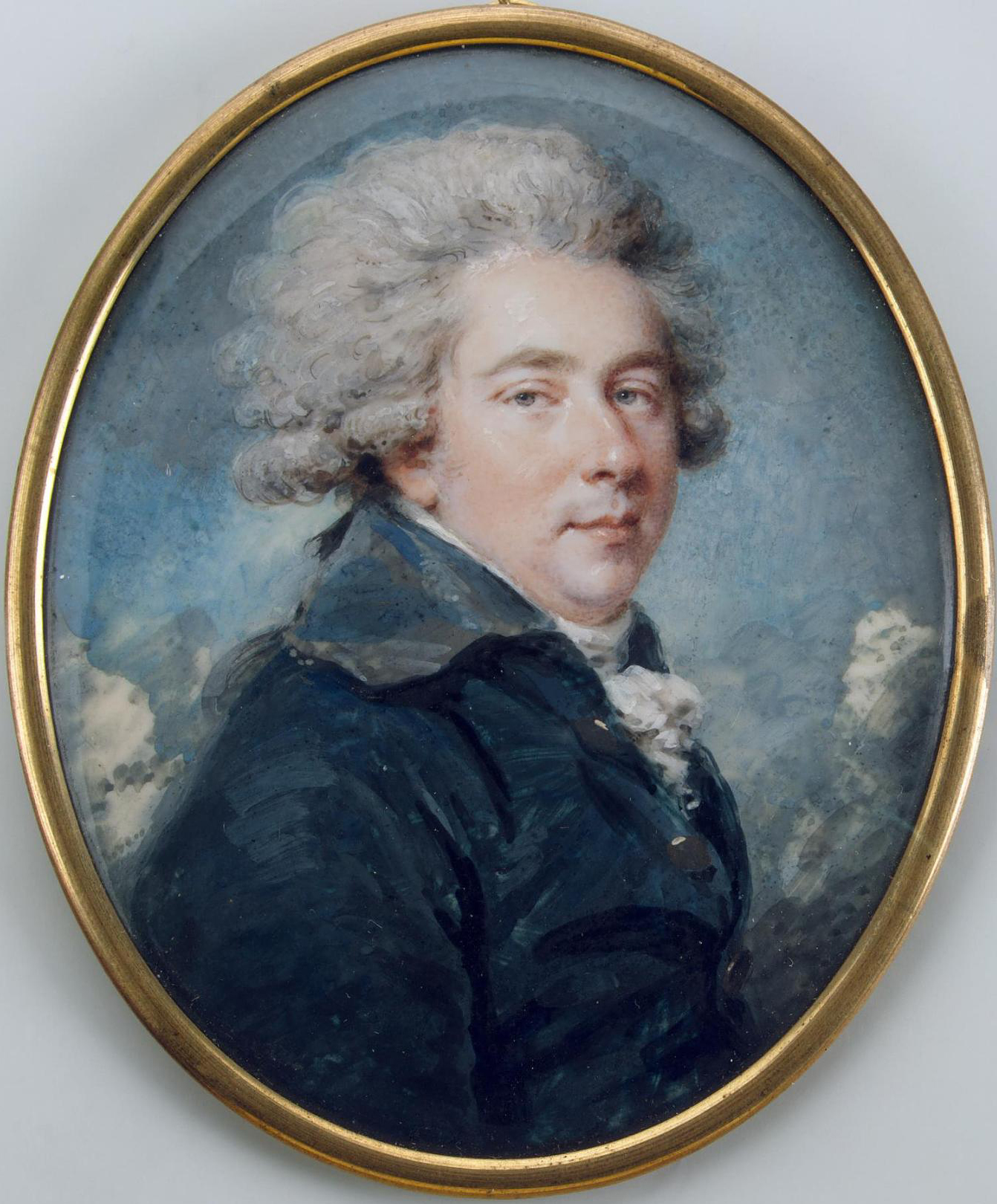
Aleksandr Naryshkin by Augustin-Christian Ritt

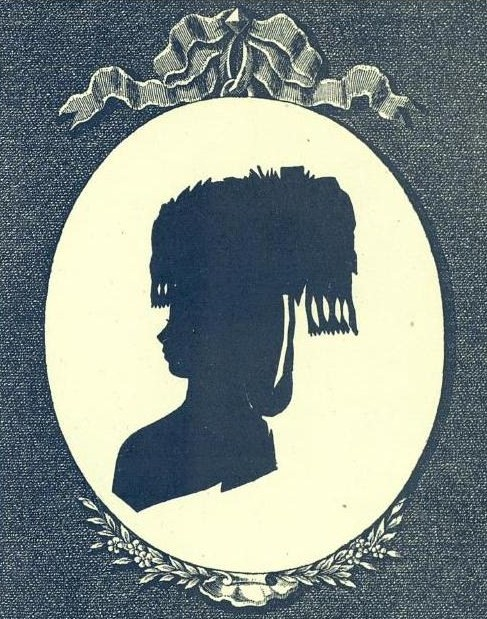
Silhouette of Maria Lvovna Naryshkina

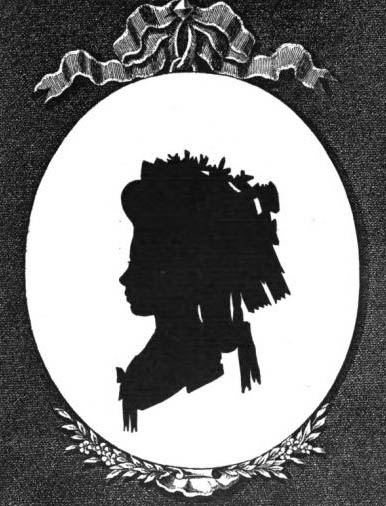
Silhouette of Anna Lvovna Naryshkina

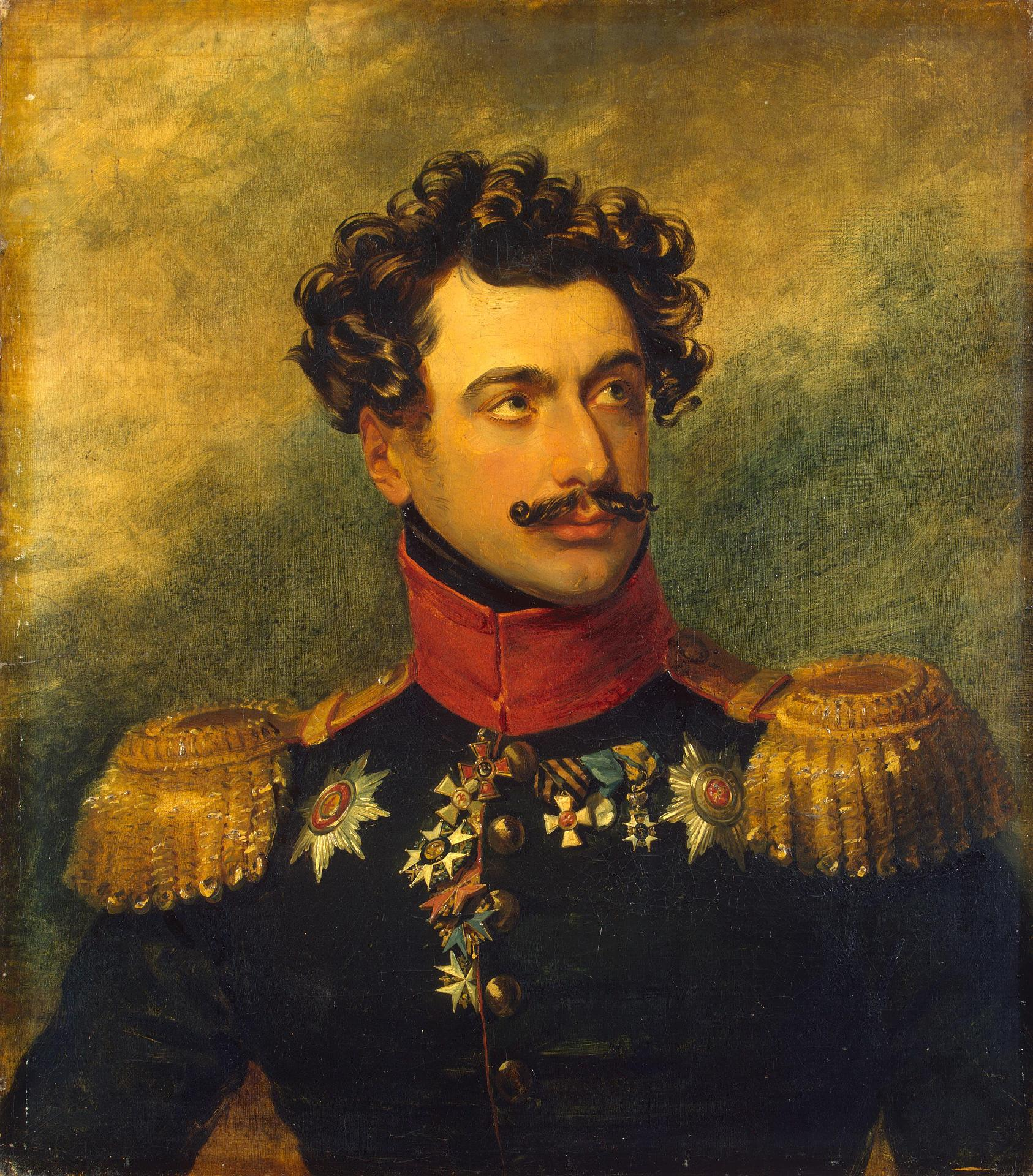
Lev Naryshkin by George Dawe

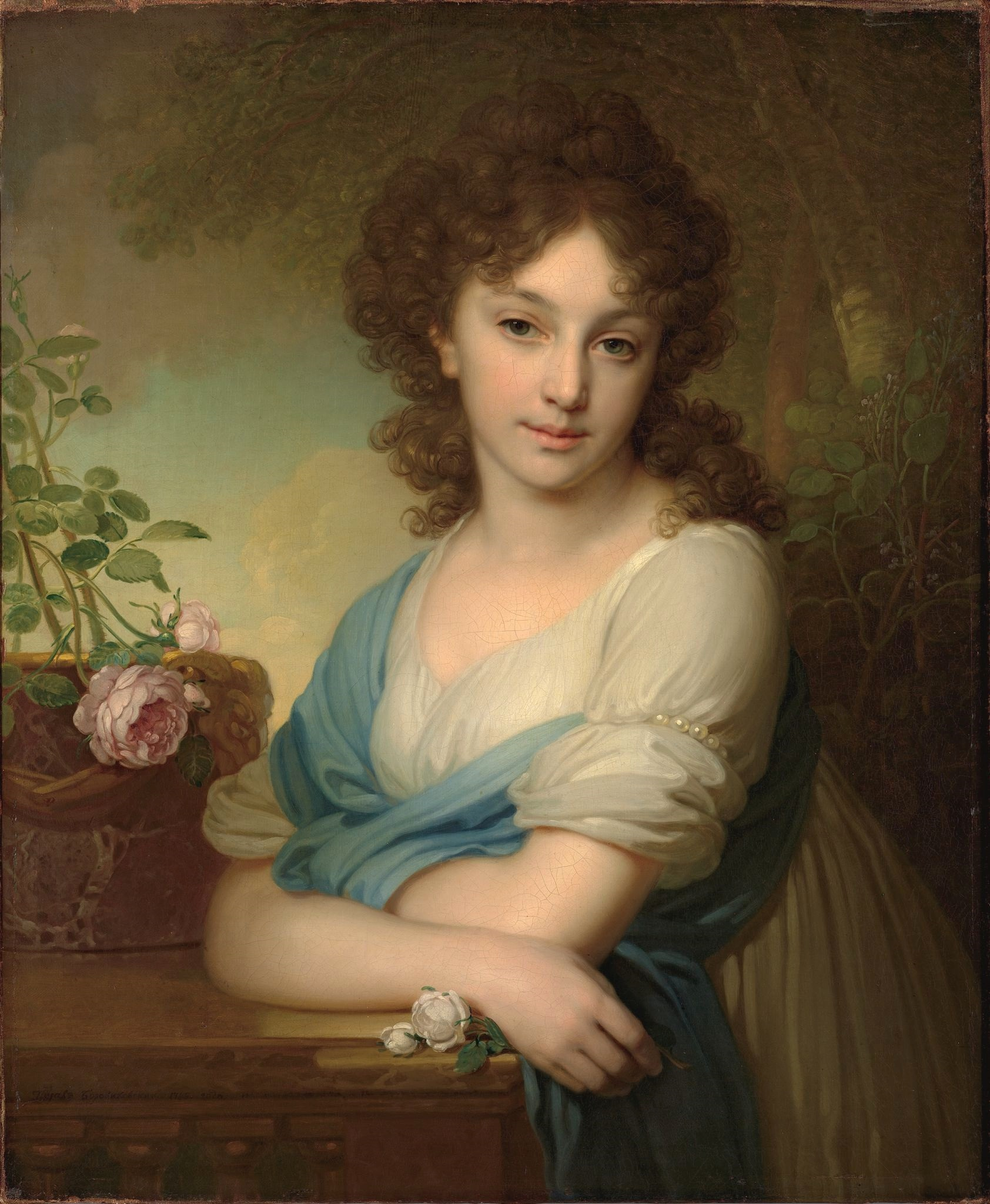
Elena Aleksandrovna Naryshkina by Vladimir Borovikovsky

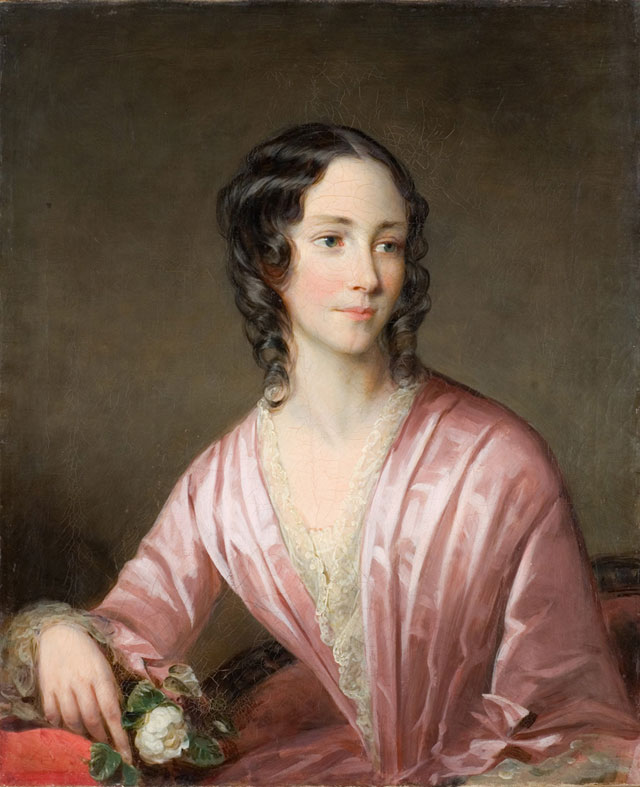
Zinaida Ivanovna Naryshkina by Christina Robertson

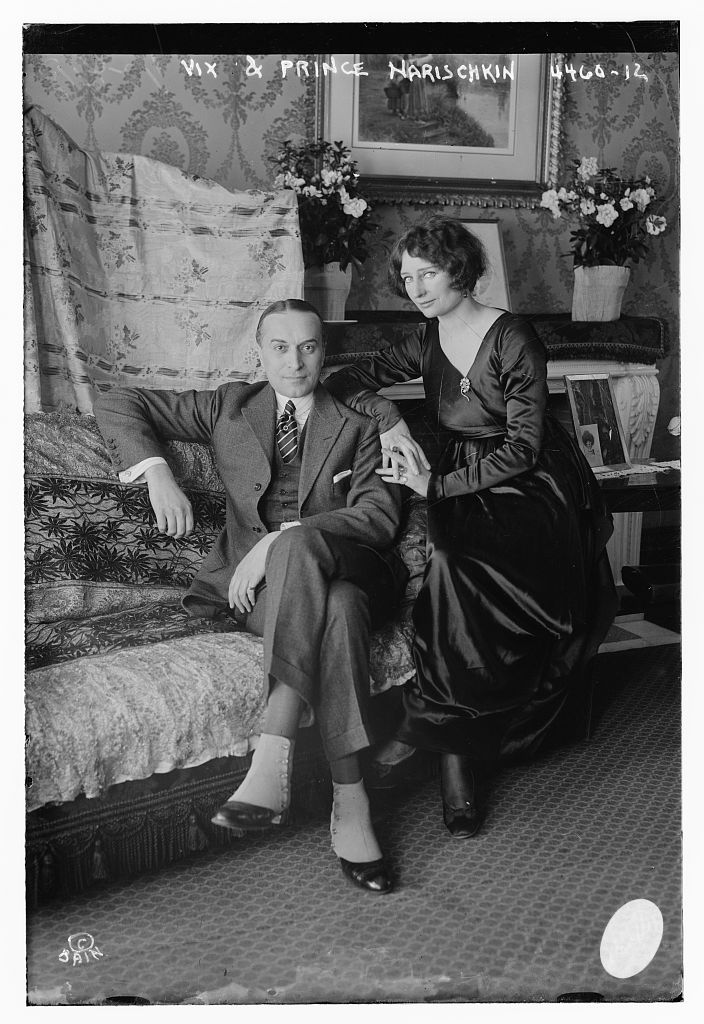
Vix and Prince Naryschkin in 1917

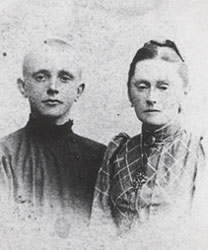
Alexandra Dmitrievna Naryshkina with son Alexander
