= Suvorovo (disambiguation) =

Suvorovo is a town in northeastern Bulgaria.

Suvorovo may also refer to the following places:

- Suvorovo Municipality, Bulgaria
- Suvorovo Microdistrict, Moskovsky District, Kaliningrad, Russia
- Suvorovo, Belgorod Oblast, Russia
- Suvorovo, Gryazovetsky District, Vologda Oblast, Russia
- Suvorovo, Babayevsky District, Vologda Oblast, Russia
- Berezanka, Ukraine, called Suvorove (Russian transliteration: Suvorovo) between 1914 and 2023
- Katlabuh, Ukraine, called Suvorove (Russian transliteration: Suvorovo) between 1941 and 2024
- Ștefan Vodă, Moldova, known as Suvorovo during the Soviet period until 1990

== See also ==
- Suvorovo culture, or the Suvorovo group, a Copper Age culture 4500 BC – 4100 BC.
