= Konderski coat of arms =

Polish coat of arms

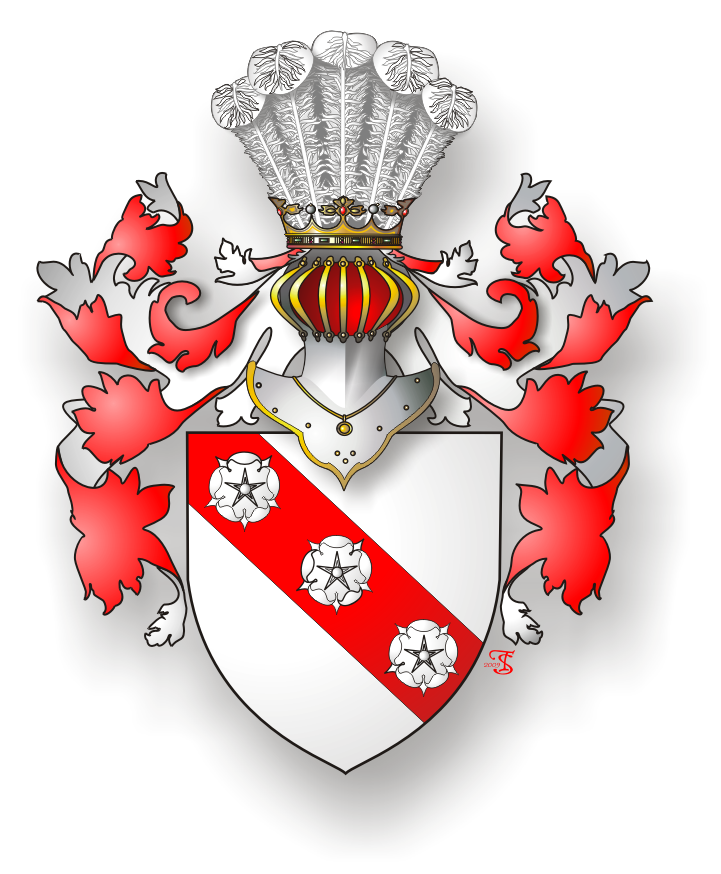
Coat of arms Konderski

Konderski is a Polish coat of arms.

== Blazon ==
Argent, a bend Gules, with three roses Argent.

The helm crowned with Polish nobleman crown. Crest out of a crown - five ostrich feathers.

Mantling Gules doubled Argent.

== The earliest mention ==
The coat of arms was granted at the coronation diet in 1764, for the Jewish brothers Joseph and Adam Konderski, former followers of Frankism. Confirmed by the Diet in 1775 and 14 June 1782.

Also the coat of arms of the related families of Kondek (Poland) and Konder (Saxon).

== Names ==
- Konderski, Kondek, Konder

== Sources ==
- Juliusz Karol Ostrowski, Księga herbowa rodów polskich- Warsaw 1897–1906, vol.2, p. 146 (pl)
- Tomasz Lenczewski, Nobilitacja neofitów za Stanisława Augusta in: Żydzi polscy, an extra in Rzeczpospolita of 27 May 2008 (pl)
- Tadeusz Gajl, Herbarz polski od średniowiecza do XX wieku- L & L, Gdańsk 2007, ISBN 978-83-60597-10-1 (pl)
