= Lev Naryshkin =

Russian aristocrat

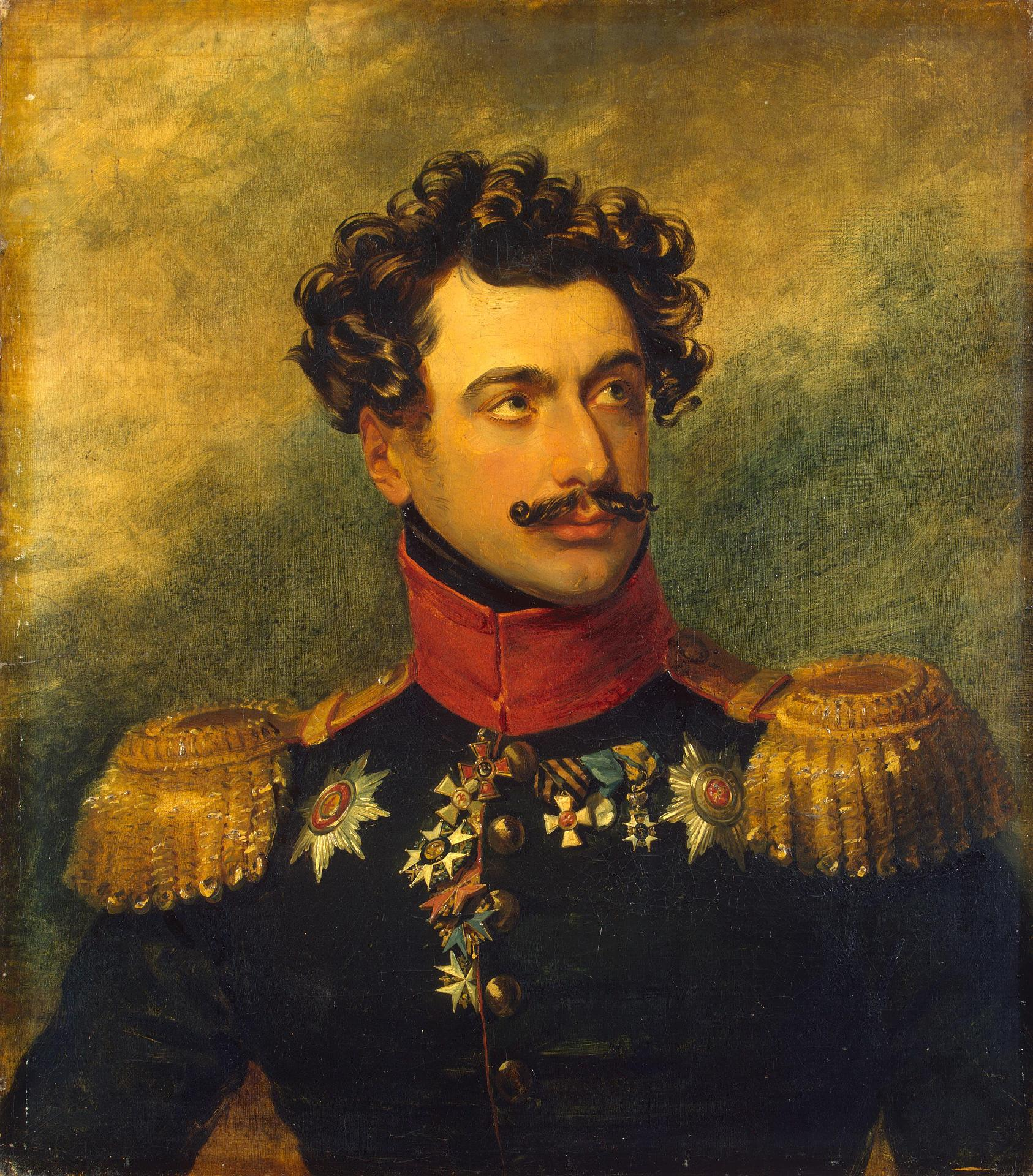
Portrait by George Dawe

Lev Alexandrovich Naryshkin (Russian: Лев Александрович Нарышкин; also known as Léon Narychkine) (5 February 1785 – 1846, Naples) was a Russian Imperial aristocrat who fought in the Napoleonic Wars.

== Biography ==
He was the son of Alexander Lvovich Naryshkin and his wife Maria Alexeyevna Senyavina, daughter of Admiral Alexei Senyavin. This made Lev brother to Elena Aleksandrovna Naryshkina and first cousin to Prince Mikhail Semyonovich Vorontsov, who fought in the Napoleonic Wars and the conquest of the Caucasus. Naryshkin was educated at home by private tutors under the French abbé Nicol. He entered the court as a page and became a chamberlain on 15 March 1799.

He was made a lieutenant on 22 January 1803 in the Preobrazhensky regiment, then a cavalry captain on 13 February 1807 in the Hussar Regiment of the Imperial Guard. He fought at Gutstadt, Heilsberg and Friedland, where he was wounded in the arm and decorated with a gold sabre. He was demobilised and returned to his work as a chamberlain at the court.

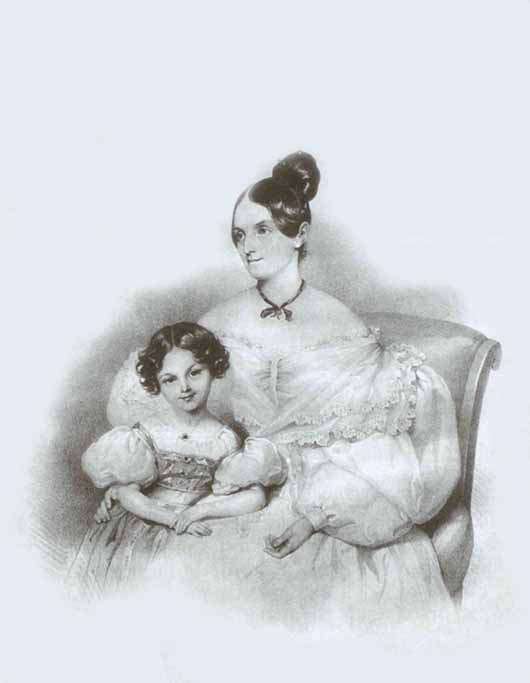
Lithograph of Olga Potocka Naryshkina with their daughter, Sofia

The French invasion of Russia forced Naryshkin back into the army as a cavalry captain in the 11th Izyumovsky Hussars Regiment, and he faced the Grande Armée at the battle of Ostrovno, near Smolensk, on 25 and 26 July 1812, then at Borodino, where he was wounded in the head. He then fought under General Ferdinand von Wintzingerode, and they were captured by the French in September 1812. He was freed by Cossacks near Vitebsk and rejoined his regiment, in which he became colonel on 19 November 1812, in recognition of his bravery at Berezina. He then fought in the battles near Kalisz and helped push the French back into Prussia and Saxony. He was made a major general on 18 January 1814. He then fought under von Wintzingerode's orders again in the Army of the North and faced Napoleon's army at Großbeeren and Dennewitz on 6 September 1813, after which he received the Order of Saint George, fourth class, on 9 October 1813. He also received the Order of Saint Vladimir, third class after the Battle of the Nations, in which he was wounded. He then commanded a Cossack brigade in Holland and northern France, serving in the forces occupying France from 1815 to 1818. He then returned to Russia and civilian life in 1824.

He became squire to the court, and in 1843 was appointed to the personal staff of the Tsar. On 6 December 1843, he was made adjutant general, and in 1844 lieutenant general.

Late in life, he went to Naples for his health and died there. He was buried in the Saint-Lazare cemetery at the Alexander Nevsky Lavra.

He married Countess Olga Potocka (1802–1861), daughter of Count Stanisław Szczęsny Potocki and Zofia Potocka, with whom he had a daughter, Sofia (1829–1894) who married Count Pyotr Pavlovich Shuvalov in 1846.
