= Aleksandr Naryshkin =

Russian noble

Alexander Lvovich Naryshkin
- Александр Львович Нарышкин
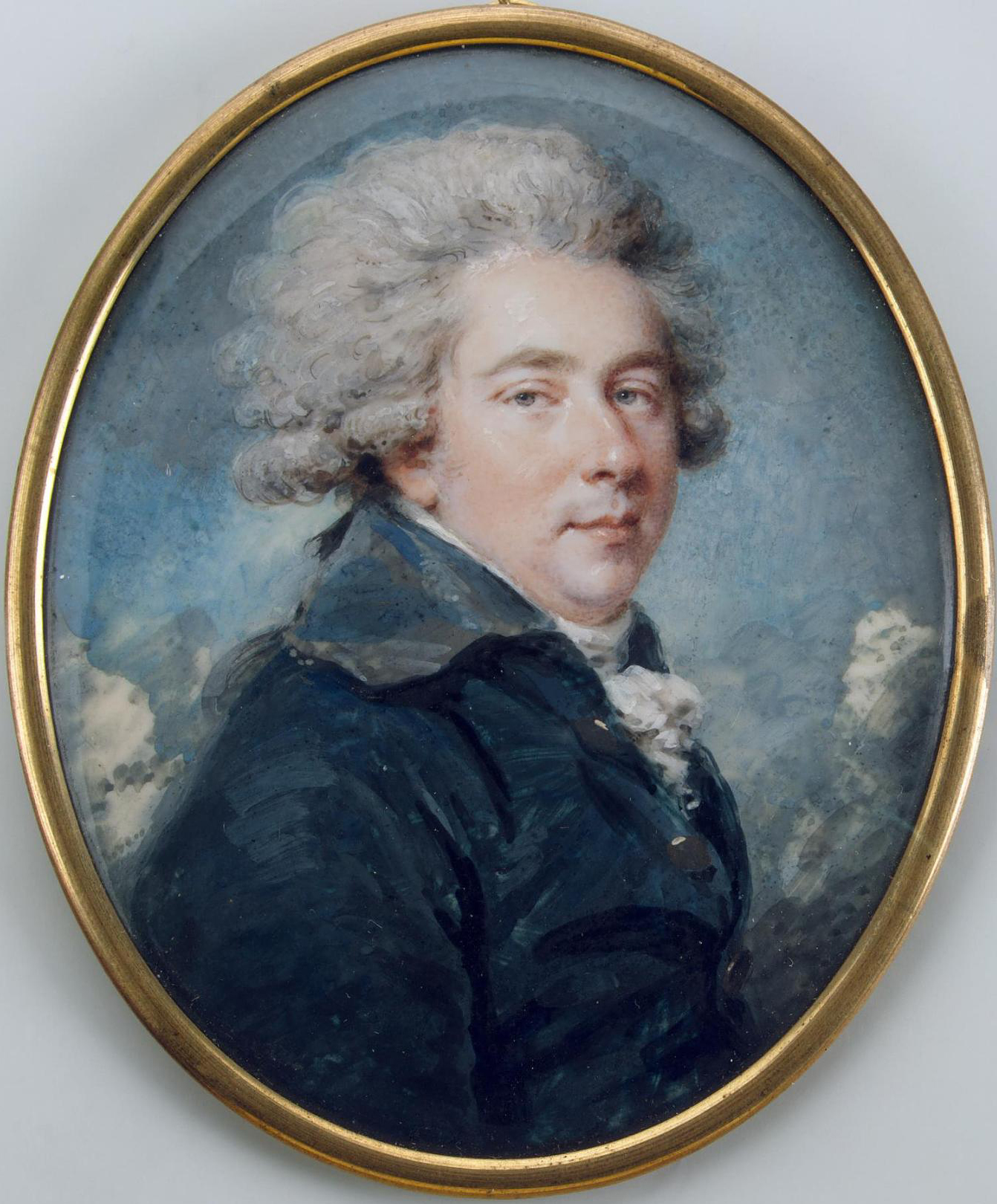
- Portrait of Naryshkin by Augustin-Christian Ritt
- Born: 19 December 1788
- Died: 10 December 1865
- Known for: Director of the Imperial Theatres
- Spouse: Maria Alekseevna Naryshkina

Alexander Lvovich Naryshkin (Russian: Александр Лвович Нарышкин) (14 April 1760 – 21 January 1826) was a Russian noble of the Naryshkin family. He was the director of the Imperial Theatres from 1799 to 1819 and Marshal of Nobility of Saint-Petersburg from 1818 to 1826. He and his brother were famous for their lavish parties in Saint-Petersburg.

== Life ==
Aleksandr Naryshkin was born on 14 April 1760 into the Naryshkin family. After being tutored at home, he embarked on a Grand Tour, as was often done by upper-class young European men as a rite of passage. Upon his return, he entered the Izmailovsky Life Guards regiment, where he rose to the rank of lieutenant captain.

In 1778, he was granted the position of chamber-junker and began building his career at the Imperial Court. In 1785, he was promoted to chamberlain and made friends with the heir to the throne, Catherine the Great's son Paul. After the accession to the throne of Paul I in 1797, he was awarded the Order of St. Anna of the 1st degree, and shortly after in 1798 he was awarded the Order of St. Alexander Nevsky and granted the position of chief marshal.

In 1799, he was appointed director of the Imperial Theatres.

In 1812, he became a member of a special committee responsible for the management of all St. Petersburg and Moscow theaters. In 1815, he accompanied Empress Elizaveta Alekseevna on her trip to the Congress of Vienna.

In 1819, he resigned from his post as director of the Imperial Theatres. He was then an honorary member of the Imperial Academy of Arts.

In 1820, he went abroad and lived the rest of his life in Paris, where he died of dropsy on 21 January 1826.

== Public Image ==
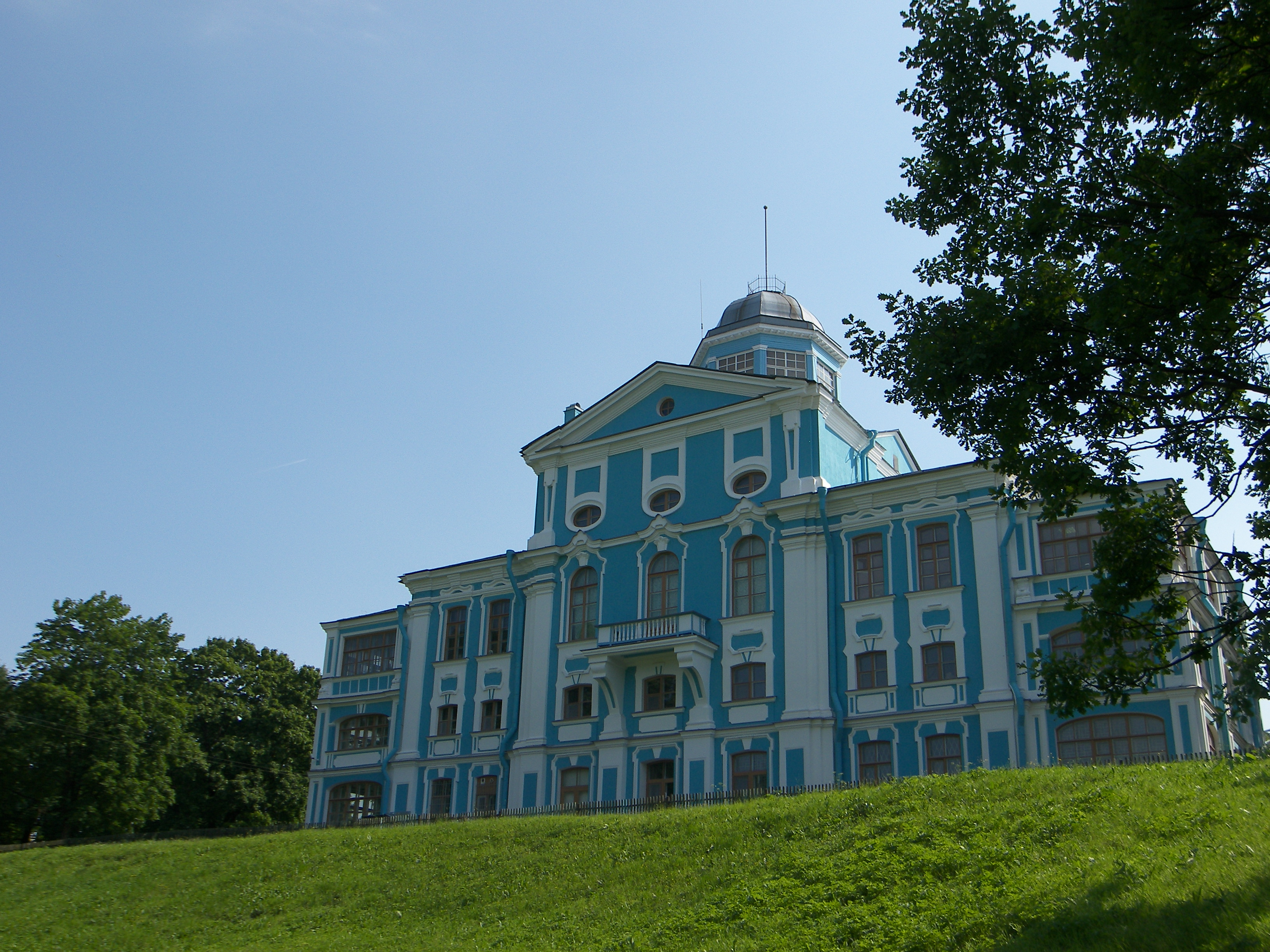
The Bellevue near Saint Petersburg

Following several generations of the Naryshkins, Alexander Lvovich was known as a bon vivant, an epicurean and yet forever without money and saddled with debt. At the Bellevue country estate, he hosted the entire Petersburg society, including Alexander I, who referred to Naryshkin as his cousin. In the book "Ten Years' Exile", describing concerts of horn music at Naryshkin's estate, Madame de Staël characterized the owner as "an amiable and courteous man," but inclined to seek entertainment not in books, but in a noisy company: surrounded by 20 people, he imagines himself in "philosophical seclusion".

== Family ==
From his marriage to Maria Alekseevna Naryshkina, daughter of admiral Alexei Senyavin, he had four children:

- Lev Naryshkin (1785—1846), lieutenant-general in the War of 1812 and acquaintance of Alexander Pushkin in Odessa
- Elena Aleksandrovna Naryshkina (1785—1855), maid of honour and mother of Alexander Arkadyevich Suvorov
- Kirill Alexandrovich Naryshkin (1786—1838), member of the State Council
- Maria(?-1800), died in childhood

Along with many members of his family, Alexander Naryshkin was buried in Alexander Nevsky Lavra.
