= Georgii Suvorov =

Russian mathematician

Georgii Dmitrievic Suvorov
- Born: May 19, 1919; Saratov, Russia
- Died: October 11, 1984 (aged 65); Donetsk, Ukraine
- Citizenship: Russian
- Education: Tomsk University
- Scientific career
- Fields: Mathematician

Georgii Dmitrievic Suvorov (19 May 1919 – 12 October 1984) was a Soviet mathematician who made major contributions to the function theory and topology.

== Biography ==
G.D. Suvorov was born on 19 May 1919 in Saratov. He graduated in mathematics from the Tomsk University in 1941. From 1941 to 1946, he served in the Soviet Army. For his military service, he was awarded the medals "For the Defense of Moscow" (1944), "For the Victory over Germany in the Great Patriotic War of 1941–1945" (1946) and "For the Victory over Japan" (1946). He was demobilized with the rank of lieutenant. After demobilization, he taught for several months at the Stalin Pedagogical Institute in Donesk.

He then returned to the Tomsk University to research under the supervision of Pavel Parfenevich Kufarev (1909–1968). Between 1951 and 1966, Suvorov worked as an assistant, then lecturer and finally became professor in the Faculty of Mechanics and Mathematics. Finally in 1961 he defended his D.Sc. dissertation entitled "Main properties of certain classes of topological mappings of plane domains with variable boundaries." In 1965, he was elected to Ukrainian SSR branch of the Academy of Sciences of the Soviet Union.

In 1966, he became the Head of the Department of the Theory of Functions at the Donetsk Computing Centre, which later became the Institute of Applied Mathematics and Mechanics of the Ukrainian SSR Academy of Sciences.

G.D. Suvorov died on 11 October 1984 in Donetsk, Ukraine.

== Works ==
G.D. Suvorov was the founder of a new branch of function theory concerned with the study of classes of plane and spatial mappings with bounded Dirichlet integral and of a new trend in mathematics at the border of the theory of functions and general topology that deals with the topological aspects of the boundary correspondence in a conformal mapping.

G.D. Suvorov made major contributions on the theory of topological and metric mappings on 2-dimensional space. Later at Donetsk he extended Lavrent'ev's work on stability and differentiable function theorems, to more general classes of transformations. Suvorov introduced new methods to help in the understanding of metric properties of mappings with bounded Dirichlet integral.

G.D. Suvorov and Oleg V. Ivanov collaborated on a number of papers culminating in a joint monograph “Complete lattices of conformally invariant compactifications of a domain”.

G.D. Suvorov published his authoritative monograph "Families of plane topological mappings" in 1965. He published in 1981 a monograph "The metric theory of prime ends and boundary properties of plane mappings with bounded Dirichlet integrals. (Metricheskaya teoriya prostykh kontsov i granichnye svojstva ploskikh otobrazhenij s ogranichennymi integralami Dirikhle). (Russian)". Two of his monographs were posthumously published in 1984 "The generalized "length and area principle" in mapping theory. (Obobshchennyj “printsip dliny i ploshchadi” v teorii otobrazheniya). (Russian)" and in 1985 his monograph "Prime ends and sequences of plane mappings" develops the topics from his two earlier monographs.

== Bibliography ==
- "List of publications of Georgii Dmitrievich Suvorov". www.mathnet.ru. 17 January 2019.
- Georgii Suvorov at zbMATH
