= Suvorovo, Gryazovetsky District, Vologda Oblast =

Suvorovo Суворово
- Village
- Location within Vologda Oblast Location within Russia
- Coordinates: 58°58′N 40°26′E
- Country: Russia
- Region: Vologda Oblast
- District: Gryazovetsky District
- Time zone: UTC+3:00

Suvorovo (Russian: Суворово) is a rural locality (a village) in Komyanskoye Rural Settlement, Gryazovetsky District, Vologda Oblast, Russia. The population was 6 as of 2002.

== Geography ==
Suvorovo is located 31 km northeast of Gryazovets (the district's administrative centre) by road. Yevsyukovo is the nearest rural locality.
