= Suvorovo, Belgorod Oblast =

Suvorovo Суворово
- Selo
- Location within Belgorod Oblast Location within Russia
- Coordinates: 51°05′N 36°32′E
- Country: Russia
- Region: Belgorod Oblast
- District: Prokhorovsky District
- Time zone: UTC+3:00

Suvorovo (Russian: Суворово) is a rural locality (a selo) in Prokhorovsky District, Belgorod Oblast, Russia. The population was 89 as of 2010. There is 1 street.

== Geography ==
Suvorovo is located 18 km northwest of Prokhorovka (the district's administrative centre) by road. Kartashyovka is the nearest rural locality.
