= Suvorov (inhabited locality) =

Suvorov (Russian: Суворов) is the name of several inhabited localities in Russia.

== Modern localities ==
Urban localities

- Suvorov, Tula Oblast, a town in Suvorovsky District of Tula Oblast

Rural localities

- Suvorov, Rostov Oblast, a khutor in Nikolayevskoye Rural Settlement of Konstantinovsky District in Rostov Oblast

== Alternative names ==
- Suvorov, alternative name of Suvorovo, a selo in Suvorovsky Rural Administrative Okrug of Pogarsky District in Bryansk Oblast; 52°31′N 33°16′E
