= Arkadi Suvorov =

Russian general (1784–1811)

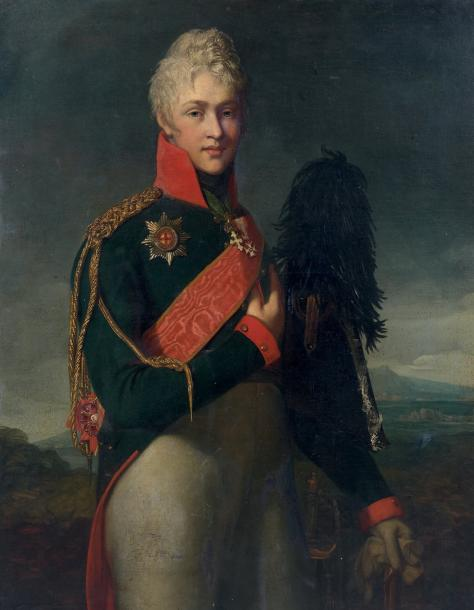
Portrait by Jean-Laurent Mosnier

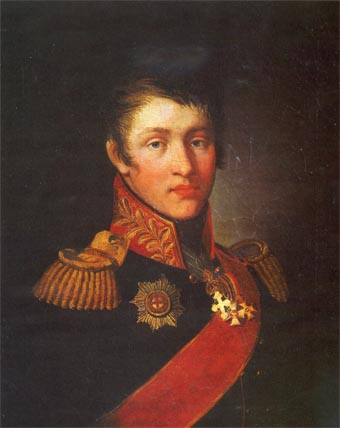
Portrait by an unknown painter

Arkadi or Arkady Alexandrovich Suvorov (Russian: Аркадий Александрович Суворов, romanized: Arkadiy Aleksandrovič Suvorov; 4 (15) August 1784 – 25 April 1811), Count Rymniksky and Prince Italiysky, was a Russian general. A son of Alexander Suvorov, he rose to the rank of lieutenant general.

== Life ==
He fought in the Italian and Swiss expedition (1799–1800). After his father's death, Arkadi married Elena Aleksandrovna Naryshkina (1785–1855). He fought in the wars with France in 1807, in Austria in 1809 and in Turkey from 1810 to 1811. He commanded 9th Infantry Division, stationed in Ukraine, from 1807 onwards. He was killed while crossing the Râmnicul Sărat river on 13 April 1811, though the story stating that he was drowned trying to save his coachman originated with his biographer E. Fuks and is not supported by his memoirs and documentary sources. It is, however, supported by Aleksey Yermolov's memoirs, as well as by the military historian Christopher Duffy. The Râmnicul Sărat—the site of a battle in which his father won one of his greatest victories (see Battle of Rymnik). Arkadi is buried at the New Jerusalem Monastery. He had two daughters—Mary and Barbara—and two sons—Alexander and Constantine.
