= Tomasz Lenczewski =

Tomasz Bogumil Lenczewski (born 28 December 1960 in Lodz), is a Polish heraldist, genealogist, canonist and second-hand bookseller. He is the continuator of the genealogies of the titled houses of Poland (following in the steps of Count Jerzy Seweryn Dunin-Borkowski and Edward Borowski) and the author of several score articles in the field of contemporary Polish history and studies related to history (chiefly in genealogy and biography) some which have been published in the following periodicals:

- Zeszyty Historyczne (The Historical Journal),
- Karta (The Historical page),
- Mars,
- Genealogisches Handbuch des Adels und Rzeczpospolita.(in German)

== Education ==
During the years 1981-1987, he studied in the department of canon law of the Akademia Teologii Katolickiej (Academy of Catholic Theology) where he obtained his Master's degree.

== The Polish-South African Friendship Society ==
Tomasz Lenczewski was the founding member of the Towarzystwo Przyjaźni Polsko’Południowo-Afrykańskiej (The Polish-South African Friendship Society). During the years of 1991-1992 he was also the vice-president of the society.

== Publications ==
He is the author of:

- 1997: “Genealogie rodów utytułowanych w Polsce, t. 1 (The Genealogy of the Titled Houses of Poland, vol. 1), (‘Adiutor’ publishing house)
- 2005: “Russoccy herbu Zadora: zarys monografii rodu’ (The Russockis, blazon Zadora: an introduction to a monograph of the family), (‘Adiutor’ publishing house)
- 2016: "Herold (1930-1936), edited and published by Ludgard Count Grocholski: A Bibliography. (Antykwariat Logos)

He is the co-author of:

- 2004: "Genealogien kurländisch-ritterschaftlicher Geschlechter die bisher weder im "Genealogischen Handbuch der Baltischen Ritterschaften, Teil Kurland", noch im "Genealogischen Handbuch des Adels" erschienen sind" (Vereinigten Kurländischen Stiftungen im Auftrag der Kurländischen Ritterschaft)
- 2007: "Szylchra Trzebińscy z Trzebini herbu Abdank Odmienny : szkic genealogii rodu" (Oficyna Wydawnicza „Adiutor”)

He is the author of such articles as:

- Nobilitacje neofitów za Stanisława Augusta, (The ennoblement of Jewish Frankists during the reign of Stanislas Augustus), Rzeczpospolita, 26.05.2008
- W szeregach szlachty (In the ranks of the nobility), Rzeczpospolita, 07.07.2008
- Mariaże herbów i kont (Marriages of aristocrats and the wealthy), Rzeczpospolita, 20.07.2008
- The Career of a Megalomaniac (Count Mieczysław Dunin-Borkowski, alias Giuseppe Newlin (1905-1971), The Past and Remembrance. Bulletin of the Rada Ochrony Pamięci, Walk i Męczęństwa (The Council for the Preservation of Remembrance, Struggle and Martyrdom), nr 38, January–December 2011, pp 277–87

== Private life ==
He has two sons:

- Mikolaj Bonaventura, born in 1983, a graduate of the Wojskowa Akademia Techniczna (Military Technical Academy)
- Olgierd Aleksander, born in 1992

== Sources ==
- Woreyd Almanach, Warszawa 2002, p. 231
- Narbutt, Maja "Sekrety i kłamstwa: z Tomaszem Lenczewskim, historykiem i genealogiem rozmawia" (Secrets and Lies: an interview with Tomasz Lenczewski, historian and genealogist by Maja Narbutt) in: Rzeczpospolita; nr 139; 16 June 2007, p. A13 (Plus Minus)
