= Alexander Arkadyevich Suvorov =

Russian general and politician (1804–1882)

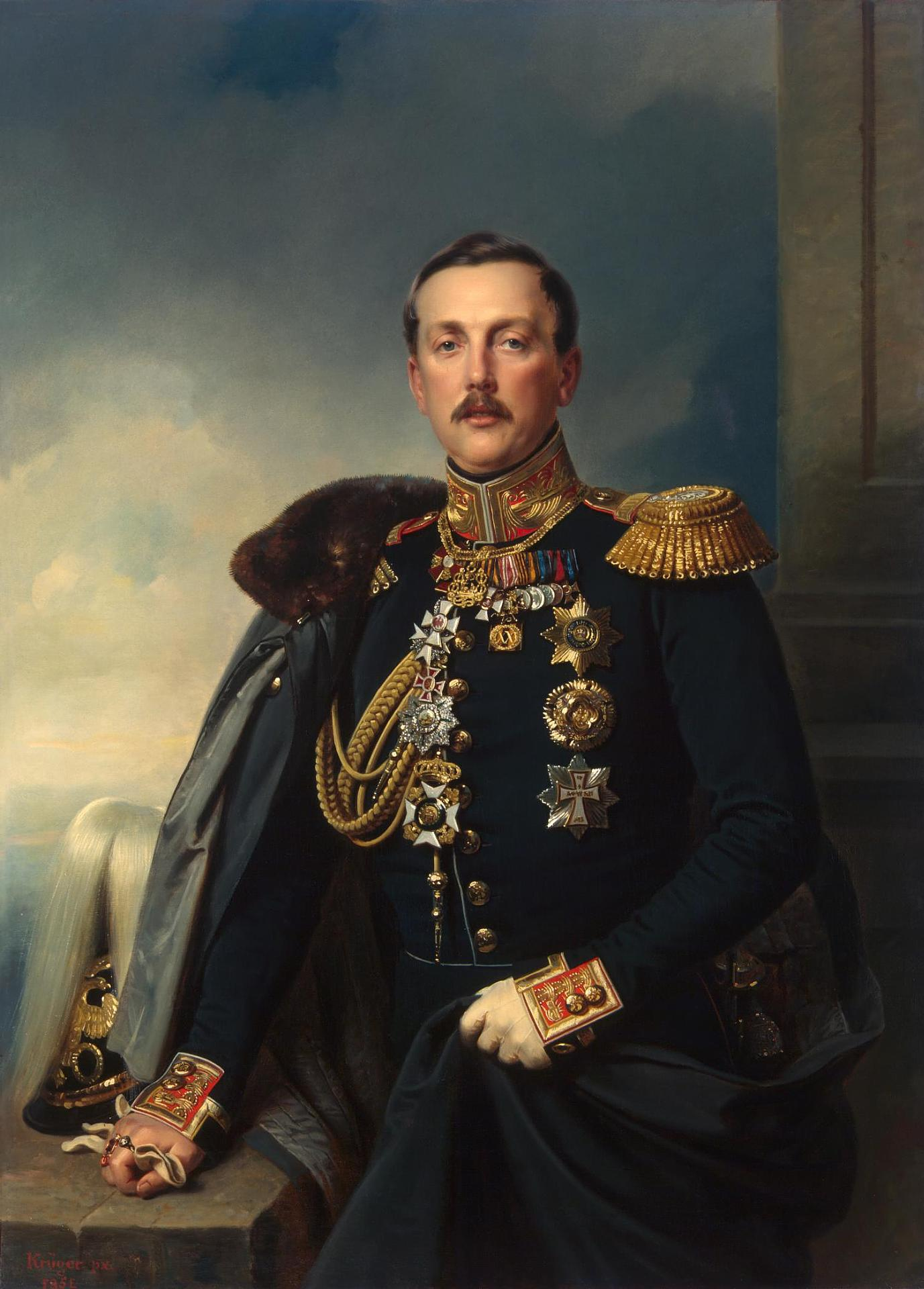
Portrait of Alexander Arkadyevich Suvorov, 1851 – oil on canvas by Franz Kruger, 138 x 100 cm, Germany

Alexander Arkadyevich Suvorov, Prince Italiysky, Count Rymniksky (Russian: Алекса́ндр Арка́дьевич Суво́ров; 13 June 1804 – 12 February 1882) was a Russian general, diplomat and politician.

== Life ==
=== Education ===
His parents were Arkadi Suvorov and his wife Elena Aleksandrovna Naryshkina, making him the grandson of Alexander Suvorov. His father was drowned in 1811 when Alexander was still a child. He was then sent to the Jesuit college in Saint Petersburg, where he was raised (as was the fashion) alongside other sons of Russian aristocrats. Three years later, due to a change in his attitude towards the Jesuits, his uncle Cyril A. Naryshkin (who had himself been taught by the Jesuits) withdrew Alexander from the school and educated him himself, inviting the best teachers. Alexander's mother Elena was then living in Florence and wanted him beside her, so he moved to Italy, where, at age 13, he was placed in a school run by the famous Swiss educator Fellenberg in Hofwyl near Bern. Alexander stayed here for five years, perfectly mastering several foreign languages, as well as studying history and natural sciences.

At the age of 18, he left for Paris, studying at the Sorbonne, before moving on to the University of Göttingen. The long time he spent abroad as a young man undoubtedly influenced his worldview and made him familiar with intellectual movements in Western Europe — for example, while studying in Göttingen in 1825, he joined the student associated Corps Curonia Goettingensis or Kuron VII Göttingen (see Studentenverbindung).

=== Career ===
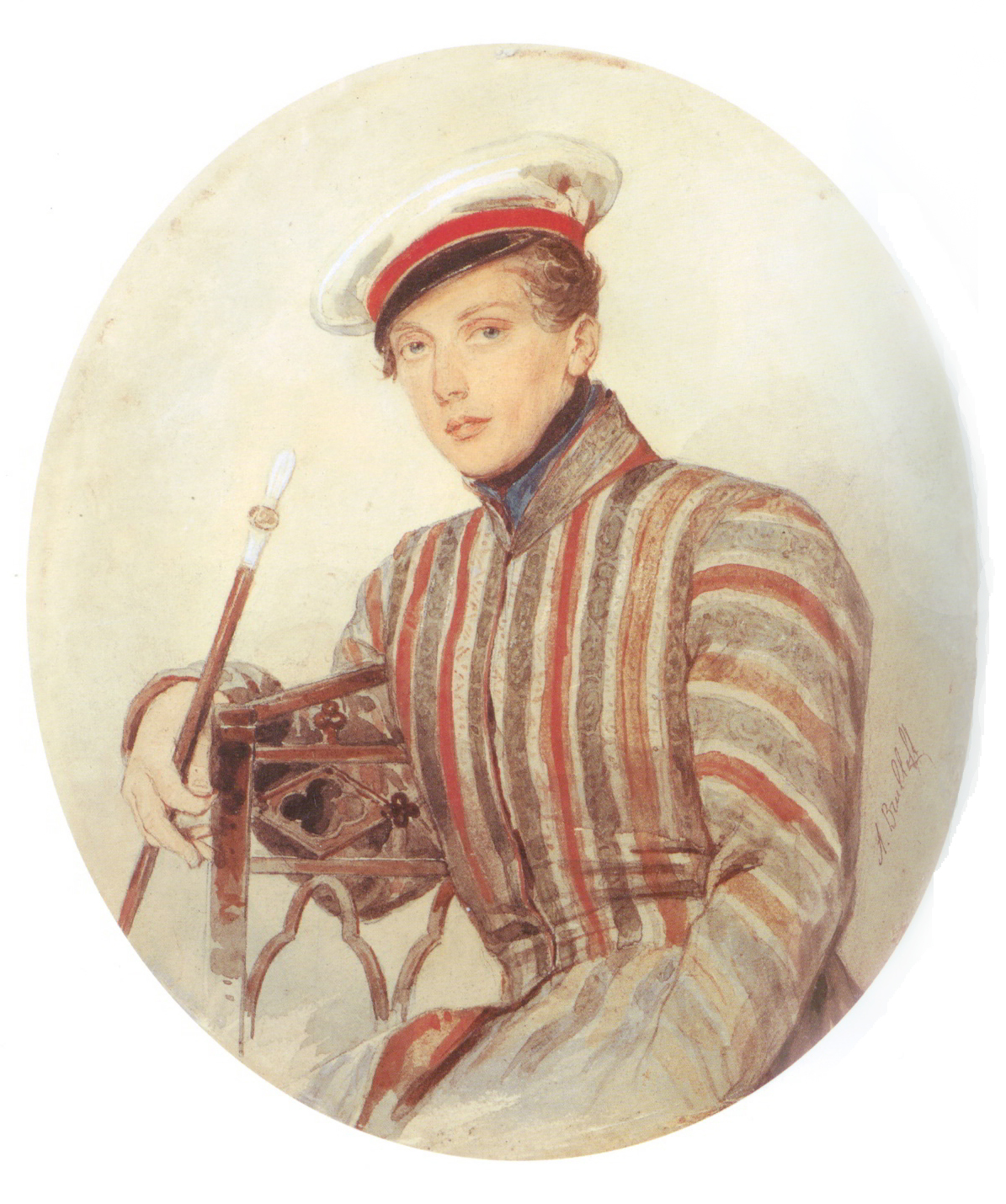
Watercolour of Suvorov by Alexander Brullov, 1830

He fought in the Caucasus and in Poland and was repeatedly sent on diplomatic missions to the German courts. In 1848 he became Governor-General of Baltic provinces, which he managed highly successfully. From 1861 he was governor general of Saint Petersburg and from 1866 inspector general of the infantry. He is buried in the cemetery of the Trinity-Sergius Monastery. He was awarded Serbian Order of the Cross of Takovo and a number of other decorations.

== Family ==
In 1830, he married Lyubov V. Yartsova and their children were:

- Lyubov (1831–1883), first married to state councilor, Gentleman of the Bedchamber A. V. Golitsyn, second married to Colonel Vladimir Molostvovym (1835–1877), son of Lieutenant General and Senator Vladimir Porfirevich Molostvova;
- Arkady (1834–1893), aide-de-camp to Alexander II of Russia, who died childless, causing the princes of Italy, counts of Suvorov-Rymniksky line to become extinct;
- Alexandra (1844–1927), maid of honour, married Major-General Sergei Kozlov (1853–1906).

== Sources ==
- "Суворов, Александр Аркадьевич" . Brockhaus and Efron Encyclopedic Dictionary (in Russian). 1906.
