= Elena Alexandrovna Naryshkina =

Russian noblewoman

Elena Aleksandrovna Naryshkina
- Serene Princess of Italy; Countess Suvorov-Rymniksky
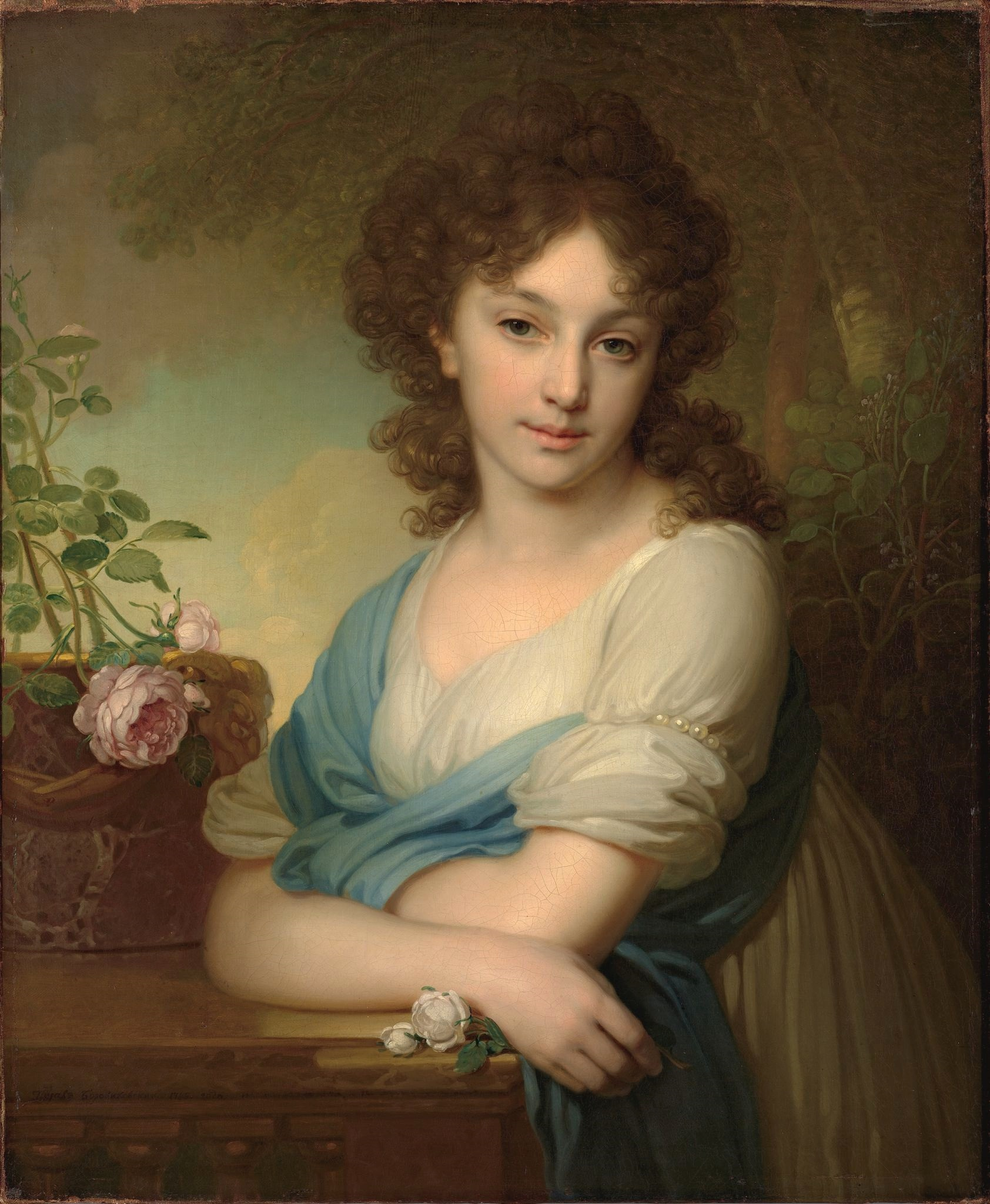
- Portrait by Vladimir Borovikovsky, 1799
- Born: 1785; Saint Petersburg, Russian Empire
- Died: 15 December [O.S. 3 December] 1855; Odessa, Kherson province, Russian Empire
- Noble family: Naryshkin
- Spouses: Prince Arkady Alexandrovich Suvorov; Prince Vasily Sergeevich Golitsyn
- Issue: Maria Suvorova; Varvara Suvorova; Alexander Suvorov; Aglaida Suvorova; Konstantin Suvorov
- Father: Aleksandr Lvovich Naryshkin
- Mother: Maria Alexeievna Senyavina

Elena Alexandrovna Naryshkina, Serene Princess of Italy, Countess Suvorov-Rymniksky (1785 – 15 December [O.S. 3 December] 1855), was a Russian noblewoman, maid of honour, and member of the ancient Naryshkin family.

== Early life ==
Elena Alexandrovna was the eldest daughter of the chief chamberlain Aleksandr Naryshkin and Maria Alexeievna Senyavina, the favourite lady-in-waiting of Catherine the Great. Her parents later enjoyed the favour of Paul I and Alexander I, the later even called Naryshkin his cousin.

The Naryshkins gave their daughter an education. Elena Alexandrovna studied music. She was presented at court at a young age and was made a maid of honour. Her parents led a social life, their mansion on the English Embankment often hosted balls and receptions, where Elena attended.

The Naryshkin family was friendly with the General Alexander Suvorov. His son, Arkady was won the heart of Elena, though at the time he was engaged to Princess Wilhelmine, Duchess of Sagan. The match was made at the behest of the couple's parents, and the pair did not have feelings for each other. The marriage fell through after the General's death in 1800. Arkady Suvorov thus became the owner of a large fortune and was free to marry of his own choosing.

== First marriage ==
On 15 July 1800 in Saint Petersburg, the 15-year-old Prince Arkady Suvorov married the 14-year-old Elena Naryshkina. However, the marriage was short-lived, and it is unlikely that the couple found happiness.

Prince Suvorov was gifted by nature and, like his father, had many traits that were not suited for family or home life. He preferred roaming the fields with dogs and kept company with bachelors with which he indulged in debauchery, card games, and often lied to his young wife. This kept him distracted from home, where his wife was bored and alone, and accepted the courtship of many admirers.

Elena Alexandrovna found three inseparable friends. Her cousin, Count Mikhail Vorontsov, the satirical poet Sergey Marin, and the colonel Dmitry Arseniev. All three had tender feelings for Princess Suvorova.

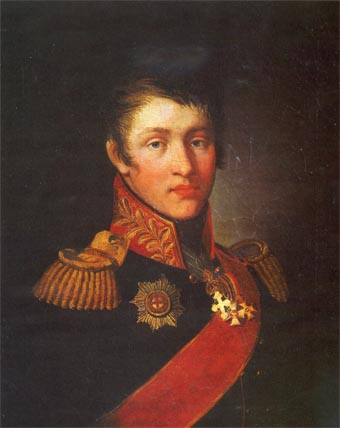
Arkady Alexandrovich Suvorov in 1809

Count Vorontsov later cooled towards her and used his efforts to save his friend Arsenyev from a fatal passion. Arsenyev had an unrequited infatuation with Princess Suvorova, which led him to flee to the island of Corfu with the army, and later to Italy in 1805. Vorontsov attempted to expose him to Suvorova's shortcomings, writing to him from Saint Petersburg:

"I cannot describe to you how much I am grieved by your condition, and the more so because the immediate cause of it is my cousin, whom I have always loved as my own soul. I cannot stop loving her completely, but I cannot remain on the same footing with her, and there will never again be that frankness between us that once existed. Thank God, from your last letters we can hope that you have completely overcome the passion that tormented you. I swear to you, although it pains me to admit it, that the object of it does not at all deserve your attention. She has become completely spoiled. In place of the sincere nature that was so amiable in her, there is now all coquetry and pretense. With me she is very meek and, it seems, a little afraid of me; but with others she is unrecognizable. Now she shoots all her arrows at Konstantin Benckendorff. Despise her, she deserves it - but be content with this and do not reveal her vices to others, if not for her, then for me..."

In April of 1811, during the Russo-Turkish War, the 26 year old Arkady Suvorov died while crossing the Rymnik, the same river on whose banks his father had won one of his great victories. The river had overflowed considerably, and the soldiers crossing it were taking a great risk. According to one version, Suvorov suggested waiting out the flood, but the coachman assured him that he knew every stone there and ordered them to move on. Near the middle of the river, the carriage fell and turned upside down. Apparently, Arkady managed to leave the covered carriage and was subsequently crushed by the horses. In another version, while crossing the river Suvorov saw a wounded soldier being carried away by the current and pulled him to the surface, but drowned. Acquaintances and friends deeply sympathised with Suvorov's family. In May of 1811, Alexander Bulgakov wrote to his brother Konstantin:

"Every time you remember the count, my heart bleeds. You don't know yet that he is no longer here, the young hero, the support of his fatherland. Everyone here is still inconsolable. The Emperor wrote his mother a heartbreaking letter, which will be an eternal monument of his love for the deceased."

== Widowhood ==
A widow at the age of 25, Princess Suvorova went abroad. She only returned to Russia occasionally for short periods, since her poor health required a warmer climate.

In 1814, Elena Alexandrovna was in Vienna where her father accompanied Empress Elizabeth Alexeievna during the Congress of Vienna. Suvorova attracted attention amongst the gathering of kings and princes from all over Europe, and occupied a prominent place amongst the Viennese court and European aristocracy.

In both the capitals of Europe and the waters of Germany where she spent the summer months, Elena Alexandrovna led a social life and gained many friends and admirers. During her stay in Rome in 1815 and 1816, the famous Rossini wished to write a cantata with the inclusion of some Russian motif, for which he turned to Giuliani. Giuliana recalled the melody "Oh, why was it necessary to fence in a vegetable garden, oh, what was the use of planting cabbage". Rossini later repeated the cantata in the opera The Barber of Seville which he was composing at the time.

== Second marriage ==
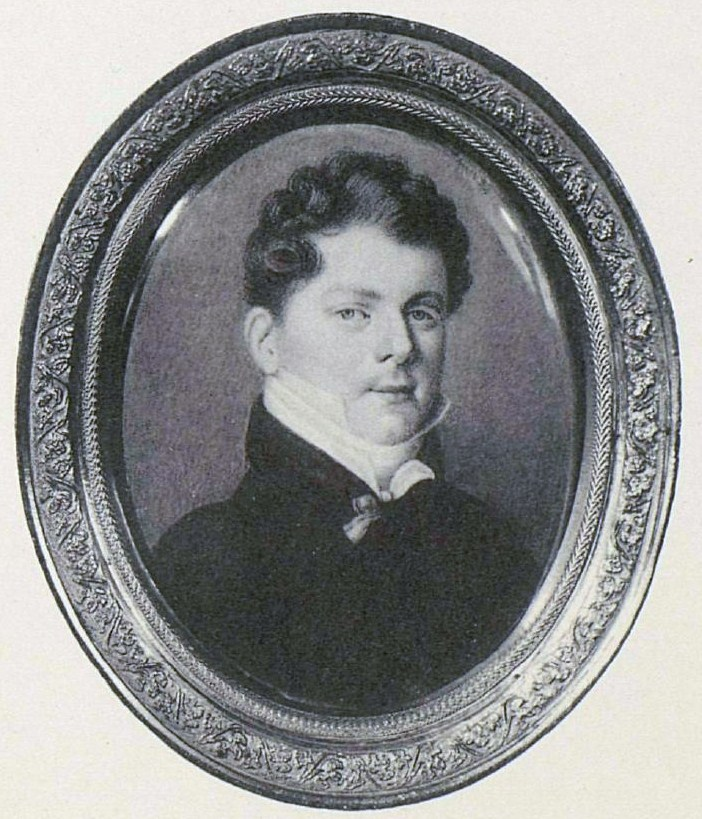
Vasily Sergeevich Golitsyn

During her twelve years of widowhood, Elena Alexandrova had multiple opportunities to remarry, but decided instead to devote herself to raising her four children. Only when they had grown up, and her eldest daughter was out of the home, did she remarry.

After spending the summer of 1823 in Baden, Elena Alexandrovna received a proposal from the 30 year old actual state councilor and chamberlain, Prince Vasily Sergeyevich Golitsyn. The wedding took place in Berlin and caused much gossip in society. Alexander Bulgakov wrote to his brother in January of 1824:

"Suvorova's wedding surprises everyone here too. Both are crazy. And who knows, maybe the spouses will be exemplary. This is the age of extraordinary things."

Following the marriage, Elena Alexandrovna spent most of her time in the south of Russia, in Odessa, Simferopol, and in her husbands Crimean estate Vasili-Saray, enjoying quiet domestic happiness. From time to time she visited Saint Petersburg, Dolly Ficquelmon wrote in her diary on 8 February 1833 following a ball at the Senyavins:

"Here appeared the once famous beauty Princess Helen Suvorova, who after a very stormy, very cheerfully spent youth and very noisy fame in society, several years ago remarried, becoming the wife of Prince Basil Golitsyn, and is moving towards a happy and calm old age. Her story, like many others, once again proves that not all lost sheep return to the sheepfold by thorny paths. Among them there are those for whom the path with roses is more reliable!"

She was a friend of Zhukovsky who enjoyed listening to her sing, as well as the blind poet Ivan Kozlov, with whom she maintained a constant correspondence. Until the last days of her life, nearly having lost her eyesight, Elena Alexandrovna retained a fresh mind and charming friendliness. She died on 3 December 1855 in Odessa, where she is buried.

== Issue ==
Elena Alexandrovna had no children from her second marriage, but had two sons and three daughter from her first:

- Maria Arkadyevna Suvorova (26 February 1802 – 16 February 1870), a student of the Smolny Institute, maid of honour, and addressee of Pushkin's poem "the memory of her has long been..." She married Prince Mikhail Golitsyn (1793–1856) in 1820, and later married M. M. Ostolopov.
- Varvara Arkadyevna Suvorova (16 March 1803 – 22 February 1885), she married Dmitri Bashmakov (1792–1836), with whom she had six children. She married secondly, Prince Andrei Gorchakov (1776 – 1855).
- Alexander Arkadyevich Suvorov (5 July 1804 – 31 January 1882), infantry general. He married maid of honour Lyubov Vasilyevna Yarsova (1811–1867)
- Aglaida Arkadyevna Suvorova (5 November 1805 – 13 February 1806), was baptised by her grandmother Maria Naryshkina.
- Konstantin Arkadyevich Suvorov (10 November 1809 – 1877), chamberlain of the Imperial court. He was married to Elizaveta Alekseevna Khitrovo (1822–1859), daughter of Alexei Khitrovo.
