= Dukhovskaya Church =

Church in St. Petersburg, Russia

Coordinates: 59°55′20″N 30°23′18″E

The Church of the Descent of the Holy Spirit Церковь Сошествия Святого Духа
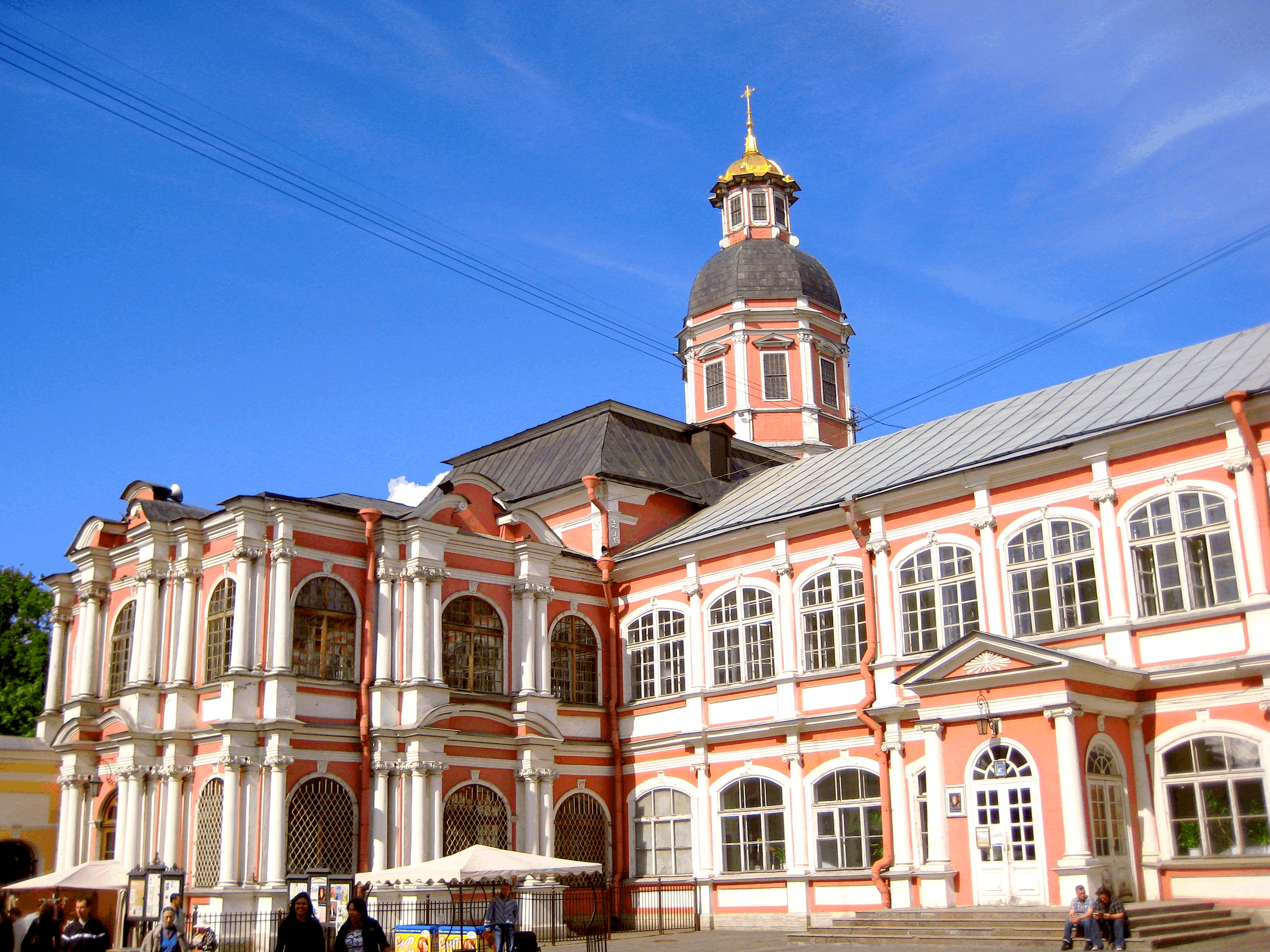
- The porch right of centre is the doorway of the former church

Religion
- Affiliation: Russian Orthodox

Location
- Location: Monastyrki Embankment 1, Saint Petersburg
- Interactive map of The Church of the Descent of the Holy Spirit; Церковь Сошествия Святого Духа

Architecture
- Architect: Vasiliy Petrov
- Style: Petrine Baroque
- Groundbreaking: 1820
- Completed: 1822

Website
- www.lavra.spb.ru

The Dukhovskaya Church (Russian: Духовская церковь), formally the Church of the Descent of the Holy Spirit (Церковь Сошествия Святого Духа), is a former Russian Orthodox church in Saint Petersburg. It is in the Diocese of Saint Petersburg and is part of the Alexander Nevsky Lavra.

Built into the existing wing of the monastery that linked the Holy Trinity Cathedral and the Annunciation Church, the new church was designed to ease overcrowding of the Annunciation Church. As built, the church was richly decorated with a three-tiered iconostasis and paintings and sculpture from some of Russia's leading artists. The church was consecrated in 1822 in the name of the Descent of the Holy Spirit, and shortly afterwards a small aisle at the choir end of the church was consecrated in the name of Saint Sergius of Radonezh. Renovations took place in 1867, and extensions were made to increase burial space. In 1881 the Dukhovskoy Church hosted the funeral of author Fyodor Dostoevsky, and in the mid-1890s a small chapel was consecrated to Saint Evdokia.

Despite calls to protect the important historical and artistic heritage of the church, it was not one of those selected for conversion into a museum necropolis during the Soviet period and was instead passed through various organisations, who at times used it as a boiler room, for coal storage, or as temporary accommodation. The church was briefly returned to the diocese in the 1950s, and a church was once more consecrated, this time to Saint Alexander Nevsky. It was once again confiscated by the city authorities during a period of anti-religious campaigning and hosted a blood transfusion station until its return to the monastery in the early 2000s. The church building is undergoing restoration, and there are plans to reopen it as a place of worship.

== Design and construction ==
The Dukhovsky wing of the monastery, linking the Holy Trinity Cathedral and the Annunciation Church, was designed by Domenico Trezzini in the Petrine Baroque style. Construction began on the Annunciation Church end of the building in 1717, and was completed in 1725 by Leonard Theodor Schwertfeger. The ground floor held meeting rooms and monastic cells, the upper storey contained halls, the rooms of the governor, and more cells. Plans for a new church to ease the overcrowding in the Annunciation Church had been under consideration since 1817, and in 1819 the halls adjacent to the Annunciation Church were combined into a single two-storey hall, with altar in its eastern part.

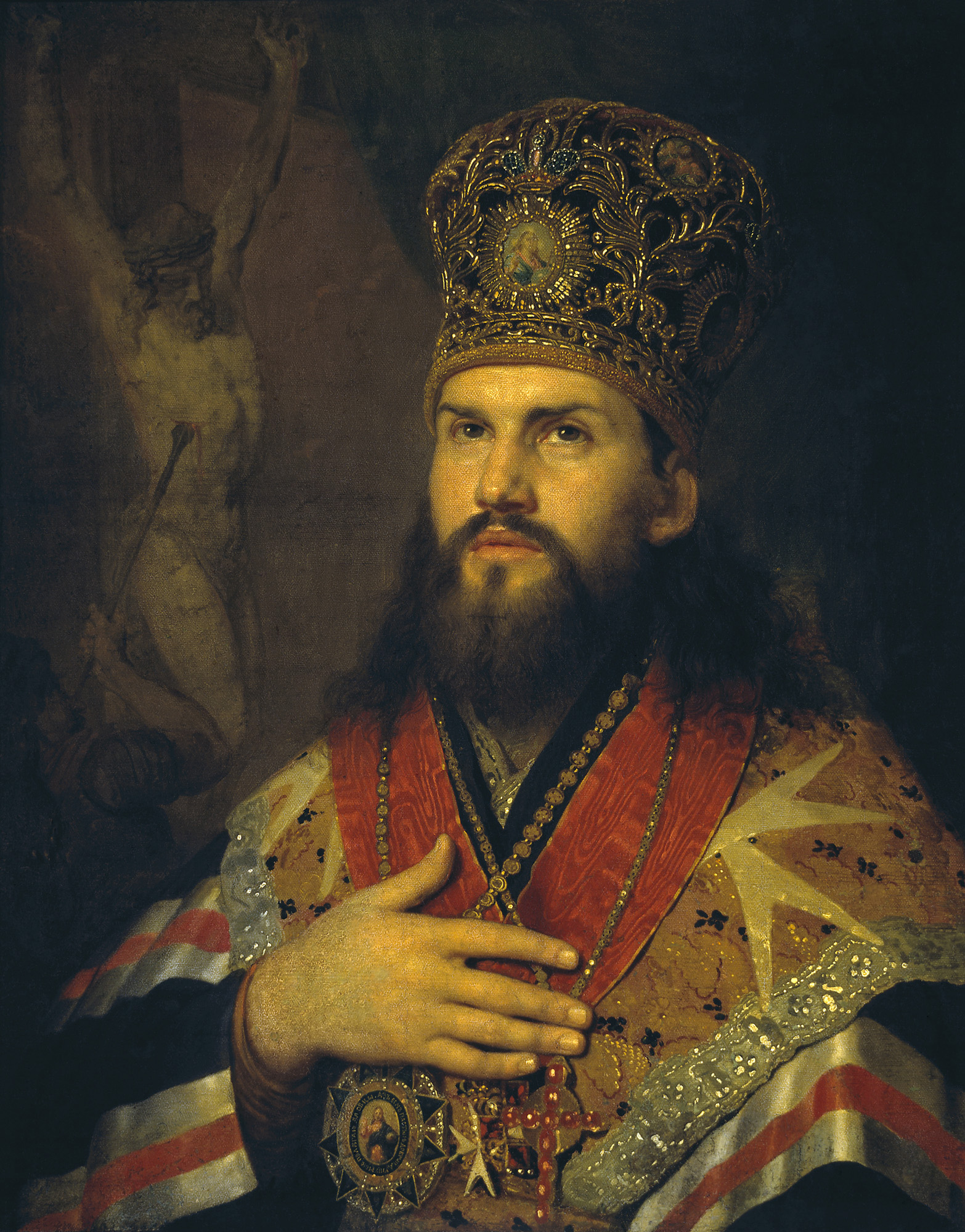
Metropolitan Mikhail, who ordered the building of the church, and was one of the first to be buried in it.

On 23 May 1820 construction started on a house church for the wing, by order of Metropolitan Mikhail, and to the design of architect Vasiliy Petrov. The Lavra's own funds were not sufficient to cover the cost, so donations were solicited. The building was expanded from the east side to accommodate the altar, and a porch was placed on the west side. The new church was consecrated on 18 May 1822 by Metropolitan Serafim in the name of the Descent of the Holy Spirit. The church had a floor-to-ceiling three-tiered iconostasis by J. B. Nashon and K. Scheibe, with paintings by D. I. Antonelli. The altarpiece, titled "Transformation" was painted by A. V. Shevelykin, while further decoration was provided with a series of evangelical images by M. K. Nabokov and stucco works by N. Zorin. On the left of the choir was an icon with a particle of the relics of Saint Panteleimon. A month after the consecration of the Dukhovskaya Church, on 18 June 1822, a small aisle at the choir end of the church was consecrated in the name of Saint Sergius of Radonezh and fitted with a semi-circular iconostasis, and an icon presented by Sergei Potemkin.

== Renovations ==
The church was renovated in 1867 and decorated with paintings by R. F. Vinogradov. The following year it was expanded with an extension for the family crypt of Nikolai Levashov, the governor of Saint Petersburg. On 1 February 1881 the Dukhovskoy Church was the setting of the funeral of author Fyodor Dostoevsky. Between 1894 and 1895 a small chapel with a single-tier iconostasis was built to the right of the altar, over the crypt of the Galunov family, and consecrated on 12 March 1895 by Metropolitan Palladiy to Saint Evdokia.

== Soviet period ==
The Dukhovskaya Church was the last of the Lavra churches in operation during the Soviet period, finally being closed in mid-January 1936. A commission, consisting of representatives from the Institute of History, the Communist Academy, Pushkin House, the Academy of Material Culture, the Committee for the Preservation of Monuments, the Museum of the City, and others, proposed that the Dukhovskaya Church be protected in the same way as the Annunciation Church, "because of the presence of a large number of museum valuables and historical burials". The proposal was ignored, and in July 1936 the city administration turned the Dukhovskaya Church over to the "Lengorplodovoch" organisation, which demolished many of the funerary monuments to install a boiler room and coal storage. The icons were transferred to the Holy Trinity Cathedral, and after numerous public protests, after six months the church was transferred to the OSOAVIAKhIM Aero Club, and then to the Spartak sports society. The church then ended up being transferred to the Kirov Plant for use as temporary accommodation. A number of monuments were moved from the Dukhovskaya Church by the State Museum of Urban Sculpture to preserve them, and they were placed in the Annunciation Church or the Church of St Lazarus, designated display sites of historical funerary monuments.

The Dukhovsky wing was returned to the diocese in 1949, and in 1950 a church was briefly consecrated in the building to Saint Alexander Nevsky, but was closed in 1961 during the resumption of the anti-religious campaigns, and the church reverted to the city authorities. Up to the early 2000s the building hosted a blood transfusion station. The wing was finally restored to the monastery in 2001. The building currently houses the governor’s chambers and a number of monastic cells. In 2003 the monastery opened a spiritual-educational centre named "Svyatoduhovsky" in the former church. The monastery plans to rebuild the former Dukhovskaya Church as a home church.

== Burials ==
Burials took place in the church even before its consecration, including that of its founder, Metropolitan Mikhail in 1820. Several crypts were constructed under the Dukhovskaya Church, and in 1825 another forty burial places were added at a cost of 1,000 rubles. The crypts of the Dukhovskaya Church offered much more burial space than that of the neighbouring Annunciation Church, over the century of its existence there came to be 172 graves, including those of several metropolitans of Saint Petersburg. A number of monuments were saved after the church's closure by being transferred to other museum sites in the Lavra. Some, like those of Konstantin Bulgakov, Viktor Kochubey and Natalia Zagryazhskaya were transferred to the Lazarevskoe Cemetery church. Others, like those of Mikhail Miloradovich and Dmitry Senyavin, were placed in the Annunciation Church.

Image	Name	Born	Died	Occupation	Reference
	Anastasia	1763	1838	Georgian princess (batonishvili), daughter of King Heraclius II and Queen Darejan Dadiani.	
	Grigol Bagration	1787	1861	Georgian nobleman, army officer, Major-General. Russo-Turkish War, Russo-Persian War, Caucasian War.	
	Ioane Bagration	1768	1830	Georgian prince (batonishvili), writer and encyclopaedist. Monument moved to the Church of St Lazarus in 1937.	
	Konstantin Bulgakov	1782	1835	Diplomat, privy councillor, postal administrator. Director of the Moscow Post Office, Director of Saint Petersburg Post Office, Director of the Postal Department. Monument moved to the St Lazarus Church in 1937.	
	Dmitry Buturlin	1790	1849	Army officer, general, military historian, member of the Governing Senate and State Council, Director of the Imperial Public Library.	
	Alexey Dolgorukov	1767	1834	Statesman, member of the Governing Senate and State Council, Active Privy Councillor, Prosecutor General.	
	Yekaterina von Engelhardt	1761	1829	Noblewoman, lady in waiting to Catherine the Great.	
	Nikolai Gagarin	1784	1842	Army officer, general, Napoleonic Wars, Battle of Borodino, vice-president of the Council of Ministers.	
	Grigol	1789	1830	Georgian batonishvili, army officer, poet. Monument transferred to the Church of St Lazarus in 1937.	
	Viktor Kochubey	1768	1834	Statesman, diplomat, aide of Emperor Alexander I. Ambassador to Turkey, Government reform of Alexander I. Minister of Foreign Affairs, Minister of the Interior, President of the State Council, Chairman of the Council of Ministers, Chancellor. Monument transferred to the Church of St Lazarus in 1937.	
	Alexander Kushelov-Bezborodko	1800	1855	Nobleman and politician. Chamberlain, honorary member of the Russian Academy of Sciences, director of the Treasury Department, senator, Controller of State.	
	Nikolai Kushelev-Bezborodko	1834	1862	Art collector. Contemporary paintings and sculptures, Barbizon school, Imperial Academy of Arts, Hermitage Museum, Pushkin Museum.	
	Pavel Martynov	1732	1838	Military officer, Lieutenant General, French Revolutionary Wars, Napoleonic Wars, Battle of Austerlitz, Battle of Borodino, Battle of Kulm, commanding officer of the Izmaylovsky Regiment. Russo-Turkish War, November Uprising, Battle of Warsaw. Commander of the Peter and Paul Fortress.	
	Mikhail Miloradovich	1771	1825	Military leader, general, Napoleonic Wars, Italian and Swiss campaigns of 1799, Governor General of Saint Petersburg, Decembrist revolt. Monument transferred to the Annunciation Church in 1937.	
	Aleksandr Naryshkin	1760	1826	Naryshkin family, director of the Imperial Theatres, Marshal of Nobility of Saint Petersburg.	
	Maria Nesselrode	1786	1803	Courtier, lady in waiting to Empress Elizabeth Alexeievna, wife of Karl Nesselrode. Socialite, salonist, philanthropist. Monument transferred to the Church of St Lazarus in 1937.	
	Nino	1772	1847	Georgian princess royal, daughter of King George XII, wife of Prince Grigol Dadiani, regent for her son Levan. Monument transferred to the Church of St Lazarus in 1937.	
	Nikolay Novosiltsev	1761	1838	Statesman, diplomat, aide of Emperor Alexander I. Government reform of Alexander I, commissar at the Council of State of Poland, Russification, Chairman of the Council of Ministers.	
	Anna Protasova	1745	1826	Noblewoman, lady-in-waiting to Catherine the Great.	
	Konstantin Rodofinikin	1760	1838	Military officer, diplomat, member of the State Council.	
	Yekaterina Samoylova	1763	1830	Lady-in-waiting to Catherine the Great, society figure. Monument transferred to the St Lazarus Church in the 1930s.	
	Dmitry Senyavin	1763	1831	Military leader, admiral, Napoleonic Wars, Second Archipelago Expedition. Monument transferred to the Annunciation Church in 1937.	
	Natalia Zagryazhskaya	1747	1837	Philanthropist, salonist and lady-in-waiting. Monument transferred to the St Lazarus Church in 1937.	
