= Bezborodko =

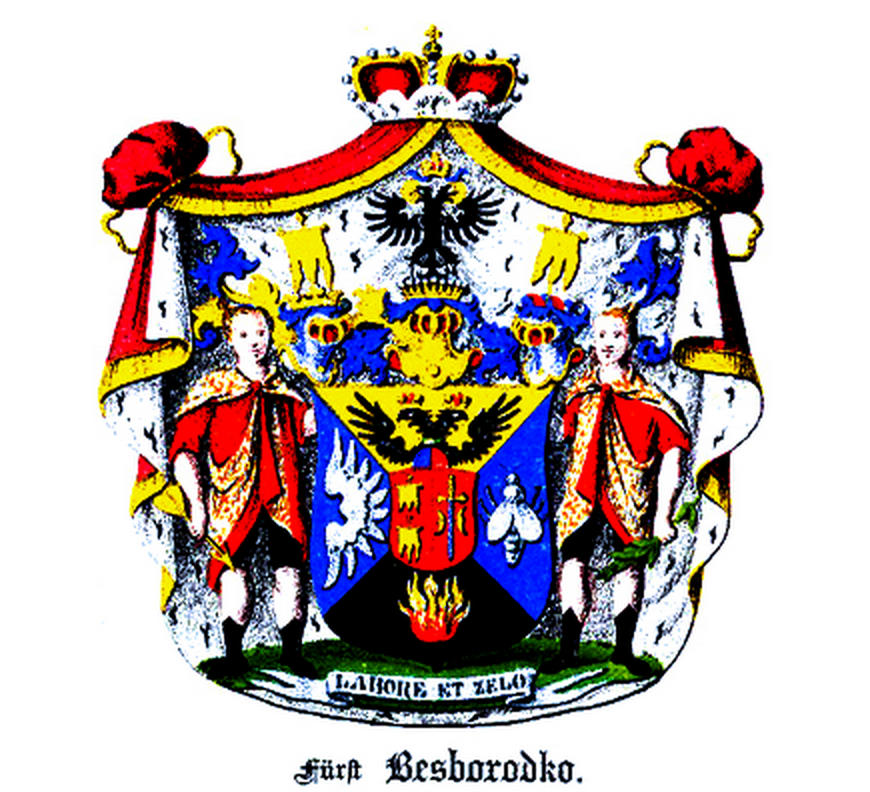
Coat of arms of Princes Bezborodko

The House of Bezborodko (Cyrillic: Безбородько or Безбородко) was a Russian princely family, descended from Cossack Hetmanate senior ranks.

== History ==
The branch descended from Count Alexander Bezborodko was raised to the title of Knyaz (styled as 'Serene Highness') on 5 April 1797.

== Surname ==
Bezborodko is also a gender-neutral Ukrainian surname.

== Notable people ==
- Alexander Bezborodko (1747–1799), Grand Chancellor of Russian Empire
- Alexander Kushelev-Bezborodko (1800–1855), Russian nobleman and politician
- Denys Bezborodko (born 1994), Ukrainian football forward
- Grigory Kushelev-Bezborodko (1832–1870), Russian writer, publisher and philanthropist, son of Nikolai
- Nikolai Alexandrovich Kushelev-Bezborodko (1834–1862), Russian art collector, son of Nikolai
