= List of burials at Lazarevskoe Cemetery =

Burials in a cemetery in St. Petersburg, Russia

Coordinates: 59°55′12″N 30°23′24″E

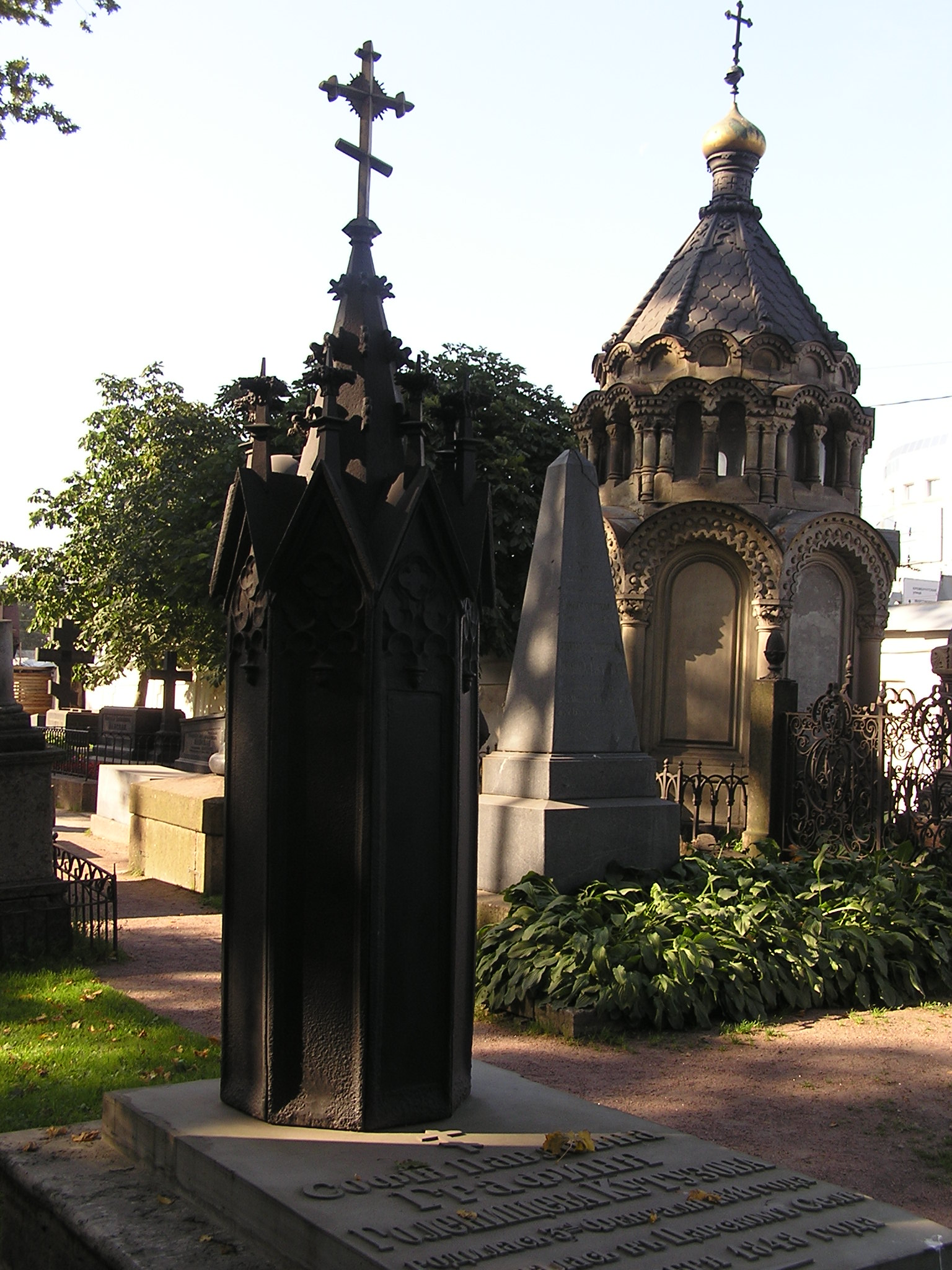
Monuments in the Lazarevskoe Cemetery

Lazarevskoe Cemetery (Russian: Лазаревское кладбище), part of the Alexander Nevsky Lavra in the centre of Saint Petersburg, is the oldest surviving cemetery in the city and contains a large number of burials as well as monuments and memorials to notable figures in Russian Imperial history.

Burials began in 1717 when Natalya Alexeyevna, the sister of Peter the Great, was interred in the burial vault of the Church of St Lazarus, from which the cemetery took its name. During the early years of its existence, it required the Emperor's permission to allow burials in the cemetery, making it the chosen location for the burial plots of St Petersburg's elite. By the end of the eighteenth century burial was extended to the wealthy merchant class, in exchange for the payment of large sums of money.

By the nineteenth century, the cemetery was becoming overcrowded, and the first of the new cemeteries in the Lavra, the Tikhvin Cemetery, was opened in 1823. Burials in the Lazarevskoe Cemetery became less frequent in the nineteenth century, and in the twentieth century occurred in only exceptional cases. One of the last people to be interred was Count Sergei Witte in 1915, and in 1919 the cemetery was closed to new burials.

During the Soviet period the cemetery was closed and placed under state protection, administered by the society "Old Petersburg" (Russian: «Старый Петербург»). In 1932 it was declared a museum and part of the State Museum of Urban Sculpture. Redevelopment work in the Soviet period involved clearing away those memorials thought to have low historical or artistic interest, while those considered to have higher historical or artistic interest were brought from other cemeteries across the city. Large scale restoration work was carried out after the ending of the Siege of Leningrad, with the museum opening to the public in 1952.

Containing a large number of famous burials and elaborate funerary sculpture from some of the country's leading artists, the cemetery has been called the Necropolis of the XVIII century (Russian: некрополь XVIII века). Examples of the work of Ivan Martos, Mikhail Kozlovsky, Vasily Demut-Malinovsky, Andrey Voronikhin, Fedot Shubin, Fyodor Tolstoy and other masters can be seen. Famous people interred in the cemetery include early associates of Peter the Great, such as Field Marshal Boris Sheremetev, General Adam Veyde, and Court Physician Robert Erskine. The graves of academics Mikhail Lomonosov and Stepan Krasheninnikov; playwrights Denis Fonvizin and Yakov Knyazhnin; architects Ivan Starov, and Andrey Voronikhin; statesmen and politicians Alexander Stroganov, Nikolay Mordvinov, Mikhail Muravyov-Vilensky and Sergei Witte; and military officers such as Vasily Chichagov are also to be seen. The family vaults of the Beloselsky-Belozersky, Trubetskoy, Volkonsky and Naryshkin ancient noble houses were located here, as were those of some of the prominent merchant dynasties such as the Demidovs and Yakovlevs. Art historian Nikolai Vrangel wrote "It was as if all those who had once formed a close circle of court society gathered here after death. A whole epoch, a whole world of obsolete ideas, almost all the court society of Elizabeth, Catherine and Paul were buried in the small space of the Lazarevskoe cemetery".

The remains of a number of famous figures in Russian history were reburied in the cemetery during the Soviet period, among whom were architect Jean-François Thomas de Thomon, mathematician Leonhard Euler and engineer Agustín de Betancourt.

== Burials and monuments ==
| Image | Name | Born | Died | Occupation | Monument | Reference |
|---|---|---|---|---|---|---|
| | Aleksey Antropov | 1716 | 1795 | Painter, frescoes of the Summer Palace, Winter Palace, Anichkov Palace, court painter to Peter III of Russia | | |
| | Stepan Apraksin | 1702 | 1758 | Military leader, commanded Russian armies during the Seven Years' War, Battle of Gross-Jägersdorf. Buried in the Church of St Lazarus. | | |
| | Ioane Bagration | 1768 | 1830 | Georgian prince (batonishvili), writer and encyclopaedist. Originally buried in the Dukhovskaya Church, monument and remains transferred to the Church of St Lazarus in 1940. | | |
| | Dmitry Bagration-Imeretinsky | 1799 | 1845 | Batonishvili, Major General of Imperial Russian Army. Russo-Turkish War, November Uprising. Commanded Uhlans, Hussars and Courland Dragoons. | | |
| | Agustín de Betancourt | 1758 | 1824 | Engineer, educator, urban planner, construction manager. Originally buried in the Smolensky Lutheran Cemetery, monument and remains transferred in 1979. | | |
| | Aleksandr Bibikov | 1765 | 1822 | Military leader, Imperial Russian Army, Russo-Swedish War and Napoleonic Wars. Ambassador and senator. | | |
| | Nikita Bichurin | 1777 | 1853 | Sinologist, Orthodox monk. Translator, opened first Chinese-language school in the Russian Empire. | | |
| | Vladimir Borovikovsky | 1757 | 1825 | Portrait and icon painter, Catherine the Great. Originally buried in the Smolensky Cemetery, monument and remains transferred in the 1930s. | | |
| | Peter Chelishchev | 1745 | 1811 | Writer, ethnographer, traveller. | | |
| | Piotr Chernyshev | 1712 | 1773 | Diplomat, privy counsellor, chamberlain and senator. Brass inscription displayed in Church of St Lazarus | | |
| | Avdotya Chernysheva | 1693 | 1747 | Noble and lady in waiting. Royal mistress of Tsar Peter the Great. Monument in cemetery, brass inscription displayed in Church of St Lazarus | | |
| | Ekaterina Chernysheva | 1715 | 1779 | Courtier, maid of honour to Anna of Russia. Monument in cemetery, brass inscription displayed in Church of St Lazarus | | |
| | Vasily Chichagov | 1726 | 1809 | Naval officer, admiral, explorer. Chichagof Island, Russo-Turkish and Russo-Swedish Wars, battles of Öland, Reval and Vyborg Bay | | |
| | Maria Choglokova | 1723 | 1756 | Lady-in-waiting and noble. Cousin and confidante of Empress Elizabeth of Russia, and chief lady-in-waiting to the future Catherine the Great. | | |
| | Dmitry Dashkov | 1789 | 1839 | Writer and dignitary, founder of the literary society "Arzamas". Minister of Justice. | | |
| | Grigory Demidov | 1765 | 1827 | State Councilor, Chamberlain. Industrialist, philanthropist. | | |
| | Vasily Dolgorukov | 1804 | 1868 | Statesman, General of the Cavalry, Minister of War, Chief of Gendarmes and Executive Head of the Third Section of His Imperial Majesty's Own Chancellery | | |
| | Robert Erskine | 1677 | 1718 | Privy councillor, advisor and chief physician to Peter the Great, head of the medical chancellery. First director of the Kunstkamera and library. Buried in the Church of St Lazarus. | | |
| | Leonhard Euler | 1707 | 1783 | Mathematician, physicist, astronomer, logician and engineer. Originally buried in the Smolensky Lutheran Cemetery, monument and remains transferred in 1956. | | |
| | Denis Fonvizin | 1744 | 1792 | Writer, playwright, publicist, translator, state councilor, Russian Enlightenment | | |
| | Ivan Gannibal | 1735 | 1801 | Military leader, Russo-Turkish War. Navarin, Kherson. Général en Chef. Buried in the Church of St Lazarus. | | |
| | Stepan Gedeonov | 1816 | 1878 | Art scholar, playwright, critic and historian, director of the Hermitage Museum and Imperial Theatres | | |
| | Boris Golitsyn | 1776 | 1822 | Military leader, Army officer, Russo-Swedish War, Kościuszko Uprising, Napoleonic Wars, Siege of Danzig | | |
| | Avtonom Golovin | 1667 | 1720 | Military leader, associate of Peter the Great. Azov campaigns, Battle of Narva | | |
| | Aleksey Gorchakov | 1769 | 1817 | General, statesman, Russo-Turkish War, Kościuszko Uprising, Napoleonic Wars, general of the infantry. | | |
| | Alexander Imeretinsky | 1837 | 1900 | Batonishvili, General of the Russian Imperial Army, Russo-Turkish War, Governor-General of Warsaw | | |
| | Nikolai Islenev | 1785 | 1851 | Military officer, division commander, Russo-Turkish War, Kościuszko Uprising, Napoleonic Wars | | |
| | Teodor Janković-Mirijevski | 1741 | 1814 | Educational reformer, academic, scholar and pedagogical writer. | | |
| | Gavriil Katakazi | 1794 | 1867 | Diplomat, Privy Councillor, ambassador to the Ottoman Empire, Bavaria, senator. | | |
| | Pyotr Khanykov | 1743 | 1813 | Naval officer, admiral, Battle of Reval | | |
| | Yakov Knyazhnin | c. 1740 | 1791 | Poet, playwright, translator, member of the Russian Academy, Russian classicism. Originally buried with his wife in the Smolensky Cemetery, monument and remains of both transferred in 1939. | | |
| | Viktor Kochubey | 1768 | 1813 | Statesman, Privy Committee, Government reform of Alexander I. Counsel, ambassador, Minister of Foreign Affairs, Minister of the Interior, President of the State Council and Chairman of the Committee of Ministers. Originally buried in the Dukhovskaya Church, monument and remains transferred to the Church of St Lazarus in 1937. | | |
| | Praskovia Kovalyova-Zhemchugova | 1768 | 1803 | Serf actress and soprano opera singer, wife of Count Nikolai Sheremetev. Buried in the Church of St Lazarus. | | |
| | Ekaterina Kozitskaya | 1746 | 1833 | Industrialist, courtier | | |
| | Mikhail Kozlovsky | 1753 | 1802 | Sculptor, teacher, academician of the Academy of Arts (1794). Professor of the Imperial Academy of Arts, Russian classicism. Originally buried in the Smolensky Cemetery, monument and remains transferred in 1931. | | |
| | Osip Kozodavlev | 1754 | 1819 | Statesman, politician, Minister of the Interior, Privy Councilor, writer, poet, translator, senator, Member of the State Council. | | |
| | Stepan Krasheninnikov | 1711 | 1775 | Explorer, naturalist and geographer, Kamchatka, Russian Academy of Sciences, Krasheninnikov Volcano. Originally buried at the Church of the Annunciation on Vasilyevsky Island. Cemetery later abandoned. Remains rediscovered and reburied in 1988 with a new monument typical of the period established. | | |
| | Mikhail Lomonosov | 1711 | 1765 | Polymath, scientist, poet and writer, natural science, chemistry, physics, mineralogy, history, art, philology, optical devices and others. | | |
| | Anna Lopukhina | 1777 | 1805 | Royal mistress to Emperor Paul I. Buried in the Church of St Lazarev | | |
| | Yakiv Lyzohub | 1675 | 1749 | Military and political figure of the Cossack Hetmanate. | | |
| | Ivan Martos | 1754 | 1835 | Sculptor and art teacher, Neoclassical sculpture, professor at the Imperial Academy of Arts, Monument to Minin and Pozharsky. | | |
| | Pyotr Melissino | c. 1726 | c. 1797 | General of the Artillery, Vice-President of the Commerce Collegium, Russo-Turkish War, Director of the Artillery and Engineering Corps in St. Petersburg. | | |
| | Nikolay Mordvinov | 1754 | 1845 | Naval officer, political thinker, Mikhail Speransky's reforms, Vice-President of the Admiralty, Navy Minister, President of the Free Economic Society. | | |
| | Arkady Morkov | 1747 | 1827 | Diplomat, Russian Collegium for Foreign Affairs. Ambassador to France and Sweden. | | |
| | Mikhail Muravyov | 1757 | 1807 | Nobleman, Privy Councilor, Senator. Member of the Russian Academy, author and poet. | | |
| | Mikhail Muravyov-Vilensky | 1796 | 1866 | Statesman, early Decembrist, Vice-Governor of Vitebsk, Governor of Mogilyov, Russification. Member of the State Council, Minister of State Properties. Governor General of Vilna. | | |
| | Andrey Nartov | 1683 | 1756 | Scientist, military engineer, inventor and sculptor, associate of Peter the Great, member of the Russian Academy of Science. Originally buried at the Church of the Annunciation on Vasilyevsky Island. Remains rediscovered and moved in 1956, with a new monument. | | |
| | Adam Olsufiev | 1721 | 1786 | Russian Enlightenment, lover of literature, patron of opera and theatre, Cabinet Minister and State Secretary of Catherine the Great. Senator, Active Privy Councillor. | | |
| | Maria Perekusikhina | 1739 | 1824 | Memoirist, close friend, confidant and lady's maid to Catherine the Great of Russia. | | |
| | Lev Perovski | 1792 | 1856 | Nobleman and mineralogist, Minister of Internal Affairs, Russian Geographical Society. Buried in the Church of St Lazarus | | |
| | Mark Poltoratsky | 1729 | 1795 | Singer, Active State Councillor | | |
| | Natalia Pushkina | 1769 | 1817 | Wife of poet Alexander Pushkin | | |
| | Giacomo Quarenghi | 1744 | 1817 | Architect, neoclassical architecture, Saint Petersburg, Alexander Palace. Originally buried in the Volkovsky Lutheran cemetery. Remains transferred in 1967, with a new monument. | | |
| | Sophia Razumovskaya | 1746 | 1803 | Courtier, maid of honour to Catherine the Great, mistress of Paul I of Russia | | |
| | Carlo Rossi | 1775 | 1849 | Architect, Saint Petersburg St. Catherine's Church of the Ascension Convent, Yelagin Palace, General Staff Building, façade of the Russian National Library, Alexandrinsky Theatre. Originally buried in the Volkovsky German cemetery, remains and monument transferred in 1940. | | |
| | Alexandra Rzevskaya | 1740 | 1769 | Writer and amateur artist. Buried in the Church of St Lazarus. | | |
| | Yekaterina Samoylova | 1763 | 1830 | Lady-in-waiting to Catherine the Great, society figure. Originally buried in the Dukhovskaya Church, remains transferred the Church of St Lazarus in the 1930s. | | |
| | Alexei Senyavin | 1716 | 1797 | Naval officer, admiral, Russo-Turkish War, Seven Years' War capture of Yenikale and Kerch, Admiralty Board. Initially buried in the Lazarevskoe Cemetery, reburied in the Tikhvin Cemetery in 1831. | | |
| | Semyon Shchedrin | 1745 | 1804 | Landscape painter, member of the Imperial Academy of Arts. Initially buried in the Smolensky Cemetery, reburied in the Lazarevskoe Cemetery in 1939. | | |
| | Boris Sheremetev | 1652 | 1719 | Associate of Peter the Great, diplomat and general field marshal, Great Northern War. Originally buried at the entrance to the Annunciation Church, included in the Church of St Lazarus after 1787-1789 expansion. | | |
| | Dmitri Sheremetev | 1803 | 1871 | Sheremetev family. Chamberlain, philanthropist. Buried in the Church of St Lazarus. | | |
| | Nikolai Sheremetev | 1751 | 1809 | Count, Senator, patron of theatrical and visual arts. Husband of Praskovia Kovalyova-Zhemchugova. Buried in the Church of St Lazarus. | | |
| | Alexander Shishkov | 1784 | 1841 | Statesman, writer, and admiral. Proto-Slavophile, President of the Russian Academy, People's Education Minister, The Trilingual Naval Dictionary. Buried in the Church of St Lazarus. | | |
| | Fedot Shubin | 1740 | 1805 | Sculptor, academician of the Academy of Arts, educational classicism. | | |
| | Peter Shuvalov | 1711 | 1762 | Military officer, artillery. Field marshal, Shuvalov family, founder of Izhevsk. | | |
| | Mikhail Sidorov | 1823 | 1887 | Siberian goldmine owner, Arctic entrepreneur, merchant | | |
| | Ivan Snegiryov | 1793 | 1868 | Ethnographer, Latin instructor, censor, collector of Russian proverbs, folk rituals and observances. Diarist. | | |
| | Ivan Starov | 1747 | 1808 | State Counselor, architect, Trinity Cathedral of the Alexander Nevsky Lavra, academician, professor, adjutant-rector of the Imperial Academy of Arts. | | |
| | Alexander Stroganov | 1733 | 1811 | Member of the Private Committee of Emperor Alexander I, assistant to the Minister of the Interior, President of the Imperial Academy of Arts, director of the Russian Imperial Library, member of the Russian Academy. | | |
| | Pavel Stroganov | 1774 | 1817 | Military commander and statesman, Lieutenant General, Adjutant General to Alexander I of Russia. Privy Committee, Government reform of Alexander I. | | |
| | Sophie Stroganova | 1775 | 1845 | Translator, lady in waiting, patron of the arts and sciences, Scientific and Economic Society. Buried in the Church of St Lazarus. | | |
| | Grigory Teplov | c. 1716 | 1779 | Academic administrator, managed the Petersburg Academy of Sciences, Little Russia, secretary and advisor to Kirill Razumovsky, amateur musician. Buried in the Church of St Lazarus. | | |
| | Fyodor Tolstoy | 1783 | 1873 | Artist, painter, Vice-President of the Imperial Academy of Arts, Hermitage Museum, founder of medal working in Russia, treatise writer, ballet composer. | | |
| | Jean-François Thomas de Thomon | 1760 | 1813 | Neoclassical architect, Old Saint Petersburg Stock Exchange and Rostral Columns, Odessa Theatre. Originally buried in the Smolensky Lutheran Cemetery, monument and remains transferred in 1940. | | |
| | Ivan Trubetskoy | 1667 | 1750 | Military leader, Field Marshal, associate of Peter the Great, boyar, Azov campaigns, governor of Novgorod, Battle of Narva. Buried in the Church of St Lazarus. | | |
| | Varvara Turkestanova | 1775 | 1819 | Noblewoman of Georgian origin, affair with Tsar Alexander I of Russia, correspondent. | | |
| | Alexei Turchaninov | c. 1774 | 1787 | Business magnate and industrialist, metallurgist, philanthropist. | | |
| | Pavel Ushakov | 1779 | 1853 | Military officer, general of infantry. Napoleonic Wars, Battle of Borodino, Russo-Turkish War. | | |
| | Adam Veyde | 1667 | 1720 | Infantry general, associate of Peter the Great. Azov campaigns, Veyde Charter, Great Northern War, Battle of Narva, Pruth River Campaign, Battle of Gangut. | | |
| | Anton de Vieira | c. 1682 | 1745 | Administrator, associate of Peter the Great, administrator in St Petersburg and Siberia, adjutant-general, first chief of St Petersburg Police, senator. | | |
| | Mikhail Vielgorsky | 1788 | 1856 | Official, composer, patron of arts. Buried in the Church of St Lazarus | | |
| | Andrey Voronikhin | 1759 | 1814 | Architect and painter, Russian Empire style, Kazan Cathedral, Saint Petersburg. | | |
| | Anna Vorontsova | 1722 | 1775 | Lady in waiting, salonist and noble, cousin of Elizabeth of Russia. Wife of Chancellor Count Mikhail Illarionovich Vorontsov. Originally buried in the Lazarevskoe Cemetery, remains later transferred to the Annunciation Church. | | |
| | Elizaveta Vorontsova | 1739 | 1792 | Mistress of Emperor Peter III of Russia | | |
| | Sergey Vyazmitinov | 1744 | 1819 | General and statesman. Russo-Turkish War, aide-de-camp of the Vice President of the War Collegium, acting Governor General of Simbirsk and Ufa, first Defence Minister of Russia, commander-in-chief in St.Petersburg. Member of the State Council and the Committee of Ministers. Buried in the Church of St Lazarus. | | |
| | Sergei Witte | 1849 | 1915 | Econometrician, Minister of Finance, October Manifesto, Chairman of the Council of Ministers. | | |
| | Boris Yusupov | 1695 | 1759 | Nobleman and politician, governor general of Moscow and St Petersburg. | | |
| | Pyotr Zavadovsky | 1739 | 1812 | Favourite and lover of Catherine the Great | | |
| | Natalia Zagryazhskaya | 1747 | 1837 | Philanthropist, salonist and lady-in-waiting. Originally buried in the Dukhovskaya Church, monument and remains moved to the St Lazarus Church in 1937. | | |
| | Andreyan Zakharov | 1761 | 1811 | Architect, neoclassicism and eclecticism. Saviour Cathedral, Dniptopetrovsk, Alexander Nevsky Cathedral, Izhevsk, St. Andrew's Cathedral, Kronstadt. Originally buried in the Smolensky Cemetery, monument and remains transferred in 1936. | | |
