= Peasant Women with Brushwood =

19th-century painting by Jean-François Millet

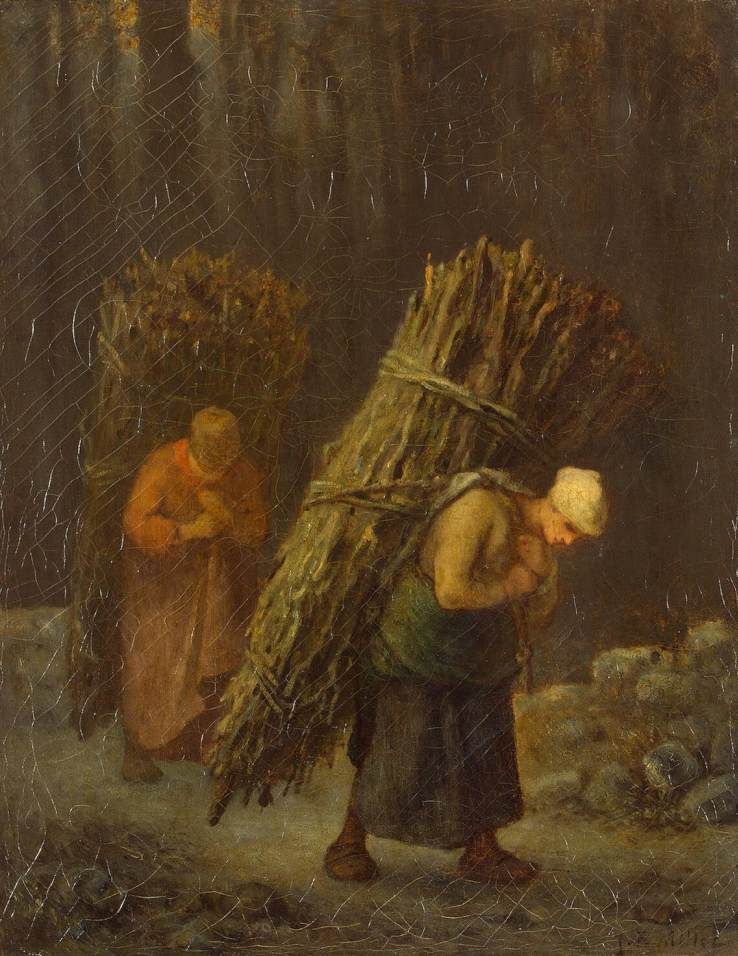
- Artist: Jean-François Millet
- Year: c. 1852
- Type: Oil painting on canvas
- Dimensions: 37.5 cm × 29.5 cm (14.8 in × 11.6 in)
- Location: Hermitage Museum, Saint Petersburg

Peasant Women with Brushwood is an oil-on-canvas painting by the French artist Jean-François Millet, created c. 1852. It is held at the collection of the Hermitage Museum, in Saint Petersburg. The signature of the artist appears at the lower right: JF Millet.

== Description ==
This is one of the many paintings where Millet depicted the harsh rural life of the French peasants. The painting depicts two peasant women returning home, at the twilight. They are dressed in homespun clothes and wear clogs, walking along a forest road while carrying huge bundles of brushwood on their backs. Their posture, with heads low-sunk and backs bent, demonstrates the heavy weight that they carry and their strength. The dark colors used make the human figures blend with the surrounding nature.

Art historian A. G. Kostenevich describes the painting: "In Peasant Women with Brushwood in the figures of two women, from the clog to the head, Millet reproduces the tension, the resistance to the pressing burden. And the dark spot of the forest seems to be still piling up from above. But for all that, the tension is not brought to that excess that would offend the eye and prevent one from contemplating the picture. Measured, there is an almost solemn rhythm of the steps of peasant women."

== Provenance ==
The painting was painted c. 1852 and was soon acquired by the Russian Count Nikolai Alexandrovich Kushelev-Bezborodko. After the death of the owner, the painting, like all the works from his collection, was bequeathed to the Museum of the Russian Academy of Arts and became part of the Kushelev gallery; in 1922 it was transferred to the State Hermitage, in Saint Petersburg.

A preparatory drawing by Millet in pencil and gouache (34.3 × 27.6 cm) is known; it dates from 1858 and is a fully developed sketch of the figures of the two peasant women. Initially, the drawing was part of the collection of Hendrik Willem Mesdag. In March 1920 it was sold in New York, to a certain Seaman, then after changing several owners, since November 1962 it has been in the collection of the banker Robert Lehman. After Lehman's death in 1969, the drawing, along with the bulk of his collection (about 3,000 works of art), was transferred to the Metropolitan Museum of Art for safekeeping.
