= Virgin of Vladimir =

Medieval Byzantine icon depicting the Virgin and Child

- Our Lady of Vladimir, Владимирская икона Божией Матери (Russian)
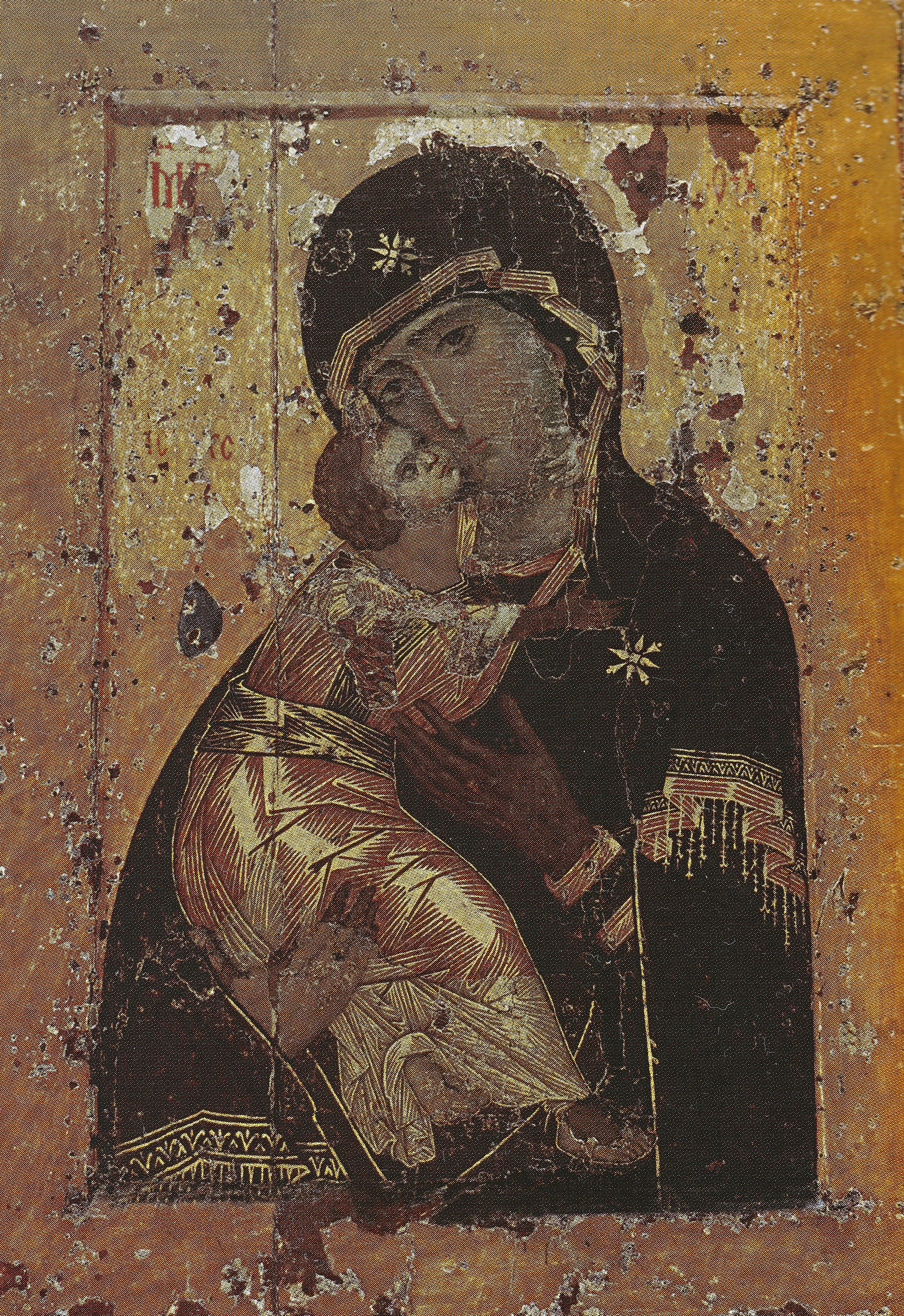
- Artist: Unknown, Luke the Evangelist according to Sacred Tradition
- Year: 33(?)-1131
- Medium: Tempera
- Subject: Virgin Mary
- Dimensions: 104 cm × 69 cm (41 in × 27 in)
- Location: Cathedral of Christ the Saviour, Moscow

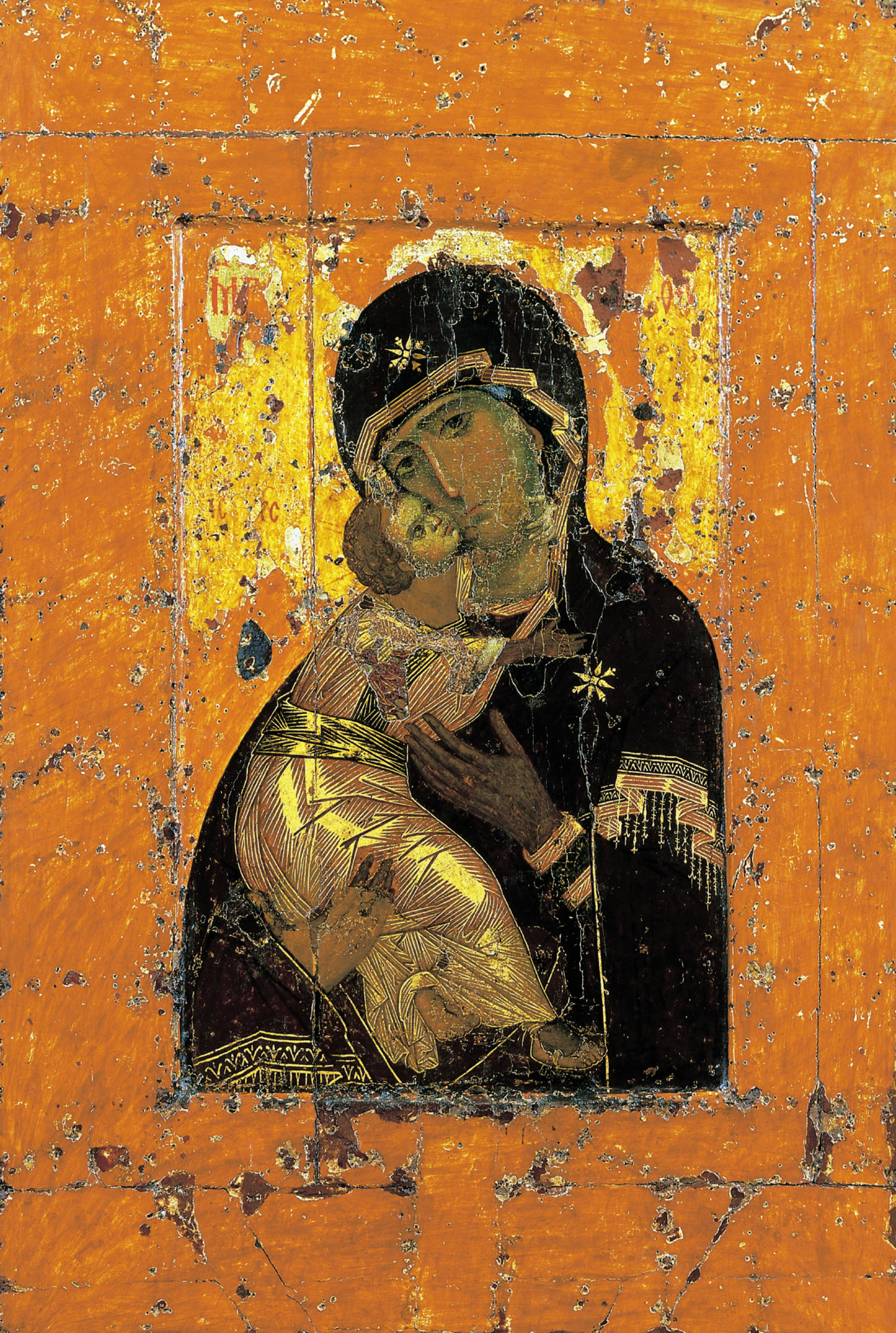
Our Lady of Vladimir, egg tempera on wood panel, 104 by 69 centimetres (41 in × 27 in), painted about 1131 in Constantinople

The Virgin of Vladimir, also known as Vladimir Mother of God, Our Lady of Vladimir (Russian: Владимирская икона Божией Матери (Note: Sometimes also referred to as Our Lady of Vyshhorod and the Theotokos of Vladimir (Greek: Θεοτόκος του Βλαντίμιρ))), is a 12th-century Byzantine icon depicting the Virgin and Child and an early example of the Eleusa iconographic type. It is one of the most culturally significant and celebrated pieces of art in Russian history. Many consider it a national palladium with several miracles of historical importance to Russia being attributed to the icon. Following its near destruction in the thirteenth century, the work has been restored at least five times.

The icon was painted by an unknown artist most likely in Constantinople. It was sent to Kiev as a gift before being transferred to the Assumption Cathedral in Vladimir. It is traditionally said that the icon did not leave Vladimir until 1395, when it was brought to Moscow to protect the city from an invasion by Timur, although the historical accuracy of this claim is uncertain. By at least the sixteenth century, it was in the Dormition Cathedral in Moscow where it remained until it was moved to the State Tretyakov Gallery after the Russian Revolution.

It was subject to an ownership dispute in the 1990s between the gallery and Moscow Patriarchate, which ended with its relocation to the Church of St. Nicholas in Tolmachi. An arrangement was made to operate the church with dual status as a house church and part of the museum. The icon was only accessible via an underground passage from the gallery to the church, where liturgies are still held.

On 3 April 2026, the Vladimir icon was transferred to the Cathedral of Christ the Saviour in Moscow; the Russian Orthodox Church has free use of the icon for forty-nine years.

== History ==
=== Origins ===
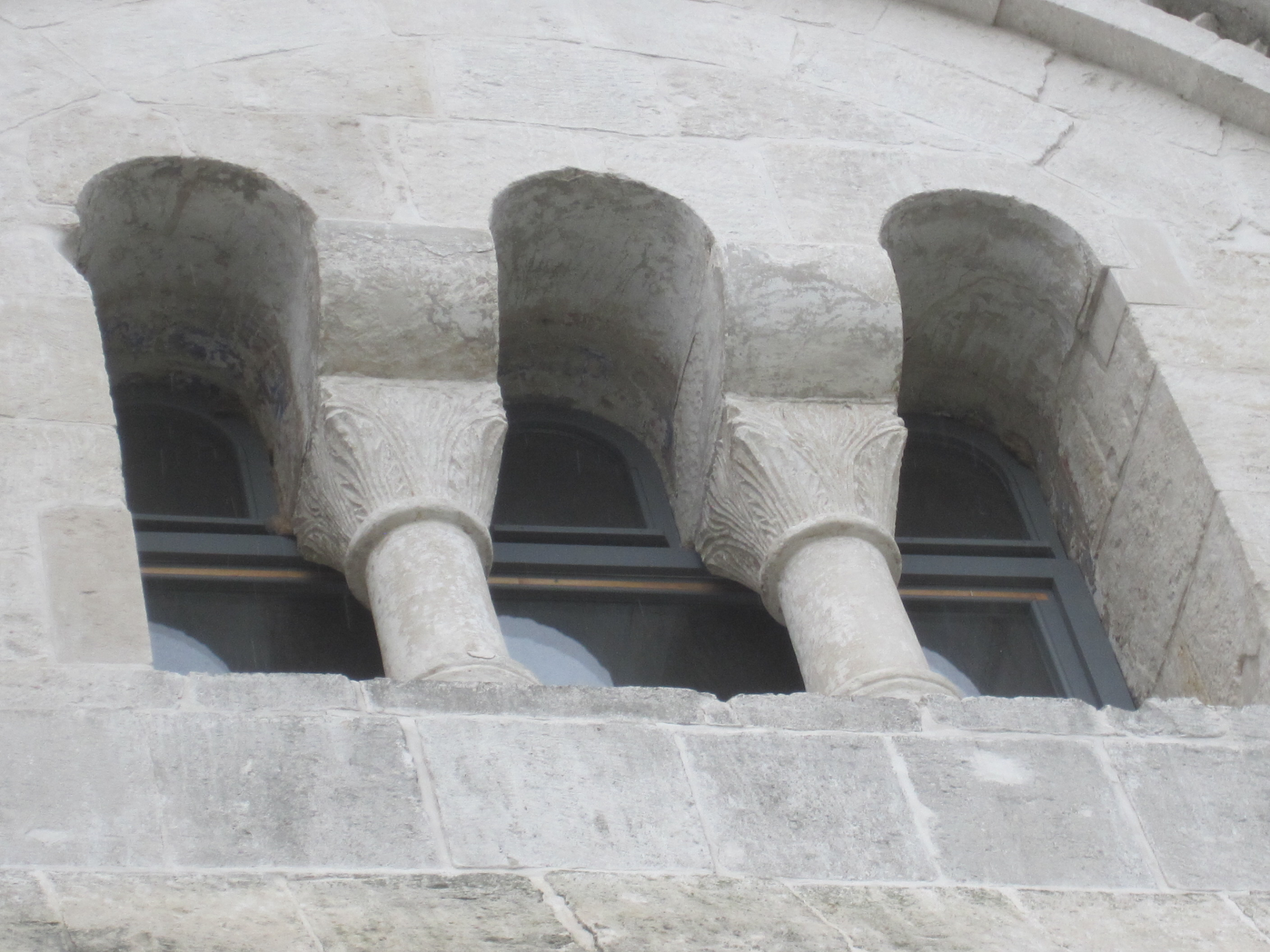
The surviving portion of the Bogolyubovo Castle

The icon is dated to the earlier part of the 12th century, and arrived in Rus' around 1131. This is consistent with accounts given in Rus' chronicles. Similar to other high quality Byzantine works of art, it is thought to have been painted in Constantinople. Only the faces are original, with the clothes repainted after suffering damage when a metal cover or riza was placed over them and in a fire in 1195.

In about 1131, the Greek Patriarch of Constantinople sent the icon as a gift to grand prince Yuri Dolgorukiy of Kiev. Academic Sona Hoisington attributes this in part to a greater effort by Byzantines to convert and Christianize the Slavic peoples at the time. It was kept in a Vyshhorod nunnery until Yuri's son, Andrey of Bogolyubovo, brought it to Vladimir in 1155.

In a traditional account the horses transporting the icon had stopped near Vladimir and refused to go further. Accordingly, many people of Rus interpreted this as a sign that the Theotokos (Note: Greek for Virgin Mary, literally meaning "Birth-Giver of God") wanted the icon to stay there. The place was named Bogolyubovo, or "the one loved by God". Andrey placed it in his Bogolyubovo residence and built the Assumption Cathedral to legitimize his claim that Vladimir had replaced Kiev as the principal city of Rus. The icon was soon moved to the Assumption Cathedral after its consecration in 1160.

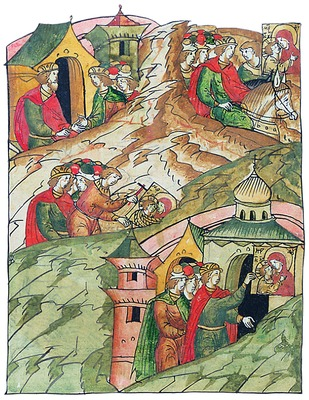
Prince Andrew removing the icon from a convent in Vyshhorod. A miniature from the Illustrated Chronicle of Ivan the Terrible

Following the consecration of the Assumption Cathedral, which was soon followed by other churches dedicated to the Virgin, there is no record of the icon ever leaving Vladimir until 1395. However, its presence did not prevent the sack and burning of the city by the Mongols in 1238, when the icon was damaged in the fire. It was restored soon after the event, and again in 1431 and in 1512.

=== Transfer to Moscow ===
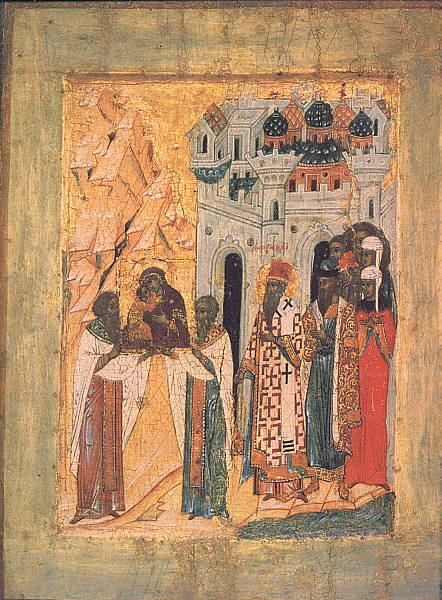
This sixteenth century icon shows Metropolitan Cyprian and Vasily I welcoming the Vladimir icon in Moscow

A legend formed that the icon was painted by Luke the Evangelist from life; the first written account of this story dates back to 1512. The intercession of the Theotokos through the image has also been credited with saving Moscow from Tatar hordes in 1451 and 1480.

The image was brought from Vladimir to Moscow in 1395, during Tamerlane's invasion. The site where the Muscovites met the Vladimir delegation is commemorated by the Sretensky Monastery (Note: "Sretenie" being the Church Slavonic term for "meeting".) which is considered to be built where it occurred. However, no archeological evidence supports this claim, and much of the fifteenth-to-sixteenth century church was destroyed after renovations by the Russian Orthodox Church. Vasily I of Moscow spent a night crying over the icon, and Tamerlane's armies retreated the same day. The Muscovites refused to return the icon to Vladimir and placed it in the Dormition Cathedral of the Moscow Kremlin.

David Miller suggests that the icon was in fact normally still in Vladimir, with some excursions to Moscow, until the 1520s. Crediting the icon with saving Moscow in 1395 does not appear in sources until the late 15th century and the full version of the story until accounts of 1512 and then the 1560s. From the 16th century, the Vladimirskaya began to be featured as an important symbol in a series of politicized legends linking Moscow to pre-Mongol Rus and positioning it as the centre of Christianity after Rome and Byzantium—initially to sustain the imperial pretensions of Ivan IV, and later to influence state policy under the Riurikid and Romanov dynasties.

=== Post-revolution ===
Under the Bolsheviks, the icon came into the possession of the State Tretyakov Gallery. Displayed as a work of art, it was first put on display in the gallery in 1930 and kept there for at least the next 11 years. During the Battle of Moscow, Joseph Stalin allegedly had the icon flown around the city as the Germans began to invade. This was first described by Moscow city official Viktor Volokhov in his 2012 book Муниципальная милиция в Российской Федерации.

In 1993, it was moved to the Epiphany Cathedral for a Divine Liturgy in the wake of tensions between President Boris Yeltsin and the Russian Duma. Though it was damaged during the excursion, it was soon restored and given to the Church of St. Nicholas in Tolmachi.

== Description ==
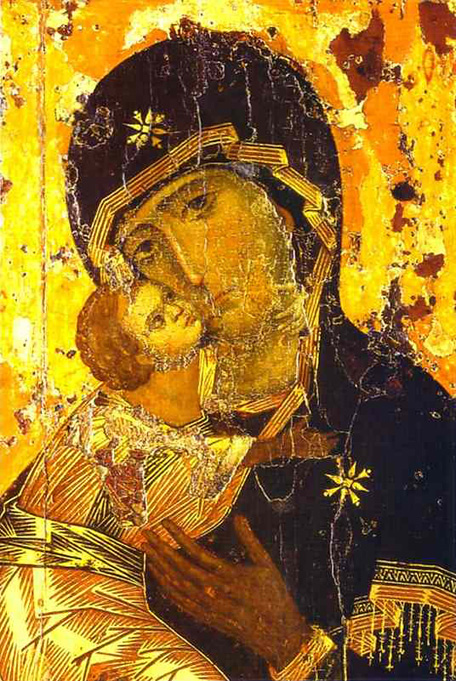
Details of Our lady of Vladimir icon

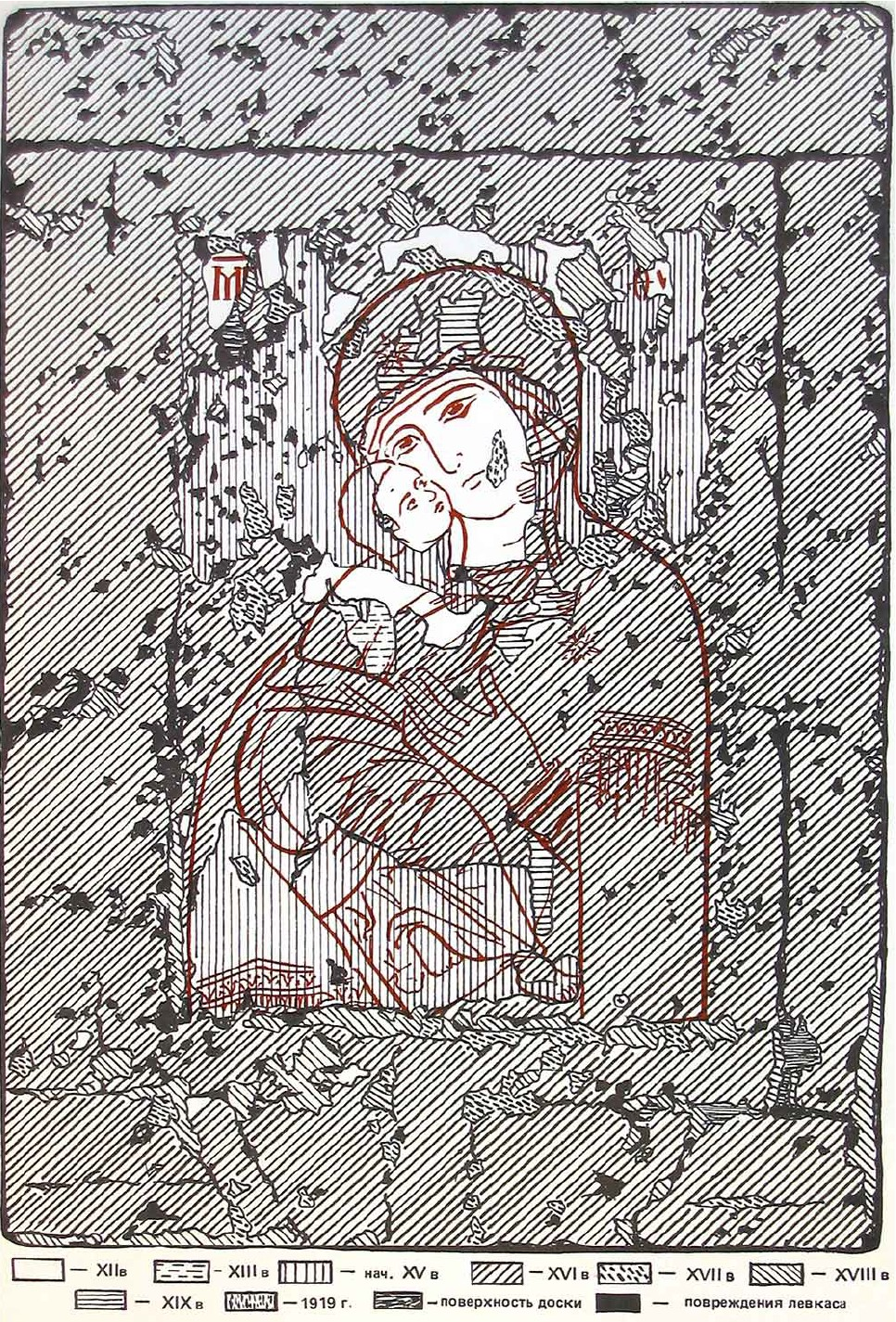
Various stages of damage to and restoration of the icon, as analyzed by A. I. Anisimov

The icon is a tempera painting on wood, 106 by 69 centimetres (42 in × 27 in) in size, with the central 78 by 55 centimetres (31 in × 22 in) portion being original and the rest being a later expansion undertaken possibly to accommodate a larger riza. The icon depicts Jesus Christ as a child being held in the arms of his mother, Mary. They embrace cheek to cheek, with the child gazing towards and reaching for Mary. She holds him with one arm and solemnly looks out towards the viewer. The faces and hands are painted with greenish olive sankir, a mix of ochre pigment and soot, and transparent layers of brighter ochre; the child's face is rendered in a lighter shade than the mother's, perhaps to reflect the difference in their age. The child's clothes are painted with dark ochre and gold. The original painting bore the inscription ΜΡ ΘΥ, an abbreviation for 'Mother of God', of which only parts survive.

In its nine centuries of existence, the icon has been restored and overpainted at least five times to deal with damage and deterioration, including a fifteenth century restoration thought to have been led by Andrei Rublev. It is mainly the faces of Mary and Jesus and the gold ground above her head that are original twelfth-century paint. In the past, the icon has been covered with several elaborately designed oklad and riza (revetments) which caused damage to the frame. The reverse, which is much less well known, contains an image of the Hetoimasia ('prepared throne') and instruments of Christ's Passion that was painted in c. 14th century (prior to that the reverse side had a painting of an unidentified saint).

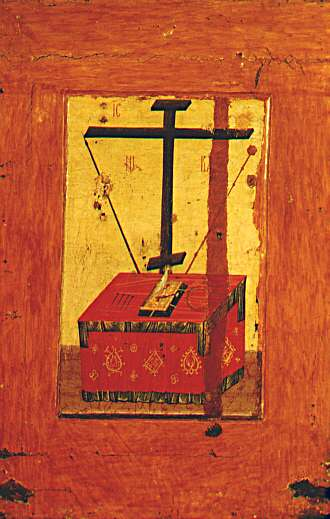
Hetoimasia and instruments of Christ's Passion painted on the reverse side of the icon, c. 14th century

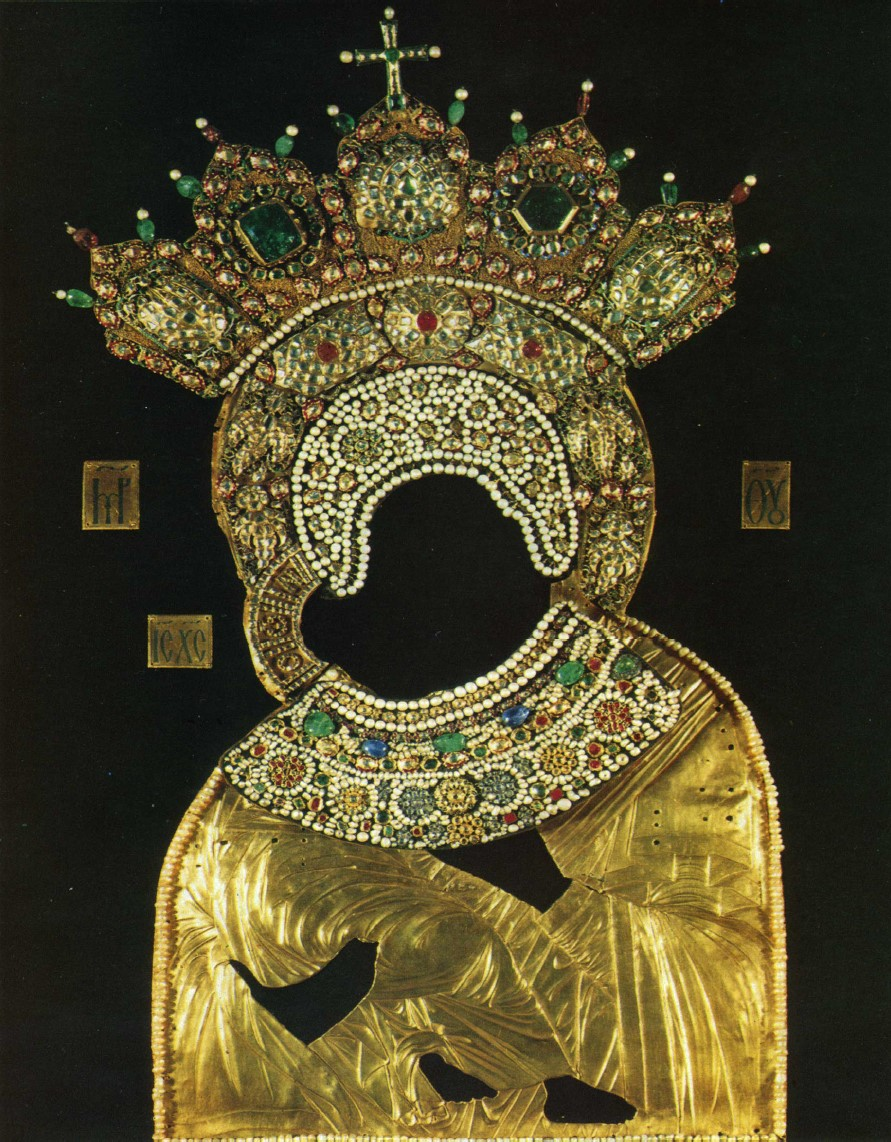
A riza for the icon dating to 1657

Among icons of Virgin Mary with Jesus, Our lady of Vladimir is classed as an Eleusa icon (Russian: Oumilenie), due to the tender attachment between mother and child. Theologians and believers have also commented upon the icons symbology and the religious sentiments it inspires. Contemplating the icon, theologian Henri Nouwen, remarked that the Virgin's eyes glance at neither the child or the viewer but appear to "look inward and outward at once"; that her free hand gestures towards the baby to "open a space for us to approach Jesus without fear"; and, that the child is shown as "a wise man dressed in adult clothes." Literary scholar, S. S. Averintsev interpreted the mix of maternal tenderness and poignant sorrow seen in Mary's expression, as representative of the emotions generated by the events of Nativity and Calvary, respectively. Jesus's bare feet are seen as symbolizing his physical reality; his garments of gold, the Kingdom of Heaven; and the three stars on Mary's dress (one occluded by the child), "her virginity before, during and after her son's birth."

Its artistic quality has been highly praised. Art historian David Talbot Rice said that "[Our Lady of Vladimir] ...is admitted by all who have seen it to be one of the most outstanding religious paintings of the world." Art historian George Heard Hamilton praises its "craftsmanship and conception", and notes how in its representation of the subject's faces, the icon subtly transitions from its normal use of contour lines to a refined surface texture. It is painted in an artistic style typical for Byzantine art of the period with features including smaller mouths, refined eyes, and elongating Mary's nose. However, by avoiding the use of demarcating line, as became common in later Byzantine art, and by setting up the complex interplay of the mother and child's glances, the icon adds to the illusion of life in the piece. The child's features are reminiscent of classical sculpture, though the artist renders an expression truer to an actual infant's. The expressive and humanistic character of the icon differentiates it from earlier Byzantine art and exemplify the artistic developments seen during the Komnenos dynasty.

== Significance ==
=== In Russian history ===
The icon is generally considered to be one of the most cherished symbols in Russian history. Academic David Miller has ascribed this to its close connection to Russian national consciousness throughout its existence. Its transfer from Kiev to Vladimir was used by Bogolyubsky to legitimize Vladimir's claim as the new center of government in Kievan Rus'.

Additionally, its intimate association with important Russian historical events gave Our Lady of Vladimir the distinction of being a national palladium. The most recent of these events being the 1993 Russian constitutional crisis when it was brought to the Epiphany Cathedral at the request of Patriarch Alexy II and Mayor of Moscow Yury Luzhkov in their attempt to bring peace to the country.

=== As a religious icon ===
Our Lady of Vladimir's veneration is also likely enhanced by the fact that the Theotokos is regarded as the holy protectress of Russia. The venerated image has been used in celebration of coronations of tsars, elections of patriarchs, and other important ceremonies of state. The icon has three feast days held throughout the year in celebration to specific events it is associated with:

- 3 June [O.S. 21 May] (Note: The dates provided are in both old and new style. The canonical dates for the feast days are in old style because the Russian Orthodox Church uses the Julian calendar. See Gregorian calendar § Difference between Gregorian and Julian calendar dates.) to celebrate Moscow's protection from Crimean Khan Mehmed Giray in 1521.
- 6 July [O.S. 23 June] for, in 1480, for their victory against Khan Ahmed during the Great Stand on the Ugra River.
- 8 September [O.S. 26 August] to commemorate the Muscovite deliverance from pending invasion by Tamerlane.

== Location and display ==
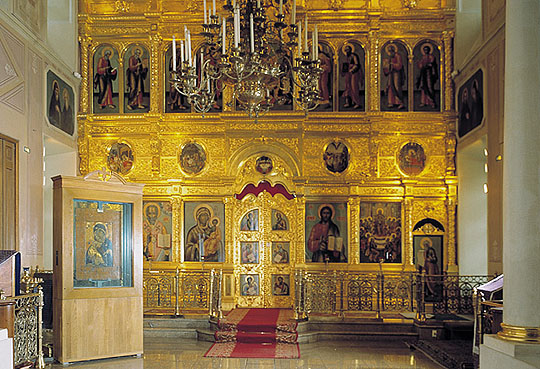
Our Lady of Vladimir on display within the church

Our Lady of Vladimir was on display at the Church of St. Nicholas in Tolmachi. As a result of an agreement between the Tretyakov and Moscow Patriarchate, the church is both an active Russian Orthodox house church and functioning museum. Previously, there had been a contentious ownership dispute between the two.

In 1997, the Tretyakov completed a full restoration of the church. Security improvements to store and display art were added, and an underground passageway was additionally made to connect it to the State Tretyakov Gallery. In order to house the famous icon, a temperature controlled bulletproof glass case was commissioned. On 7 September 1996, Our Lady of Vladimir was first installed in the special case located within the church, and the next day Patriarch Alexy II consecrated the church. According to Archpriest Nikolai Sokolov, the rector for the church, the case would able to withstand the firing of a Kalashnikov rifle as well as many other potential hazards.

Due to its dual status as both church and museum, visitors are allowed to pray before the icon and divine Liturgies are regularly held on selected days. However, visitors can only enter the church through the Tretyakov Gallery and via the underground passageway.

On 3 April 2026, on the eve of the Feast of the Entry of the Lord into Jerusalem, the Vladimir Icon of the Mother of God was transferred from the State Tretyakov Gallery to the custody of the Russian Orthodox Church, which has free use of the icon for a period of forty-nine years. On 4 April, the icon was displayed for public veneration at the Cathedral of Christ the Saviour. The Vladimir icon remains the property of the Russian Federation and the operational management of the State Tretyakov Gallery.

== Copies and influence ==
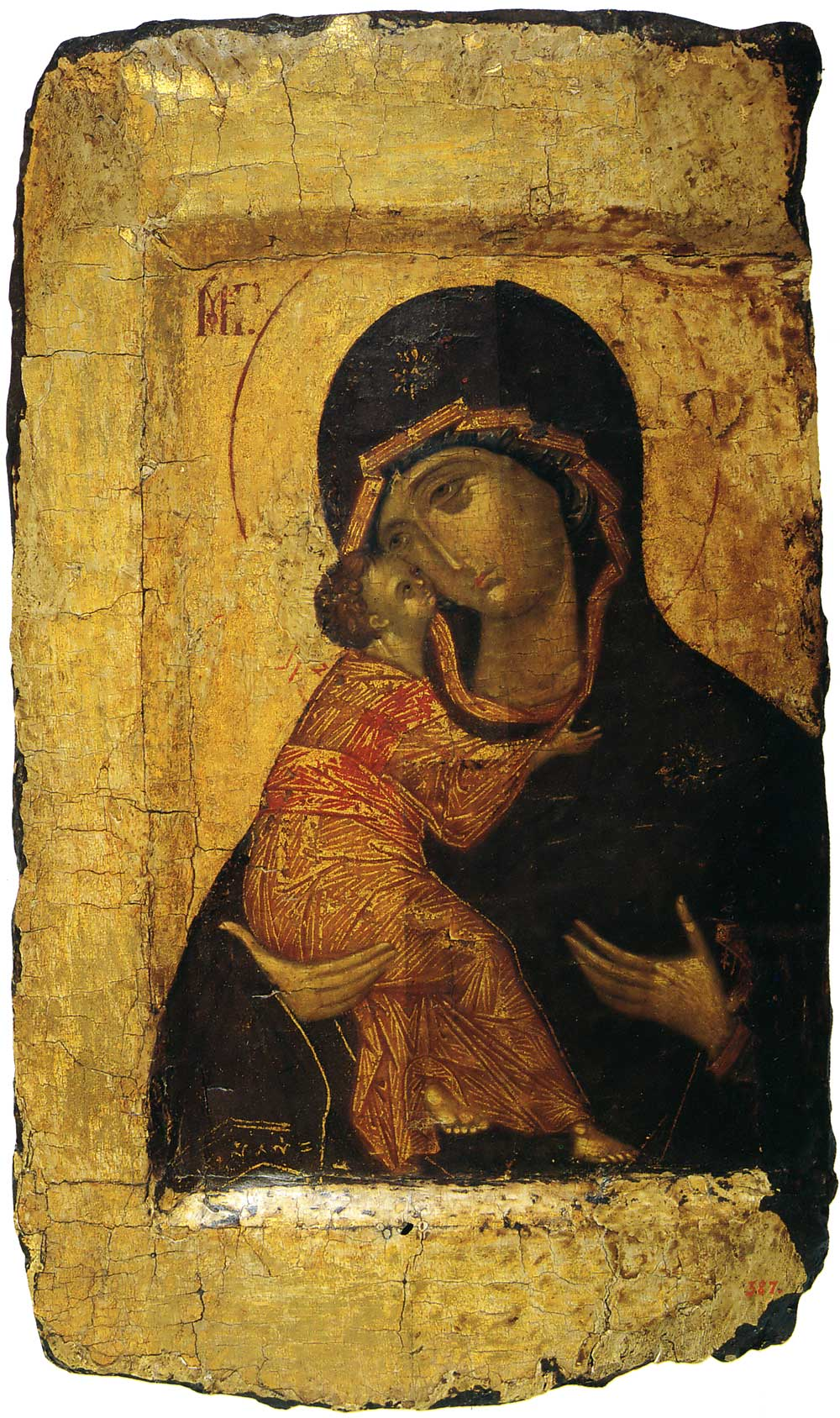
Fifteenth century copy, sometimes attributed to Andrei Rublev

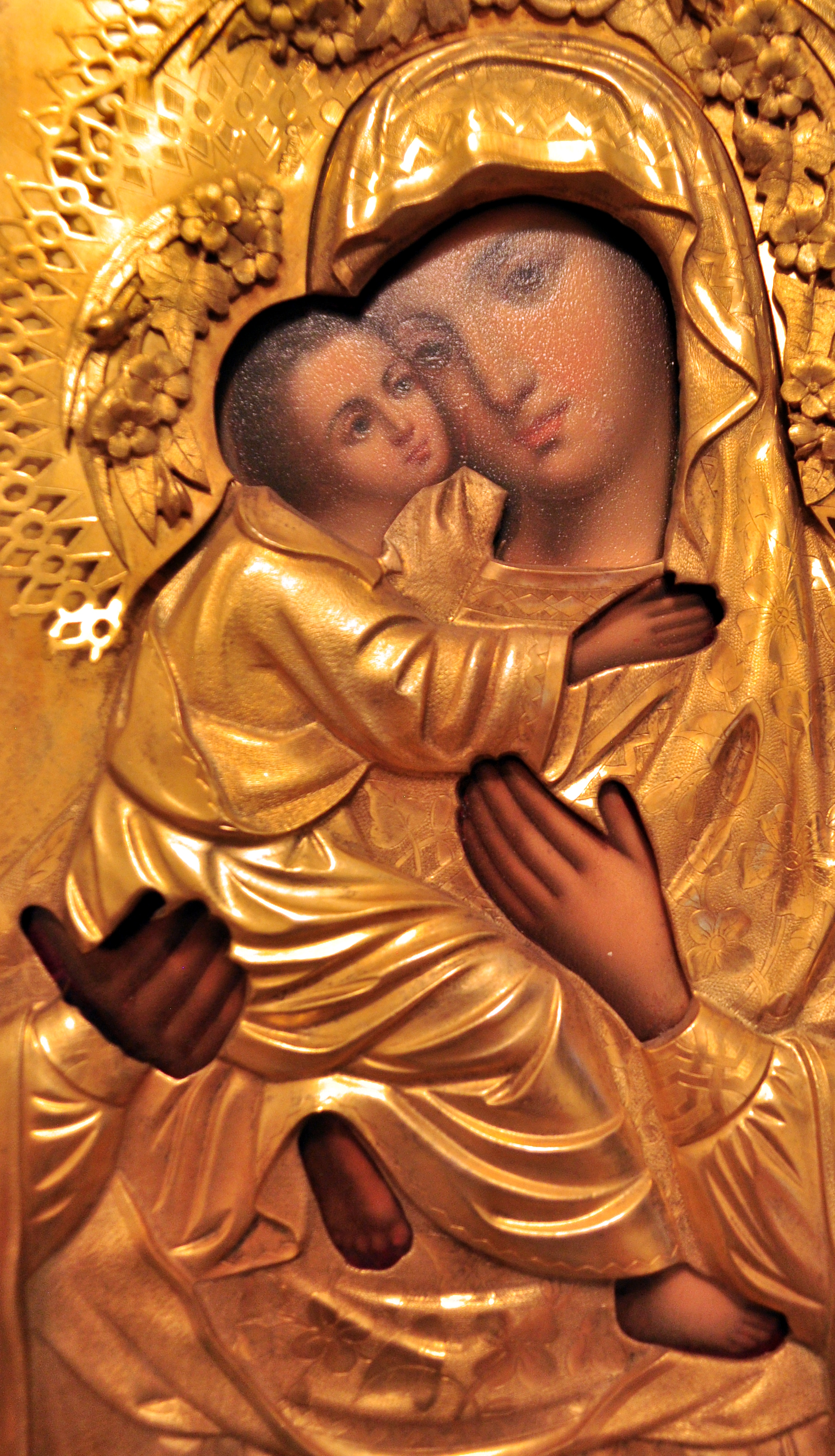
A late nineteenth century copy largely covered with riza (revetments)

Even more than most, the original icon has been repeatedly duplicated for centuries, and many copies also have considerable artistic and religious significance of their own. According to Suzanne Massie, it became a standard for many Russian contemporary depictions of Mary.

In preparation for the 1980 Summer Olympics, a chapel was constructed for athletes to be able to pray before competition which hosted a copy of the icon.

== See also ==
- Our Lady of Vladimir Church – a church in St. Petersburg dedicated to the icon
- List of oldest Russian icons
- Icon Productions – Australian-American production company owned (partially) by Mel Gibson, that uses a detail from the icon as the company logo.
