= Saint Peter and Paul Orthodox Church in Hong Kong =

Russian Orthodox church in Hong Kong

The Saint Peter and Paul Orthodox Church in Hong Kong (Russian: Храм Святых Апостолов Петра и Павла; Chinese: 香港聖彼得聖保羅東正教堂) is an Orthodox house church in Sheung Wan, Hong Kong. It belongs to the jurisdiction of the Russian Orthodox Church.
