= Church of St. Nicholas in Tolmachi =

- Храм Святителя Николая в Толмачах
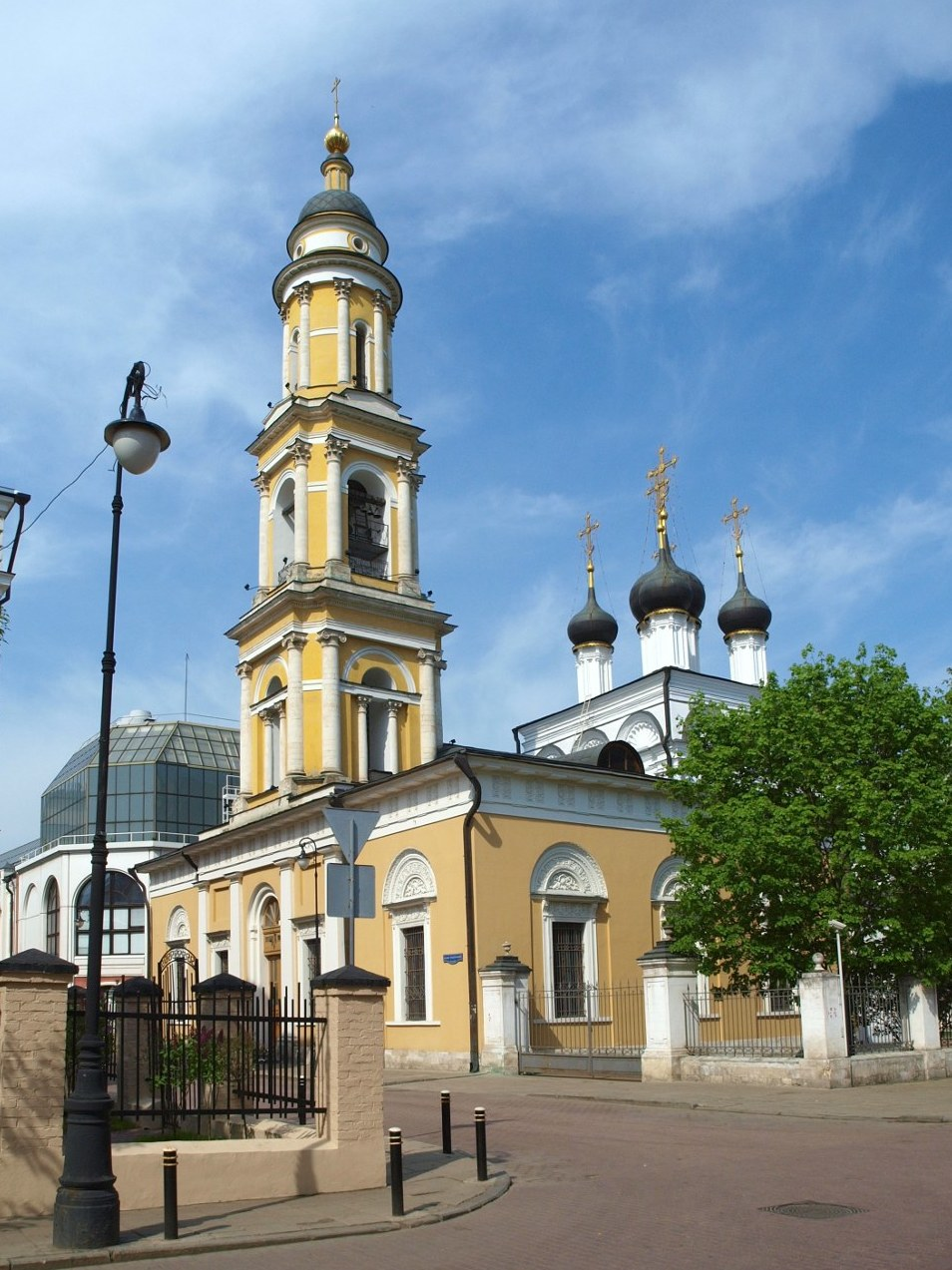

- Location within Moscow
- 55°44′27″N 37°37′13″E
- Location: Moscow, Russia
- Denomination: Russian Orthodox
- Website: hramvtolmachah.ru

History
- Status: House church, museum

Administration
- Diocese: Urban Diocese of Moscow
- Deanery: Moskvoretsky deanery

The Church of St. Nicholas in Tolmachi (Russian: Храм Святителя Николая в Толмачах, romanized: Khram Svyatityelya Nikolaya v Tolmachakh) is both a Russian Orthodox house church and museum that is part of the State Tretyakov Gallery located in Moscow. The church is home to several religious relics and icons; it housed the culturally important Our Lady of Vladimir icon until 3 April 2026.

First mentioned in 1625 when it was a wooden church, the Church of St. Nicholas in Tolmachi has since undergone several reconstructions and restorations. The church was ultimately closed in 1929 and became a neglected art storage house. Liturgical services were resumed after a unique arrangement between the Patriarchate and the gallery was agreed upon in 1993.

== Background ==
=== Affiliations ===
As a house church, the Church of St. Nicholas in Tolmachi is affiliated with both the State Tretyakov Gallery and the Moscow Patriarchate. The modern church functions both as a parish for the gallery's employees and as a museum open to the public. While active services are still held in the church, visitors can only enter the church through the Tretyakov Gallery. Religious artifacts are preserved in special climate-controlled environments to ensure their preservation.

Within the Russian Orthodox Church, the Church of St. Nicholas in Tolmachi is under Moskvoretsky deanery and the Urban Diocese of Moscow.

=== Name ===
The church's name derives from the Old Tolmachi settlement of Tatar translators located in what is now Old Tolmachevsky Lane in Moscow. These translators originally migrated to the area to serve the Golden Horde during the time of the Tatar Yoke.

== History ==
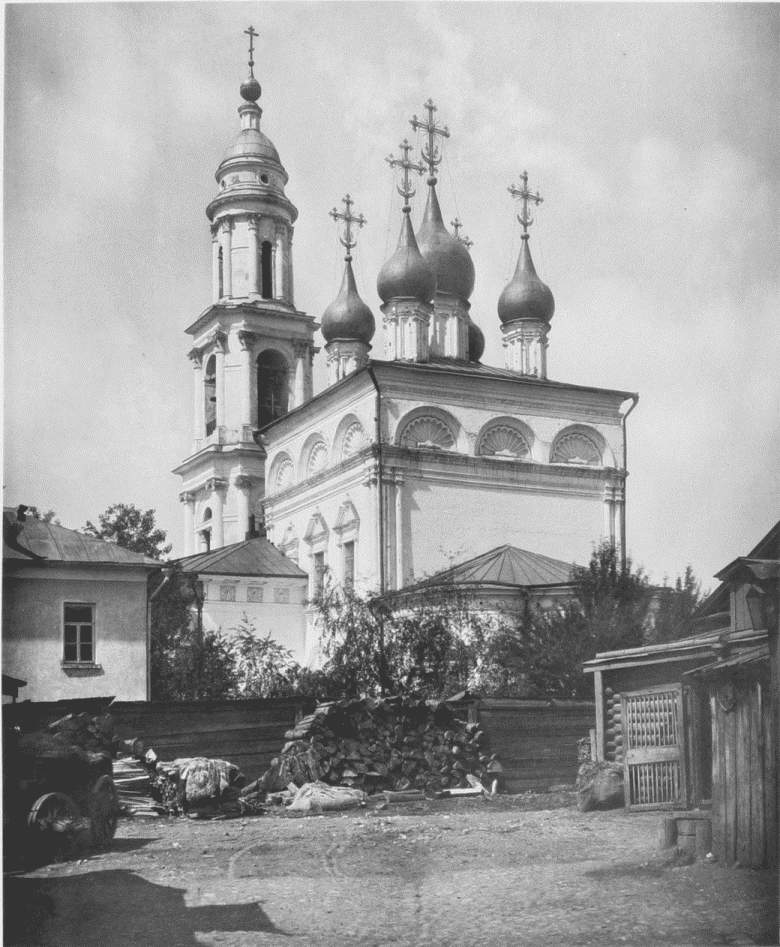
A photo of the church taken in 1883

=== Beginnings ===
The initial version of the church was wooden, as mentioned in a 1625 parish book. In March 1687, Patriarch Joachim visited the church for mass, which generally indicated the parish had nobles and highly regarded individuals as members. In 1697, a parishioner of the Resurrection Church in Kadashi, Longin Dobrynin, built the five-domed stone church in place of the wooden one.

Through the effort of Ekaterina Lazarevna Demidova, the Pokrovsky chapel was erected in 1770. Demidova, a widow, sought to consecrate a chapel in the name of the Virgin Mary despite the prevailing ban on consecrating altars in her name. At the time, the Russian Orthodox Church preferred those honoring Mary to dedicate to one of her feast days. Consequently, Demidova chose to dedicate the chapel to the Feast of the Intercession, and it was dedicated the same year it was built. However, in commemoration of her initial desire for the temple to honor Mary, the icon "Satisfy My Sorrows", which Demidova had originally wanted for the chapel, was later installed.

=== Misfortune and eventual closure ===
It was around this time that the church's parish was hit with tragedy twice over. Firstly, during the time of the chapel's construction, the 1770–1772 Russian plague had caused much destruction in its wake. Secondly, during the French invasion of Russia much of the surrounding buildings were destroyed in a fire as Moscow was razed. Though the Church of St. Nicholas itself survived in principle, this was not without cost. The priest at the time, John Andreev, was killed by the invading French forces while trying to protect it.

With the permission of metropolitan bishop Philaret of Moscow, a new bell tower was added in 1834 along with a reconstructed refectory. In the prior year, the old bell tower had proven to be deficient after more than 150 years of use, so Philaret approved the request by the parish to install the new one as well as begin general reconstruction on the main building so long as the main church remain "in an ancient dispensation". For this task, the services of the premier architect F. M. Shestakov, who helped to build the Greater Church of the Ascension, were successfully sought. When the new bell tower and refectory were completed, Philaret delivered a sermon to consecrate the Church of St. Nicholas. Though they would not last, the walls at this time were lined with artificial marble, but due to persistent staining they had to be covered up with wall paintings.

The general reconstruction of the church would last more than 20 years until October 1858.

Several years after the Russian Revolution, the church was in a poor state of affairs under the Soviet rule. Following the death of the former rector of the church, Elder Alexy Zosimovsky, the church closed down in the Easter of 1929. It was soon transferred to the Tretyakov Gallery which used the church as a storehouse and let it come under disrepair. The top of the bell tower became broken, and bells separated into pieces. By the time the gallery began major restoration work on the church in 1983, the temple had remained empty for over 50 years. Yet by the turn of the decade, the bell tower was able to be fully restored.

=== Reopening ===
It was not until 1993 that the temple was reopened for worship after an arrangement was made between the Russian Orthodox Church and the state gallery.

In September 1996, the church's restored main altar was sanctified by Patriarch Alexy II of Moscow. A year later, restorations for the building were completed, and it became an active house church almost exactly 300 years after it was first constituted in stone. Security improvements to store and display art were added during this process, and an underground passageway was additionally made to connect it to the State Tretyakov Gallery.

== Recent usage ==
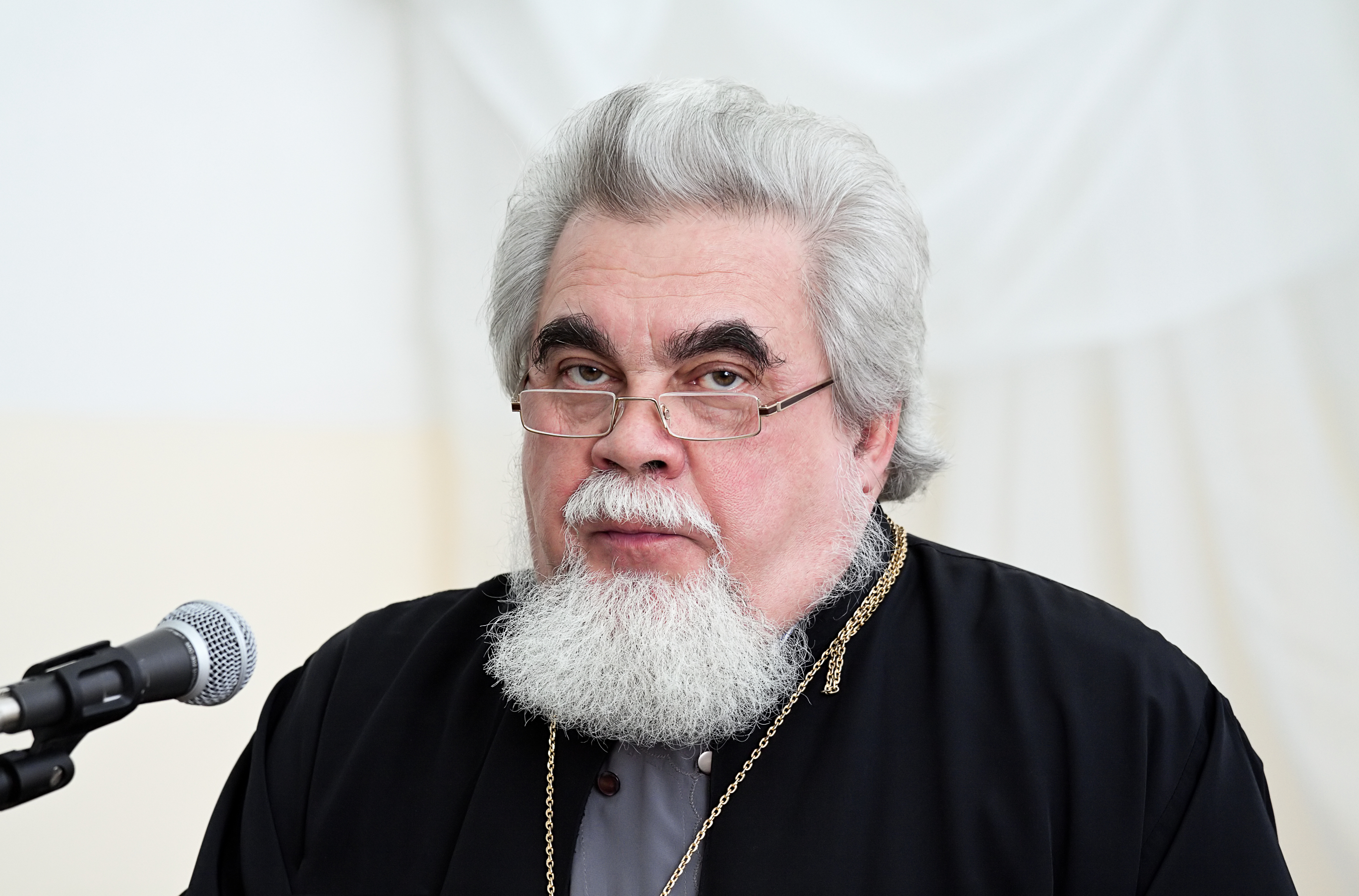
Archpriest Nikolai Sokolov

In 2009, the Iverskaya icon was transferred to the church from the gallery. It had been previously located within the Iverskaya Chapel before it was destroyed in 1929. The Trinity is stored in the church as well during the Feast for Holy Trinity. On 12 December 2012, the Tretyakov Gallery elected to transfer the relics of more than 30 saints to the church.

The church was most famously home to the Russian icon known as Our Lady of Vladimir. The icon is generally considered to be one of the most cherished symbols in Russian history. On 3 April 2026, the icon was transferred to Christ the Savior Russian Orthodox Cathedral in Moscow; the Russian Orthodox Church has free us of the icon for 49 years.

As of 2018, Archpriest Nikolai Sokolov is the rector for the Church of St. Nicholas in Tolmachi.

== See also ==
- St. Nicholas Church (disambiguation) – for a list of churches dedicated to Saint Nicholas the Wonderworker
- List of churches in Moscow – for a list of churches within Moscow
