= Alexander Kushelev-Bezborodko =

Russian politician

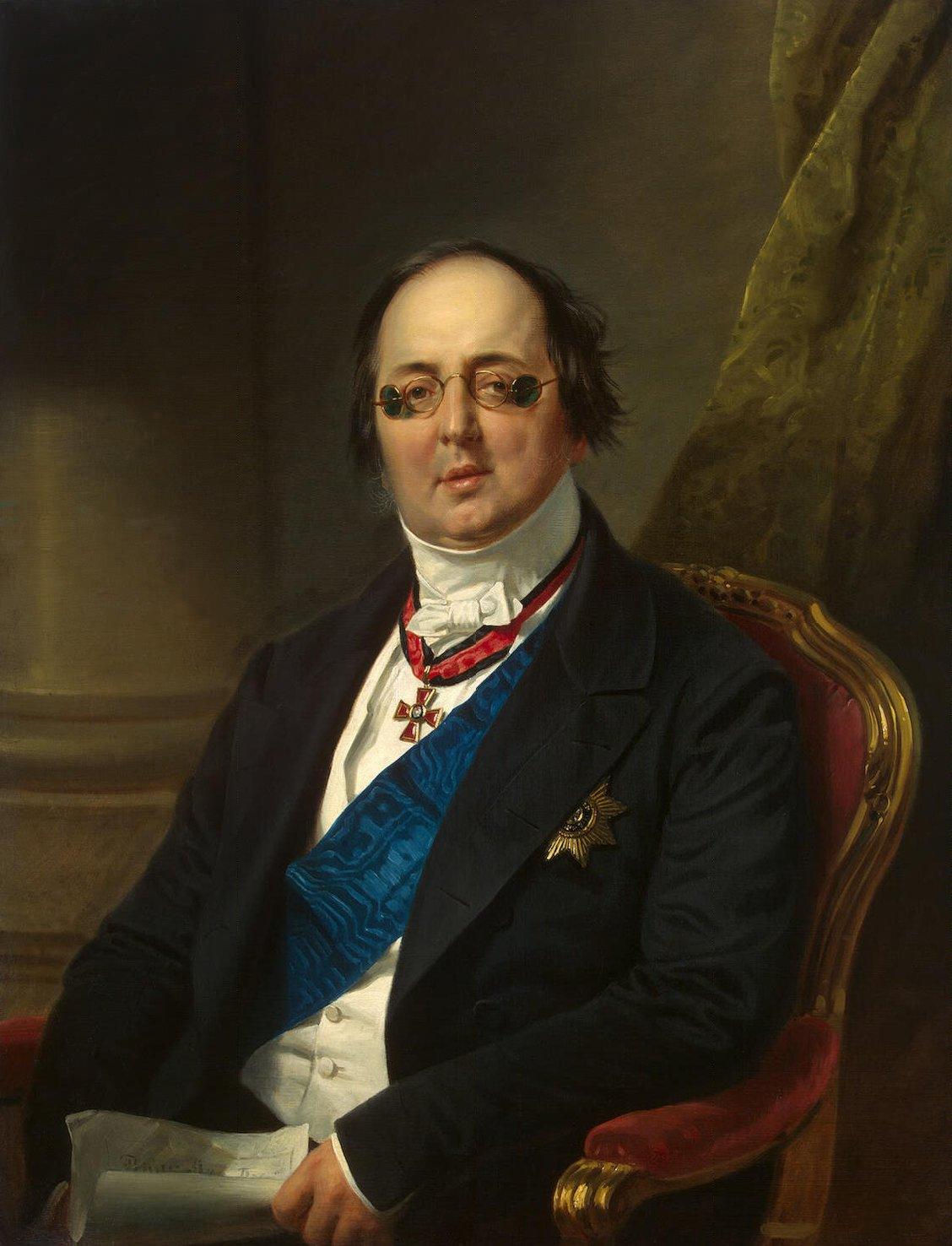
Kušelev-Bezborodko by Franz Krüger, 1850–1851.

Count Alexander Grigorovich Kushelev-Bezborodko (Russian: Александр Григорьевич Кушелев-Безбородко; 4 September 1800, St. Petersburg - 6 April 1855, Moscow) was a Russian Imperial nobleman and politician.

== Life ==
His parents were Grigori Grigorovich Kushelev (1754-1833) and his wife Ljubov' Il'inična Bezborodko (1783-1809). He was strongly influenced by his aunt, princess Lobanov-Rostov. In 1813 he began studying at the Tsarskoye Selo Lyceum. After graduating he left St Petersburg for Tartu (where he met Georg Friedrich Parrot) and Berlin (where he inspected the University). He regularly kept his father informed of his findings by letter. He later returned to St Petersburg, where he was made a chamberlain in 1820. He was elected an honorary member of the Russian Academy of Sciences in 1830 and seven years later was made director of the Treasury Department. In 1844 he became a senator and three years later an honorary trustee. From 13 March 1854 to his death he was Controller of State. He was buried in the Alexander Nevsky Monastery.

== Marriage and issue ==
On 30 January 1829 he married Aleksandra Nikolaevna Repnina-Volkonskaja (1805-1836), daughter of Nikolai Repnin-Volkonsky and Varvara Alekseevna Razumovskaja. They had five children:

- Varvara Alexandrovna (1829–1896), married Pëtr Arkadievič Kočubej, six children
- Alexandra Alexandrovna (1830–1833)
- Grigori Alexandrovich (1832–1870)
- Lyubov Aleksandrovna (1833-1913), married Aleksej Ivanovič Musin-Puškin
- Nikolai Alexandrovich (1834–1862), married Elizaveta Ivanovna Bazilevskaja

== Sources ==
- http://realty.lenta.ru/news/2011/12/23/dar/
- https://ru.wikisource.org/wiki/%D0%A0%D1%83%D1%81%D1%81%D0%BA%D0%B8%D0%B9_%D0%B1%D0%B8%D0%BE%D0%B3%D1%80%D0%B0%D1%84%D0%B8%D1%87%D0%B5%D1%81%D0%BA%D0%B8%D0%B9_%D1%81%D0%BB%D0%BE%D0%B2%D0%B0%D1%80%D1%8C
