= Yekaterina Samoylova =

Russian lady in waiting

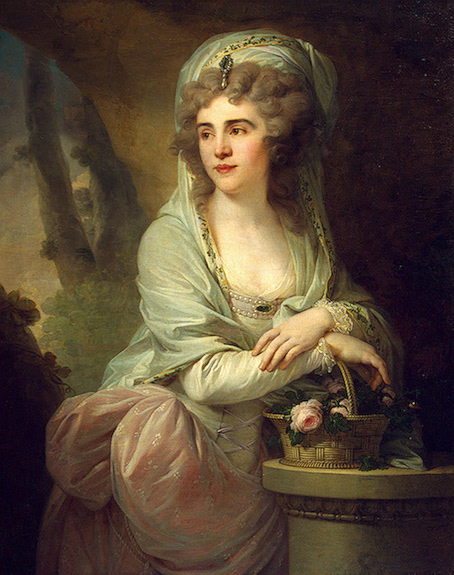
Yekaterina Samoylova

Yekaterina Samoylova (2 October 1763– 21 February 1830) was a Russian noble and lady-in-waiting to Catherine the Great. She was a leading figure of Saint Petersburg society and frequently mentioned in the literature, diaries and memoirs of the period.

She was the daughter of prince Sergey Alekseyevich Trubetskoy and Yelena Nesvitskaya and in 1786 married General count Aleksandr Samoylov, nephew of Potemkin. In 1782 she became one of Empress Catherine the Great's ladies-in-waiting. During her stay with her spouse in Bender in 1787–91, she was rumoured to have had an affair with Potemkin. She was the role model of the capital's aristocracy, known for her love affairs — some of her children were not considered to have been her husband's — and for setting fashion trends.
