= Nikolai Kushelev-Bezborodko =

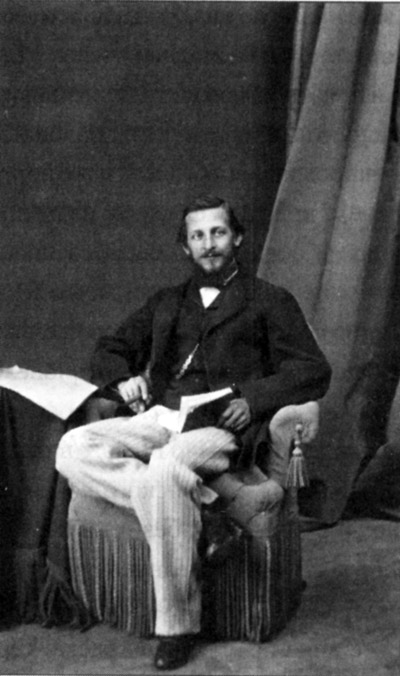
Kushelev-Bezborodko

Nikolai Alexandrovich Kushelev-Bezborodko (Russian: Николай Александрович Кушелев-Безбородко; 28 November 1834—11 April 1862, Nice, France) was a Russian art collector.

== Life ==
His father was Alexander Kushelov-Bezborodko (1800–1855), senator, state controller, count and member of the Russian Academy of Sciences, whilst his mother was Alexander's wife Alexandra Nikolaevna née Princess Repnina-Volkonskaya. After his father's death he inherited half his estate and his art collection. At the end of the Crimean War he went on a trip to Europe, where he explored several museums and exhibitions and decided to expand his father's collection. He began to actively buy up contemporary paintings and sculptures, mainly from France and in large part directly from the artists or their dealers. In a very short time he managed to expand the collection significantly - despite (or perhaps because of) his lack of age, experience and knowledge he appreciated modern artists such as Théodore Rousseau, Jules Dupré, Delacroix, Jean-François Millet, Constant Troyon Courbet and Corot and brought the Barbizon school to the attention of Russian audiences.

He died suddenly in 1862 and his artworks were added to the collections of the museum at the Imperial Academy of Arts in St Petersburg, forming a distinct Kushelevskaya Gallery of over 500 paintings and sculptures. Between 1922 and 1923 almost the whole of this collection was transferred to the Hermitage Museum, from which some of the paintings were again transferred between 1923 and 1925 to the new Pushkin Museum. The Hermitage devoted an exhibition to the collection in 1993. Most of the paintings from the collection are now on display on the third floor of the General Staff Building as part of the 1800-1850 rooms, whilst a room opened on the fourth floor of the same building in 2017 devoted to the Barbizon School works from the collection.
