= House church (Russia) =

Type of parish in the Russian Orthodox Church

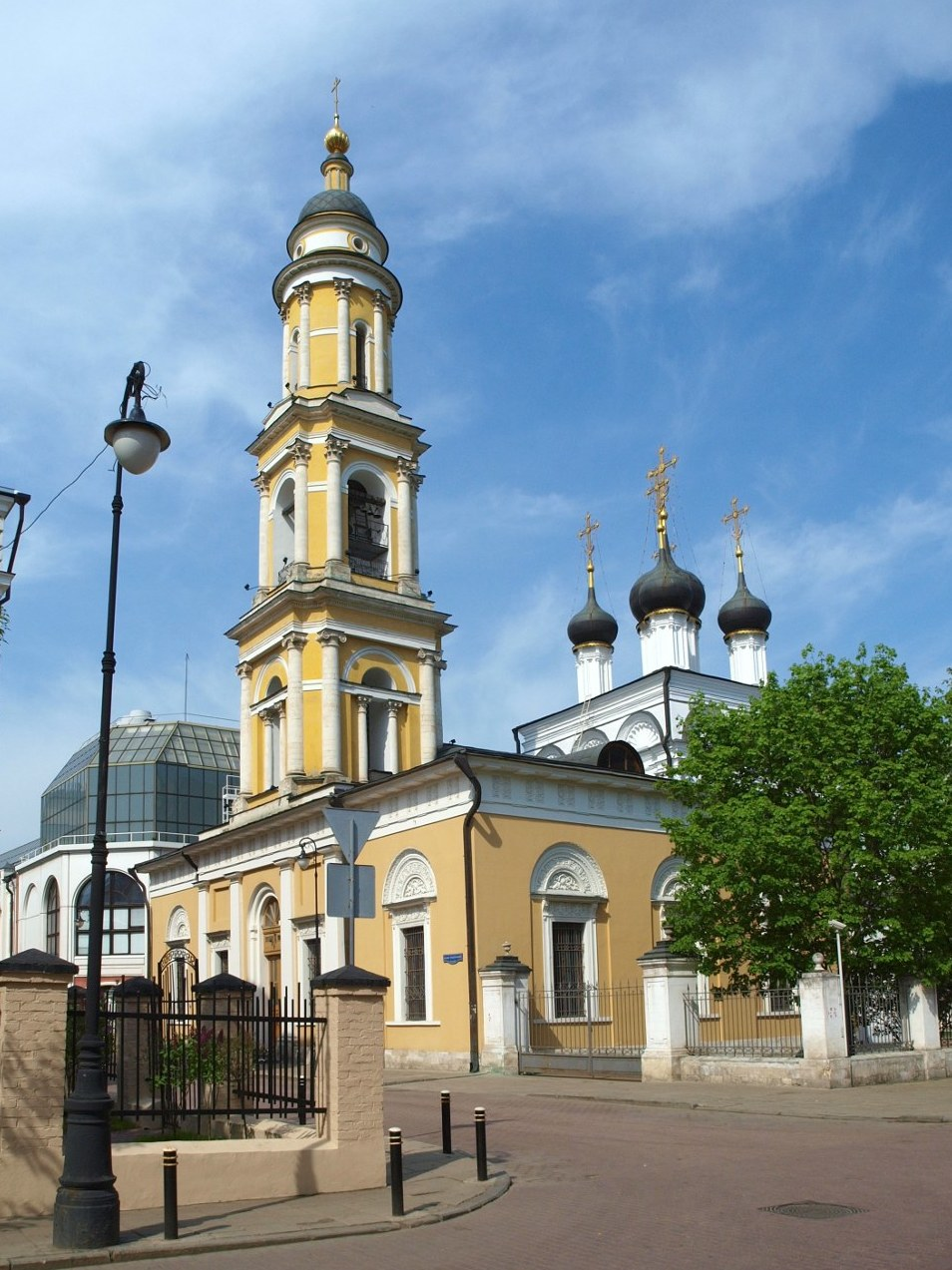
The Church of St. Nicholas in Tolmachi is a historic example of a house church that is affiliated with the Tretyakov Gallery

In the Russian Orthodox Church, a house church (Russian: домовая церковь) is a church parish that is intended for performing religious services for members of a particular institution. These particular churches are sometimes outside the jurisdiction of the corresponding territorial administrative unit.

== Overview ==
House churches can be attached to hospitals, orphanages, and other charitable organizations, but these types of churches can be seen as well within educational institutions like secondary schools and universities. They are intended for the religious participation of individuals staying at or studying within these host establishments.

== Background ==
The term house church can mean various things within Christianity and has historically not been applied universally to refer to a specific concept. Early Christian churches (Note: Also called New Testament churches) were generally found within the houses of individual worshipers. However, it can also be used to describe a church that operates under this or similar structures.

== History ==
Original house churches were not considered parishes but instead to have belonged to the private institution or person that owned the building. As they were not considered parishes, extensive records are not available of where they were located or how many of these churches existed. However, they were likely a popular source of attraction among Moscow's historical churches.

Following the Russian Revolution and the subsequently passed Decree on Separation of Church and State, all church property rights and legal identities were revoked entirely. While this severely impacted how regular parish churches operated, it did not have any effect on home churches which had neither property nor a separate legal identity from their host institutions to begin with and thus were effectively independent of the state. Ironically, the decree that was meant to hurt the freedoms of religious assembly ended up protecting them for house churches.

However this protection did not last, and in August 1918 the People's Commissariat sent instructions out that all house churches at educational institutions would mandatorily be closed (roughly 16% of all house churches). Despite being nominally limited to just house churches within schools and museums, the instruction was rigidly applied to effectively outlaw all house churches. While some house churches managed to convert to parish churches, others were not so fortunate. By the end of 1920, 13 house churches had been closed down and liquidated.

== Types ==
Main Church of the Armed Forces of Russia
- Главного храма Вооруженных Сил России
- Country: Russia
- Denomination: Russian Orthodox
- Website: https://hram.mil.ru/

Architecture
- Functional status: Planned
- Style: Russo-Byzantine

=== Within the military ===
The Russian Orthodox Church has frequently been tied to Russian military forces through its religious involvement in military life and as a means of promoting patriotism, from the time of the Tsardom of Russia to the present.

On 4 September 2018, Russian Defense Minister Sergey Shoygu announced plans for the construction of a cathedral to be located within Patriot Park outside Moscow. The church would be built by 2020 and would reportedly stand to honor the Soviet Union's victory over Nazi Germany in World War II. The cathedral is planned to be the world's third largest Orthodox church, and it will feature a Russo-Byzantine style of architecture.

A month later, Shoygu stated that the front steps of the church building will be made from former Nazi Germany military hardware which was captured and taken as trophies by the Red Army. The building is planned to be colored in a camouflage green, topped with six golden domes, and have several glass panels throughout.

A foundation called Voskreseniye was set up to collect funds from the public to build the planned cathedral. The head of Vokreseniye, Vladimir Bogatyryov, has stated that the cathedral will be used to train and educate so called war priests.

It will become the main cathedral of the armed forces, yet another symbol of our unflinching national traditions and our loyalty to the memory of our ancestors and their accomplishments for the benefit of the fatherland...

— Vladimir Putin, at the cornerstone consecration ceremony. (2018)

=== Within colleges ===
According to Vladimir V. Belokurov, vice rector at Moscow State University, house churches within educational institutions like colleges and universities are critical to the learning experience for students. In an interview with Tatyana's Day, (Note: The magazine is a student publication run out of Moscow State University's house church.) Belokurov cited their ability to raise spiritual and cultural awareness for individual students and their positive contributions to campus life.

== Current status ==
In 2005 there were 112 house churches within Moscow, but as of 2013 this number was 164.

== See also ==
- House church (China) – for house churches in Chinese Christendom
