= Kurakin =

Kurakin (feminine: Kurakina) is a Russian surname associate with the Russian noble Kurakin family. The surname comes from Turkic quraq, 'empty, greedy'.

Notable people with the surname include:

- Alexander Kurakin (1752–1818), Russian statesman and diplomat
- Alexander Kurakin (1697) (1697–1749) statesman and diplomat
- Alexandra Kurakina
- Alexey Kurakin (1759–1829), Russian statesman
- Antons Kurakins (born 1990), Latvian football defender
- Boris Kurakin (1676–1727), Russian statesman and diplomat
- Boris Kurakin (1733), Russian statesman, hofmeister, senator
- Boris Alekseevich Kurakin (1784–1850), Russian politician and diplomat
- Elena Kurakina
- Elizaveta Kurakina Naryshkina
- Julia Kurakina
- Juri Kurakin (born 1987), Estonian ice dancer, brother of Dmitri Kurakin
- Igor Kurakin (born 1963), Russian football player
- Natalia Kurakina (1766-1831), Russian composer, singer and noblewoman
- Pavel Kurakin (born 1966), Russian footballer
