= Kurakin family =

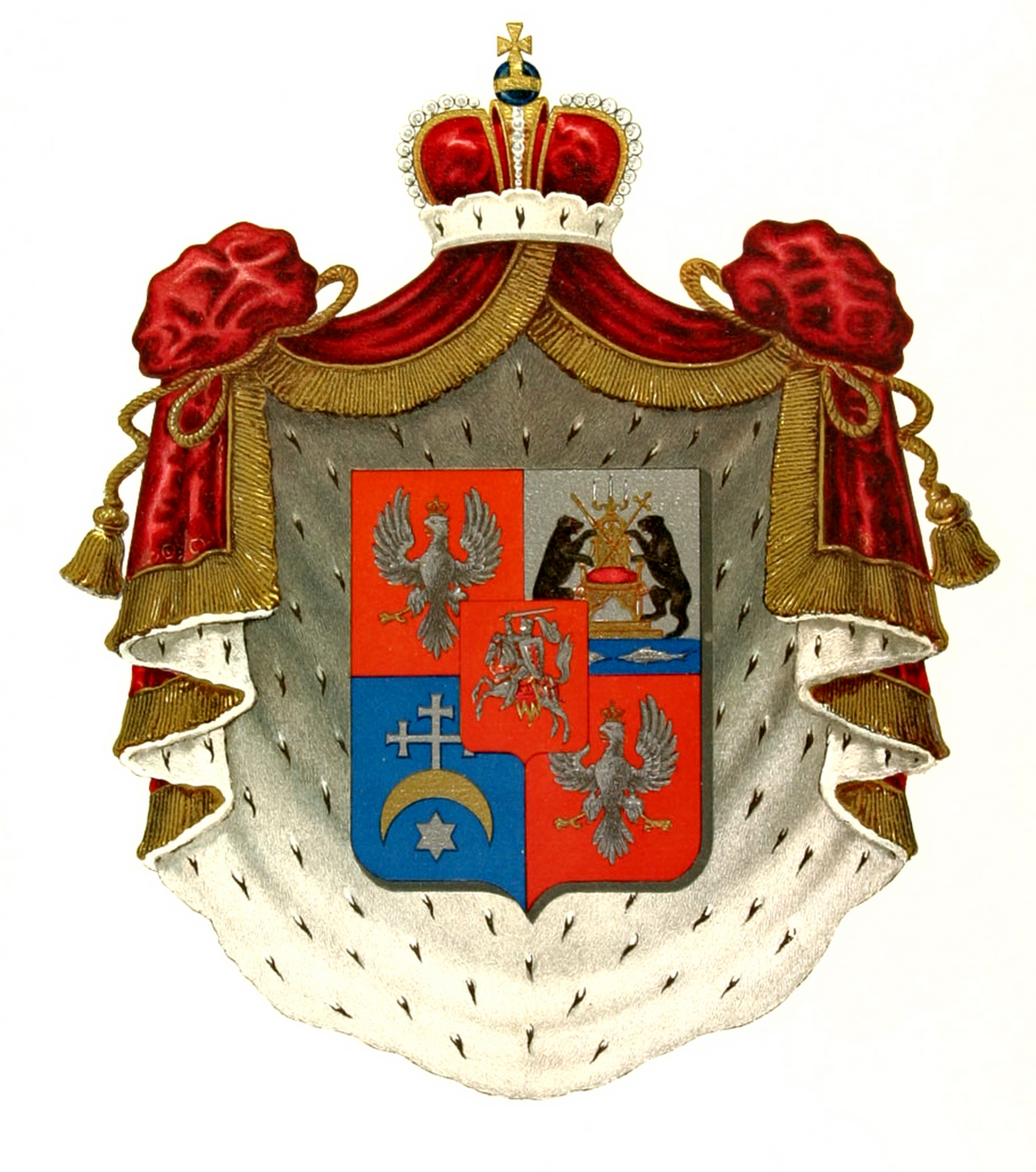
Coat of arms of the Kurakin family

The House of Kurakin (Russian: Куракин) is an old Russian princely family descended from Lithuanian dynasty of Gediminas. They are closely related to the House of Golitsyn.

== History ==
The surname comes from Turkic quraq, 'empty, greedy'.

The Russian princely dynasty Kurakin, an originally Lithuanian dynasty, descended from the Lithuanian Grand Duke Gediminas, who ruled the then independent Grand Duchy of Lithuania from 1315 to 1341 as the sovereign Lithuanian ruler. His son Narimunt, who died in 1347, was Prince of Pinsk, his son Patrikey was Prince of Zvenigorod (a principality on the Dniester), and later Prince of Greater Novgorod. Prince Andrei Ivanovich Bulgakov (documented in 1530) is descended from his son Georg, who took the nickname Kuraka, from which the name Kurakin was derived. One of the greatest Gedyminid families of Muscovy, whose members were promoted straight to the rank of okolnichy, skipping lower ranks like the stolnik.

== Notable members ==
- Prince Alexander Kurakin (1752–1818), Russian statesman and diplomat
- Alexander Kurakin (1697) (1697–1749) statesman and diplomat
- Prince Alexey Kurakin (1759–1829), Russian statesman
- Prince Boris Kurakin (1676–1727), Russian statesman and diplomat
- Boris Alekseevich Kurakin (1784–1850), Russian politician and diplomat
- Princess Natalia Ivanovna Kurakina (1766-1831), Russian composer, singer and noblewoman

== See also ==
- Kurakin, list of persons with the surname
