= Boris Kurakin (disambiguation) =

- Boris Kurakin (1676–1727), Russian statesman and diplomat
- Boris Kurakin (1733), Russian statesman, hofmeister, senator
- Boris Alekseevich Kurakin (1784–1850), Russian politician and diplomat
