= Elena Kurakina =

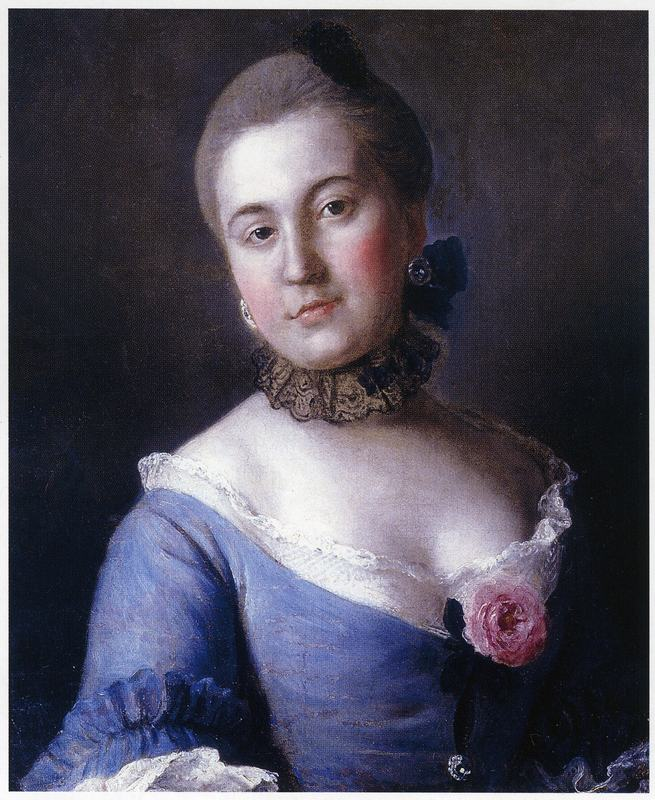
- Artist Pietro Rotari, 1750s
- Born: Elena Stepanovna Apraksina; September 5, 1735
- Died: October 29, 1768 (aged 33)
- Spouse: Boris Kurakin (1733–1764)
- Children: 7 sons and 2 daughters
- Parents: Stepan Apraksin (father); Agrippina Soimonova (mother)

Princess Elena Stepanovna Kurakina, Russian: Еле́на Степа́новна Кура́кина, née Apraksina, Russian: Апра́ксина) (September 5, 1735 – October 29, 1768) was the daughter of Field Marshal Stepan Apraksin, the wife of Senator Boris–Leonty Kurakin, one of the favorites of Emperor Peter III.

== Biography ==
She came from an untitled branch of the Apraksins. The eldest daughter of Field Marshal Stepan Apraksin (1702–1760) from his marriage to Agrafena Soimonova (1719–1771). From childhood she was accustomed to court life; Grand Duchess Ekaterina Alekseevna recalled:

One day the Empress went to have dinner with General Stepan Apraksin; we were among those invited... The next day I learned that the third daughter of General Stepan Apraksin, with whom we had dined the day before, died that day from smallpox; I was scared: all the ladies invited with us to dinner at General Apraksin's were constantly scurrying back and forth from this sick child's room to the chambers where we were. But this time I escaped only with fear. I saw for the first time that day the two daughters of General Apraksin, the eldest of whom was becoming very beautiful – she could have been about 13 years old then; this is the same one who later married Prince Kurakin...

On February 6, 1751, 15–year–old Elena Stepanovna married the chamberlain, senator Prince Boris–Leonty Kurakin. Due to her husband's official duties and her own inclination towards social life, Elena Stepanovna lived in Saint Petersburg in the winter, and preferred to spend the summer at the Saint Petersburg dacha on the Neva or at the Eldigino Estate near Moscow.

In her "Notes", Catherine II noted (when describing the events of 1756) the open connection of Elena Kurakina with the General Feldzeugmeister Count Pyotr Shuvalov. According to Catherine, on Kurakina's part, the main role in this relationship was played by calculation, not love: Elena used Shuvalov to support her father's reputation at court, especially during the investigation of him. Also, these relationships helped the Grand Duchess Ekaterina Alekseevna herself during clashes with enemies, as a result of which, upon accession to the throne, Ekaterina always treated Kurakina favorably.

At the same time, Elena Stepanovna was conducting a love affair with Shuvalov's adjutant, then little–known Grigory Orlov. The romantic story about how Count Shuvalov discovered this connection, accidentally taking the lovers by surprise, created a lot of noise in Saint Petersburg and, as it is believed, first drew the attention of Catherine II to Grigory Orlov.

Soon after the accession of Peter III to the throne, Elena Stepanovna attracted the attention of the monarch. Prince Mikhail Shcherbatov in his pamphlet "On the Damage to Morals in Russia" described Kurakina's behavior as follows:

Her shamelessness was such that when he (Lev Naryshkin) was taking her home early in the morning, he wished, in order to preserve her honour and moreover, so that Countess Elizaveta Vorontsova should not be made aware of this, to close the curtains and go, but on the contrary, she opened the curtains and wanted to show everyone that she had been at the Emperor's house.

Also, according to Shcherbatov with reference to the words of Dmitry Volkov, Peter III's secretary, Kurakina was unwittingly responsible for the appearance of the manifesto "On the Freedom of the Nobility", hastily composed by Volkov during their meeting to hide it from the "official" favourite Elizaveta Vorontsova, who was announced that the sovereign is busy with Volkov "reasoning the improvement of the state".

In the Satirical Catalog at the Court of Catherine II, a book entitled "Mille et Une Faveurs" was attributed to Princess Kurakina.

Her husband, Boris–Leonty Kurakin, died in 1764 at the age of 30, leaving his wife and children with many debts. Their guardians were appointed: Counts Peter and Nikita Panin, Count Fyodor Apraksin and Alexander Talyzin. The guardians, especially Count Pyotr Panin, were able to bring the Kurakins' huge, but extremely debt–ridden fortune into exemplary order.

Elena Stepanovna survived her husband by only 4 years and died in 1768 at the age of 33. She was buried in the Lazarev Cemetery of the Alexander Nevsky Lavra, leaving behind "dear children, four sons", as was written on the marble tomb by Ivan Martos, erected to her by her sons. The sculpture depicted a bowed woman sobbing at the grave of a deceased princess. At the foot, the sons of the deceased are hugging and crying.

== Family ==
In her marriage to Boris–Leonty Kurakin, Elena Stepanovna had seven sons and two daughters, five of whom died in infancy.

- Alexander Borisovich (1752–1818), Vice–Chancellor of the Russian Empire, Ambassador to Vienna and Paris (1808–1812);
- Agrafena Borisovna (died in childhood);
- Alexandra Borisovna (died in childhood);
- Stepan Borisovich (1754–1805), Major General, Active Privy Councilor;
- Ivan Borisovich (June 13, 1755 – May 27, 1756);
- Nikolay Borisovich (1756 – August 2, 1758);
- Alexey Borisovich (1759–1829), Prosecutor General, Minister of Internal Affairs, Active Privy Councillor of the 1st Class;
- Ivan Borisovich (1761–1827);
- Dmitry Borisovich (1763–1764).
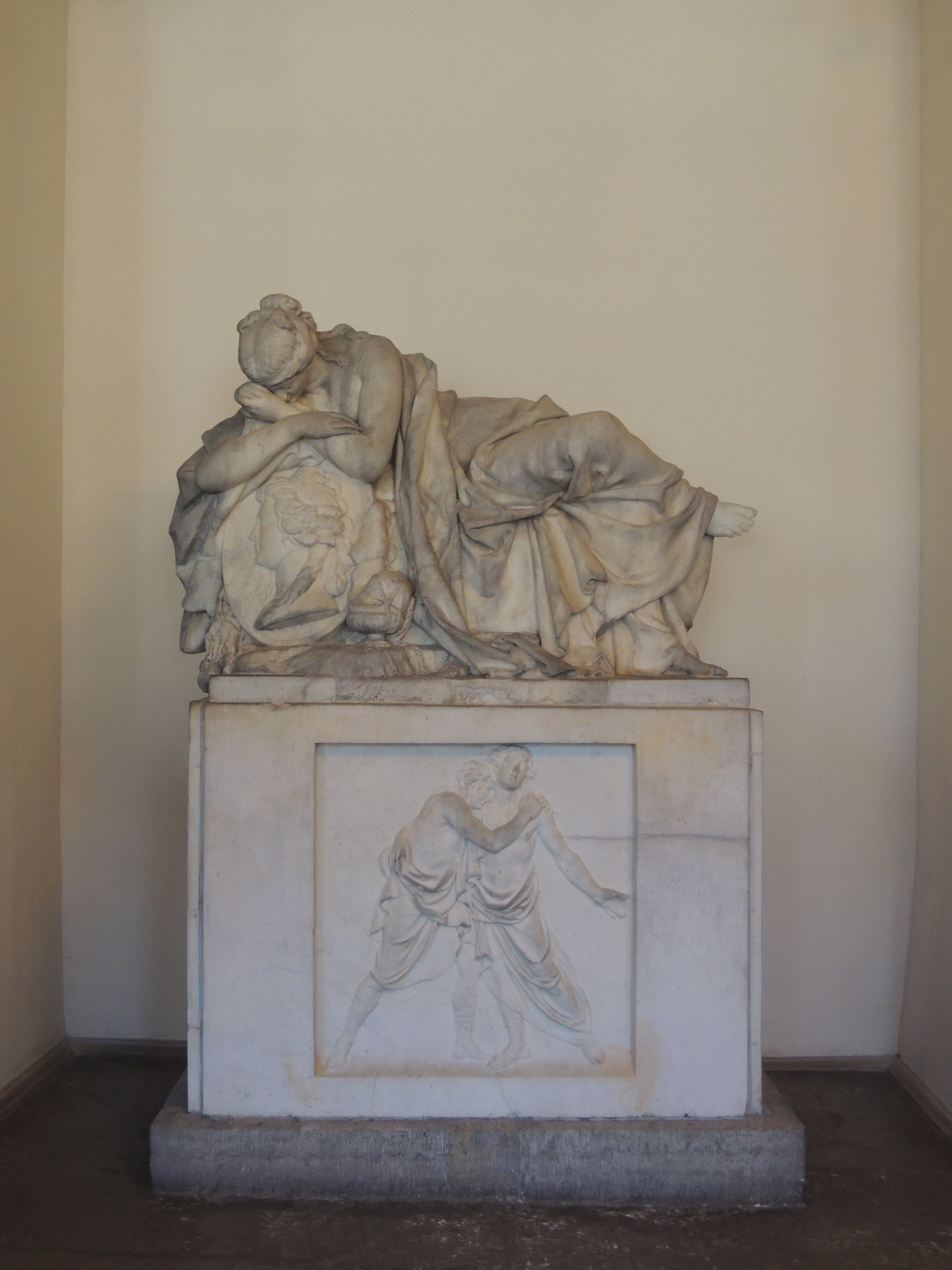
Tombstone of Princess Kurakina

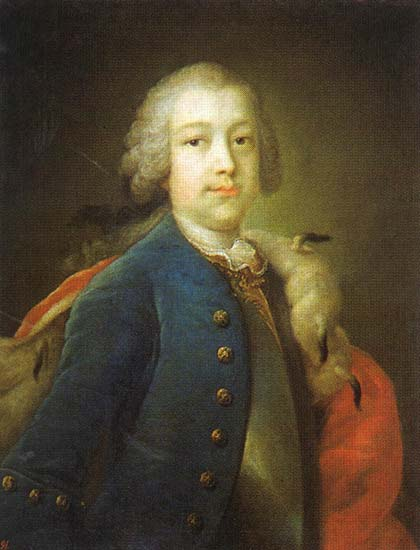
Boris–Leonty Kurakin

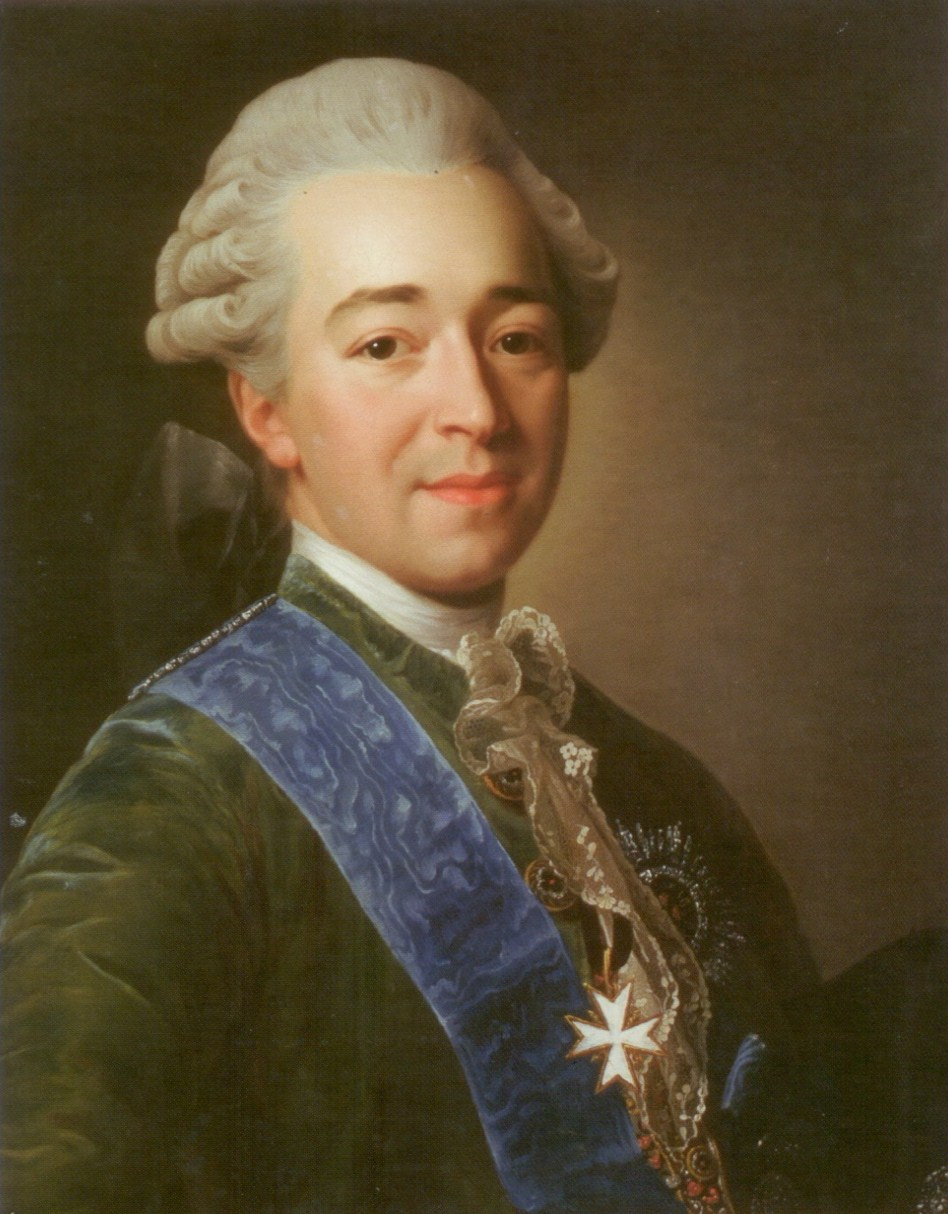
Alexander Kurakin

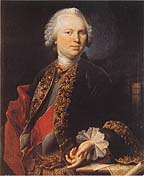
Stepan Kurakin

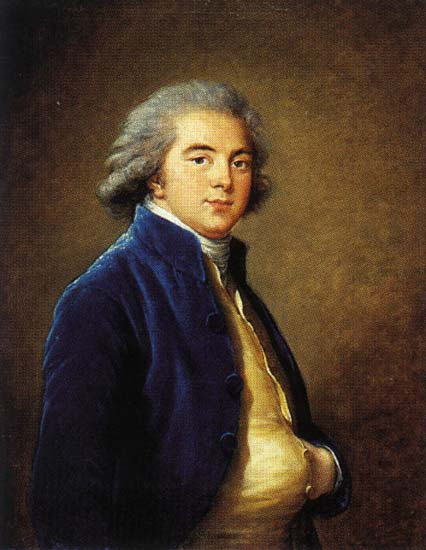
Alexey Kurakin

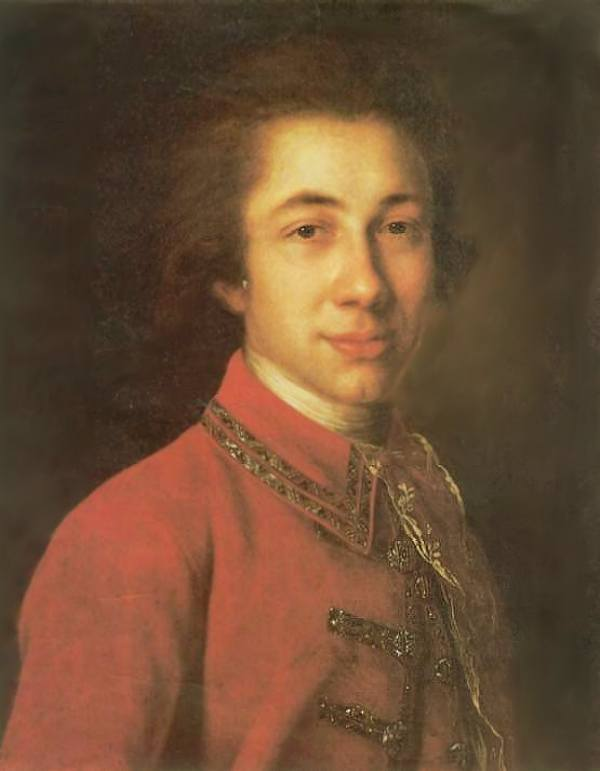
Ivan Kurakin

== Sources ==
- Russian Portraits of the 18th–19th Centuries. Edition of Grand Duke Nikolai Mikhailovich. Saint Petersburg. 1906. Volume II, Issue III. No. 55
