= Alexandra Kurakina =

Russian noblewoman (1711–1786)

- Александра Куракина
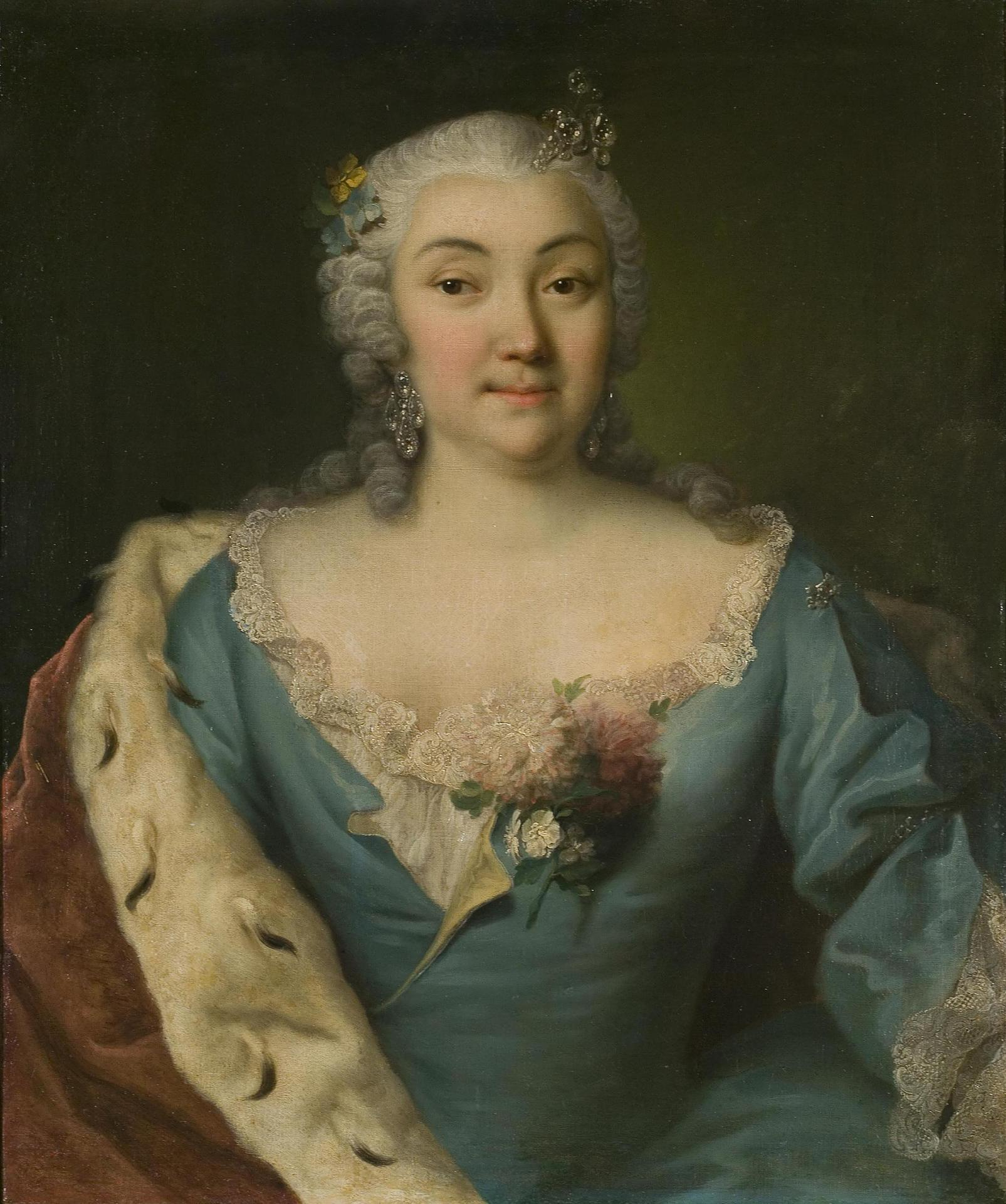
- Painting by Georg Christoph Grooth, 1747
- Born: Countess Panina; 14 February 1711
- Died: 22 February 1786 (aged 75)
- Spouse: Alexander Borisovich Kurakin (m. 1730; died 1749)
- Children: 9
- Parents: Ivan Vasilyevich Panin (1673 – 1736) (father); Agrafena Vasilievna Everlakova (1688 – 1753) (mother)

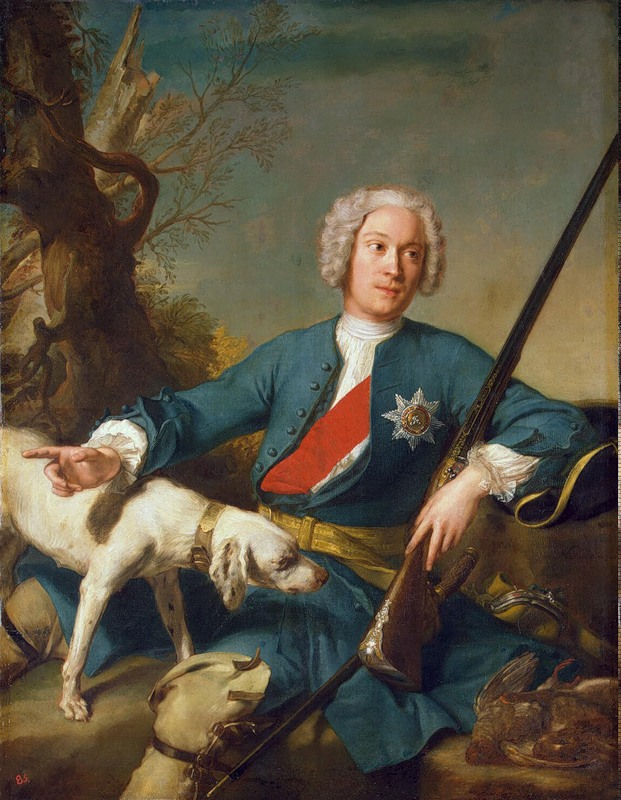
Alexander Borisovich Kurakin. Painting by Jean-Marc Nattier, 1728

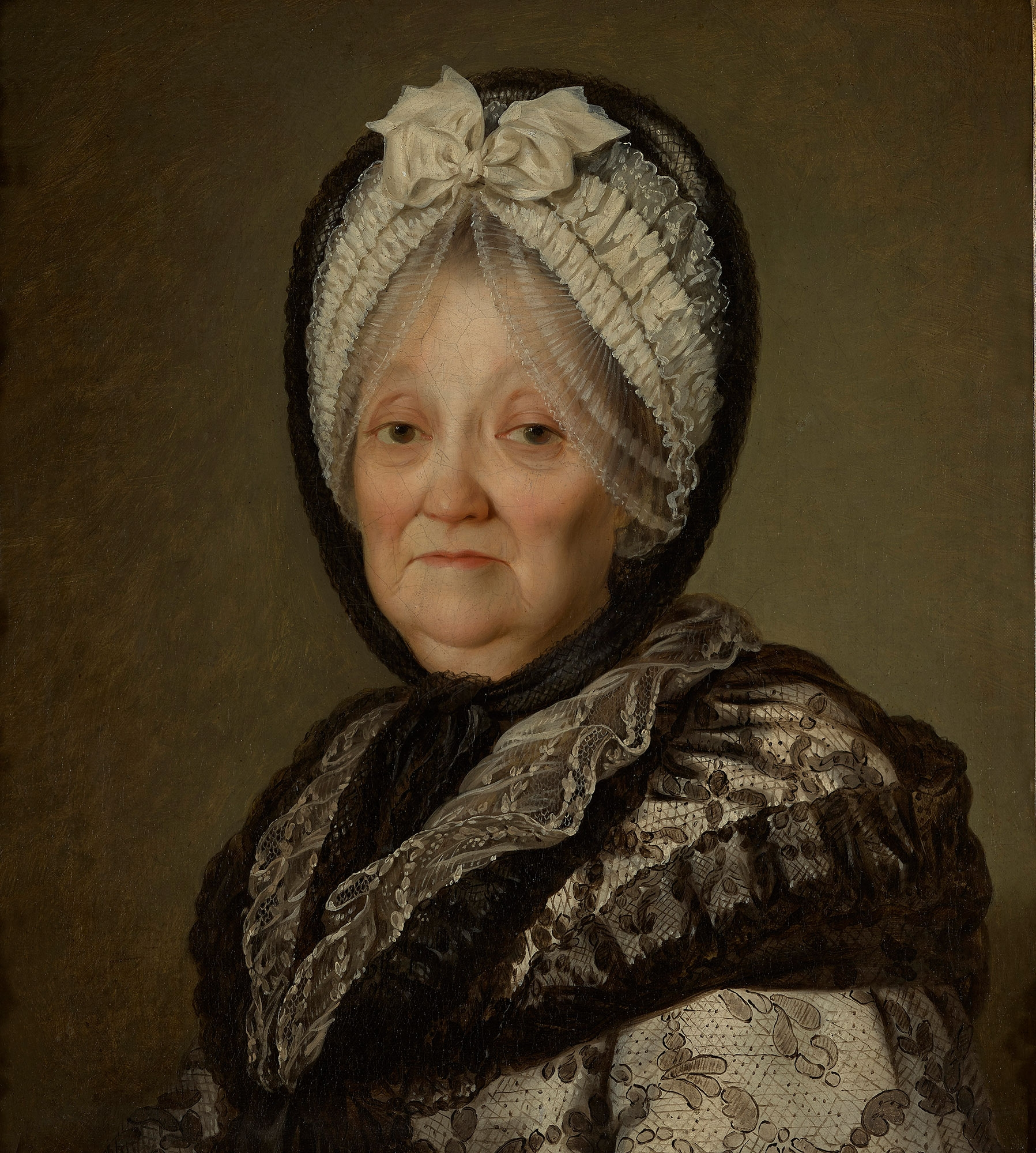
Princess Alexandra Ivanovna Kurakina, 72 years old

Princess Alexandra Ivanovna Kurakina, (Russian: Алекса́ндра Ива́новна Кура́кина, née Panina, Russian: Па́нина; February 14, 1711 – February 22, 1786) was the daughter of Lieutenant-General and Senator Ivan Panin, the sister of the famous counts Nikita and Peter Panin, the grandmother of Princes Alexander and Alexey Kurakin and poet Yury Neledinsky-Meletsky.

== Biography ==
=== Origin ===
Alexandra Ivanovna (according to some sources Agrafena) was the eldest child in the family. By father, Ivan Vasilyevich, belonged to the noble family of Panin. On the mother's side, Agrafena Vasilievna Everlakova, was related to the Naryshkins and Leontievs.

Her grandfather, clerk Vasily Alekseevich Everlakov, was very close to Tsarevich Alexei Petrovich. In a number of sources of compilation nature, it is stated that Everlakov's wife was Tatyana Danilovna, the sister of the Most High Prince Alexander Menshikov; whereas in modern scientific works the relations of Menshikov with Everlakovs are not mentioned.

== Marriage ==
Alexandra Ivanovna received a good home education, spent her childhood and youth in Pernov, where her father was the commandant.

At 19, she was married to Prince Alexander Borisovich Kurakin (1697 – 1749), Privy Councilor and Conference Minister, who had just returned from Paris, where he was the Plenipotentiary Ambassador. Their wedding took place on April 26, 1730. Alexandra's marriage was the beginning of the rise of the Panin family.

The Kurakin family held a high position at court. Alexander Borisovich under Empress Anna Ioannovna was a supporter of Ernst Johann von Biron and became his official jester and amusement. With the help of intrigue, he managed to maintain his position in the reign of Elizabeth Petrovna. In 1749, Alexander Ivanovna widowed. She had eight children left in her arms.

== Life in Moscow ==
Having lost her husband, Alexandra Ivanovna permanently lived in Moscow in the huge house that she had inherited on Myasnitskaya street, where the entire city was going to on permanent holidays and feasts. In this house, Princess Kurakina was surrounded by a large family, children and grandchildren; she also brought up the sons of her only son who died in 1764, Prince Boris Alexandrovich Kurakin, later known Princes Alexander and Alexey Borisovich; to them, the grandmother, until the end of her life, retained affection, being in correspondence with them and keenly interested in their brilliant career.

The letters of Alexandra Ivanovna are among the best examples of the epistolary heritage of the 18th century. She wrote equally well in Russian and French.

After marrying her daughters and the disintegration of a large family, deserted the huge Kurakin house, in which she remained alone with her unmarried daughter, Princess Agrafena Alexandrovna, continued to serve, thanks to her, as a connecting center for the whole family, among which she enjoyed great respect and prestige.

Alexandra Ivanovna did not like feeling her own age and did not let him feel it to others. She was very mobile and hospitable, at the age of 66 she went hunting, visiting her brother, Count Peter Panin, in his Dugino estate in Smolensk and led a secular lifestyle, while remaining very moderate in her tastes and habits. In old age she wrote about herself:

I am a model on this, and every day I go out from the table with hunger, and it keeps me going, and I advise everyone not to eat everything.

Old Kurakina, as she was known in Moscow, was deeply involved in charitable work. A pious and devout woman, Alexandra Ivanovna kept a private chapel in her home dedicated to the Holy Trinity, where she attended mass every morning. She maintained close ties with prominent members of the clergy, among whom she especially favored Samuel, the Archbishop of Rostov.

Princess Kurakina died 75 years old on February 11, 1786, and was buried in the Cathedral of the Moscow Novospassky Monastery, where the inscription carved on the headstone ends with the words:

...and although she did not retire from the secular life, but all the time she kept and sent with all strictness the monastic rules and fasting, and the Most High Creator blessed her to see her sons' sons.

== Children ==
In marriage, Princess Alexandra Ivanovna Kurakina had one son:

- Boris-Leonty Aleksandrovich (1733–1764), senator, president of the Board of Economy and Board of Chamber. He was married to the famous beauty Elena Stepanovna Apraksina (1735 – 1769).

and eight daughters:

- Anna Alexandrovna (1731–1749);
- Tatyana Alexandrovna (1732–1754), was the first wife of Alexander Neledinsky-Meletsky (1729–1804);
- Agrafena Alexandrovna (1734–1791), from December 9, 1749, was a maid of honor of Empress Elizabeth Petrovna, and during the reign of Catherine the Great was considered "on leave". She lived mainly in Moscow with her mother, she was not married;
- Catherine Alexandrovna (1735–1802), married to Prince Ivan Lobanov-Rostovsky;
- Alexandra Alexandrovna (1736–1739);
- Natalya Alexandrovna (1737–1798), State Lady, the wife of Field Marshal Prince Nikolai Repnin;
- Anastasia Alexandrovna (died 1939, in the third month);
- Praskovya Alexandrovna (13 June 1741 – 5 November 1755), died of fever.
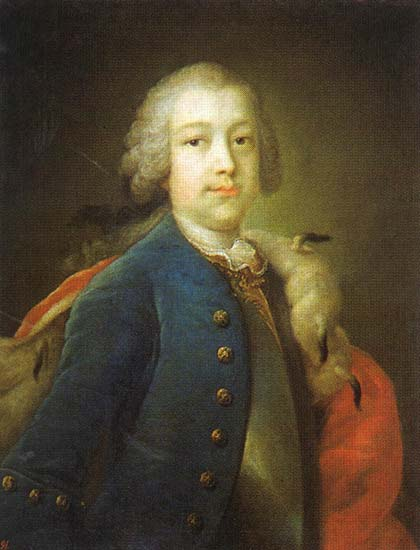
Boris

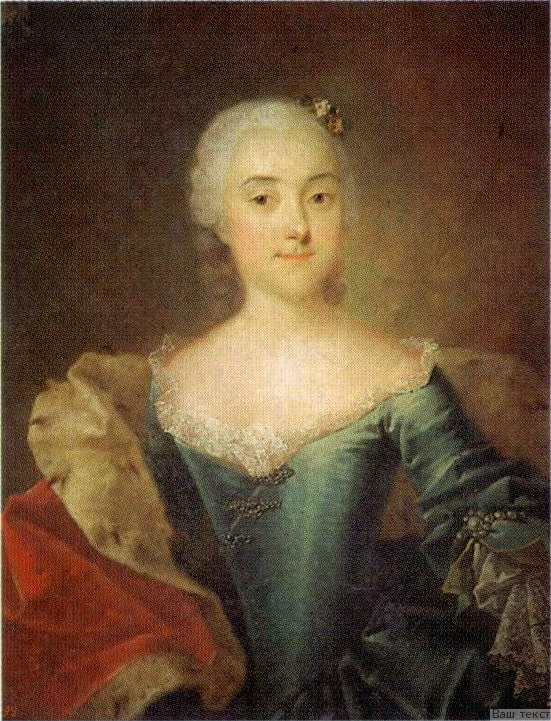
Anna

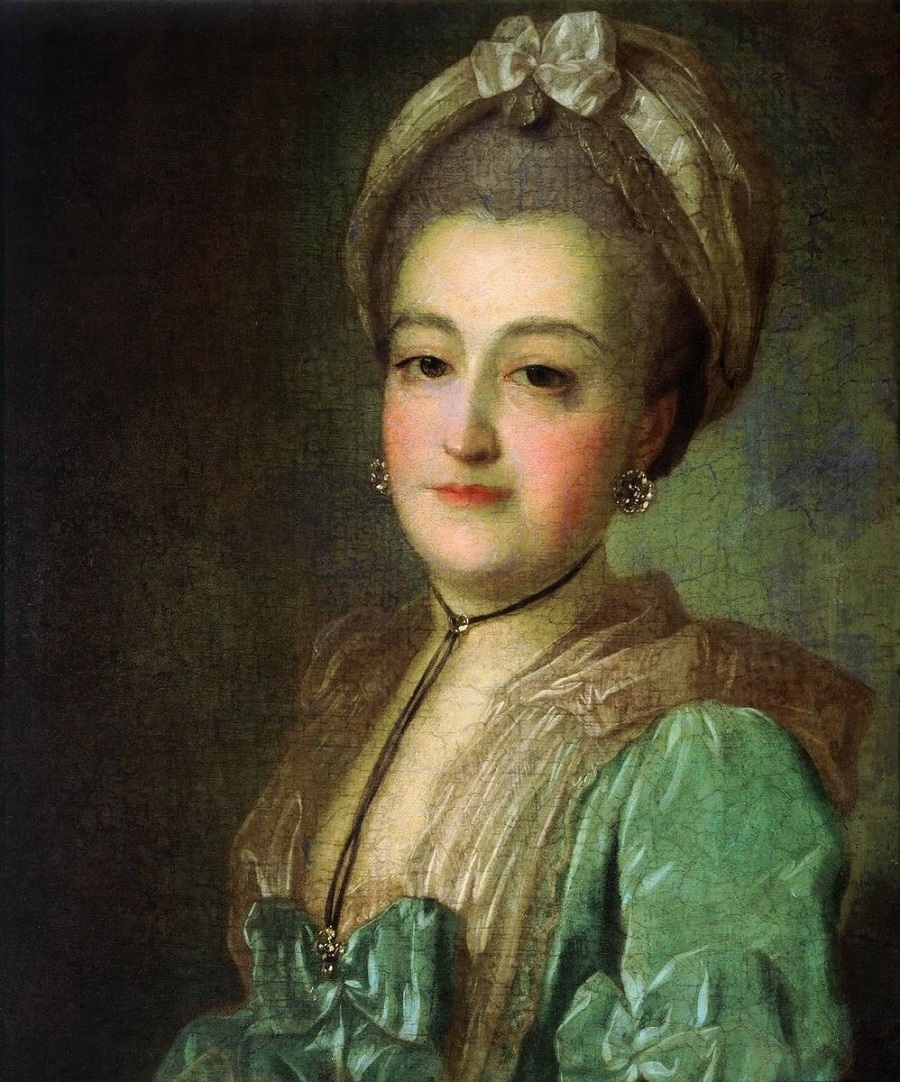
Agrafena

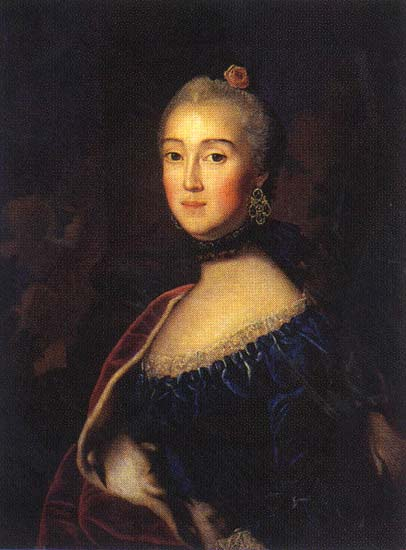
Catherine

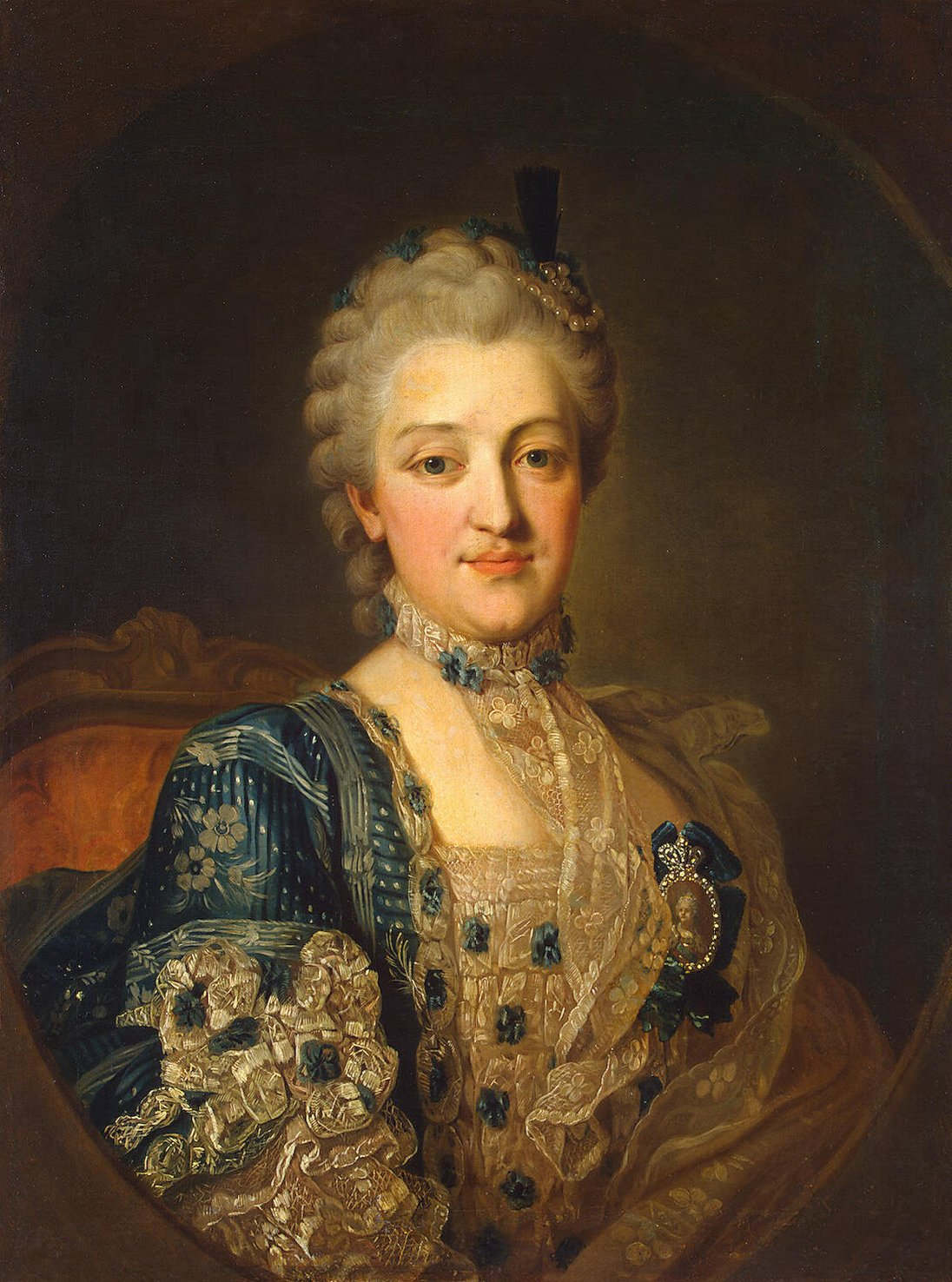
Natalia
