= Boris Kurakin (1733) =

Russian statesman, clerk and senator (1733–1764)

Boris Alexandrovich Kurakin
- Борис Александрович Куракин
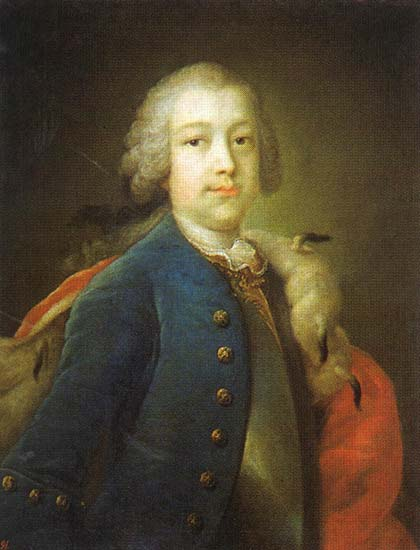

President of the Chamber Collegium
- In office 1762–1764
- Preceded by: Ivan Yushkov
- Succeeded by: Alexey Melgunov

Personal details
- Born: 22 June 1733
- Died: 4 December 1764 (aged 31)
- Resting place: Chudov Monastery
- Spouse: Elena Kurakina
- Children: Alexander Kurakin, Stepan Kurakin, Alexey Kurakin and Ivan Kurakin
- Parents: Alexander Kurakin (father); Alexandra Kurakina (mother)
- Relatives: Kurakins
- Awards: Order of Saint Alexander Nevsky

Prince Boris–Leonty Alexandrovich Kurakin (Russian: Борис Александрович Куракин; 22 July 1733 – 4 December 1764) was a Russian statesman, hofmeister (office), senator.

== Background ==
The son of the Chief Stahlmeister, Prince Alexander Borisovich Kurakin and Alexandra Ivanovna, née Panina. Nothing is known of his childhood and youth; in 1761 – lieutenant general; in 1762, he was the hofmeister.

== Career ==
Having established a commission on 29 November 1762 to resolve the issue of monastic estates, Catherine II appointed to this commission secular persons: Senator Count Ivan Vorontsov, Prince Sergey Gagarin, Chief Prosecutor of the Holy Synod Prince Kozlovsky, Teplov and Prince Boris Kurakin. Upon the establishment of the Collegium of Economy on 12 May 1763, Prince Kurakin was appointed its president. This was a very important appointment: the Collegium of Savings was to collect over one and a half million revenues, that is, almost a tenth of the then total budget of Russia.

By a decree of 30 March 1764, the Chamber Collegium was also entrusted with his management; Kurakin was also made a senator. We learn from the empress's papers that she was dissatisfied with the "silent situation" of such an important collegium as the Chamber Collegium and her appointment as president Kurakin hoped to revive it. The absence of a higher government agency that would manage the state's finances as a whole was a very significant gap in the Russian government throughout the eighteenth century, and the attempt to create such an agency, initiated by the union of the Chamber Collegium and the Collegium of Savings, is extremely remarkable. And Prince Boris Kurakin belonged in this regard, no doubt, the main role. The State Archive contains two remarkable reports submitted by him to the Empress on issues of state economy; after them, he was appointed president of the Chamber Collegium and one of his reports served as the basis for a personal decree dated 30 March 1764, which outlines the unsatisfactory position of the Chamber Collegium at this time and the range of tasks and responsibilities that its activities should determine in order for this activity to receive true state significance.

The Chamber Collegium at that time acted according to the regulations of 1731, which significantly narrowed its tasks in comparison with how Peter the Great outlined them. Prince Kurakin proposed to return in general to what Peter had set as the task of the collegium. He argued that the Chamber Collegium should not only be aware of revenues, but should manage, open and create new sources of income, improving, mainly, the situation of those classes that mainly generate income.

Empress Catherine highly appreciated the activities of Kurakin. Having received news in Saint Petersburg about his serious illness, she sent him the following rescript on 21 November 1764, in which she attributed the last two phrases with her own hand:

Prince Boris Alexandrovich! I am immensely sorry that you are ill and wish to hear about your relief. I recommend that you leave all your labors put on you because you, as I hear, do not leave them in illness. Do not bother yourself with anything for which you will not be completely ripe. I hear that you are not taking medicine, perhaps at least take care of me; I need your health.

The successor to Prince Boris Kurakin for the presidency of the Chamber Collegium, Aleksey Melgunov, completely adopted the ideas of Kurakin, and the order from the collegium for the deputy to the Commission to compose a draft new code was a repetition of the reports of Prince Kurakin.

The printed letters of Prince Boris Kurakin to his son, Prince Alexander Kurakin for 1763 and 1764, depict Prince Boris Kurakin to us as a very cordial, serious, and strictly devoted man.

== Personal life ==
In a marriage with Elena Stepanovna Apraksina, Boris Alexandrovich had seven sons and two daughters, of whom five died in infancy.

- Alexander Borisovich (1752–1818), Vice–Chancellor of the Russian Empire, Ambassador to Vienna and Paris (1808–1812);
- Agrafena Borisovna (died in childhood);
- Alexandra Borisovna (died in childhood);
- Stepan Borisovich (1754–1805) – Major General, Actual Privy Councilor;
- Ivan Borisovich (June 13, 1755 – 27 May 1756);
- Nikolai Borisovich (1756 – 2 August 1758);
- Alexey Borisovich (1759–1829) – Prosecutor General, Minister of Internal Affairs, Real Secret Adviser of the 1st Class;
- Ivan Borisovich (1761–1827);
- Dmitry Borisovich (1763–1764).
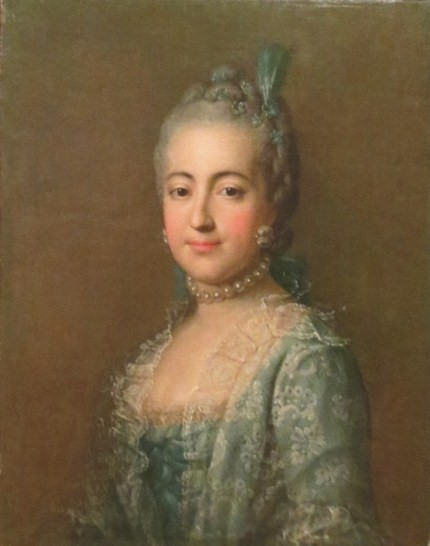
Elena Stepanovna

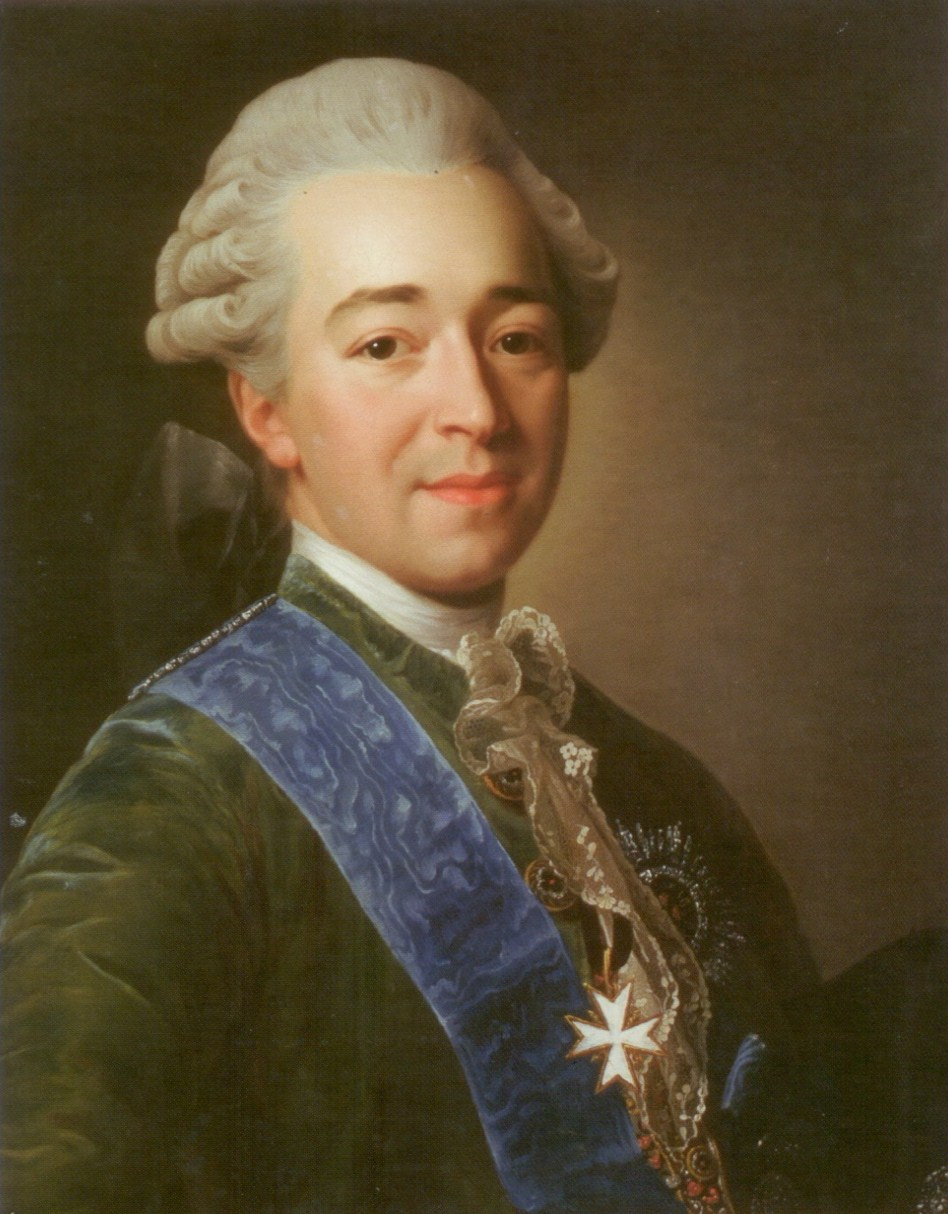
Alexander Kurakin

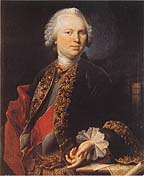
Stepan Kurakin

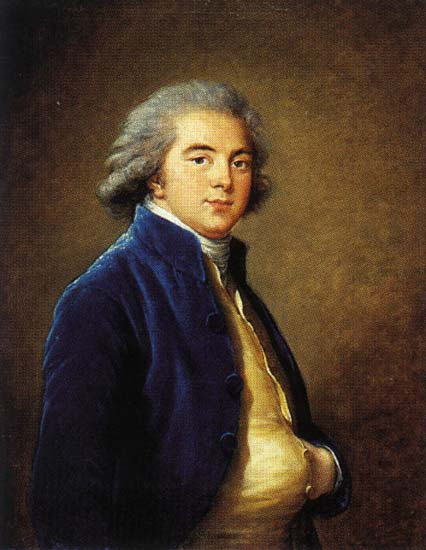
Alexey Kurakin

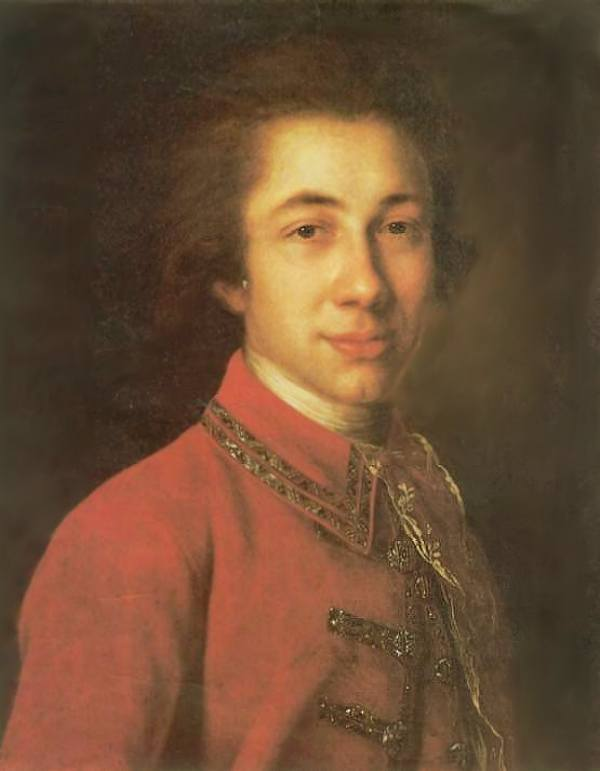
Ivan Kurakin

== Death and burial ==
He died on 4 December 1764.

He is buried in the Chudov Monastery; after its destruction, the tombstone was transported to the necropolis of the Donskoy Monastery.

== Sources ==
- Kurakin, Boris–Leonty Alexandrovich // Russian Biographical Dictionary: in 25 Volumes – Saint Petersburg – Moscow, 1896–1918
