= Portrait of Bishop Antonius Triest and His Brother Eugene, a Capuchin =

Painting by David Teniers the Younger

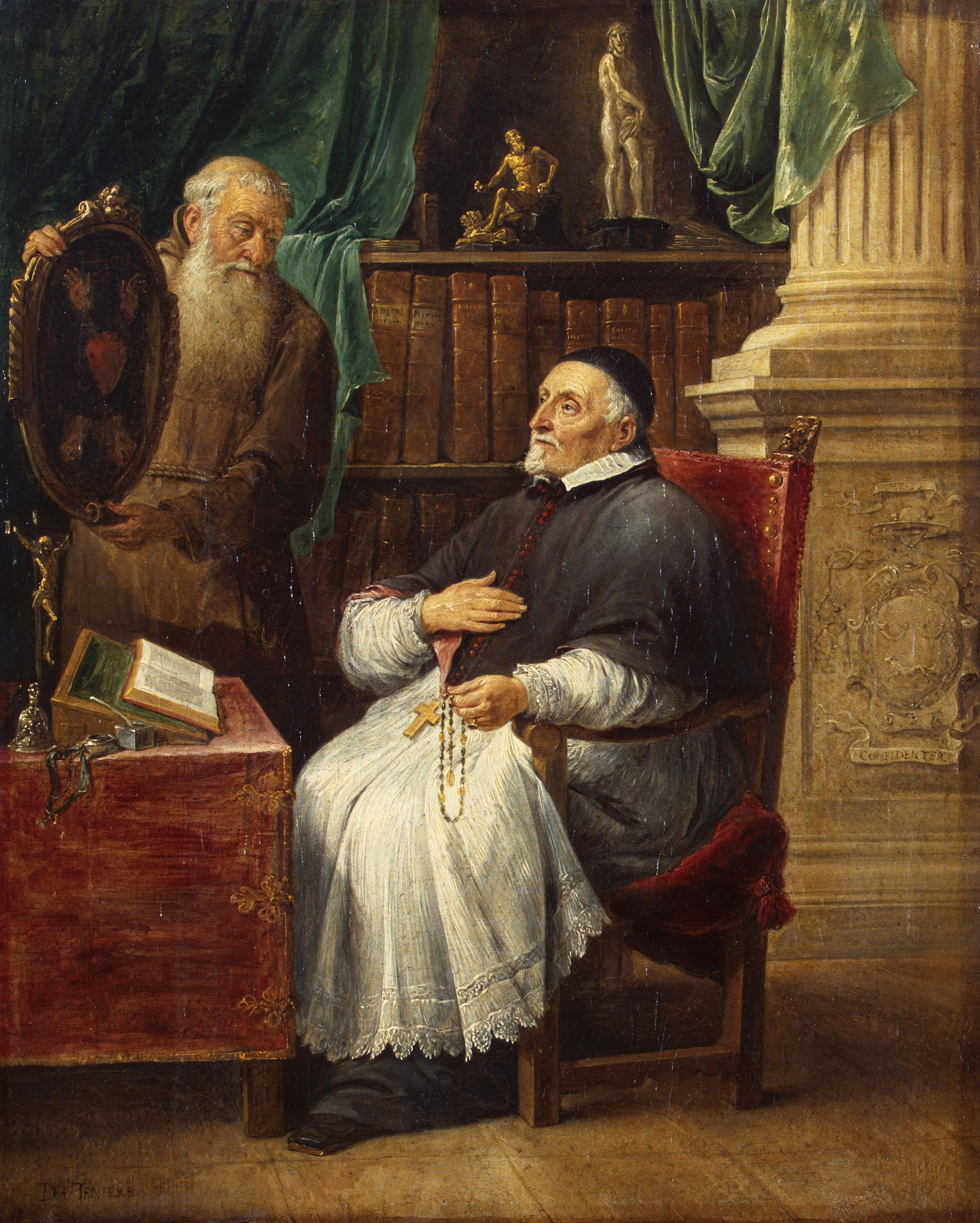
Portrait of Bishop Antonius Triest and His Brother Eugene, a Capuchin (1652) by David Teniers the Younger

Portrait of Bishop Antonius Triest and His Brother Eugene, a Capuchin is an oil-on-canvas painting created in 1652 by David Teniers the Younger, now in the Hermitage Museum in Saint Petersburg, to which it was transferred from Boris Alekseevich Kurakin's collection.

To the right is Antoine Triest, who had been made Bishop of Bruges in 1617 and Bishop of Ghent in 1622. He was also a noted art collector and arts patron and bought works from Teniers and other Flemish painters. He is shown in prayer holding a rosary. To the left his brother, a Capuchin Friar, holds up a shield showing the five wounds of Christ, whilst the shelf in the background bears statuettes of Penitent St Jerome and Flagellation of Christ.
