= Osip Kozodavlev =

Russian politician

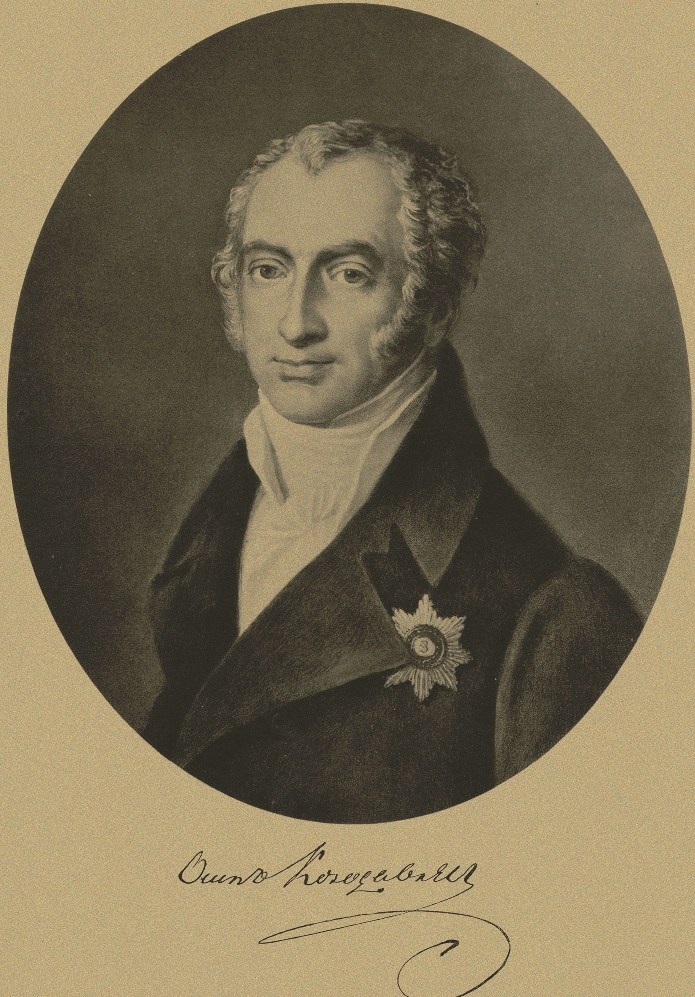
O. Kozodavlev

Osip Petrovich Kozodavlev (Russian: Осип Петрович Козодавлев) (9 April [O.S. 29 March] 1754 – 5 August [O.S. 24 July] 1819) was a Russian statesman, politician and Minister of the Interior from March 31, 1810, to July 24, 1819.

He was married to Anna Petrovna Golitsyna.

Preceded by Aleksey Kurakin	Minister of Interior; March 1810 – July 1819	Succeeded by Alexander Golitsyn
