= Alexey Kurakin =

Russian statesman

Prince Alexei Borisovich Kurakin
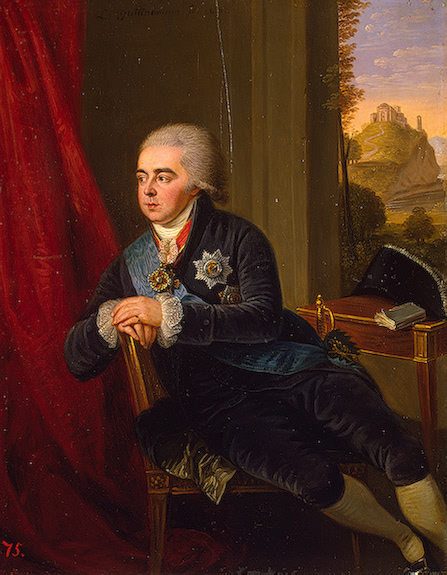
- Portrait of Prince Alexei Kurakin. Painting by Ludwig Guttenbrunn. Hermitage Museum.
- Born: Алексей Борисович Куракин; 19 September 1759
- Died: 30 December 1829 (aged 70); Kurakino, Maloarkhangelsky District, Oryol Governorate
- Noble family: Kurakins
- Spouse: Natalia Ivanovna Golovina
- Issue: Boris Alekseevich; Elena Alekseevna; Alexandra Alekseevna
- Father: Boris–Leonty Alexandrovich
- Mother: Elena Stepanovna Apraksina

Prince Alexei Borisovich Kurakin (Russian: Алексе́й Бори́сович Кура́кин; 19 September 1759 – 30 December 1829) was a Russian statesman, Active Privy Councillor of the 1st class (1826), who held several top positions in the reign of Paul I and Alexander I. The direct ancestor of all subsequent Kurakin princes.

== Biography ==
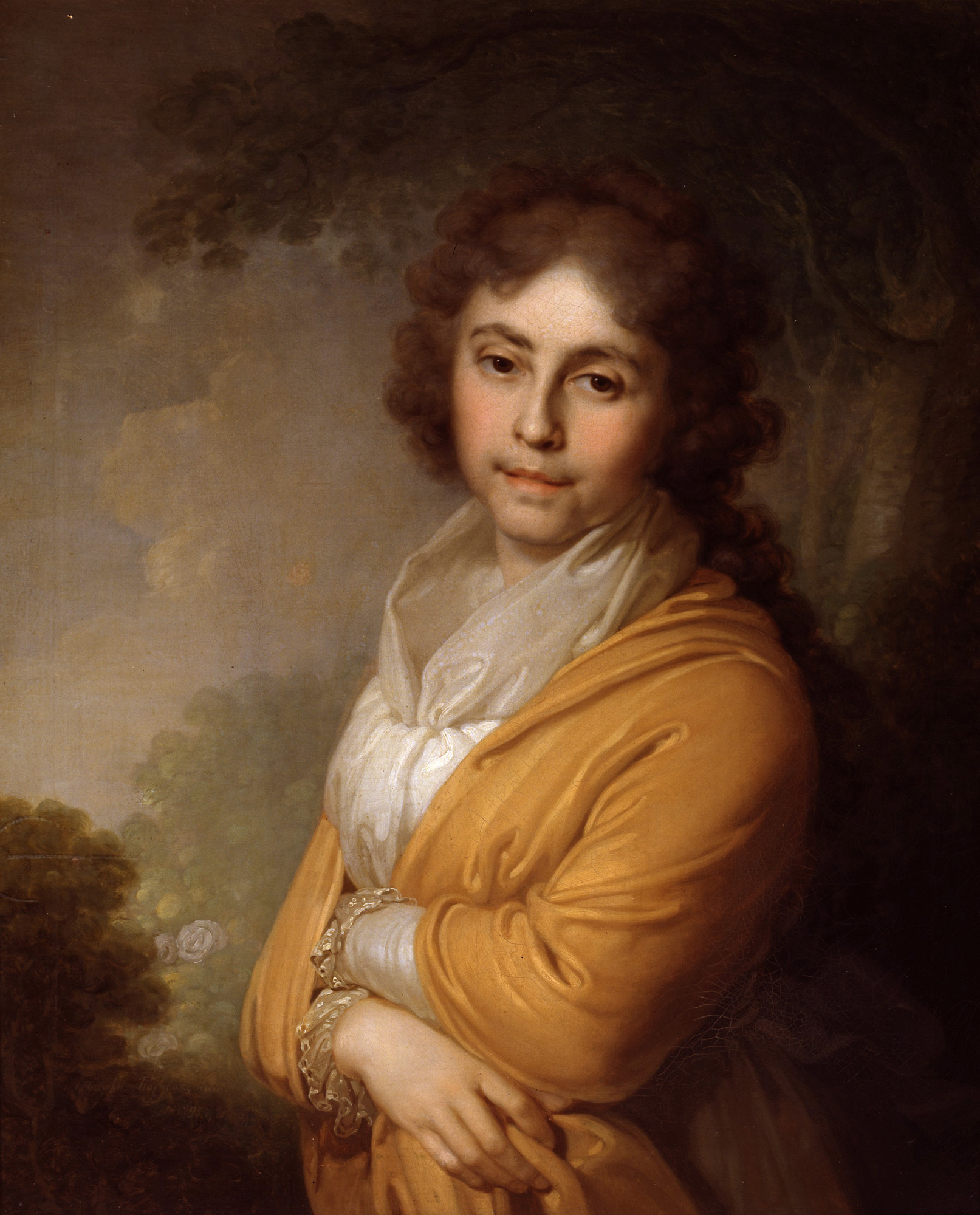
Natalia Ivanovna, wife

The younger brother of Alexander Borisovich Kurakin, who was brought up together with the crown prince Pavel Petrovich (future emperor Paul I) and this relationship was bound to take off his career in senior government positions, which began in the early days of Paul. From 1775 to 1776 he studied at Leiden University. In 1777 he received the title of chamber junker.

In 1793 he was granted a chamberlain, in 1795 promoted to a secret adviser; on 4 December 1796 he was appointed Prosecutor General; a few days later, on 19 December, he received the Order of Saint Alexander Nevsky and took the post of Chief Director of the Russian Assignation Bank. Being a procurator-general, he collected a "laid commission" – three books of laws on criminal, civil and state affairs, and re-established a school of junkers from the nobility under the Senate to train them in jurisprudence. On 5 April 1797 he was granted the rank of Active Privy Councillor, and on 19 December that year he was awarded the Order of Saint Andrew the First Called. Nevertheless, he fell into disgrace with the Emperor: on 8 August 1798 he was dismissed from the post of procurator-general; appointed as a senator, which meant an unconditional downgrade, and soon completely removed from public affairs. His brother Alexander also fell into disgrace.

He was again called up for public service by Alexander I; on 4 February 1802 he was appointed Little Russian Governor-General. He was in office for about six years; during this time he spent a canal on the river Ostyor, took care of public education and public health. Mikhail Speransky began his career with Alexei Borisovich; first as Kurakin's personal secretary, later adopted by the patron in the Senate office.

Since 1804, Alexey Kurakin has been a member of the Permanent Council; often served as chairman. After the Peace of Tilsit, he received from Napoleon a large cross of the Order of the Legion of Honour.

From 1807 to 1810, the Minister of the Interior. Being in this position, he arranged for the Main Board of Manufacturers and founded the Northern Mail (the New Saint Petersburg Newspaper). In 1808 he was awarded the highest award of Denmark – the Order of the Elephant.

Kurakin played a role during the Ottoman plague epidemic which hit Odessa in the autumn of 1812. Dismissive of any attempt to forge a compromise between quarantine requirements and free trade, Prince Kurakin (the Saint Petersburg-based High Commissioner for Sanitation) countermanded Richelieu's orders.

After leaving the post, again in the State Council. Since 1821, Chairman of the Department of State Economy of the State Council. Since 1826, the Chancellor of Russian orders. Member of the Supreme Criminal Court of the Decembrists.

According to Baron Heyking, Prince Kurakin was "a very handsome man, brilliant eyes and thick, black, beautifully drawn eyebrows, would give his appearance a stern expression if it were not softened by his friendly manners and polite tone of speech".

== Family ==
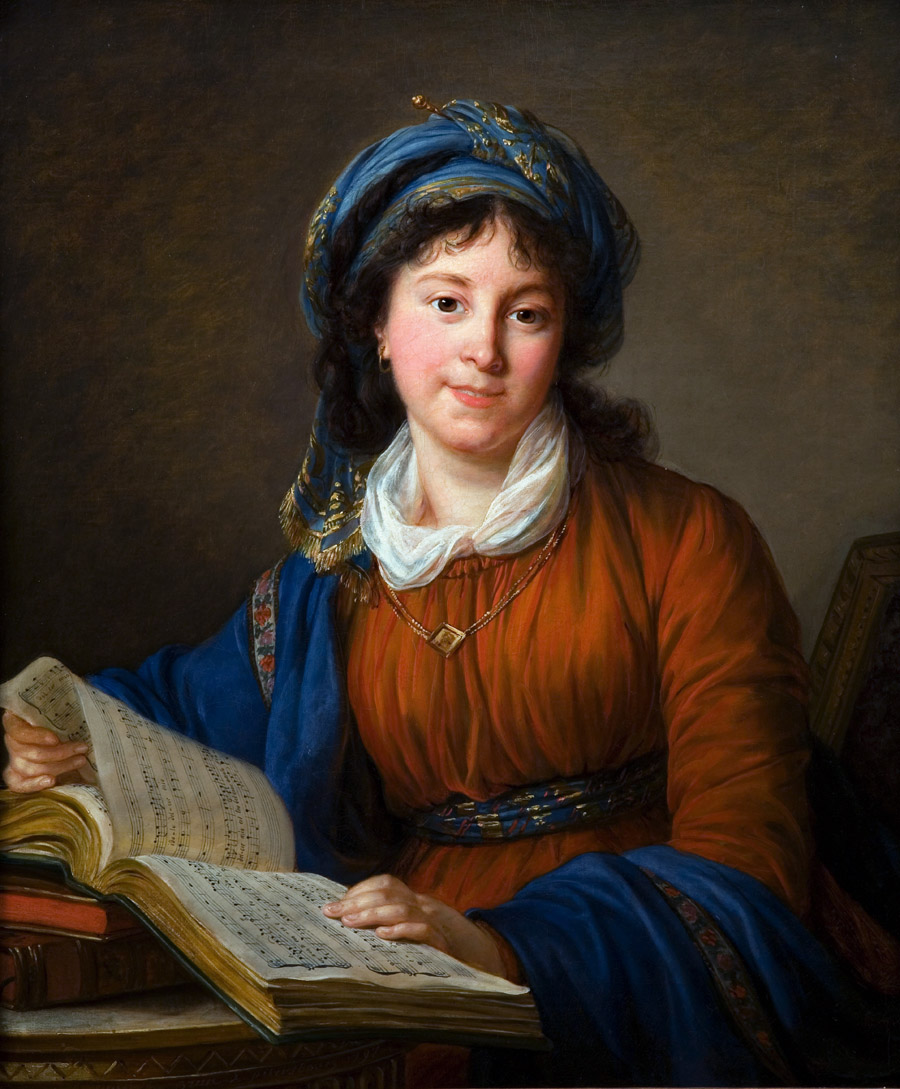
Portrait of Natalia Kurakina by Elisabeth Vigee-Lebrun, 1797.

Before his marriage, Kurakin was in love with Countess Ekaterina Ivanovna Chernysheva (1766-1830), but her father Count Ivan Chernyshyov considered a marriage to Prince Kurakin to be disadvantageous, especially since the latter was out of favour with Catherine II for his friendship with Grand Prince Pavel Petrovich. Chernysheva later married a handsome colonel Fyodor Fedorovich Vadkovsky (1756-1806).

On 15 February 1783, Prince Kurakin married Natalya Ivanovna Golovina (1766-1831), a talented musician and composer, subsequently a stats-lady. There were three children in their marriage:

- Boris Alekseevich (1783-1850), the godson of Empress Catherine II, the chamberlain and the senator, from 1808, was married to Princess Elizabeth Borisovna Golitsyna (1790-1871), daughter of Lieutenant General Boris Golitsyn.
- Elena Alekseevna (1787-1869), as well as a mother, a musician, and a singer, was first the bride of Prince Dmitry Mikhailovich Volkonsky (1770-1835), later a senator, but the marriage did not take place, and she married Count Nikolai Ivanovich Zotov (1782-1849). Their youngest daughter, Elizabeth (1808-1872), maid of honor and state lady, was married to Prince Alexander Chernyshyov.
- Alexandra Alekseevna (1788-1819) 1807 was married to Nikolai Sergeevich Saltykov (1786-1849), but two years later she left him for the sake of Colonel Peter Alexandrovich Chicherin (1778-1848). He took her away from her husband and, without receiving a divorce, married her. This story made a lot of noise in the public. Prince Alexander Kurakin, before his death, never again mentioned the name of his niece. The children of the Chicherins, four sons and two daughters, received the rights of legitimate children by the Highest Decree in December 1819, after the death of their mother. She died in May 1819 and was buried in the Monastery of Saint Sergius, near Saint Petersburg.
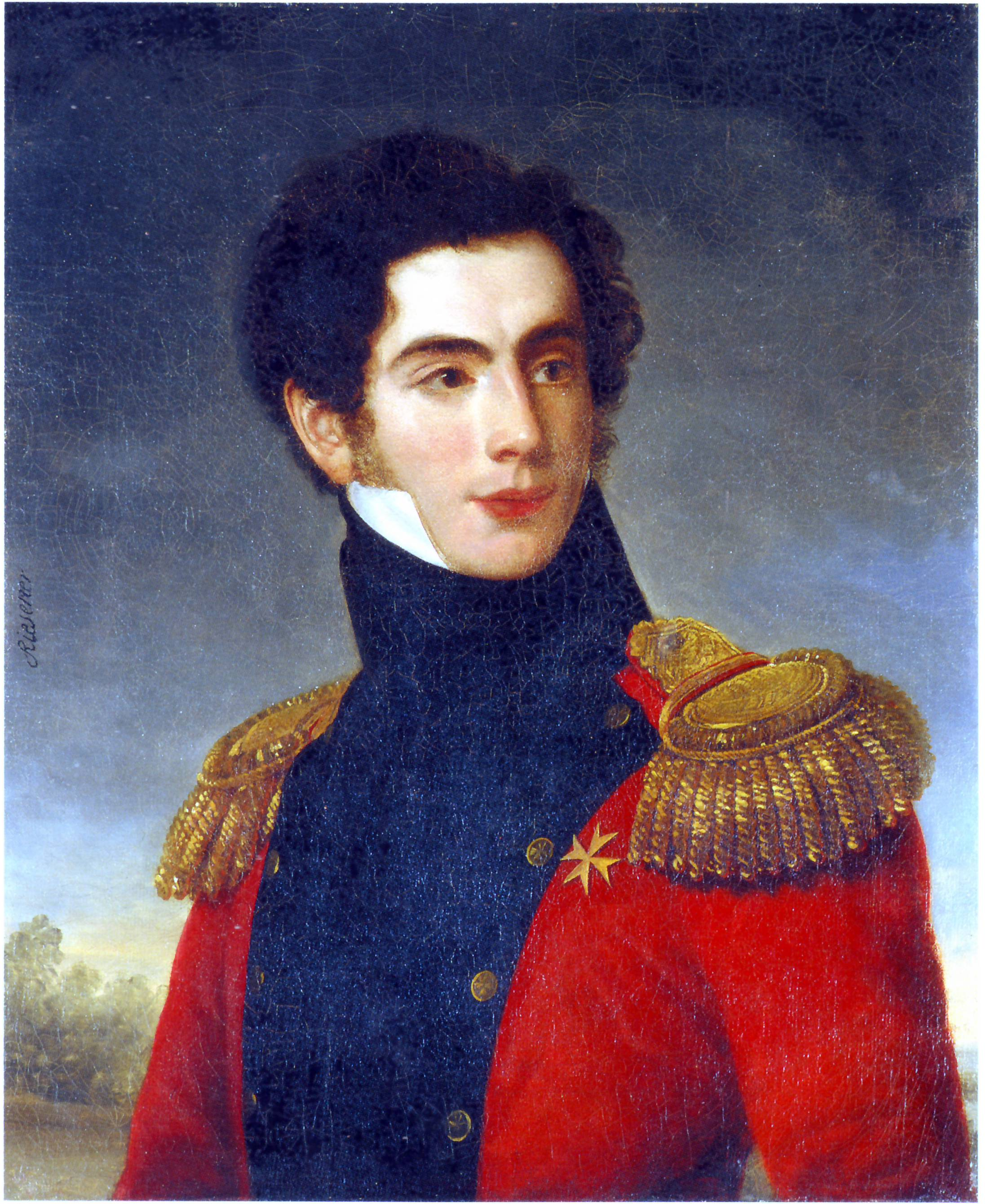
Boris Alekseevich, son

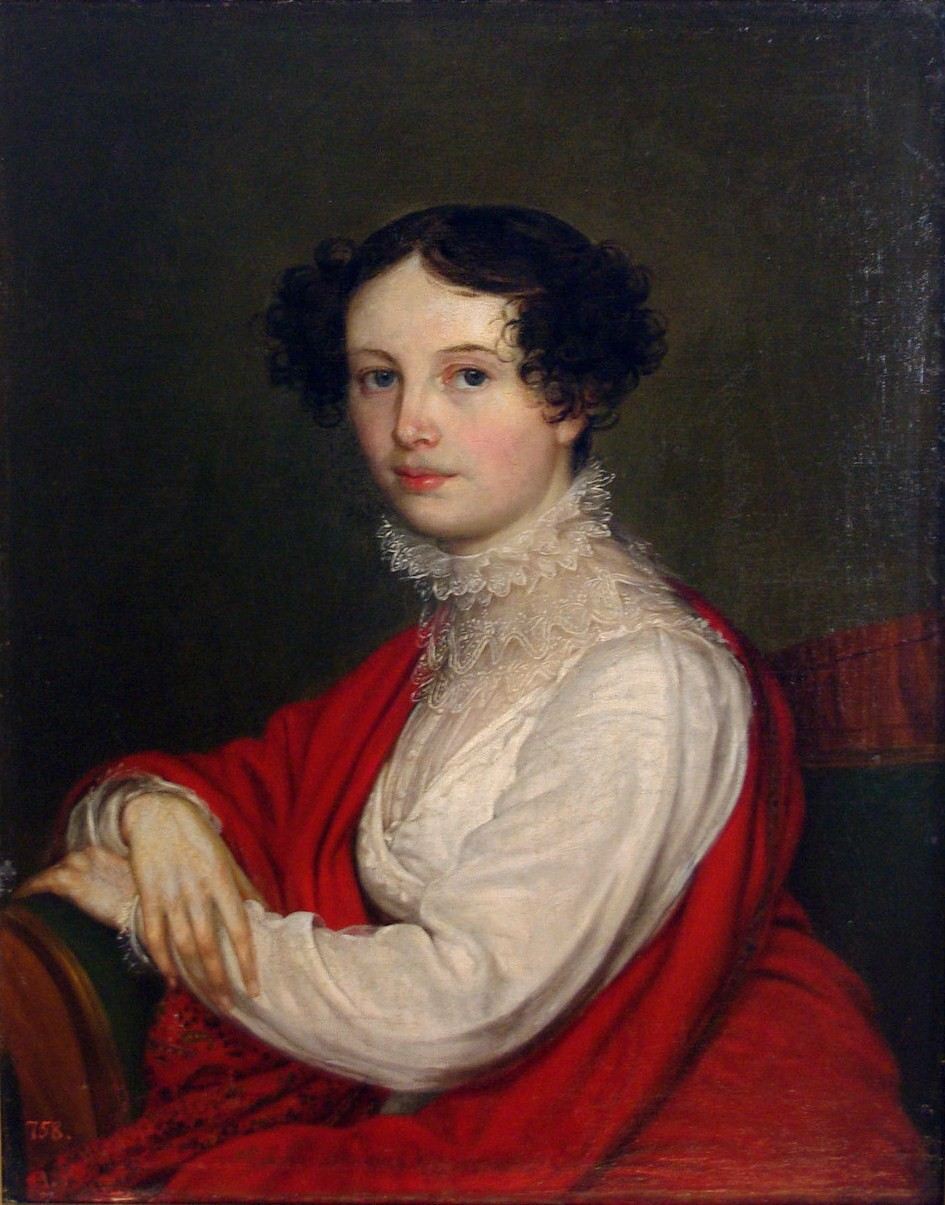
Elizaveta Borisovna, daughter-in-law

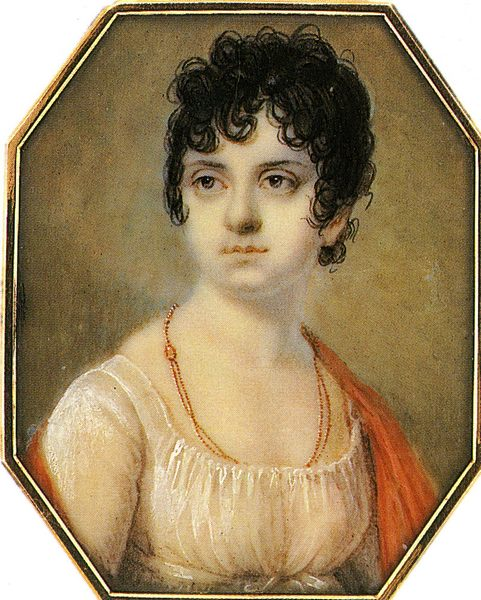
Elena Alekseevna, daughter

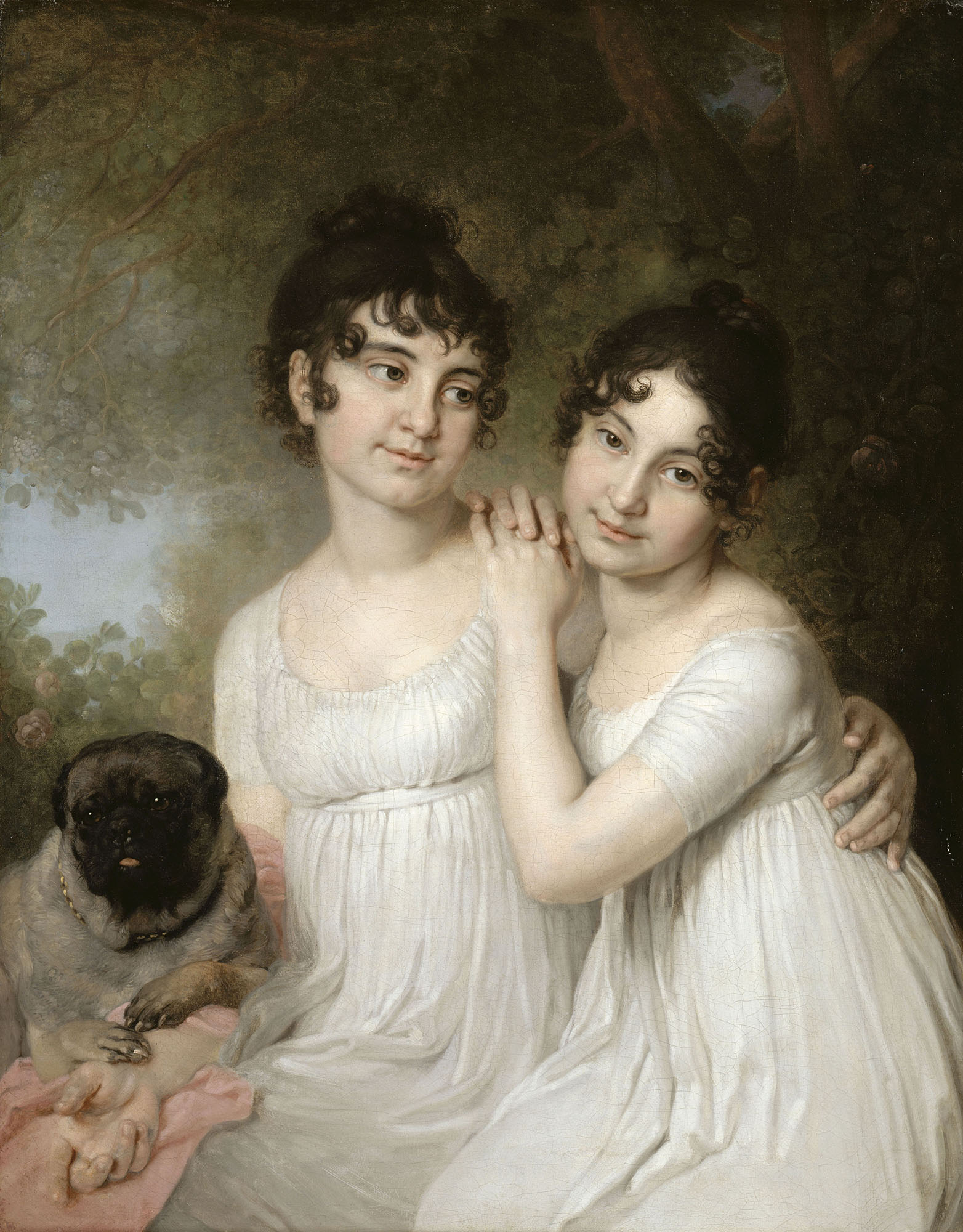
Elena and Alexandra, daughters

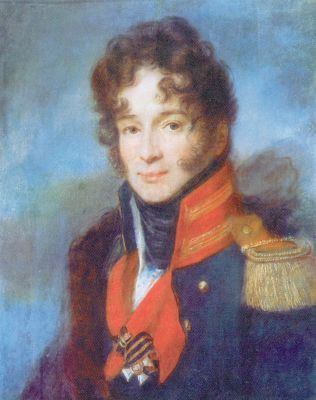
Peter Chicherin, son-in-law

== Sources ==
- Kurakin, Prince Alexey Borisovich // Russian Biographical Dictionary: In 25 volumes / Under the Supervision of Alexander Polovtsov. 1896–1918.
- Kurakins // Brockhaus and Efron Encyclopedic Dictionary: in 86 Volumes (82 Volumes and 4 Additional) – Saint Petersburg, 1890–1907.
- Alexander Kolpakidi, Alexander Sever (2010). Special Services of the Russian Empire. Moscow: Yauza Eksmo. pp. 72–74. ISBN 978-5-699-43615-6.

Preceded by Victor Kochubey	Minister of the Interior of the Russian Empire; 1807 – 1810	Succeeded by Osip Kozodavlev
