= Yury Neledinsky-Meletsky =

Russian poet (1752–1829)

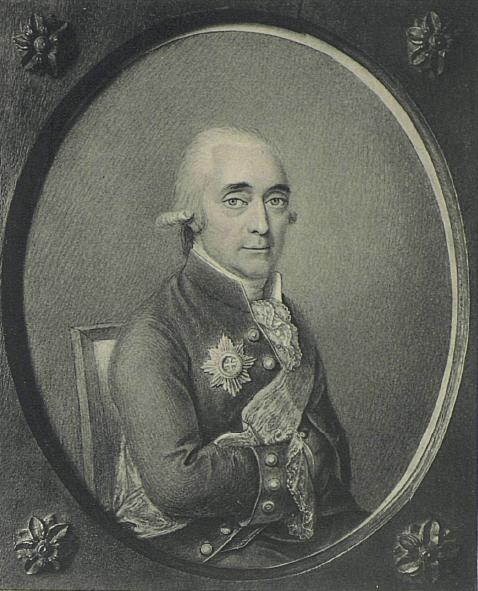
- contemporary portrait (edited 1905)
- Born: September 17, 1751 Moscow, Russia
- Died: February 25, 1828 (aged 76) Kaluga, Russia
- Language: Russian
- Literary movement: Classicism; Sentimentalism

Yury Aleksandrovich Neledinsky-Meletsky (Ю́рий Алекса́ндрович Неле́динский-Меле́цкий; 1751–1828) was a Russian poet, soldier, senator and a cabinet secretary during the reign of Paul I of Russia.

== Biography ==
His father was of the Neledinsky-Meletsky noble family (descended from a Polish nobleman of the Mielec family), his mother was a princess (Kurakina). His mother died early and his father was abroad, so he grew up with his paternal grandmother in Moscow and later, at age 13, he moved to his maternal grandmother, Aleksandra Kurakina, in Petersburg, where he came under the influence of the European Enlightenment and became acquainted with the future tsar Paul.

In 1769, he went to the University of Strasbourg, where he studied French, Italian and German. In 1770, he entered the Russian army, participating in the siege of Bender and the Crimea campaign in the Russo-Turkish War of 1768–1774. His first published poem was dedicated to the generals under whom he served, Petr Panin and Vasily Dolgoruky. In 1773, he served under Mikhail Kamensky and rose to the rank of 2nd major. After the war, he served under Nicholas Repnin. He retired from the army in 1785 with the rank of colonel.

In 1786, he married princess Ekaterina Khovanskaya (1762–1813), with whom he had a son and two daughters, and began to dedicate himself to literature. With the accession of his childhood friend as Paul I in 1796, Neledinsky was given the rank of state councillor, but due to a court intrigue he was removed from office and two years later made senator in Moscow. In 1813, he again moved to Petersburg and became a senator there. Over the next ten years, he was under the protection of empress Maria Feodorovna and became well known as a court poet.

He retired in 1826 and moved to Kaluga, where he died two years later.

== Legacy ==
The works of Neledinsky-Meletsky were edited together with those of Anton Delvig in 1850 by A.F. Smirdin. He is not now remembered as a great Russian author of his time; the Brockhaus and Efron Encyclopedic Dictionary calls him a "gifted amateur", judging that his works are now only of interest to literary historians, while emphasizing his popularity among his contemporaries; he was praised by Pushkin, and Konstantin Batyushkov called him "the Anacreon and Chaulieu of our time", setting him above Ippolit Bogdanovich. Among his works that remain known in modern Russia is the "folk style" poem Песня ("A Song", 1796; incipit Выду ль я на реченьку "When I go down to the river").

== See also ==
- Нелединский-Мелецкий, Юрий Александрович, Brockhaus and Efron Encyclopedic Dictionary (1890—1907).
- Russian Biographical Dictionary (1896—1918).
- Literary Encyclopedia (1929—1939).
