= Alexander Kurakin (1697) =

Russian diplomat

Alexander Borisovich Kurakin
- Александр Борисович Куракин
- Alexander Borisovich Kurakin painted by an unknown painter
- Born: August 10, 1697
- Died: October 13, 1749 (aged 52)
- Occupations: Diplomat, senator
- Spouse: Alexandra Ivanovna Panina (1711 – 1786)
- Children: Boris-Leonty, Anna, Tatiana, Agrafena, Catherine, Alexandra, Natalia, Anastasia, Praskovia
- Parents: Prince Boris Ivanovich Kurakin (father); Ksenia Fedorovna Lopukhina (mother)
- Awards: Order of Saint Andrew; Order of Saint Alexander Nevsky

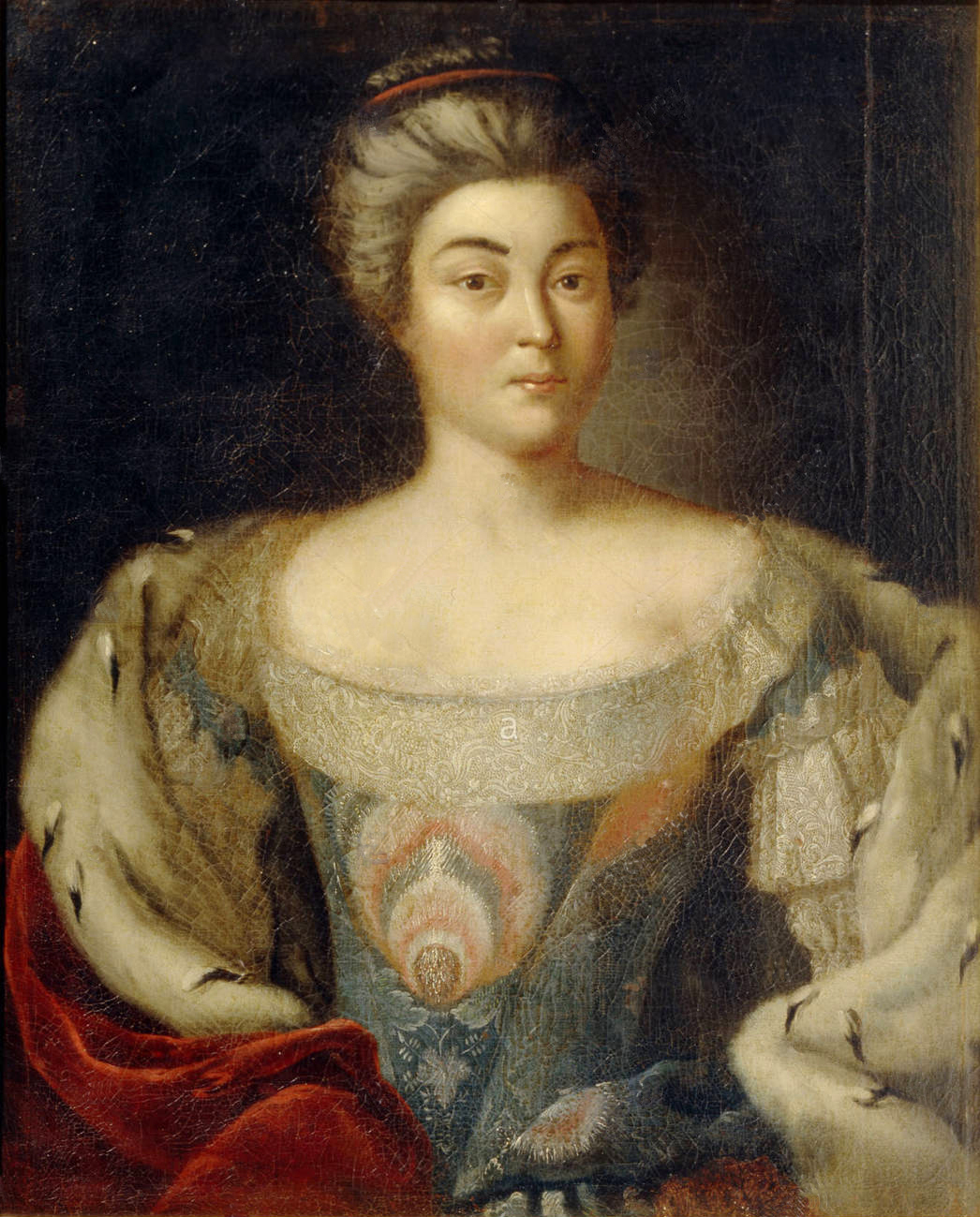
Alexandra Ivanovna, spouse

Prince Alexander Borisovich Kurakin (Russian: Алекса́ндр Бори́сович Кура́кин; August 10, 1697 – October 13, 1749) was a statesman and diplomat from the Kurakin family: an Active Privy Councillor, the Ober-Stallmeister (1736), a senator.

== Biography ==
From the Lithuanian Gediminid princely family. Born into the family of Prince Boris Ivanovich (1676 – 1727) and his first wife Ksenia Fyodorovna, née Lopukhina (1677 – 1698). On the mother's side, Tsarevich Alexei Petrovich was the first cousin. At a young age lost his mother.

From childhood he accompanied his father on trips abroad, where he received education and studied several European languages. In 1722 he received the rank of the chamber junker and was appointed adviser to the embassy in The Hague. However, in May 1722 he was sent to the French court, where he acted together with his father, who accompanied him as a private person. Kurakins managed to achieve the assistance of France in maintaining peace with the Ottoman Empire during the Persian campaign. In 1724, Boris Ivanovich Kurakin was appointed Ambassador Extraordinary and Plenipotentiary to France, Alexander Borisovich Kurakin was appointed a representative at the French court with the award of the rank of chamberlain (May 15, 1724). Diplomats were given the task of obtaining consent for the marriage of Princess Elizabeth to King Louis XV. However, this project failed. He patronized Vasily Trediakovsky, who studied abroad, who dedicated to him his translation of the poem "Riding to the Island of Love". After the death of his father in 1727 he was appointed ambassador in Paris. Ernst Munnich in his "Notes" wrote:

In Paris, we found Prince Alexander Borisovich Kurakin, who, on the death of his father, was left in France for business related to Russia, and was expecting the arrival of Count Golovkin in order to go to Moscow himself.

Returning to Russia, he occupied a high position at the court, being a great uncle of Emperor Peter II. He took part in the intrigues that contributed to the fall of Menshikov.

During the reign of Anna Ioannovna became a supporter of her favorite Biron, giving support in the struggle with Volynsky. In 1736 he was appointed Head of the Palace Stable Office. In the same year he was included in the General Court of the case of Prince Dmitry Golitsyn. In 1739 he was appointed ambassador to Berlin, but did not accept the post.

In the 1730s, in pursuance of the will of the father, using the capital left to him for this purpose, he organized a hospital for the impoverished officers with the Church of Saint Nicholas the Wonderworker behind the Red Gate. Later, this institution was named Kurakin Almshouse and host today the Moscow House of Nationalities.

During the signing of the will by the Empress Anna Ioannovna, Kurakin was the first to nominate Ernst Biron as a regent for the young emperor Ivan Antonovich. Under the ruler Anna Leopoldovna, he received the Order of Saint Andrew the First-Called, later fell into disgrace for some time, but was forgiven by a decree of April 24, 1741. From December 12, 1741 – senator.

== Marriage and children ==
Prince Alexander Borisovich Kurakin married Alexandra Ivanovna Panina (1711 – 1786) on April 26, 1730, as affirmed in pre-revolutionary publications, the grand-niece of the Most Serene Prince Menshikov. Her sister was married to another diplomat of Peter's time, Ivan Neplyuev. In their marriage were born:

- Anna Alexandrovna (1731 – 1749);
- Tatyana Alexandrovna (1732 – 1754), was the first wife of Alexander Neledinsky-Meletsky (1729 – 1804);
- Boris (Leonty) Aleksandrovich (1733 – 1764), senator, president of the Economy Board and Chamber Board; he was married to Elena Stepanovna Apraksina (1735 – 1769);
- Agrafena Alexandrovna (1734 – 1791), not married, since December 9, 1749, is a maid of honor of Empress Elizaveta Petrovna, and during the reign of Catherine the Great was considered "on leave";
- Catherine Alexandrovna (1735 – 1802), married to Prince Ivan Lobanov-Rostovsky;
- Alexandra Alexandrovna (1736 – 1739);
- Natalya Alexandrovna (1737 – 1798), State Lady, the wife of Field Marshal Prince Nikolai Repnin;
- Anastasia Alexandrovna (died 1739, in the third month);
- Praskovya Alexandrovna (1741 – 1755).
Portraits of children

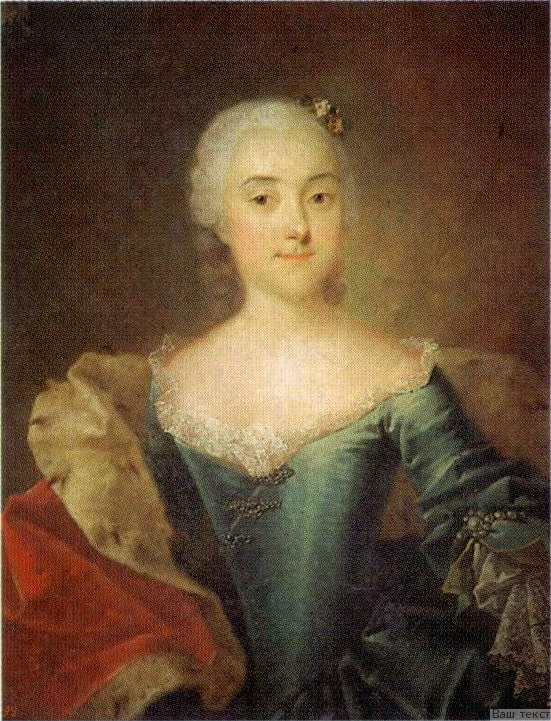
Anna

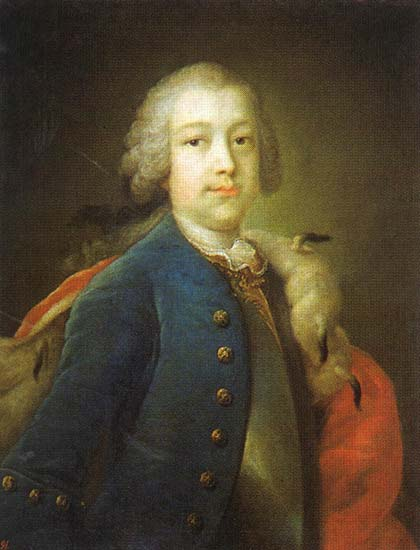
Boris

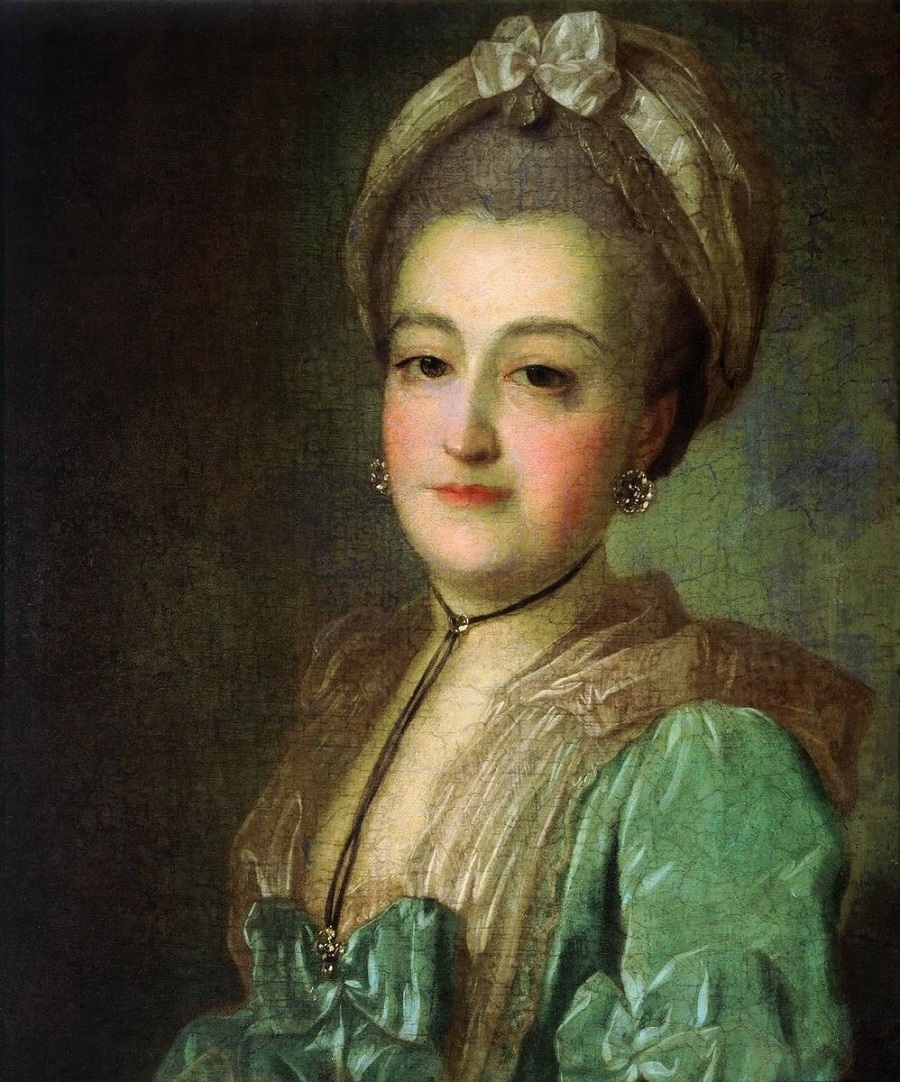
Agrafena

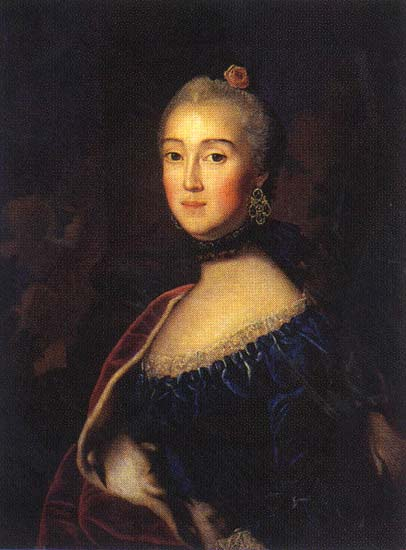
Catherine

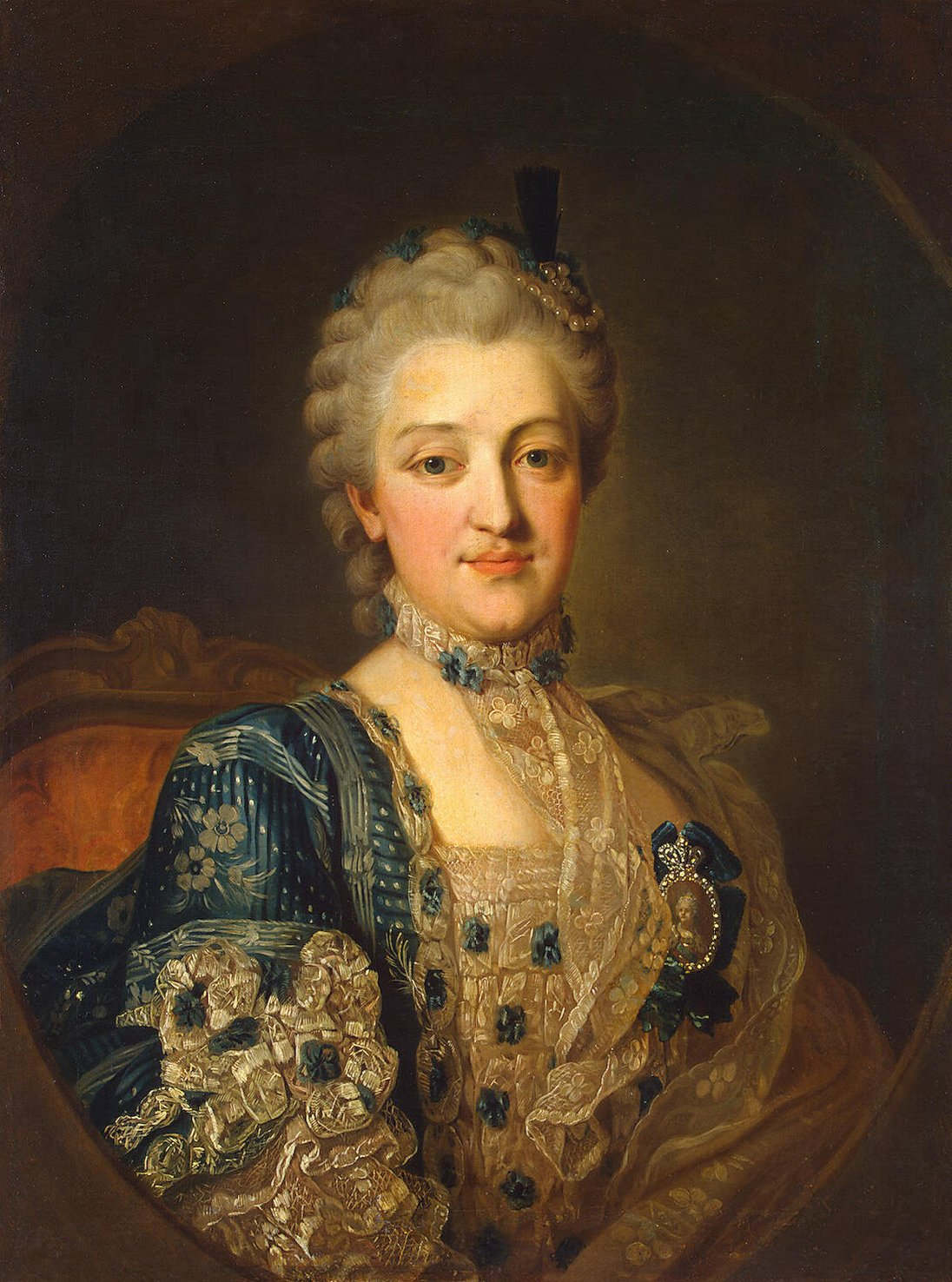
Natalia

== Awards ==
- Order of Saint Alexander Nevsky (June 28, 1730)
- Order of Saint Andrew

== Embassy Dacha ==
The dachas ("Primorsky Yards") of Prince Alexander Borisovich Kurakin and his sister, Princess Tatyana Golitsyna, were on the Petergof road in Ligovo next door.

The Kurakin's Dacha had the unofficial name "Embassy Dacha". In Uritsk, a large pond was known, which was left over from the Embassy Dacha, in which the locals loved to swim. Nowadays, at the place of dacha, there is Partizan Herman Street, next to the Krasnoselsky administration building.

The dacha of fieldmarshal's wife Golitsyna was located to the east, later was known as "dacha Dernova", and in Soviet times became Uritsk hospital. After the war, City Hospital No. 15 and Avantgarde Street were built here.

== Sources ==
- Kravets, Sergey (2010). Great Russian Encyclopedia. Moscow: Great Russian Encyclopedia. p. 377. ISBN 978-5-85270-347-7.
