= Pavel Kurakin =

Russian footballer

Personal information
- Date of birth: 3 December 1966 (age 59)
- Place of birth: Kolchugino, Russian SFSR
- Height: 1.75 m (5 ft 9 in)
- Positions: Defender; midfielder

Youth career
- FC Metallurg Kolchugino

Senior career*
Years	Team	Apps	(Gls)
1988	FC Metallurg Kolchugino		
1989–1993	FC KAMAZ Naberezhnye Chelny	138	(5)
1993	→ FC KAMAZ-d Naberezhnye Chelny (loan)	15	(1)
1994	FC Metallurg Novotroitsk	23	(0)
1995	FC KAMAZ-Chally Naberezhnye Chelny	2	(0)
1995	→ FC KAMAZ-d Naberezhnye Chelny (loan)	5	(0)
1999	FC Kovrovets Kovrov (amateur)		
- * Club domestic league appearances and goals

Pavel Kurakin (Russian: Павел Куракин; born 3 December 1966 in Kolchugino) is a former Russian football player.
