= Pyotr Chicherin =

Russian general

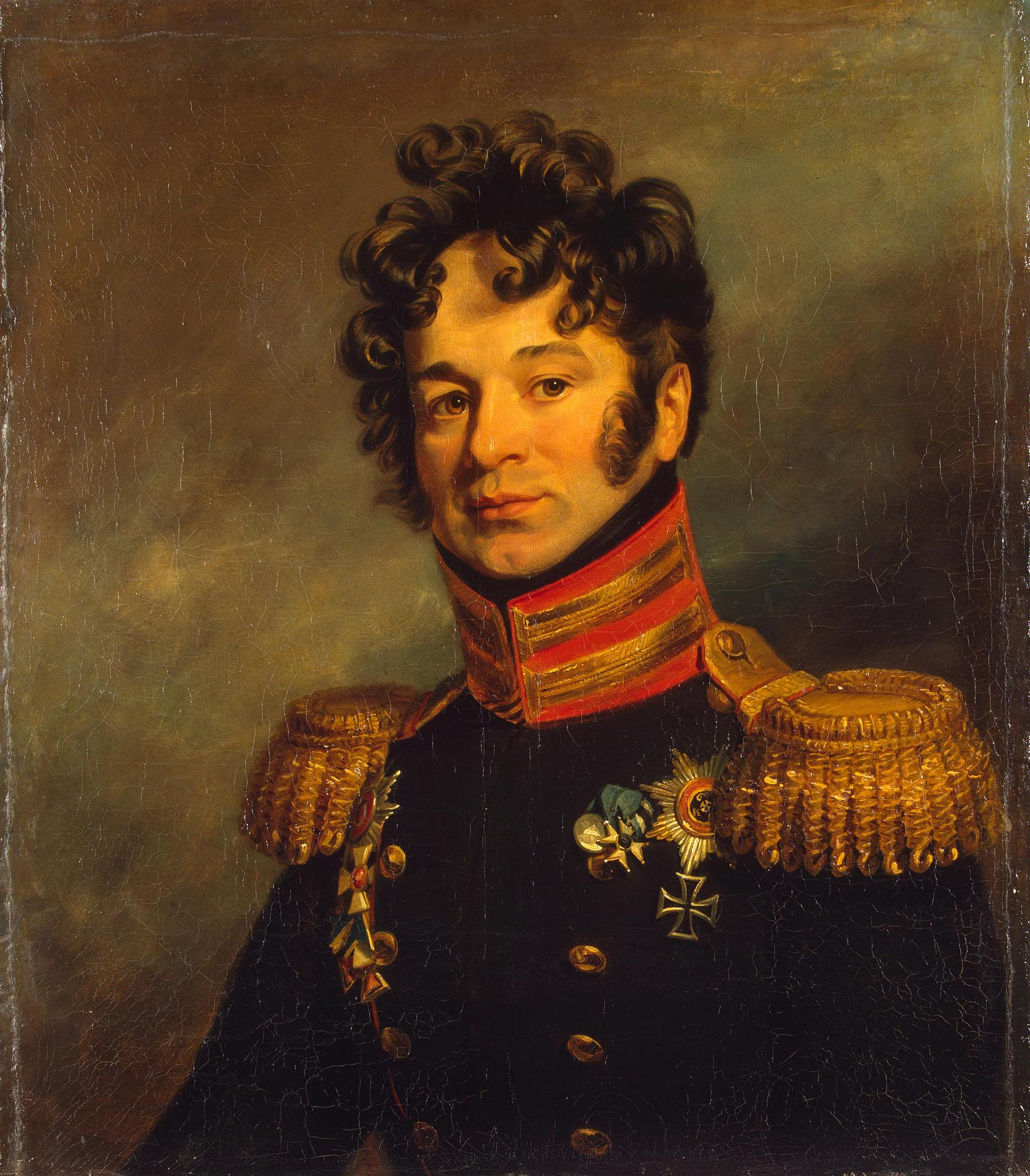
- Portrait of Chicherin by George Dawe
- Born: Pyotr Aleksandrovich Chicherin; 21 February 1778
- Died: 8 January 1849 (aged 70) Saint Petersburg
- Allegiance: Russian Empire
- Branch: Army
- Service years: 1785–1848
- Rank: Lieutenant General
- Awards: Order of St. George; Iron Cross

Pyotr Aleksandrovich Chicherin (Russian: Пётр Алекса́ндрович Чиче́рин) (21 February 1778 – 8 January 1849, new style) was a prominent Russian general that fought against Napoleon's invasion of Russia. As a result, his portrait was hung in the Military Gallery of the Winter Palace.

== Life ==
He entered the Preobrazhensky Regiment on 8 April 1785, and on 1 May 1789 he was transferred to the palace mounted regiment. On 7 September 1797 he was promoted to cornet and on 4 December 1803 to colonel. He took part in the Battle of Austerlitz and also in the campaign of 1806–1807.

On 12 December 1809 he became the commander of a dragoon's regiment, with which he took part in countering the French invasion of Russia. On 6 December 1812 he was promoted to major general. Later he became the commander of the Russian 1st Light Cavalry Division. On 15 December 1825 he was promoted to adjutant general and on 1 January 1826 to lieutenant general.

From 1828 to 1829 he fought against the Ottoman Empire and in 1831 against Poland. On 22 April 1834 he was promoted to general of the cavalry.
