= Active Privy Councillor, 1st class =

Civil rank in the Russian Empire

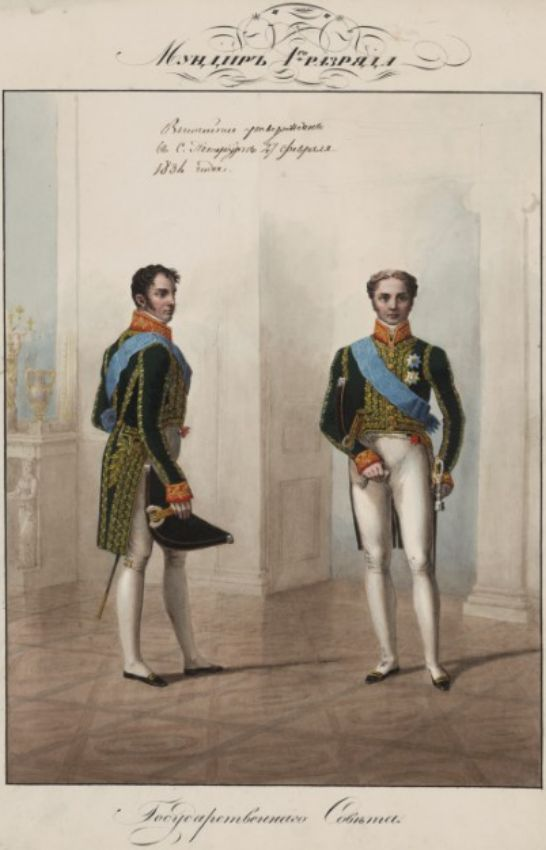
Uniform of Actual Privy Councillor, 1st class

Active Privy Councillor, 1st class (Russian: действительный тайный советник первого класса, deystvitelnyi taynyi sovetnik pervogo klassa) was a civil position (class) in the Russian Empire, according to the Table of Ranks introduced by Peter the Great in 1722. It was the highest civil rank and equal to those of Chancellor, General Field Marshal in the Army, and General Admiral in the Navy. The rank holder should be addressed as Your High Excellency (Russian: Ваше Высокопревосходительство, Vashe Vysokoprevoskhoditelstvo).

== Overview ==
The rank was granted to those persons who, by virtue of their official positions, could not be called Chancellors. During the existence of the Russian Empire, only 13 people received that rank; two of whom later became Chancellors. Almost all of them were representatives of Russian noble families: the Panins, Golitsyns, Lopukhins, Stroganoffs, Kurakins, Razumovskys. In contrast to the rank of the Chancellor, the title of Active Privy Councillor, 1st class was assigned until the collapse of the Russian Empire in 1917, when the rank was abolished by the Decree on the Abolition of Estates and Civil Ranks.

== Active Privy Councillors, 1st class ==
1. 1773 – Count Nikita Ivanovich Panin (1718-1783)
2. 1796 – Prince Alexander Bezborodko (1747-1799), from 1797 - Chancellor
3. 1801 – Count Alexander Vorontsov (1741-1805), from 1802 - Chancellor
4. 1807 – Prince Alexander Kurakin (1752-1818)
5. 1811 – Count Alexander Sergeyevich Stroganov (1733-1811)
6. 1814 – Prince Pyotr Lopukhin (1753-1827)
7. 1819 – Prince Andrey Razumovsky (1752-1836)
8. 1826 – Prince Alexei Borisovich Kurakin (1759-1829)
9. 1841 – Prince Alexander Golitsyn (1773-1844)
10. 1852 – Prince Sergey Golitsyn (1774-1859)
11. 1868 – Prince Pavel Gagarin (1789-1872)
12. 1906 – Count Dmitri Solsky (1833-1910)
13. 1916 – Ivan Goremykin (1839-1917)

== See also ==
- Privy council
- Supreme Privy Council of Imperial Russia, founded on 19 February 1726
- Wirklicher Geheimer Rat, is a similar rank in Germany
