= Boris Alekseevich Kurakin =

Russian politician and diplomat (1784–1850)

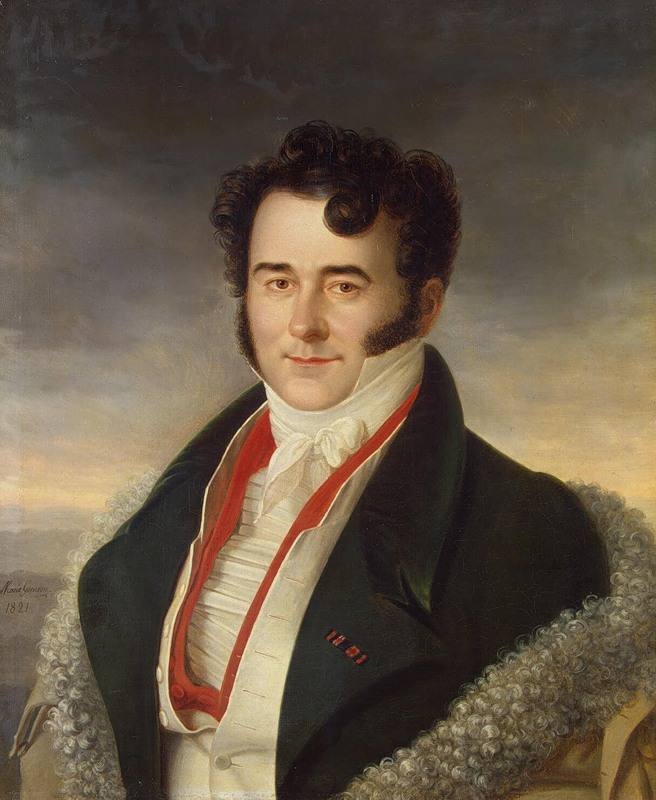
Portrait

Prince Boris Alekseevich Kurakin (Russian: Бори́с Алексе́евич Кура́кин; 13 September 1784 - 2 October 1850) was a Russian politician and diplomat.

== Early life ==
He was the eldest child of Alexey Borisovich Kurakin (1759-1829) and his wife Princess Natalia Ivanovna Kurakina (1766-1831). One of his godparents was Catherine II of Russia. For seven years he was taught by Professor Bruckner, who hid his support of French Revolutionary ideas from his pupil. He was also taught religion by Mikhail Speransky, who remained his friend and adviser for the rest of his life. In 1799, aged 15, he became a junker at the Collegium of Foreign Affairs, becoming chamberlain in 1804.

== Marriage ==
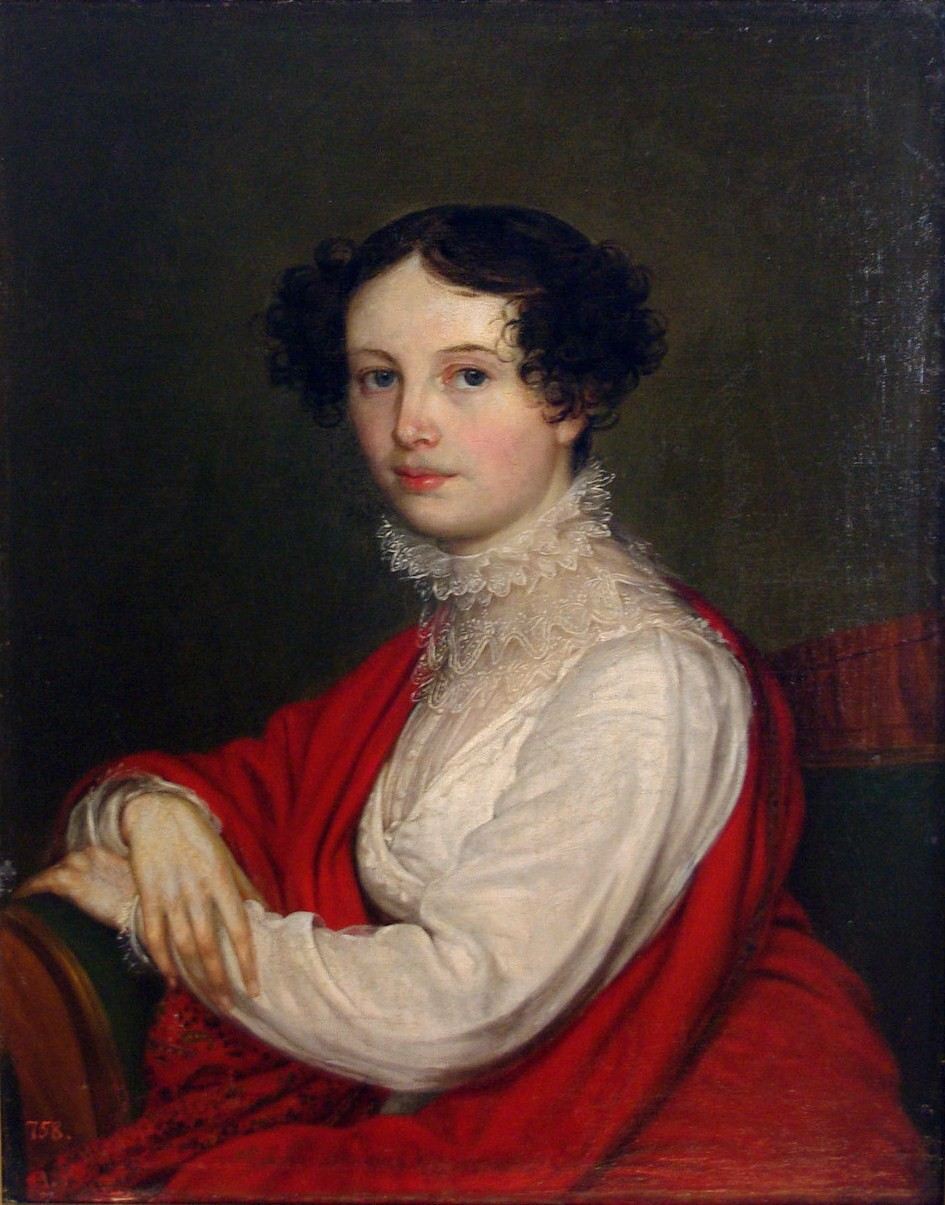
Portrait of Elizaveta Borisovna Golicyna by Aleksandr Grigor'evič Varnek, 1810.

In Vienna in 1808 he married princess Elizaveta Borisovna Golicyna (1790-1871), daughter of Boris Andreevich Golitsyn, with whom he had three children:

- Aleksej Borisovič (4 May 1809 – 20 December 1872), married Julija Fëdorovna Golicyna, granddaughter of Sergej Fëdorovič Golicyn;
- Tat'jana Borisovna (1810-24 February 1857);
- Aleksandr Borisovič (1813-1870).

The marriage was not entirely successful. The princess was religious and not only converted to Catholicism, but also severely burned her hand in a brazier during a moment of religious exaltation, leading to its amputation, and finally went insane.

== Later career ==
In 1809 he was sent to review the Volga provinces and the following year his father (then Russian ambassador in Paris) invited him to carry congratulations to Napoleon on his marriage to Marie-Louise of Austria. After his return to Russia he served in the Finance Ministry, but gained no promotion for the following eleven years, leading him to the conclusion that gossip had turned the Tsar against him.

On 13 January 1822 he was made a senator with the rank of privy counsellor, becoming noted for his independence in resolving cases, sharp judgements, direct and firm convictions, integrity and honesty, all of which earned him the Tsar's favour. In 1826 he was appointed to the Supreme Criminal Court to hear the Decembrists case and the following year was entrusted with an audit of Western Siberia.

He finally retired in 1833. As the only male survivor of the Kurakin family, he had inherited several estates. At one of his favourites, the Stepanovsky estate in the Tver province, he carried out extensive construction work, building a whole town near the house with a theatre, tower, obelisks, gates, streets and avenues, in which he settled people. He died in Kharkov in 1850 and was buried in the Sviatohirsk Lavra Monastery in that province.
