= Natalia Kurakina =

Russian composer

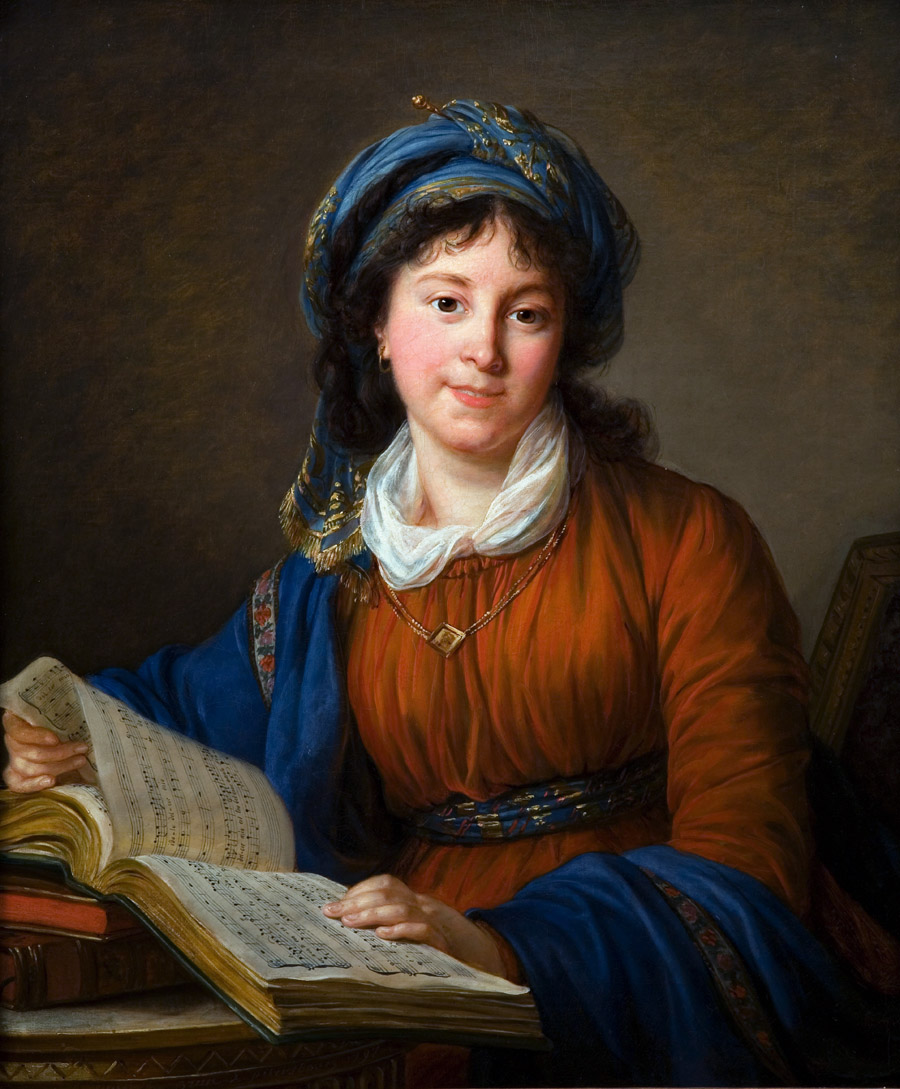
Portrait of Natalia Ivanovna Kurakina, 1797, by Élisabeth Vigée Le Brun

Princess Natalia Ivanovna Kurakina (Russian: Ната́лья Ива́новна Кура́кина; 16 August 1766 - 2 July 1831) née Golovina (Russian: Головина́) was a Russian composer, singer, and harpist in the 18th and 19th centuries. In her lifetime, Kurakina has 45 songs attributed to her and at the time of this writing, only one other Russian composer, Osip Antonovich Kozlovsky (1757-1831), is known to have more. In 1795, a collection of eight of her songs, Huit romances composees et arangees pour la harpe, was published by Breitkopf. Additionally she was published by Gerstenberg and Dittmar which were other major music publishers in this time. Her compositions were written specifically for the salon environment and thus were written for either piano or harp accompaniment and voice. The Portrait of the princess, by the celebrated artist Élisabeth Vigée Le Brun and held by the Utah Museum of Fine Arts, shows her holding an album of music which could possibly be her own.

Kurakina started performing in salons at the age of fourteen and continued after she married Prince Aleksei Borisovich Kurakin (1759-1829). After her marriage, she and her husband lived and performed at the court of Tsar Paul I. A set of three of her compositions titled Trois romances, pour le piano, composées par la Princesse Nathalie de Kourakin were published and performed at the salon of Empress Elizabeth, the wife of Tsar Alexander I. Additionally, most of her compositions are considered to be French romances which meet Rousseau's definition. In 1797, she became a Dame of Lesser Cross of the Order of Saint Catherine and became a lady-in-waiting in 1826.

After her husband had a falling out with Tsar Paul I, she and her husband moved to France and she hosted a Paris salon in 1815 and traveled from 1816 to 1819, 1822 to 1824, and 1829 to 1830. Her travel diary which was written in French, was eventually published in 1903.

== Further listening ==
These two albums contain songs which Kurakina composed in addititon to other female composers in the 18th century.

- Music of the Russian Princesses
- Russian Women Composers of the 18th Century
