= Boris Kurakin =

Russian diplomat (1676–1727)

Prince Boris Ivanovich Kurakin
- Князь Борис Иванович Куракин
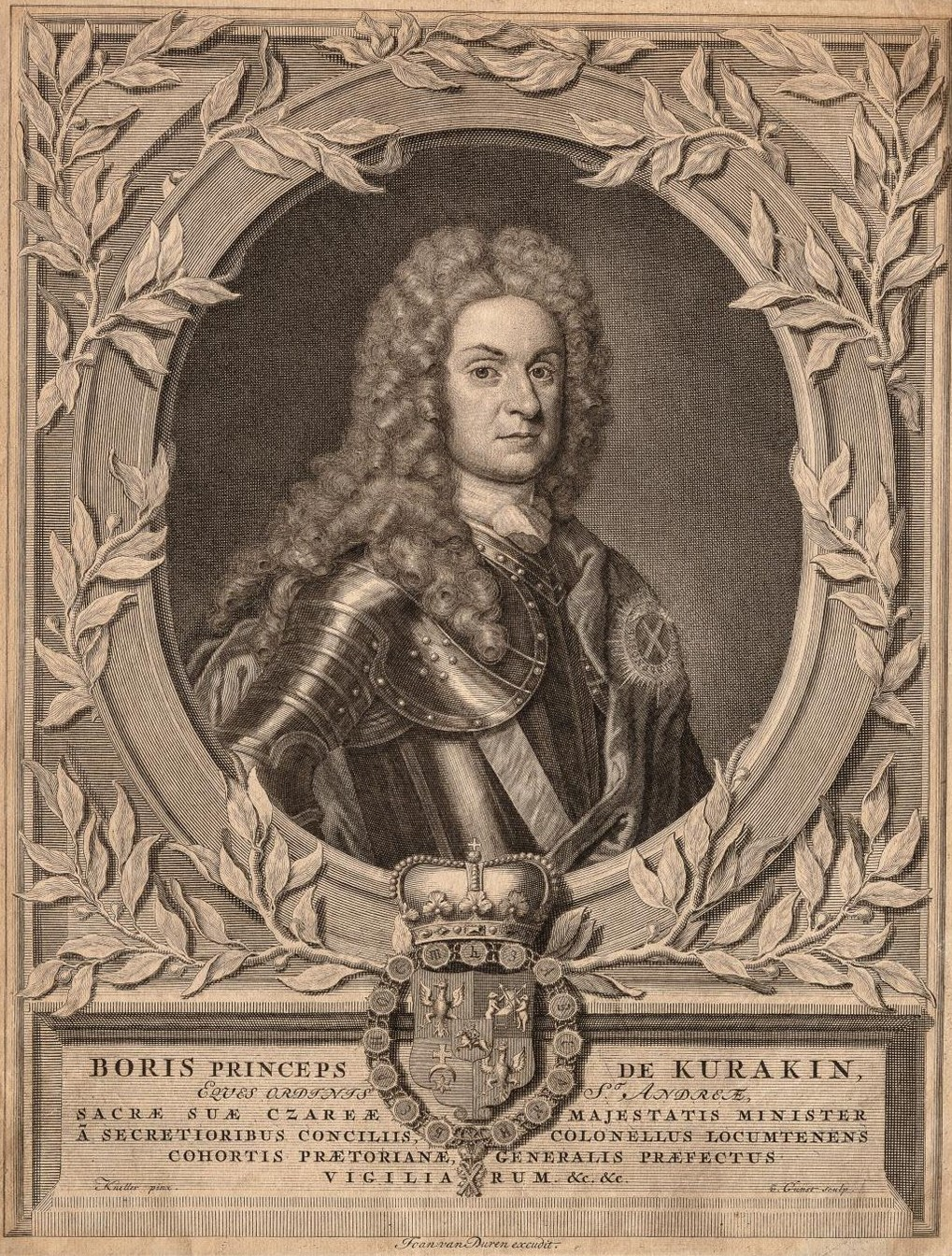

Russian Ambassador to France
- In office 1724–1727
- Monarch: Peter I

Supervisor of Russian Embassies to European Courts
- In office 1722–1723
- Monarch: Peter I

Personal details
- Born: 20 July 1676 Moscow, Tsardom of Russia
- Died: 17 October 1727 (aged 51) Paris, Kingdom of France
- Spouses: Xenia Fedorovna Lopukhina; Maria Fedorovna Urusova
- Children: Tatiana Borisovna Kurakina Alexander Borisovich Kurakin Ekaterina Borisovna Kurakina Sergei Borisovich Kurakin Vassili Borisovich Kurakin
- Parents: Ivan Grigorievich Kurakin (father); Feodosia Alekseevna Odoevskaya (mother)
- Occupation: Diplomat

Prince Boris Ivanovich Kurakin (Russian: Князь Бори́с Ива́нович Кура́кин; 30 July [O.S. 20 July] 1676 – 28 October [O.S. 17 October] 1727) was the third permanent Russian ambassador abroad, succeeding Andrey Matveyev in The Hague and one of the closest associates of Peter the Great. He was also the brother-in-law of the tsar, being married to Xenia Feodorovna Lopukhina, daughter of Feodor Abramovich Lopukhin and sister of Eudoxia Lopukhina.

== Early life ==
Boris was born in Moscow on 30 July [O.S. 20 July] 1676 to the House of Kurakin, one of the Gedyminid families of Muscovy.

== Career ==
Members of this family were promoted straight to the rank of okolnichy, skipping lower ranks like the stolnik. Due to the upheavals during the rule of Tsar Feodor III, he was appointed as part of the retinue of Tsar Peter the Great. The connections he made while in Muscovite court life led him to marry the sister of Eudoxia (Peter's first wife). In 1697, he participated in the Azov campaigns and then sent to Italy to learn navigation.

His long and honourable diplomatic career began in 1707, when he was sent to Rome to induce the pope not to recognize Charles XII's candidate, Stanislaus Leszczynski, as king of Poland. In 1709, Boris Kurakin was appointed commander of the Semenovsky Regiment during the Battle of Poltava. From 1708 to 1712, he represented Russia at London, Hanover, and the Hague successively, and, in 1713, was the principal Russian plenipotentiary at the peace congress of Utrecht. From 1716 to 1722, he held the post of ambassador at Paris, and when, in 1722, Peter set forth on his Persian campaign, Kurakin was appointed the supervisor of all the Russian ambassadors accredited to the various European courts. In 1723, he attempted to arrange the marriage of Elizaveta Petrovna to Louis XV. He died on 28 October [O.S. 17 October] 1727 in Paris.

== Legacy ==
Kurakin has been referred to as “the father of Russian diplomacy” for his role in shaping Russia’s early foreign policy. Contemporary accounts praised his diplomatic skill and political awareness. He played a significant role during the final stages of the Great Northern War, particularly in preventing Great Britain from declaring war against Peter's close ally, Denmark, at the crisis of the struggle. As Duc de Saint-Simon put it, "c'etait un grand homme, bien fait, qui sentait fort la grandeur de son origine, avec beaucoup d'esprit, de tour et d'instruction".

Kurakin was one of the best-educated Russians of his day, and his autobiography, carried down to 1709, is an important historical document. He intended to write a history of his own times with Peter the Great as the central figure, but got no further than the summary, entitled History of Tsar Peter Aleksievich and the People Nearest to Him (1682-1694). His vast archive was published in the 19th century, revealing Kurakin as a master of literary style. He is held responsible for introducing many new words to the Russian language.

== Family ==
Kurakin's descendants were also noted for their diplomatic careers. His son Alexander (1697–1749) was likewise ambassador to Paris, whereas the latter's grandson Alexander Kurakin (1752–1818) served as ambassador to Paris and Vienna under Alexander I and Vice-Chancellor of the Russian Empire in 1796.
