= Alexander Kurakin =

Russian statesman and diplomat

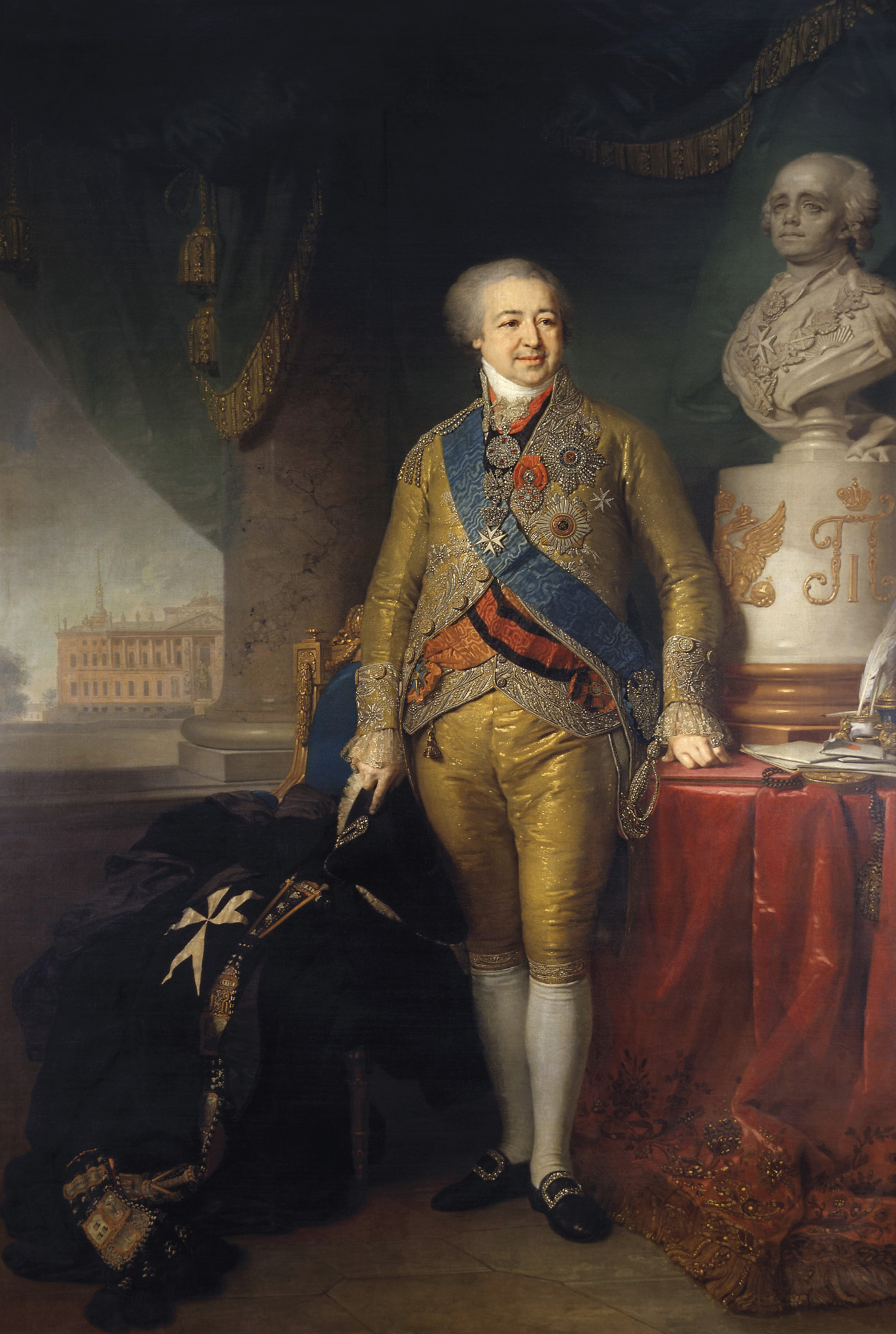
Portrait of Alexander B. Kurakin, by Vladimir Borovikovsky.

Prince Alexander Borisovich Kurakin, sometimes spelled Kourakine (Russian: Алекса́ндр Бори́сович Кура́кин; 18 January 1752 – 6 / 24 June 1818) was a Russian statesman and diplomat, a member of the State Council (from 1810), who was ranked Active Privy Counsellor 1st Class (see Table of Ranks).

== Life ==
Born in Moscow to a long line of Russian diplomats, he was the great-grandson of Boris Kurakin, a Russian ambassador and close associate of Peter the Great. He moved to St. Petersburg in 1764 following the death of his father, Boris Alexandrovich Kurakin. There he became acquainted with Great Prince (Grand Duke) Pavel Petrovich, the future Emperor Paul I of Russia, and remained one of his most trusted friends. This friendship, though, did not meet the approval of the then reigning Empress Catherine II, and so Kurakin was forced to depart abroad. In 1776, he was elected a foreign member of the Royal Swedish Academy of Sciences.

After Catherine II's death, Kurakin was allowed to return to St. Petersburg in 1796 and he resumed his career, becoming Vice Chancellor in 1796. During the reign of Alexander I Kurakin became the Ambassador of Russia in Vienna in 1806. Two years later, he replaced Ambassador Pyotr Tolstoy in Paris.

== Ambassador in Paris ==
As ambassador in Paris, Kurakin was known for two political acts: taking an active part in the arrangements for the signing of the Treaty of Tilsit, and warning the Tsar about the upcoming war with the French.

From 1810 Kurakin wrote numerous notes to Tsar Alexander, warning him of imminent war. After the last futile attempt to reconcile the Russian-French relationship at his meeting with Napoleon on 15 April 1812, the subsequent departure of Napoleon marking the start of Napoleon's invasion of Russia led to Kurakin resigning as ambassador.

In Paris's higher circles, Kurakin was famously referred to as a "diamond prince", due to magnificence and richness of his costumes. It was one of these costumes that actually saved his life during a fire that happened during a ball given by Schwarzenberg, the Austrian ambassador on 1 July 1810. While escorting the women out of the blazing hall, he fell to the ground and was trampled by the panicking crowd, but his richly decorated coat protected him from the worst of the intense heat. Nevertheless, he was still badly burned and was confined to bed for several months.

He is also credited with introducing Russian-style service à la russe to France, where it replaced the previous service à la française.

He never married but he had illegitimate issue by Akulina Dmitrievna Samoilova, the Barons Wrjevsky, and by an unknown woman, the Barons Serdobin.

Preceded by Stepan Alekseyevich Kolychev (acting)	Imperial Chancellor of Russia (acting); 1801–1802	Succeeded by Alexander Romanovich Vorontsov
