= Dmitry Troshchinsky =

Dmitry Prokofievich Troshchinsky
- Дмитрий Прокофьевич Трощинский
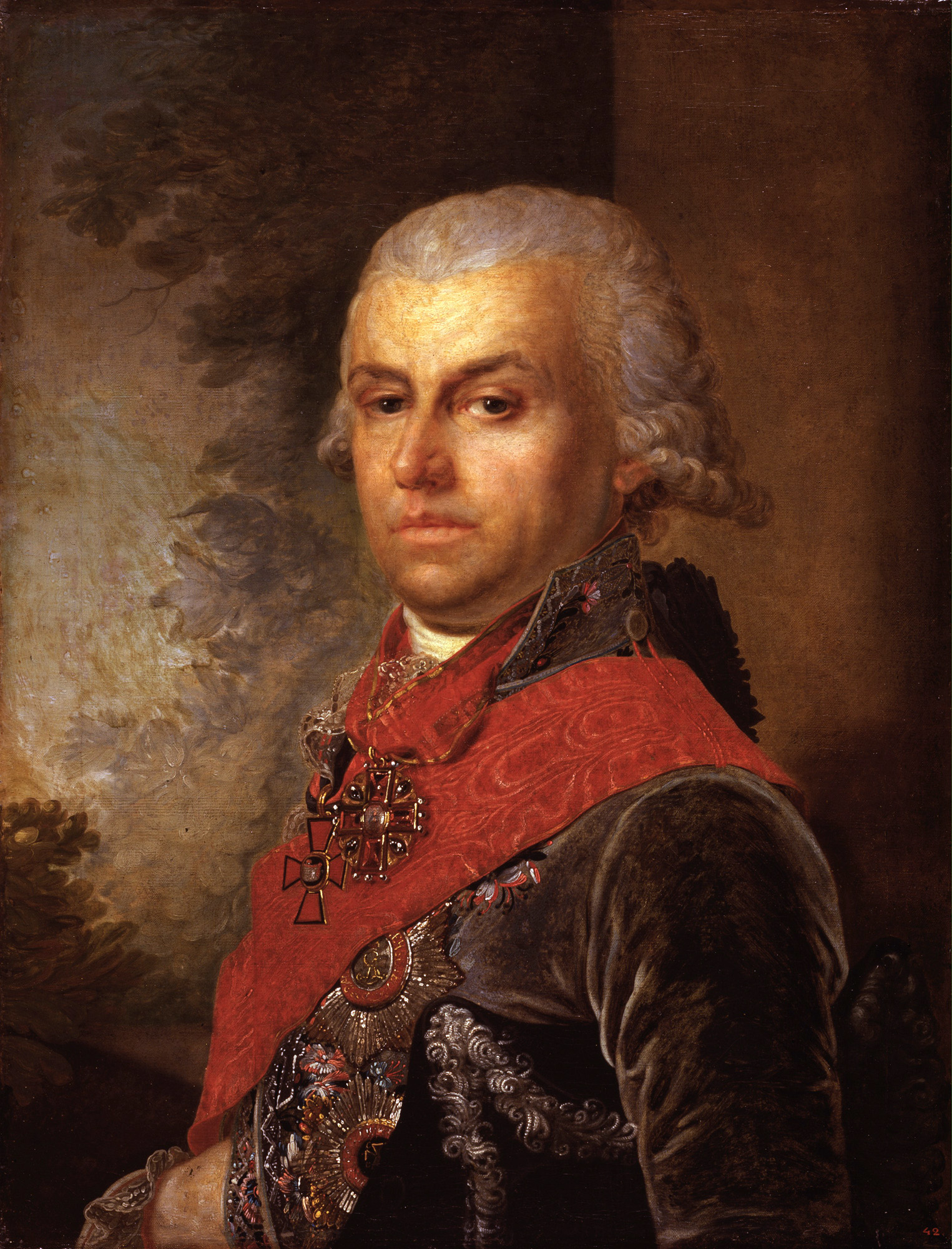
- Portrait of a work by Borovikovsky (1796/99)

Minister of Justice
- In office August 30, 1814 – August 25, 1817
- Preceded by: Ivan Dmitriev
- Succeeded by: Dmitry Lobanov–Rostovsky

Minister of the Court and Inheritance
- In office 1802–1806
- Preceded by: Nikolay Yusupov
- Succeeded by: Dmitry Guryev

Senator of the Russian Empire
- In office 1796–1800

Cabinet Secretary
- In office 1793–1795
- Preceded by: Gavriil Derzhavin
- Succeeded by: Adrian Gribovsky

Personal details
- Born: October 26, 1749
- Died: February 26, 1829 (aged 79)
- Relations: Troshchinsky family
- Parent: Prokofy Troshchinsky (father)
- Education: Kyiv Mohyla Academy
- Awards: Order of Saint Alexander Nevsky; Order of Saint Vladimir; Order of Saint Anna; Order of Saint John of Jerusalem

Dmitry Prokofievich Troshchinsky (Russian: Дмитрий Прокофьевич Трощинский; Ukrainian: Дмитро Прокопович Трощинський; October 26, 1749 – February 26, 1829) was a Russian Imperial statesman, senior Cabinet Secretary (1793–98), Prosecutor General (1814–17), Privy Councilor, senator, owner of the serf theater.

== Biography ==
Coming from the noble family of Troshchinsky. His great-grandfather – the Hadiach colonel Stepan Troshchinsky – was the nephew of hetman Ivan Mazepa. Dmitry's father, Prokofy Troshchinsky, was a Bunchuk comrade in the Hetmanate.

At the end of the course at the Kiev Academy, Dmitry Troshchinsky joined the Little Russian Collegium. He received the rank of regimental clerk in 1773. Being sent to Moldavia at the disposal of Prince Nikolai Repnin, Troshchinsky soon attracted the attention of the prince, who did not part with him until 1787, by his industriousness and efficiency. This year, Catherine II took a trip to the Crimea; she was accompanied by Count Alexander Bezborodko. Prince Repnin recommended to him Troshchinsky, as a reliable and experienced official.

In 1793, Troshchinsky was appointed a member of the Main Post Office and elevated to the rank of Secretary of State. This gave him the opportunity to attract the attention of Catherine II. In 1796, he received from the empress the town of Kagarlyk in the Kiev Governorate, the entire Kagarlyk village headquarters, as well as two village headquarters in the Podolsk Governorate. Troshchinsky accompanied emperor Paul I to Moscow for the coronation and was appointed senator and present in the council established at the educational society of noble maidens.

In 1800, he was dismissed from all posts and (according to Nathan Eidelman) took part in a conspiracy against Paul I. After the coup of 1801, he was reinstated in all posts and appointed by Emperor Alexander I a member of the Permanent State Council and head of the Postal Directorate of the empire, and when the ministries were established, he became the Minister of Allotments. Troshchinsky is also known for the fact that he wrote the famous manifesto on the accession to the throne of Alexander I, in which the tsar abdicated the policies of Paul I and solemnly vowed "to rule by God, as the people handed over to us according to the laws and in the heart of God, the honourable grandmother of our sovereign Empress Catherine the Great".

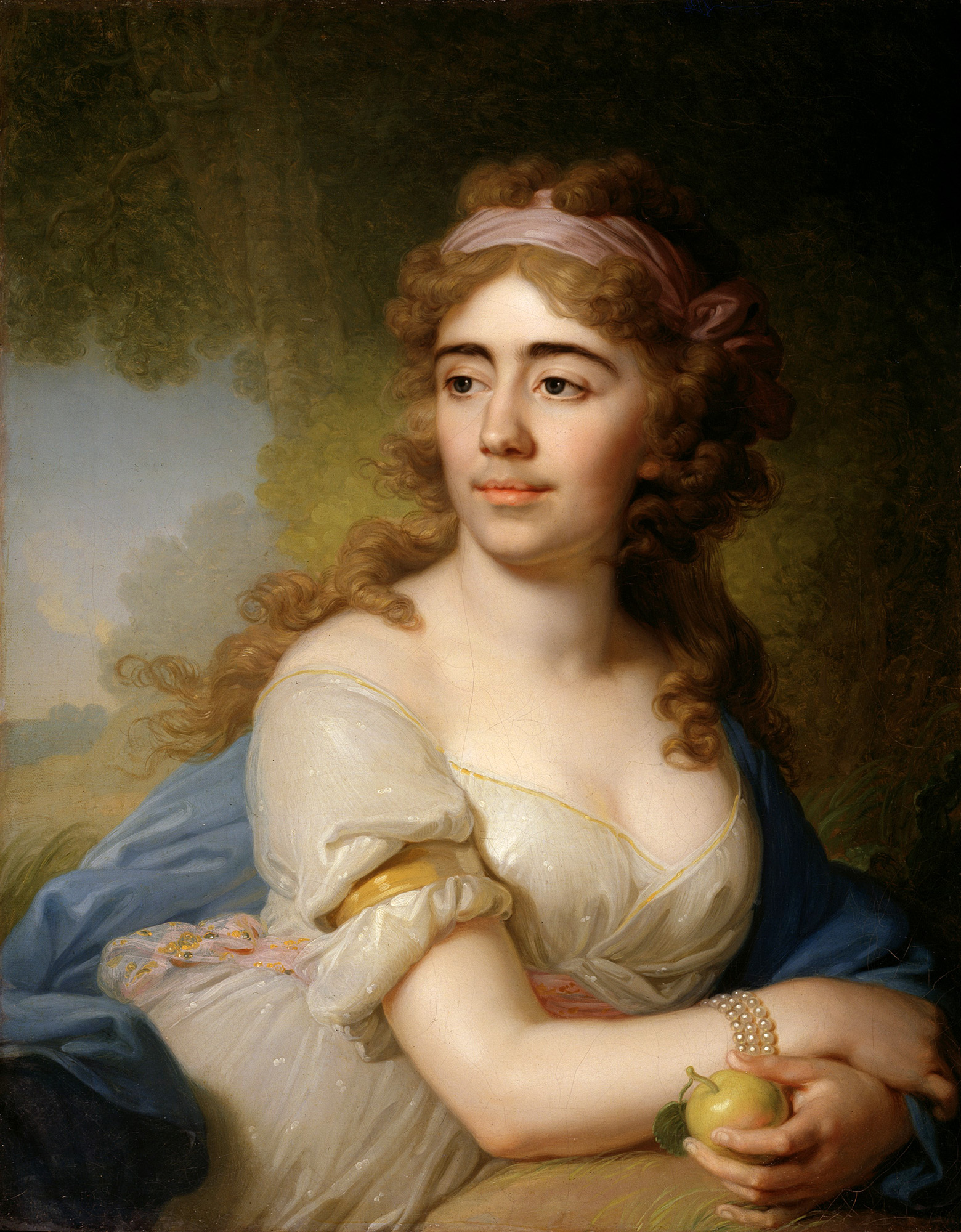
Skobeeva (her name is unknown) – daughter of the Kronstadt sailor, pupil and favorite of Dmitry Troshchinsky

Troshchinsky held the post of Minister of Allotments from 1802 to 1806, then he retired and moved to live in the village of Kibintsy, Mirgorod Uyezd. The Poltava nobility chose him as the provincial marshal.

From 1814 to 1817, Troshchinsky was the Minister of Justice. Having retired, he remained in Saint Petersburg for about five years, and then moved to Kibintsy, where he gathered the local landowners. Among the latter were the Gogol–Yanovsky family, the relatives of Troshchinsky by brother. Thanks to Troshchinsky, Nikolai Gogol was enrolled in the Nizhyn gymnasium.

He had extensive possessions in the Poltava Region, the Kiev Region, in Podolia and the Voronezh Province (over 70,000 dessiatins). In last years, Troshchinsky lived in his Khorbintsy estate in Mirgorod. He was a friend and patron of many Ukrainian writers and artists, in particular Vasily Kapnist, Pavel Koropchevsky, Miklashevsky, Yakov Markevich, Vasily Lomikovsky, Vasily Gogol, Vladimir Borovikovsky, Artemy Vedel. Through his friend Osip Kamenetsky, Troshchinsky was one of the initiators of the first edition of the Aeneid by Ivan Kotlyarevsky (1798). In Kibintsy, Troshchinsky had a home theater, which he directed from 1812 with the help of Vasily Kapnist and Vasily Gogol-Yanovsky.

Troshchinsky collected a rich library, sold in parts after his death in different hands. He died of "dropsy in the chest" on February 26, 1829, in Kibintsy, leaving a very significant condition: 6 thousand souls of serfs, a house in Petersburg and Kiev, movable property worth about 1 million rubles. He bequeathed a significant part of his wealth to his senior nephew Andrei Troshchinsky.

Troshchinsky was not married, but had secondary children – his son Dmitry (October 25, 1802 – ?, born in Saint Petersburg, the godson of Colonel Andrei Troshchinsky), and daughter Nadezhda (she died of consumption in 1817), she was married to an officer, Prince Ivan Khilkov, who soon left, according to Gogol, he was "a big comedian and an old sinner". Their daughter Praskovya Ivanovna (1804–1829) became the wife (1827) of Major General Baron Stanislav Karlovich Osten-Saken (1789–1863).

According to a contemporary, Troshchinsky "loved her granddaughter dearly, meanwhile, she was completely convinced that she was his only heiress and eagerly expected what her fate would be decided. When reading the spiritual, the old man called her a pupil and left her 800 souls in the Kiev province. This news struck her so much that she fell ill, soon gave birth, and died three weeks after the death of Troshchinsky, leaving her husband and little orphan daughter", Elena, who died in 1835, in despair. After her death, Andrei Troshchinsky tried in court to rob the baron of Osten-Saken, but lost the case. In 1837, the side daughters of Prince Khilkov, Countess Alexandra Efimovskaya and Natalya Ushakova, began a lawsuit with the baron, trying to prove that they were the legal heirs of their deceased half-sister Praskovya Khilkova, but in 1851 all their arguments were recognized as having no legal basis.

== Awards ==
- Order of Saint Vladimir, 2nd class (September 22, 1794);
- Order of Saint Anna, 2nd class;
- Order of Saint Alexander Nevsky;
- Order of Saint John of Jerusalem.
