= Aleksandra Laval =

Russian noblewoman (1772 – 1850)

Aleksandra Grigorevna Laval
- Александра Григорьевна Лаваль
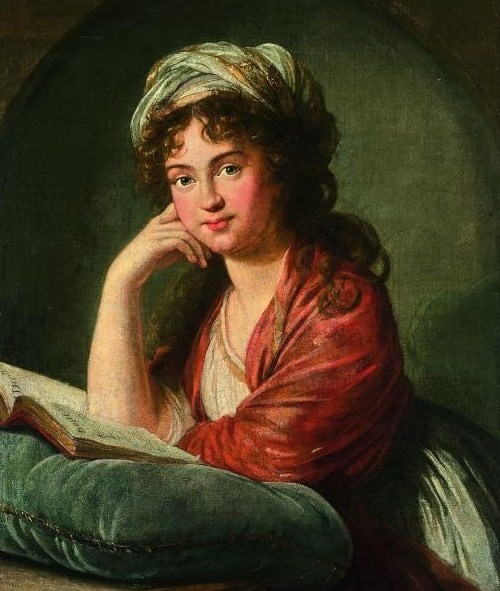
- Portrait by Vigée Le Brun
- Born: Aleksandra Kozitskaya; March 18, 1772; Saint Petersburg, Russian Empire
- Died: November 17, 1850 (aged 78); Saint Petersburg, Russian Empire
- Spouse: Ivan Laval
- Children: Ekaterina Trubetskaya; Sofya Laval; Aleksandra Laval
- Parents: Grigoriy Kozitskiy (father); Ekaterina Kozitskaya (mother)

Countess Aleksandra Grigorevna Laval (née Kozitskaya; March 18, 1772 – November 17, 1850) was one of the heirs of Myasnikov's millions, a salon holder, art collector and philanthropist. Wife of Count Ivan Laval, mother of Ekaterina Trubetskaya, mother–in–law of the Decembrist Prince Trubetskoy.

== Biography ==
The eldest daughter of Ekaterina II's Secretary of State Grigoriy Kozitskiy from his marriage to Ekaterina Myasnikova, the daughter of a famous rich man. She grew up in luxury, in a family that boasted of its wealth. At the age of 26, after the wedding of her younger sister Anna with Prince Aleksandr Beloselskiy, she fell in love with the French emigrant Ivan Laval, an employee of the Ministry of Foreign Affairs. The mother, Ekaterina Ivanovna, although she was herself the poorly educated daughter of an Old Ritualist ferryman on the Volga, according to family legend, opposed such an unequal marriage.

Then Aleksandra, in love, wrote a most submissive request and put it in a special box placed near the emperor's palace. Pavel I wanted to understand the petition and demanded clarification from Ekaterina Ivanovna. She stated that the reason for the refusal was that Laval "is not of our faith, he came from nowhere and has a small rank". The emperor's resolution was brief:

He is a Christian, I know him, and for Kozitskaya the rank is quite sufficient. Get married in half an hour.

Ivan Laval and Aleksandra Kozitskaya were immediately married in the parish church without any preparation. Aleksandra Grigorevna brought her husband a huge dowry, about 20 million, including the Voskresenskiy Plant in Ural. Skillfully using the resulting wealth, in 1814 Ivan Laval was elevated with his descendants to the Dignity of Count of the Kingdom of France, which was recognized for him in the Russian Empire in 1817. The title and successful career finally reconciled Ekaterina Ivanovna with her daughter's choice; in 1833, before her death, she generously gifted the Laval Couple.

While traveling abroad, Aleksandra Grigorevna met many prominent people, including French writers François Chateaubriand and Benjamin Constant, and visited the salon of the writer de Staël, with whom she was considered a friend. According to Baron Modest Korf, Countess Laval introduced and brooded in her family an extraordinary disorder; she herself was:

Small, pockmarked, disgusting, like a Chinese doll and always with bare shoulders and colossal breasts, looking at which you just wanted to spit. To this end, in character, tone and manner, she was the perfect man. Her husband was in no way inferior to her in disgustingness, but in completely different dimensions, this is a kind of skeleton of a small heron with eyes like buns, but seeing nothing, with legs that can, it seems, knock down any breath of wind, and, moreover, with similar character.

Aleksandra Laval died on November 17, 1850. She was buried in the necropolis of the Holy Trinity Aleksandr Nevskiy Lavra.

== Literary and musical salon ==
Aleksandra Laval hosted a literary and musical salon that brought together individuals interested in literature and music.

In the early 1800s, by order of the new owner, the architect Thomas de Thomon rebuilt the mansion on the English Embankment, near the Senat. He decorated the main facade, facing the embankment, with ten Ionic three–quarter columns at the level of the second and third floors. Currently, the mansion is part of the complex of buildings of the Constitutional Court.

Aleksandra Grigorevna enjoyed great respect in high society. It was believed that she inherited from her mother her natural intelligence, common sense, strong character combined with tact, combining all this with an excellent upbringing. Soon her house became one of the cultural centers of Sankt–Peterburg in the first half of the 19th century. Poets, writers, and simply connoisseurs of art gathered at her place, new works were read, and novelties in European literature were discussed.

According to the Lavals' Librarian Charles Saint–Julien, the salon "brought together the most outstanding representatives of poetry and literature; here between 1827 and 1830 I had the opportunity to see Pushkin, Krylov and Zhukovskiy...". Among Aleksandra Laval's guests were Aleksandr Turgenev, Pyotr Vyazemskiy, Nikolay Gnedich, Aleksey Olenin, Aleksey Pleshcheev, Ivan Kozlov, and many others. Sometimes up to 600 people gathered in the Laval's Salon, sometimes Emperor Aleksandr I was there too.

On March 10, 1816, Nikolay Karamzin read unpublished chapters of the "History of the Russian State" here, hoping that an influential high–society salon would provide sufficient support from people close to the court, which would help in obtaining permission to publish the book. Aleksandr Pushkin also read his unpublished works in the house on the English Embankment. Here, in 1819, he first read the ode "Liberty", and on May 16, 1828, in the presence of Aleksandr Griboedov and Adam Mitskevich, the tragedy "Boris Godunov". Mikhail Lermontov also attended Laval's Receptions, and here on February 16, 1840, he had a quarrel with the son of the French ambassador, Barant, which ended in a duel.

In the 1840s, at evenings in the presence of almost the entire high society of Sankt–Peterburg, Rubini, Caradori, Viardot–García, and Tamburini sang.

Similar receptions took place not only on the English Embankment, but also at the Lavals' Dacha on Aptekarskiy Island, at the confluence of the Malaya Nevka and the Karpovka River. The plot was given to the couple by Emperor Pavel I as a wedding gift. Prince Pyotr Vyazemskiy called conversations at dacha receptions "the living newspaper of Peterburg", and in the draft of Pushkin's Story "Guests Arrived at the Dacha" (1828), one of the scenes took place at Lavals' Dacha.

In 1825, after the Decembrist Uprising, the mansion on the English Embankment was subjected to a thorough search, since Lavals' eldest daughter Ekaterina was married to Colonel Sergey Trubetskoy, one of the leaders of the Northern Society. However, this did not reduce the popularity of Aleksandra Grigorevna's salon.

== Literature ==
Aleksandra Grigorevna took part in the publication of the newspaper "The Ferret" (French: Le Furet), which was published from June 30, 1829, by her husband's librarian secretary, the French writer Charles de Saint–Julien. The newspaper was published in French and was intended for an aristocratic audience; it contained news of modern French and later Russian literature, reviews of performances by French and Italian troupes, reviews of the works of Russian writers and poets, including reviews of the works of Pushkin.

== Charity ==
Aleksandra Grigorevna was also actively involved in charity work. On June 4, 1838, on the Peterburg Side, she established an orphanage, the third in Sankt–Peterburg, for visiting children of both sexes. By the highest order of Empress Aleksandra Fyodorovna (wife of Nikolay I), the shelter was named Lavalskiy. At first the shelter was located in a rented house, but since 1840 the shelter was transferred to a house specially purchased with funds from Aleksandra Grigorevna. And until the death of its benefactress, the shelter was maintained at her expense. After 1850, the shelter was maintained at the expense of her daughters, grandchildren, voluntary donations and wills. The shelter existed until 1918.

At the expense of Aleksandra Grigorevna, the church of the unmercenary saints Cosmas and Damian was built in the village of Bolshoy Vyas (now Luninskiy District of the Penza Oblast) and the church in honor of the Kazan Icon of the Mother of God in the village of Urusovo (now Rtishchevskiy District of the Saratov Oblast).

== Collections ==
Through the efforts of the countess, a unique art collection of paintings and ancient sculptures, collected during her trips to Europe, especially in Italy, appeared in the house on the English Embankment. On the walls of her house there were canvases that the hostess passed off as works by Rubens, Rembrandt, Ruisdael, Lorrain, Albani, Bartolomeo and other artists. In the halls there were up to 300 ancient Greek and Italian vases, including "Dionysus Fighting a Giant", "Farewell of a Warrior to His Family", "Feast Scene", clay and glass items and about 300 antique bronze objects. Roman copies of the 1st–2nd centuries CE from Greek originals of the 5th–4th centuries BCE were of great interest; Proto–Corinthian aryballes occupied a special place, among them even a rare example from the 8th century BCE. There were about 30 pieces of art from Egypt dating back to the 2nd millennium BCE, including: "The Sacred Falcon", "The King's Head", "The Kneeling Priest".

The marble floor in the house was taken from the palace of the Roman Emperor Tiberius on the island of Capri.

There was a rich library of five thousand volumes with bookplates by the engraver Nikolay Utkin with books on history, philosophy, economics, art, and geography.

Many exhibits from the Lavals' Collection were shown at various exhibitions. After the death of Aleksandra Grigorevna, the collection of paintings and the library were divided between her heirs, and the most valuable part of the collection of ancient Egyptian and ancient works was transferred to the Ermitazh, where it is still stored.

Gallery

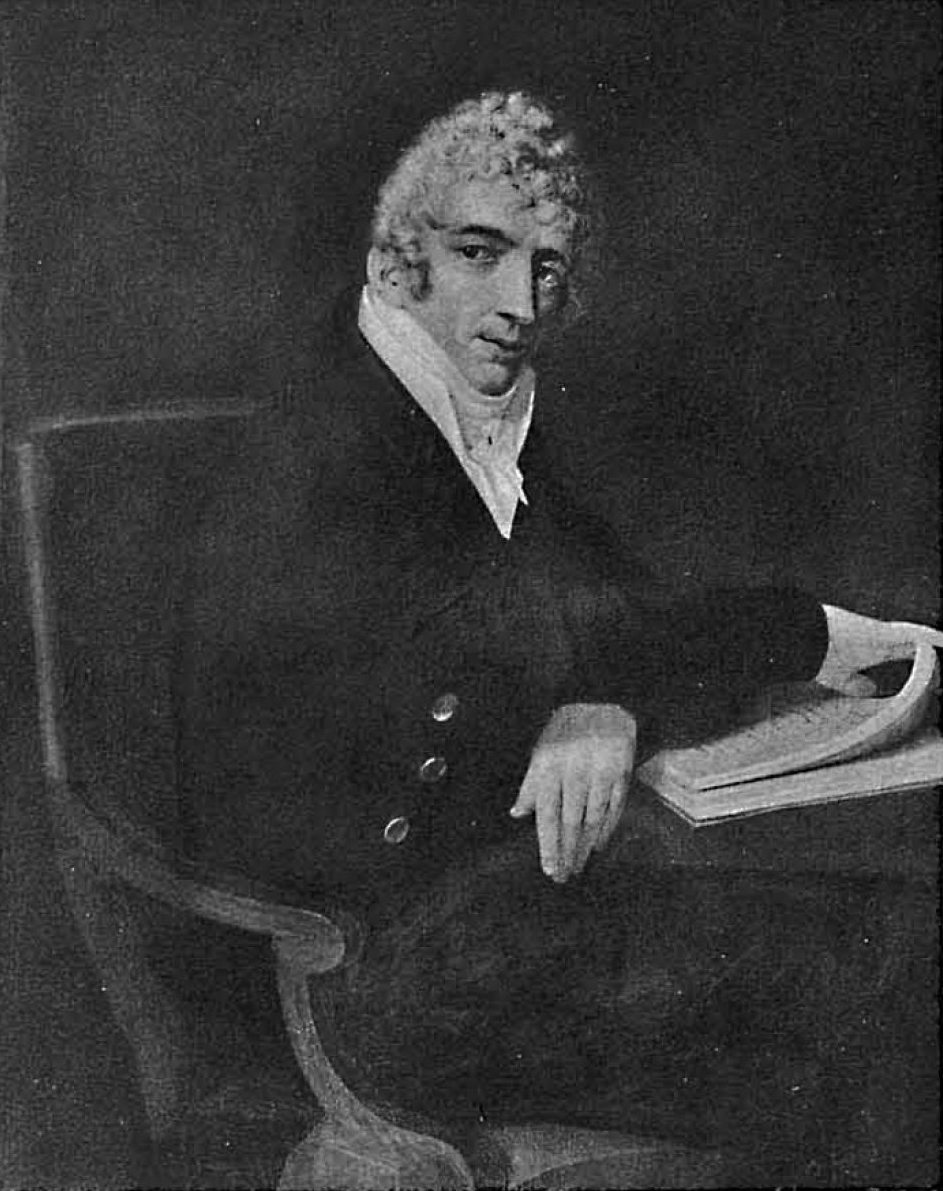
Ivan Laval

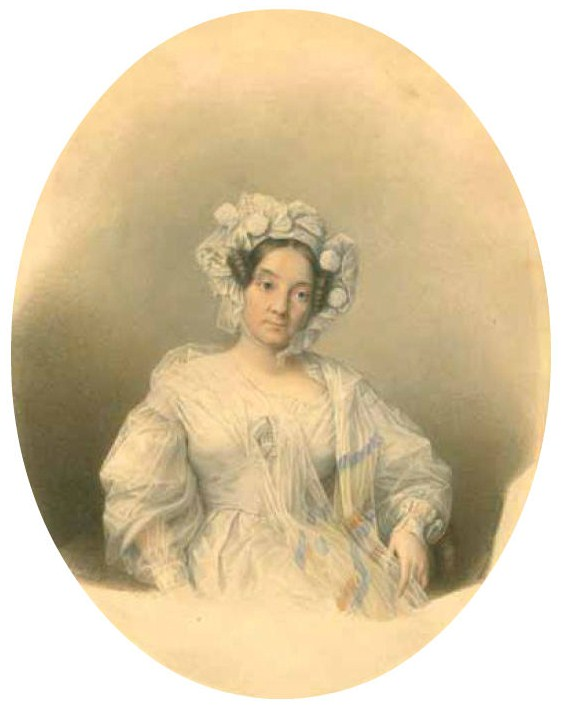
Aleksandra Laval (1851)

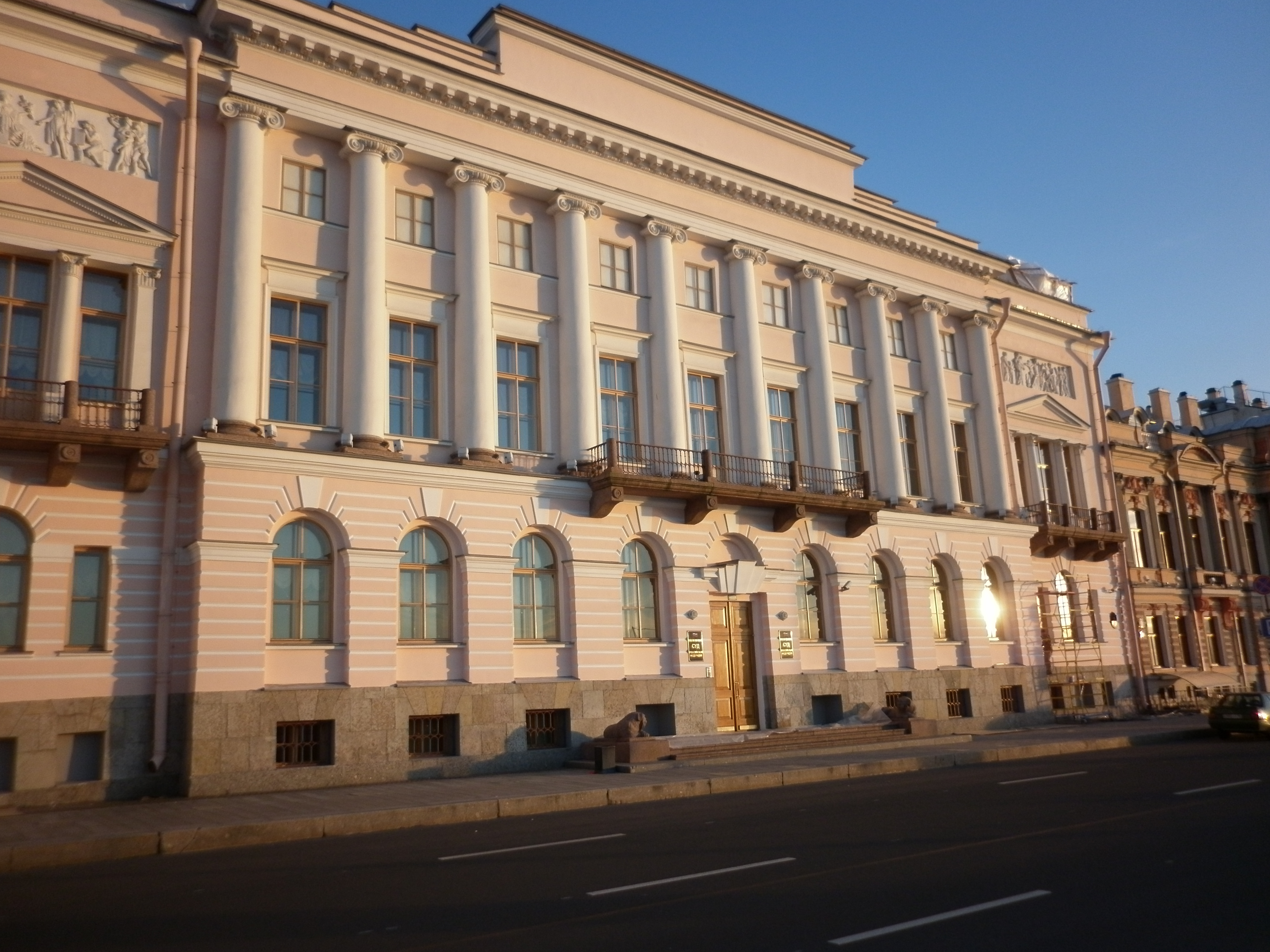
Lavals' Mansion. Cultural Heritage Site No. 7810007000

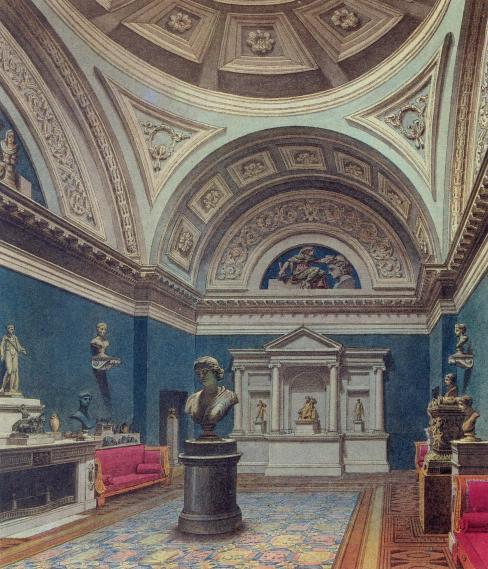
Exhibition Hall of the House of Countess Laval. Watercolor by Maksim Vorobyov. 1819

== Family ==
From her marriage to Ivan Laval, Aleksandra Laval had two sons and four daughters:

- Ekaterina Ivanovna (1800–1854), was married to the Decembrist Prince Sergey Trubetskoy, and was the first to follow her exiled husband to Sibir;
- Zinaida Ivanovna (1801–1873), from 1823 she was married to Major General and diplomat Ludwig Lebzeltern (1774–1854);
- Vladimir Ivanovich (February 2, 1804 – April 21, 1825), cornet of the Horse Guards, shot himself, according to one version, after losing at cards, according to another, as a result of an accident;
- Pavel Ivanovich (1806 – April 1, 1812), died of fever, was buried in the Aleksandr Nevskiy Lavra;
- Sofiya Ivanovna (1809–1871), maid of honor, was married from 1833 to Count Aleksandr Borkh (1804–1867), diplomat and chamberlain. Sofiya Ivanovna was involved in charity work, and since 1834 she was a member of the council of the Patriotic Ladies' Society. Ivan Kozlov's poem "The Broken Ship" (1832) is dedicated to her. After the death of her mother, she inherited a mansion on the English Embankment;
- Aleksandra Ivanovna (October 8, 1811 – 1886), baptized on October 22, 1811, in Isaac's Cathedral under the reception of her grandmother Ekaterina Kozitskaya; was married (from August 23, 1829) to Count Stanislav Korwin–Kossakowski (1795–1872), writer, artist, master of ceremonies, and envoy to the Madrid Court.
Daughters

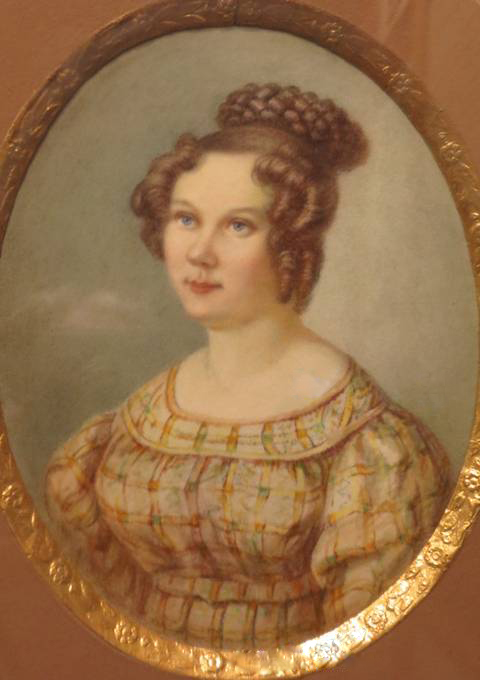
Ekaterina Ivanovna

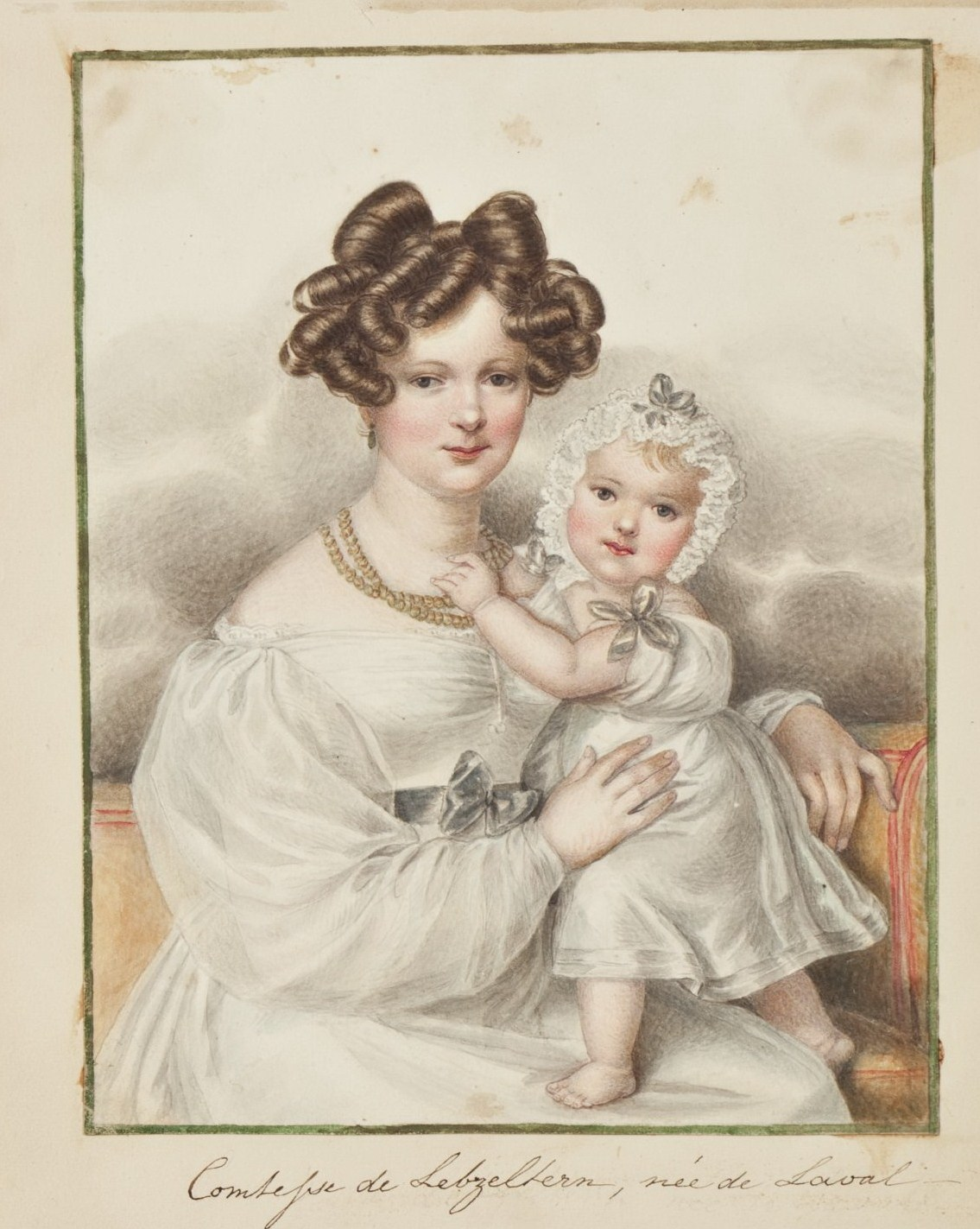
Zinaida Ivanovna

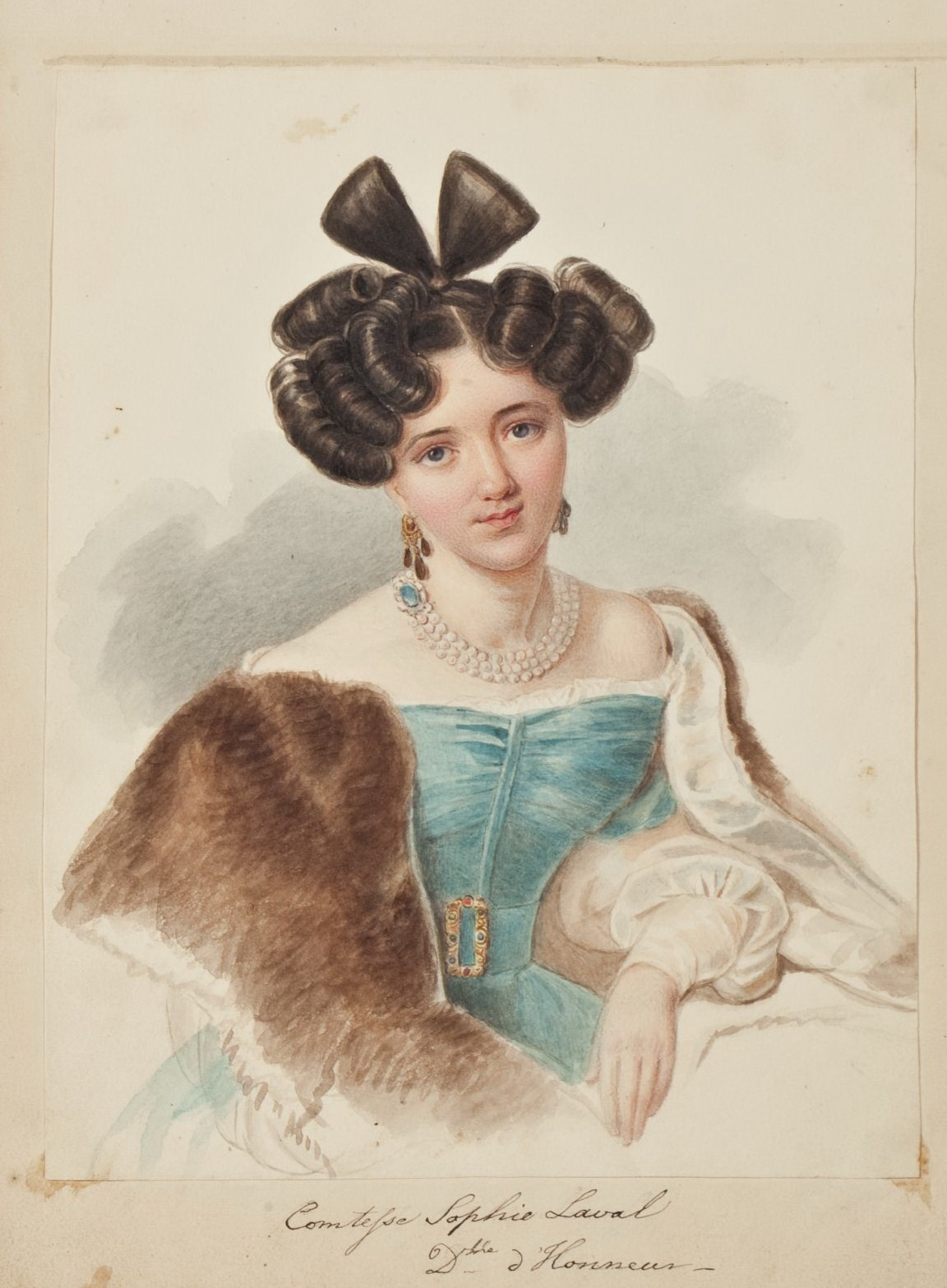
Sofiya Ivanovna

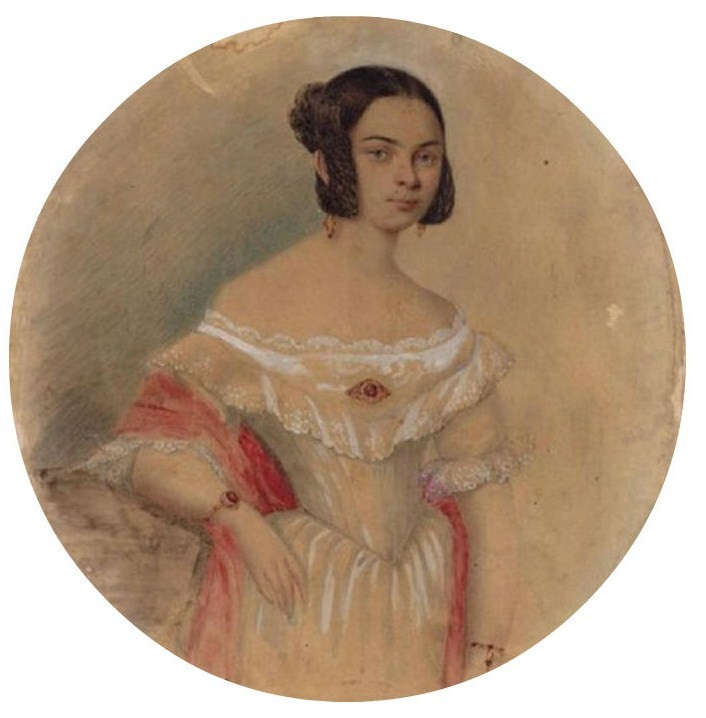
Aleksandra Ivanovna

== Image in cinema ==
- "The Star of Captivating Happiness" – actress Tatyana Okunevskaya.

== Sources ==
- Vaynshteyn A. L., Valentina Pavlova. On the History of Pushkin's Story "Guests Arrived at the Dacha..."
- The First Story: About Space In Time // Quarterly Overseer, Special Thematic Pages of the Sankt–Peterburg Magazine. Sobaka.Ru – March 2009 – No. 3
- In the West of Aptekarskiy Island // Quarterly Overseer, Special Thematic Pages of the Sankt–Peterburg Magazine. Sobaka.Ru – July 2004 – No. 19
