= Adam Olsufiev =

Russian arts patron and senator (1721–1784)

Adam Vasilyevich Olsufiev
- Адам Васильевич Олсуфьев
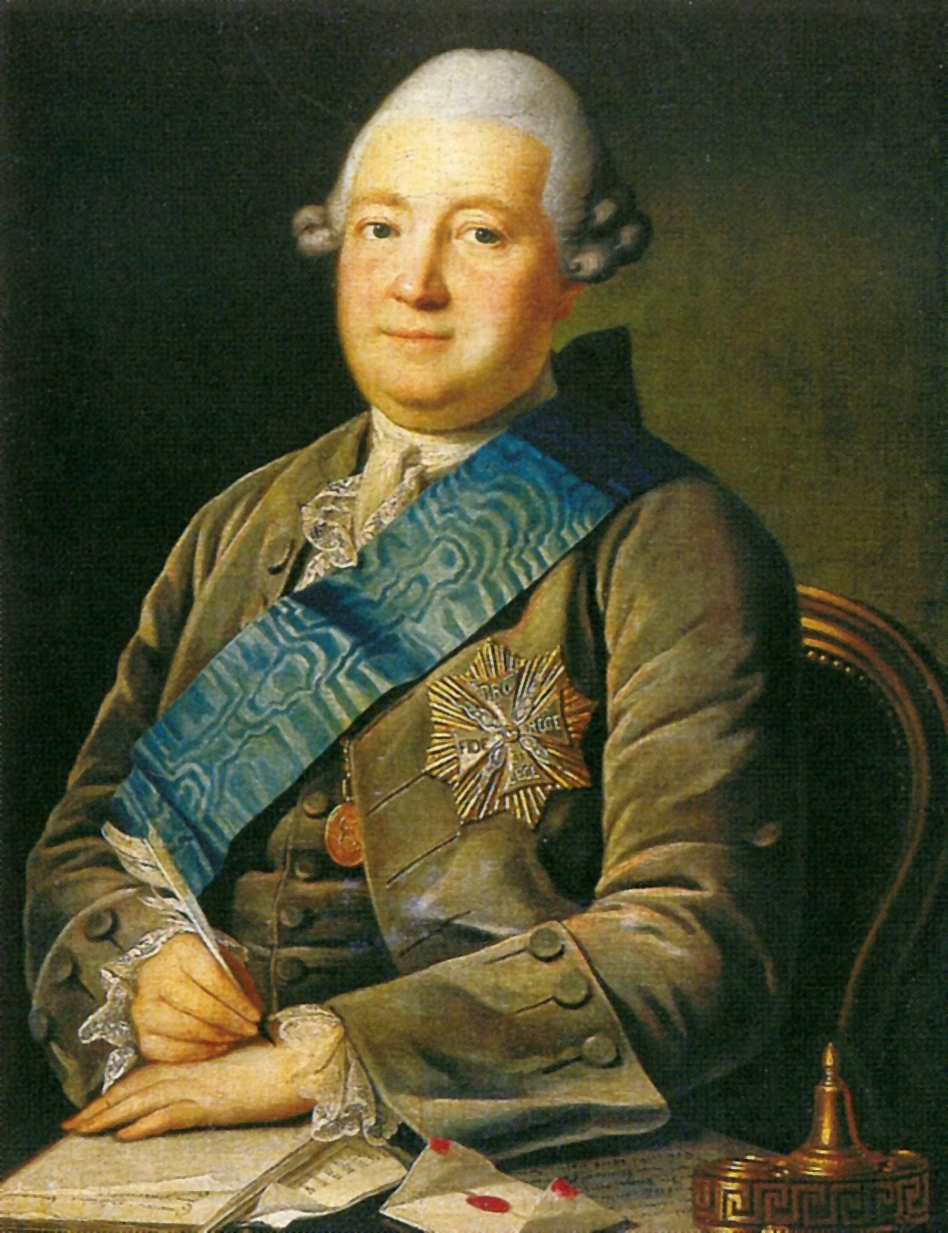
- Portrait by Christinek, 1773

State Secretary
- Monarch: Catherine II

Personal details
- Born: January 27, 1721 Saint Petersburg, Russian State
- Died: July 8, 1784 (aged 63) Saint Petersburg, Russian Empire
- Resting place: Lazarevskoe Cemetery of the Alexander Nevsky Lavra
- Spouse(s): Sophia Amalia Tuxen; Maria Vasilyevna Saltykova
- Relations: Olsufievs
- Children: Sophia, Sergey, Maria, Natalya, Alexey, Vladimir, Dmitry
- Education: Noble Cadet Corps
- Awards: Order of Saint Alexander Nevsky; Order of the White Eagle

Military service
- Allegiance: Russian Empire
- Branch/service: Army
- Rank: Lieutenant
- Battles/wars: Russian–Turkish War

Adam Vasilyevich Olsufiev (January 27, 1721 – July 8, 1784) was a figure in the Russian Enlightenment, a lover of literature, the patron of opera and theaters, Cabinet Minister and State Secretary of Empress Catherine II. He ended his career as a senator with the rank of Actual Privy Councilor. Grandfather of Count Vasily Olsufiev.

== Biography ==
Came from the Olsufievs. The son of Ober-Hofmeister Vasily Dmitrievich and his wife Eva Ivanovna, née Golender, who was Swedish by birth. At baptism, he received the name Vasily, but at the behest of Emperor Peter I, who wished to be godfather, but who was late to his baptism, was named by a name uncommon among the Russians, Adam. Therefore, Adam Vasily had two names, but on all acts and documents he was signed by Adam.

At the age of seven, he lost his father and remained in the arms of his mother, who soon after the death of her husband remarried Colonel Wenzel. Wenzel took up his education and on February 17, 1732, identified him in the then-newly opened Gentry Cadet Corps. Here Adam Vasilyevich spent seven years, and managed to attract attention with his remarkable talents and ability to languages; therefore, when the War with Turkey began in 1735 and Field Marshal Count Minikh turned to the Corps with a request to give him a young man who knows languages, the choice of superiors immediately fell on young Olsufiev. He was released from the Corps with the promotion from corporal to commissioner on assignments in the army Carabinier Regiment and was appointed to be a member of Minikh circle to conduct his foreign correspondence.

At the end of hostilities, during which he was inseparably at the field marshal, Olsufiev joined the diplomatic service and was appointed secretary of the Russian embassy in Copenhagen under envoy Baron Johann Korf. Olsufiev's overseas stay was very long; he became so settled in Denmark that he married a Danish woman, who, however, soon died, leaving him no offspring. Returning to Russia and soon marrying Maria Vasilyevna Saltykova, Olsufyev expelled from the Copenhagen mission and entered the service in the Collegium of Foreign Affairs to Chancellor Bestuzhev.

Through the relatives of his wife, in particular through her brother, Sergei Saltykov, who enjoyed the location of Grand Duchess Catherine Alexeyevna, Adam Vasilyevich became known to the young Grand Duchess and soon rose into the ranks of her adherents still rare then; he helped the Grand Duchess correspond with her mother, relations with which she was forbidden, and earned her favor with his cheerful, accommodating character, wit and wide education. In November 1756, Olsufiev was promoted to state councilor and then made a member of the reorganized by him and Pugovishnikov in 1758, on behalf of Chancellor Vorontsov, the Foreign College, as well as personal secretary of Empress Elizabeth Petrovna.

Since that time, he began to quickly move up the ranks, and, on the recommendation of the cabinet minister, Baron Cherkasov, who had asked the Empress for retirement in old age, began to carry out his duties, managing the Empress's personal income and Siberian gold and silver mines, and after death the baron took his place, becoming the cabinet minister. When Chancellor Bestuzhev was disgraced, Adam Vasilievich, as cabinet minister, drafted a manifesto on his dismissal. The position of Olsufiev, as a person close to the empress, was at that time very ticklish among the three warring camps, that is, the empress herself, the heir to the throne and the young grand duchess. It was necessary to have a lot of tact and dexterity, so as not to annoy one or the other side, and he succeeded completely. He did not lose the empress's confidence until the last days of her life and, being at the bedside of the dying empress, had the opportunity to once again make sure of her great disposition to him; the empress alone left him at her bed, making death orders to the heir and in his presence expressed to the Grand Duke her last will. At that time, Adam Vasilievich was already a Privy Councilor and Knight of the Order of Alexander Nevsky.

He has a cheerful disposition, a pleasant and very subtle mind, an open, sociable look; it can easily be mistaken for a man who loves pleasure, since he really loves dinners, society, music (which he knows perfectly), theater and everything that applies to him, but even more he is a business person... He is so skillful, so educated, and even so necessary, in addition, he has so many charming courtesies and qualities for society and amusements that he is likely to find a way to please their highnesses.

— French diplomat Favier

Under the new reign, he remained in all his posts and ranks and invariably maintained the gracious attitude of Emperor Peter III to himself. Upon the accession of Catherine II, Olsufiev received the Empress's private office in management. Appointed on July 8, 1762, along with Teplov and Elagin, the State Secretary to the empress, he was introduced into a circle of affairs of a very diverse nature. The Empress's money affairs, secret instructions to the governors and participation in a number of large public and private affairs of the Empress – this is his circle of activity. Very pleased with his ordering, the empress appreciated the work of Olsufiev, and in January 1763 appointed him senator to the 1st Department of the Senate. In the same year, he was involved in active participation in the negotiations on a trade agreement with England, and managed by his attitude, knowledge and experience to gain a very flattering characterization of the British ambassador, who in his reports to his court stated that "he considers Olsufiev according to his abilities and education above all Russians with whom he dealt". On March 20, 1764, Olsufiev resigned from the duties of accepting petitions submitted to the Highest Name, but retained all his other posts and continued to be among the closest persons to the empress.

After the promulgation of the famous Nakaz, Olsufiev was elected as a deputy to the Commission on Cities, acted as an ardent defender of noble interests, acting in this regard along with historian Prince Mikhail Shcherbatov. On January 8, 1769, he was elected among nine people to the Directorate Commission. In the rank of senator, Olsufiev often took part in many major affairs. Having begun his Senate practice in 1765 with the first report on the need to leave workers unnecessary at salt factories, Olsufyev in 1766 came up with a project on the collection, from 1767, of all Roma living in the Slobodsko-Ukrainian and other provinces, a tax of seven hryvnias. Distracted by other studies from senatorial duties, Olsufiev, appointed December 6, 1767, to attend the 1st Department, although he continued to participate in Senate meetings, did not make major reports, and only in 1776, after a long break, in a thorough report The Senate outlined the unlawful actions of the Tobolsk Provincial Chancellery, which placed at the state-owned factories yasak Tatars, Ostyaks and other foreigners, without any right, and carried out other lawlessness. Having examined this question on the spot, Olsufyev on February 16, 1782, in a detailed report to the Senate, revealed the abuses of levying taxes on peasants assigned to the Kolyvano-Voskresensky salt mines and Barnaul mines, pointing out the absence of free ration workers, due to which many mines were closed. In addition, Olsufiev spoke several times in the Senate with reports on unrest and careless conduct of business at the Justice College. However, disagreements and even clashes with some senior administrative officials (incidentally, with the prosecutor general, Prince Vyazemsky) led the unyielding Olsufiev to ask the empress to dismiss him from being in the Senate.

In 1782, disorders and abuses were revealed in the affairs of the Imperial Theaters; these theaters chronically began to give a deficit to the government, which finally decided to establish a committee to regulate the administrative and financial aspects of theater management, while paying attention to the situation of artists. The Empress appointed Adam Vasilyevich at the head of this Committee, appointing him chairman on July 12, 1783. His duties and competencies were carefully set out in 44 paragraphs found in the reprint of the Empress to Olsufiev. Death, however, prevented Olsufiev from completing the work entrusted to him; he died of dropsy.

Contemporaries agree on the characterization of Adam Vasilyevich, portraying him as a very intelligent, sociable person who did not take an active part in the struggle of temporary workers and therefore did not inspire a hostile attitude towards himself. Johann Bernoulli certifies him as "a man of outstanding abilities, not only knowing different languages, but even dialects and dialects thereof in great perfection". Several times recalls Olsufiev on the pages of his notes by Casanova:

The minister of the royal court, Olsufiev, invited me to dine at the Lokatelli restaurant in Yekaterinhof. It was an imperial suburb, which the queen granted to the former stage director. He was amazed to see me, and I was no less amazed to learn that he had shut himself down as a restaurateur. Every day he gave excellent dinners to everyone who was able to pay a ruble for them, not counting wine. <...> He is an ardent admirer of Venus and Bacchus and the only one between Russian bars who, to become a writer, did not need to read Voltaire. He studied at Uppsala University and without the slightest claim tested his strength in all kinds of literature.

== Literary activity ==
Loving a quiet, relaxed life, with a cheerful character and great wit, Olsufiev devoted his leisure time to music, theater, literature, but sometimes he was not averse to taking part in the noisy life of Catherine's nobles. Fluent in French, German, English, Italian, Swedish and Danish, Olsufiev was well acquainted with foreign literature and wrote satirical original works himself, and also translated a lot of foreign authors, however, he printed very little. The Italian operas he translated were played at the court of Empress Elizabeth Petrovna, and the German comedy Six Dishes, which Empress Catherine really liked, was redone by Olsufev for the Russian scene at her request and played at court. This play was then published.

Italian operas are known from his translations: Eudokia the Crowned or Theodosius II of 1751, Seleucus of 1744, Mithridates of 1747, Bellerophon, printed in Saint Petersburg. In addition, he translated most of the comedies of the poet Boneka. The literary activities of Adam Vasilyevich, without bearing the seal of great talent, were soon forgotten, but his wide education, acquaintance with literature, languages, love of art and his own works in connection with his high social position gave Olsufyev pride of place in the Free Economic Society, Academy of Sciences and Academy of Arts. The first steps in the activities of this scientific society are inextricably linked with the name of Olsufiev: he was elected to the first presidents of the Society even before the approval of the charter and remained with him until January 1, 1766; in addition, he was elected two more times: in 1769 and 1773.

He was an honorary member of the Academy of Arts (from September 21, 1765) and a member of the Russian Academy of Sciences (from October 21, 1788), in the vocabulary of which he promised to take part, reporting "different root words from foreign languages".

In 1784, at the special request of Catherine II, Olsufiev published in Saint Petersburg the third part of Vasily Tatishchev's History of Russia, based on the Nikon Chronicle and bringing the story to 1462.

After the death of Olsufiev, a rich collection of paintings and engravings remained, which died in the Moscow Fire of 1812; only the collection of Russian portraits and Russian folk pictures has survived – the one of a kind collection that Olsufiev has been compiling since 1766.

Catherine II's Letters to Olsufiev were published in the 19th century.

== Family and children ==
The first wife (from 1741) was the Danish aristocrat Sophia Amalia Tuxen (1723–1751).

The second wife (from February 6, 1752) was Maria Vasilyevna Saltykova (1728–1792), the maid of honor of the court (12/09/1752), the daughter of Vasily Saltykov, who assisted Empress Elizaveta Petrovna on her accession to the throne, from his second marriage with Princess Maria Alekseevna Golitsyna. As a dowry, the village of Ershovo was given after it. 4 sons and 3 daughters were born in the marriage.

- Sofya Adamovna (1753–1786), was the first wife of Lieutenant Colonel Mikhail Petrovich Devier, grandson of Anton Devier;
- Sergei Adamovich (1755–1818), from 1769 he studied at the University of Leipzig, Major General; since 1780 he was married to maid of honor Ekaterina Ivanovna Molchanova (1758–1809), one of the best graduates of the Smolny Institute;
- Maria Adamovna (1757–1820), from 1777 she was married to her cousin, mother, stalmaster Prince Nikolai Golitsyn (1751–1809). This marriage was one of the first marriages allowed in Russia between relatives, a precedent for the marriage of Prince Grigory Orlov and his cousin, Zinovieva;
- Natalya Adamovna (April 15, 1758 – 1826), the goddaughter of Prince Alexei Golitsyn and the aunt of Princess Anna Gagarina; was married to Grigory Kondoidi;
- Alexei Adamovich (January 5, 1764 – 1838), the godson of Count Alexander Buturlin;
- Vladimir Adamovich;
- Dmitry Adamovich (1769–1808), served by election as the Moscow provincial leader of the nobility, had the rank of Current State Adviser and the Order of Saint Vladimir of the 3rd Сlass. He was married to Daria Alexandrovna Delitsyna (1761–1828), the illegitimate daughter of Vice–Chancellor Prince Alexander Golitsyn and the Hungarian Countess Klupfel, their son Count Vasily Olsufiev.
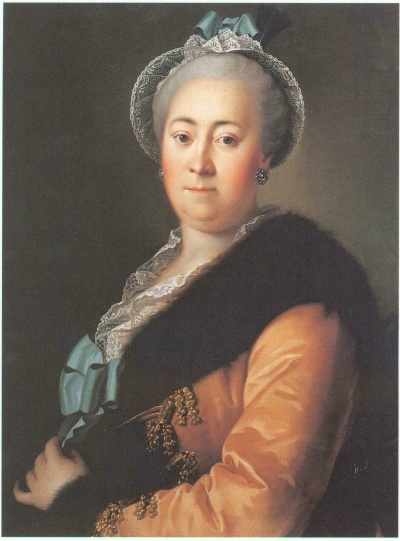
Maria Vasilievna,
wife

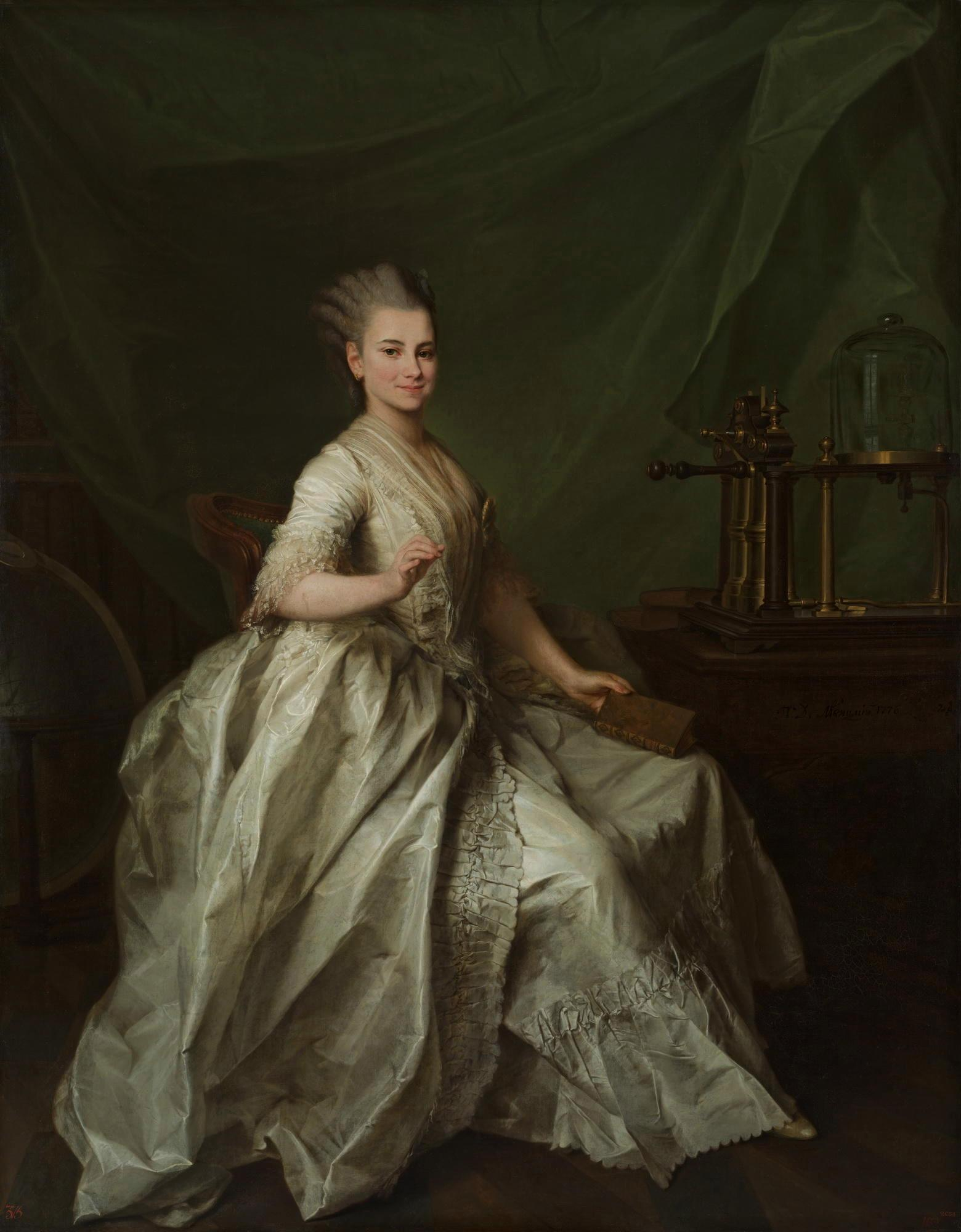
Ekaterina Ivanovna,
daughter-in-law

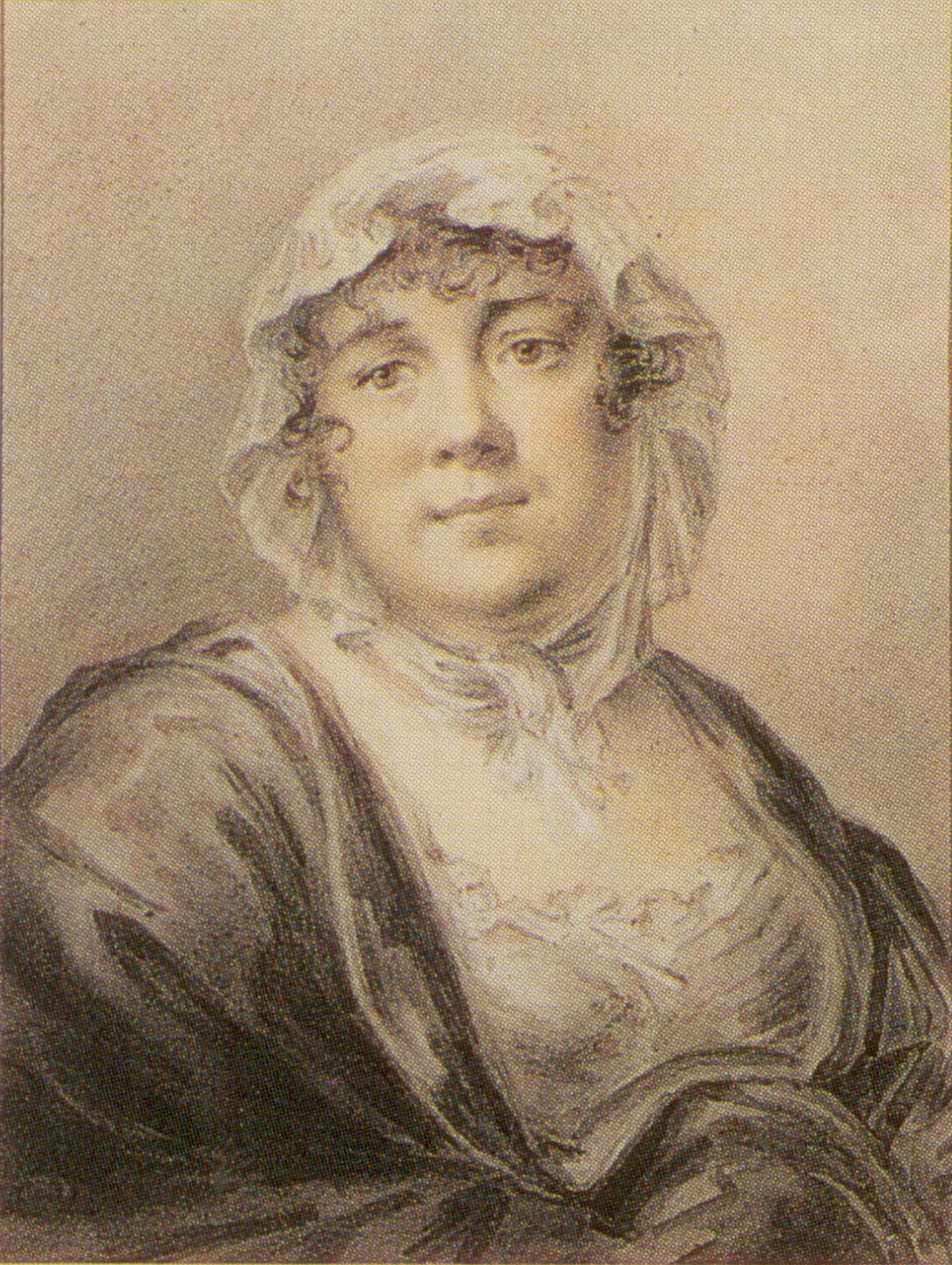
Maria Adamovna,
daughter

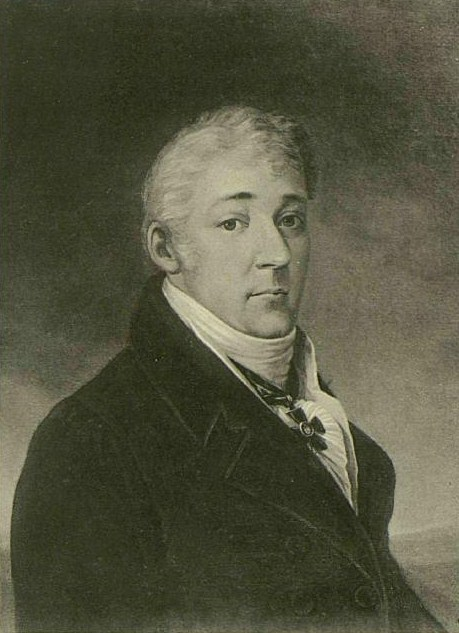
Dmitry Adamovich,
son

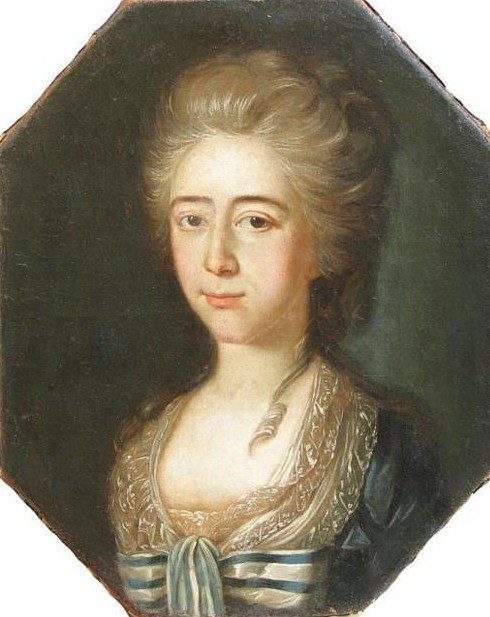
Daria Alexandrovna,
daughter-in-law

== Sources ==
- Olsufiev, Adam Vasilievich // Russian Biographical Dictionary: In 25 Volumes – Saint Petersburg – Moscow, 1896–1918
