= Alexey Vasilyevich Makarov =

Russian statesman and diplomat (1674–1740)

- Алексей Васильевич Макаров
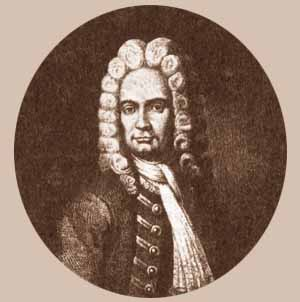
- Born: 1674; Vologda, Tsardom of Russia
- Died: 1740 (aged 65–66); Glebovskoe, Yaroslavl Province, Russian Empire
- Spouses: Feodosiya Ivanovna Topilskaya; Anastasia Ivanovna Odoevskaya
- Children: Peter; Anna; Elizabeth

Alexey Vasilyevich Makarov (1674–1740) was a Russian statesman and diplomat who served as the secret cabinet secretary of Peter the Great, who was in charge of the emperor's secret papers. In 1726 and 1727 he was the de facto ruler of Russia. After the death of Catherine I was president of the Collegium of State Income. Under Empress Anna, he was put under house arrest and died 6 years later.

== Biography ==
The son of a clerk in the Vologda Voivodship Office (mandative hut). According to some information, Peter I took him to his service in 1693; according to other sources, he began his service in the Izhora office of Alexander Menshikov as Clerk of the Sovereign's Court, and as personal secretary to Peter I.

Due to his proximity to Peter I, he had a very large influence, which contemporaries had to reckon with, starting with the members of the royal house and ending with foreign diplomats. Accompanied everywhere by the king, was with Peter the Great abroad. Makarov became a very wealthy man, the owner of vast lands with serfs.

Since 1710, Makarov has been called the "court secretary", since 1713 — the cabinet secretary of the emperor. Makarov was in charge of the property of the king, financing the Northern War. After the signing of the Treaty of Nystad, the Cabinet of His Imperial Majesty dealt mainly with issues of peacetime. Makarov read the messages to the tsar and often resolved some issues himself.

Makarov also led the construction of imperial palaces in St. Petersburg and its environs and their decoration. The first Russian zoo — the zoo of the Summer Garden — was also created with the help of the Cabinet. Makarov was also in charge of Kunstkamera, generously paying money to those who delivered various rarities and freaks to the museum.

Cabinet secretary monitored the health of the royal family, the establishment and development of resorts in Russia. The first of them was created in Karelia near Petrovskaya Sloboda, then a healing spring was opened in the capital.

Sending volunteers to study in Europe was also run by Alexey Makarov. He was engaged in hiring foreign specialists, architects, artists, engineers, sculptors, doctors, military men to the Russian service.

After the end of the war with Sweden, Peter ordered Makarov to write its history. He personally edited the text "The History of the Swedish War" written by Makarov and Cherkasov. Thus, the cabinet secretary of Peter I can be considered one of the first Russian historians.

More than everyone contributed to the enthronement of Catherine I; from May 30, 1722 — secret cabinet-secretary, from November 24, 1725 — Major General, from November 24, 1726 — secret counselor.

Under Catherine I, Makarov acquired an unprecedented influence. Often, he replaced the empress at meetings of the "supremes". Even the all-powerful Alexander Menshikov had to reckon with him. Makarov at that time had essentially unlimited power, which caused irritation of Menshikov, who also claimed to be the second person in the state. After the death of Catherine, the Cabinet was immediately abolished, and Makarov's career rapidly went to the bottom. He became president of the Collegium of State Income with a large salary, but his powers were severely curtailed, and he had to move to Moscow, to a new duty station.

Under Peter II, he had to look for "mercifulists" and found them in the person of House of Dolgorukov, thanks to whom he became the president of the Collegium of State Income. In 1731 he adopted the regulations, according to which landlords were obliged to collect arrears from their serfs. In 1732, one of the relatives who had quarreled with him about the inheritance that had been opened was accused of taking bribes and concealing secret papers. A special commission that carried out the investigation of this denunciation in 1732—1734 recognized the charge as not proven.

In connection with the case of the monks of the Sarov desert on November 29, 1734, he was placed under house arrest in Moscow. He died in custody in 1740, and was buried in his estate at Glebovskoye.

== Marriage and children ==
Alexey Makarov was married first to Theodosia Ivanovna Topilskaya. Children from marriage:

- Peter;
- Anna — the wife of State Counselor Andrey Ivanovich Kartashov;
- Elizabeth — the wife of Mikhail Volkonsky.

The second marriage was with Princess Anastasia Ivanovna Odoyevskaya. Child from marriage:

- daughter (died 1733).
