= Grigory Kozitsky =

Russian writer and journalist

Grigory Vasilyevich Kozitsky
- Григорий Васильевич Козицкий
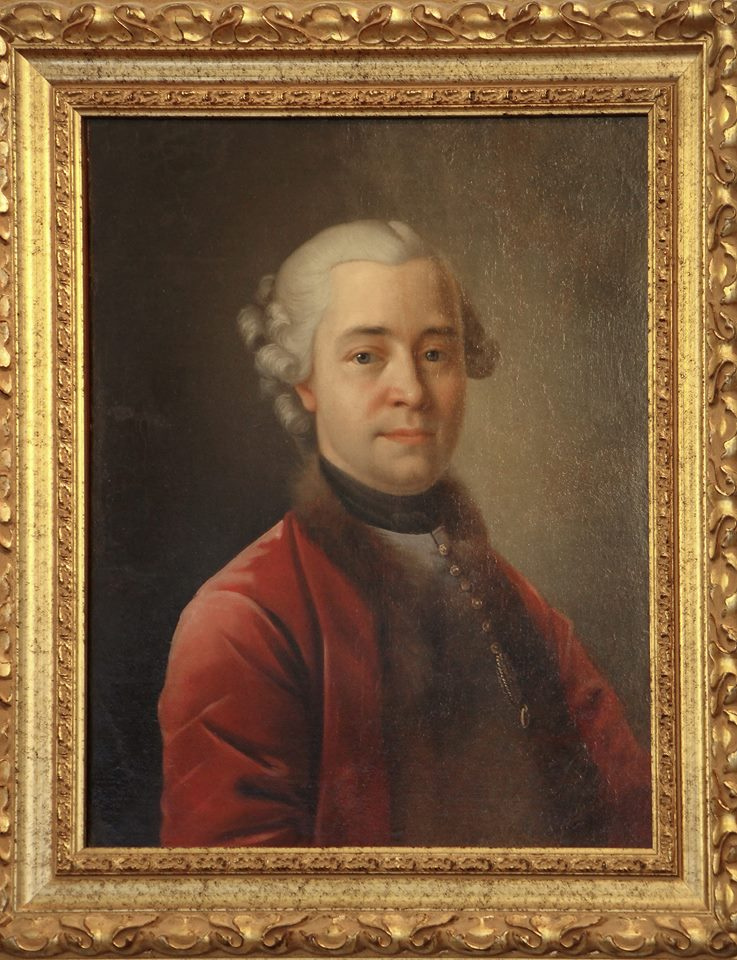

Personal details
- Born: 1724 Kiev
- Died: January 6, 1776 (aged 51–52) Moscow, Russian Empire
- Spouse: Ekaterina Myasnikova
- Children: Aleksandra, Anna
- Education: Kiev–Mogila Academy
- Occupation: Secretary of State, prose writer, journalist

Grigory Vasilyevich Kozitsky (1724, Kiev – January 6, 1776, Moscow) was a Russian writer and journalist of Ukrainian origin, Cabinet Secretary of Catherine II (1768–1774), who helped her in the publication of the magazine Vsyakaya vsyachina.

== Biography ==
Originally from Ukraine, from Little Russian landless nobles of Cossack–senior origin, he studied at the Kiev–Mogila Academy, then in Germany. In 1756, he arrived in the capital of the Russian Empire, the city of Saint Petersburg, where he worked under the guidance of Mikhail Lomonosov, taught at the Academic Gymnasium. After the death of Lomonosov, he analyzed his papers, translated some of them into Latin. Published in the magazines "Monthly Essays", "Hard–Working Bee", "All Sorts of Things".

In 1765, he was close to the court and became Catherine the Great's technical assistant, and then assumed the position of her secretary of state. Two years later, he accompanies the empress, along with Count Vladimir Orlov, on a journey along the Volga.

In 1773, along with Nikolai Motonis, he acted as the scientific editor of the book "Brief Geographical, Political and Historical News About Little Russia" by Vasily Ruban.

In September 1774, Kozitsky, referring to his failing health, asked to be dismissed from the service; on July 10, 1775, he received his resignation and moved to Moscow.

In extensive biographical literature, Kozitsky's death is described basically in the same way: "having fallen into melancholy, he was in a fit of this illness" on December 21, 1775, inflicted 32 wounds on himself with a knife, from which he died on December 26, 1775. References to the sources of such a description, if any, come down to Lieutenant Vasiliev's diary for 1774–1777, which, in turn, states that Kozitsky committed suicide on December 26. Regarding the method of suicide, the available sources of the era refer only to rumors.

== Family ==
In Simbirsk in 1767, he met the daughter of a wealthy merchant and industrialist Ivan Myasnikov, and in 1771, he married Ekaterina Myasnikova (1746–1833). The marriage was approved by the empress, who granted Kozitsky 10,000 rubles on the occasion of the wedding; for his wife, in addition to money, he received 2 factories and 19,000 souls of serfs as a dowry. Their daughters:

- Alexandra Grigorievna (1772–1850), mistress of a brilliant salon, wife of Count Ivan Laval, mother of Ekaterina Trubetskaya, heroine of the poem "Russian Women";
- Anna Grigorievna (1773–1846), second wife of Prince Alexander Beloselsky, stepmother of the famous Princess Zinaida Volkonskaya and mother of Prince Esper Beloselsky–Belozersky.

Following the example of other large landowners, Mistress Kozitskaya arranged the Lyalovo Estate near Moscow with the Church of the Nativity of the Virgin, which served as a burial place for the family of her youngest daughter.

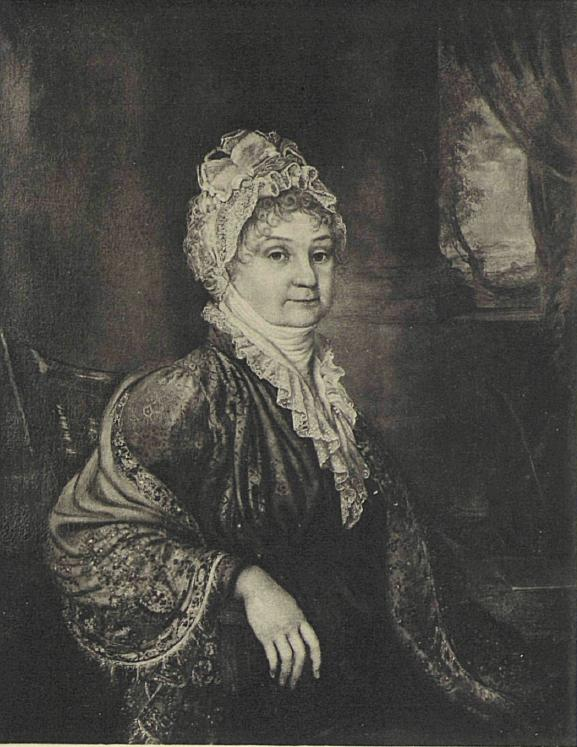
Ekaterina Ivanovna

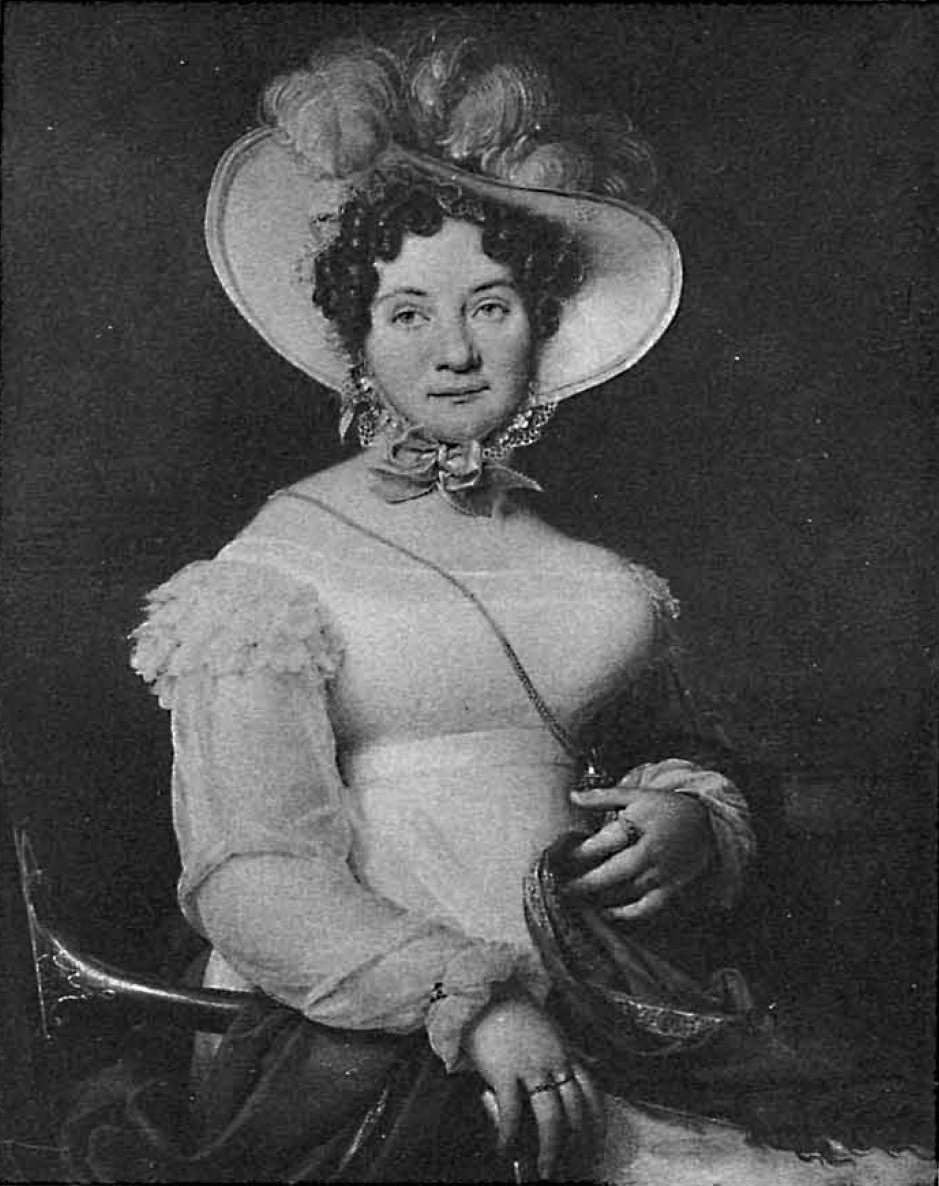
Alexandra Grigorievna

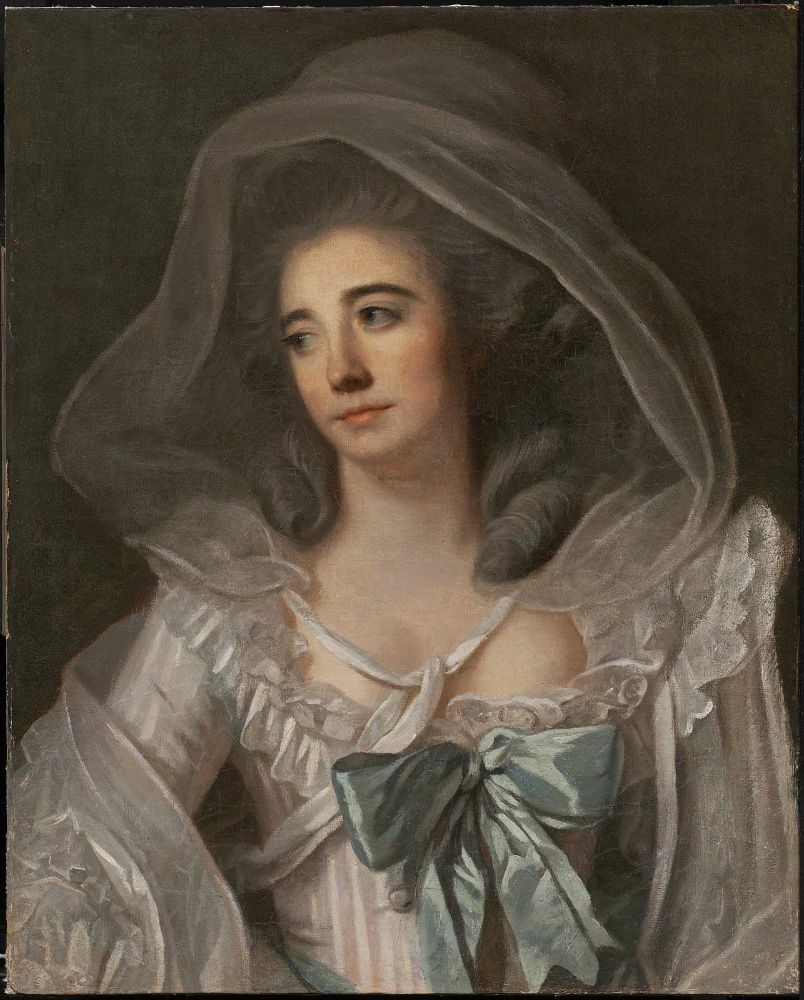
Anna Grigorievna

== Sources ==
- Nikolay Tupikov. Kozitsky, Grigory Vasilyevich // Encyclopedic Dictionary of Brockhaus and Efron: In 86 Volumes (82 Volumes and 4 Additional Ones) – Saint Petersburg, 1890–1907
