= Podyachy =

Historic office occupation in Russia

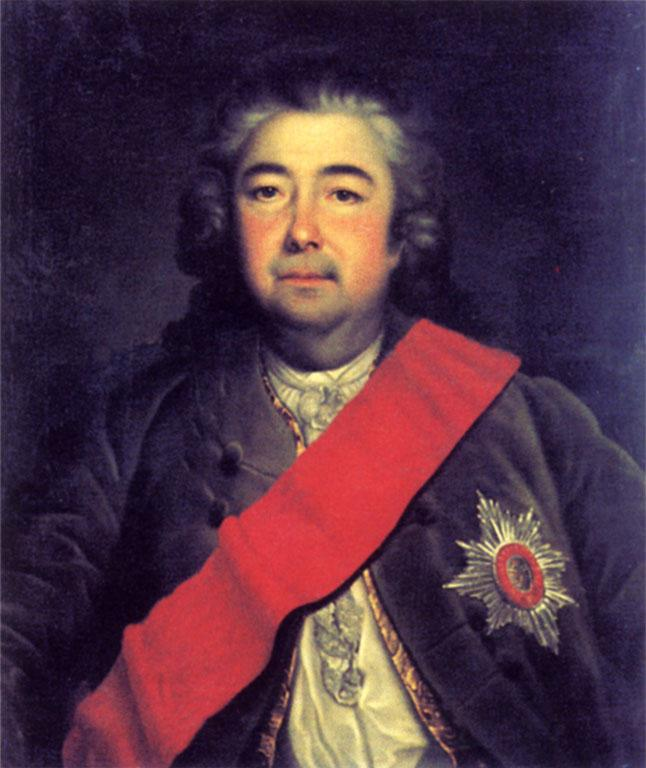
Ivan Cherkasov started his career as a podyachy

A podyachy or podyachiy (Russian: подьячий, подъячий; from Greek: ὑποδιάκονος, romanized: hypodiakonos, lit. 'assistant servant') was an office (bureaucratic) occupation in prikazes (local and upper governmental offices) and lesser local offices of Russia in the 15th to 18th centuries. The podyachyes were classified into junior, middle and senior. A senior podyachy (старший подьячий) could be a deputy to a dyak and helped him in some duties. Junior and middle ones were usually employed only as scribes.

== See also ==
- "Voyevoda#Siberia for their role in Siberian administration
- "Deacon#Cognates" for other historical terms derived from the Greek diakonos.
- Russian rank titles during the sixteenth and seventeenth centuries
