= Carl-Ludwig Christinek =

Russian painter

Carl-Ludwig Christinek (1730/1732–c.1794) was a Russian painter.

Christinek was born to German parents and was initially taught in German, but lived his whole life in Russia. He painted primarily portraits of Russian aristocracy. He settled down in St. Petersburg, where he died, c.1794. Among some of his notable works was a mosaic of the Battle of Poltava, produced at the Imperial Porcelain Factory, Saint Petersburg. In 1785, he did a portrait of the architect Yury Felten.

== Portrait gallery ==
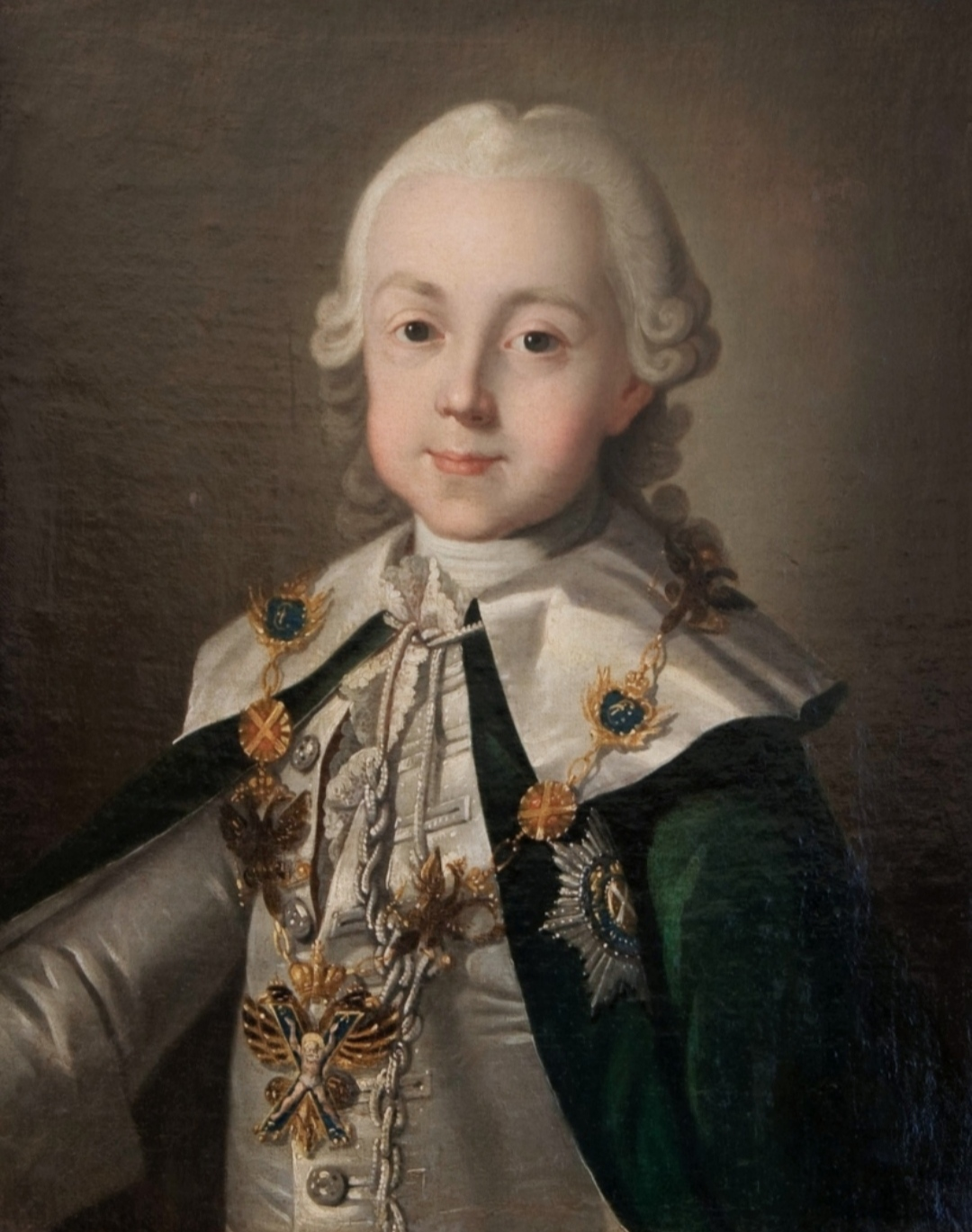
Paul I

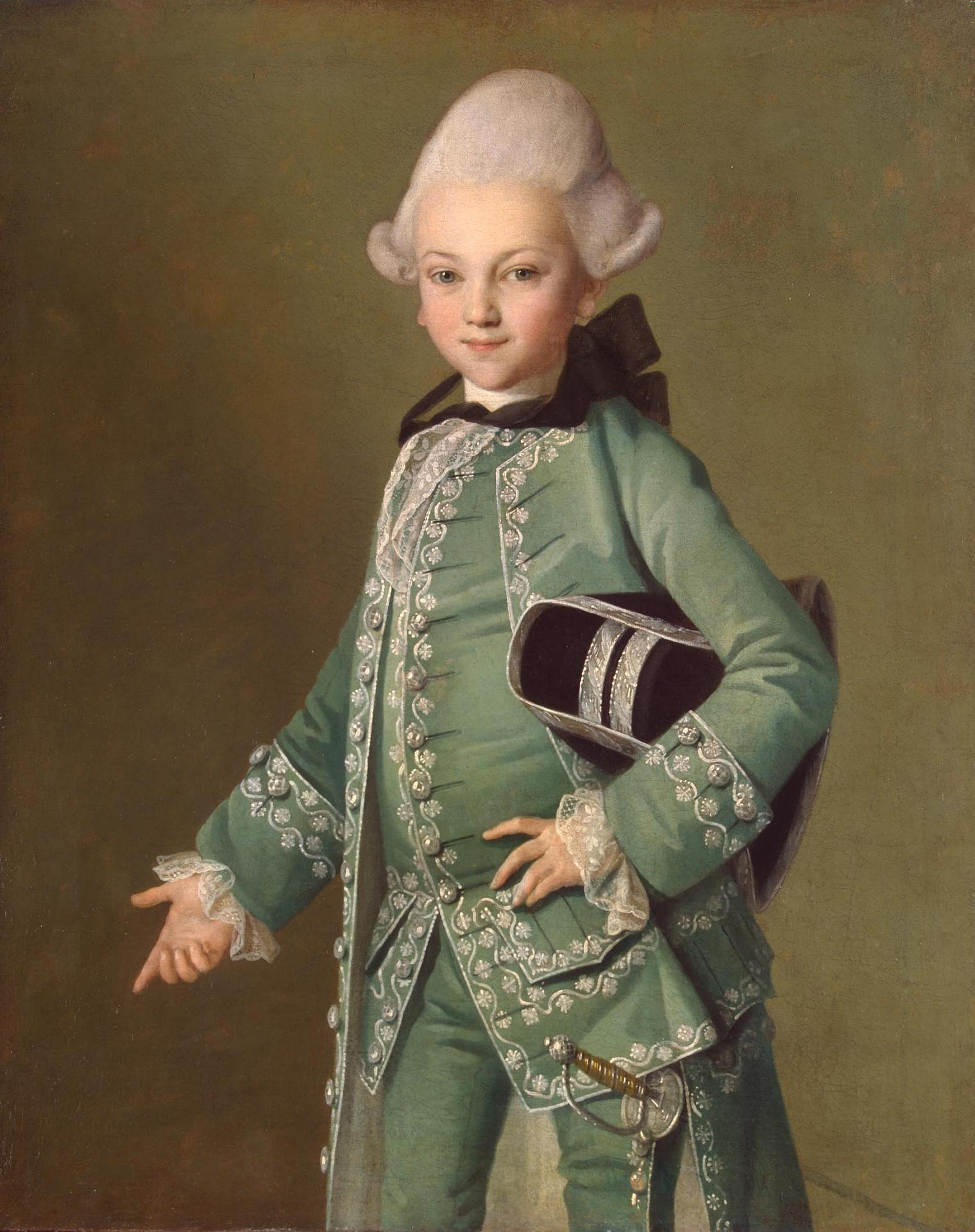
Alexei Bobrinsky

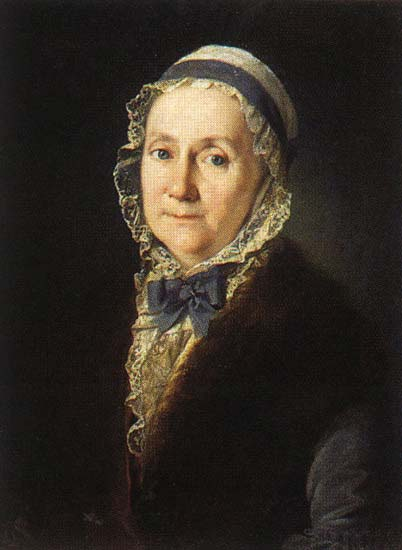
Teresa Ivanovich Schnee

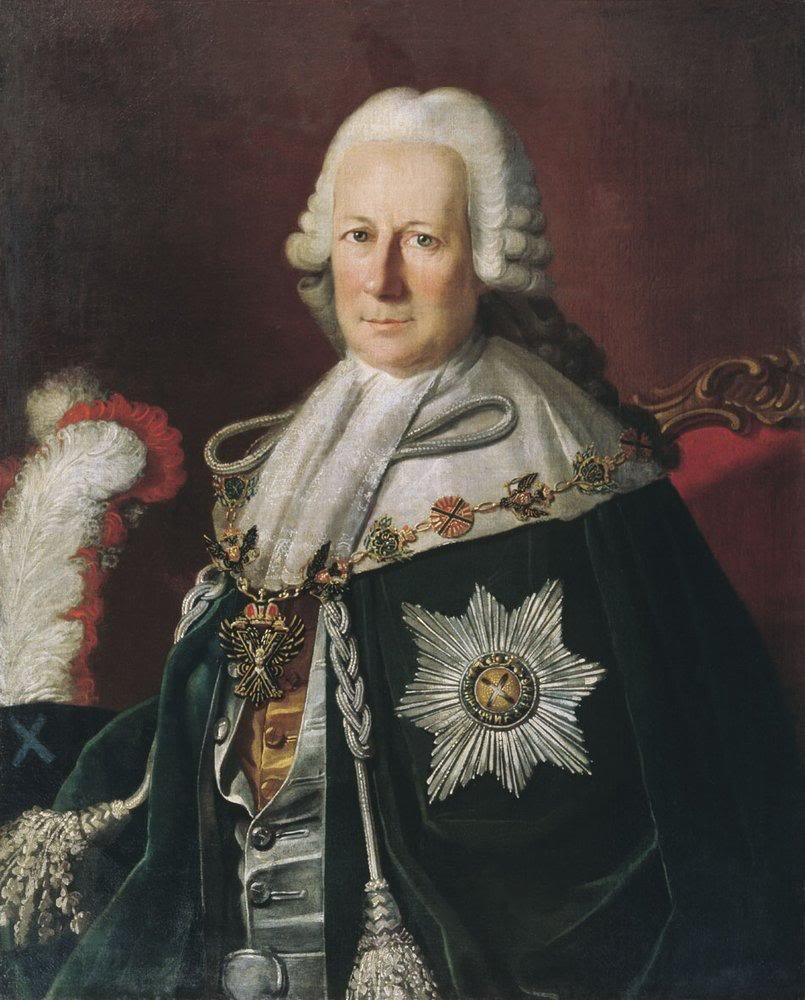
Semyon Ivanovich Mordvinov

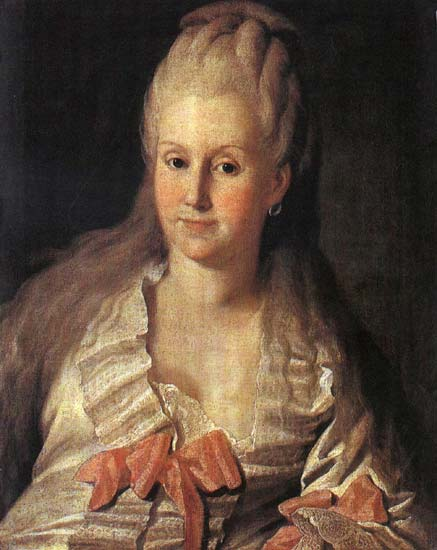
Anna Andreyevich Muravyova
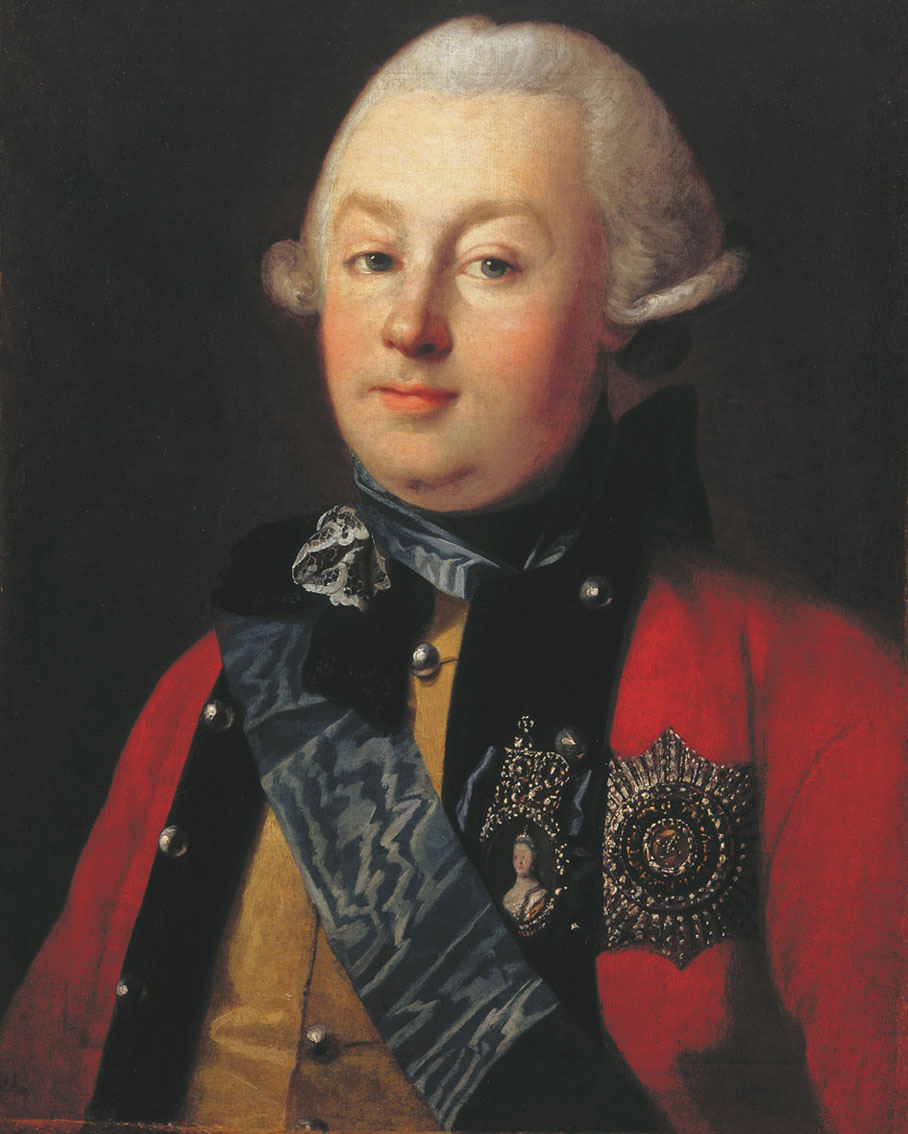
Grigory Grigoryevich Orlov

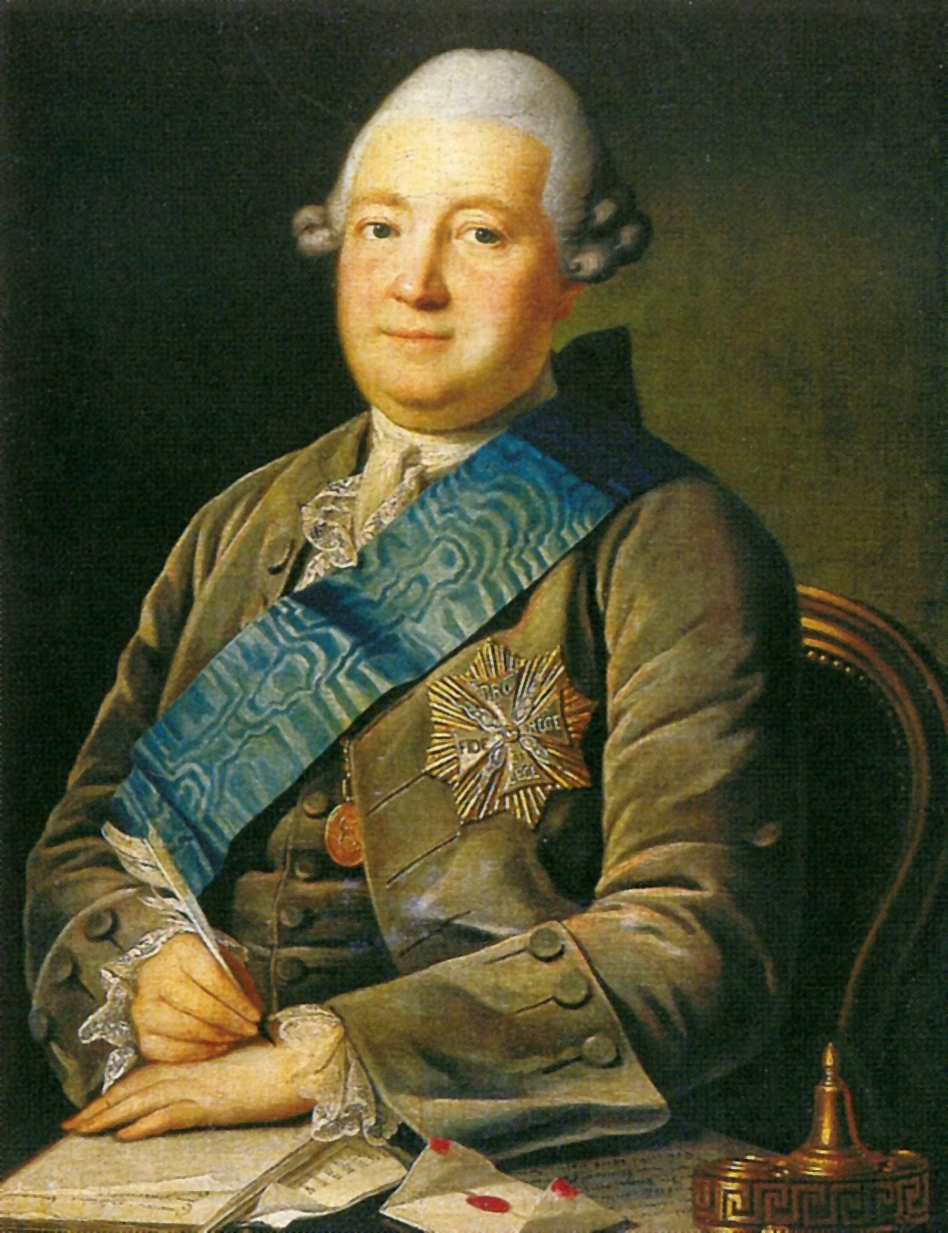
Adam Vasilyevich Olsufiev

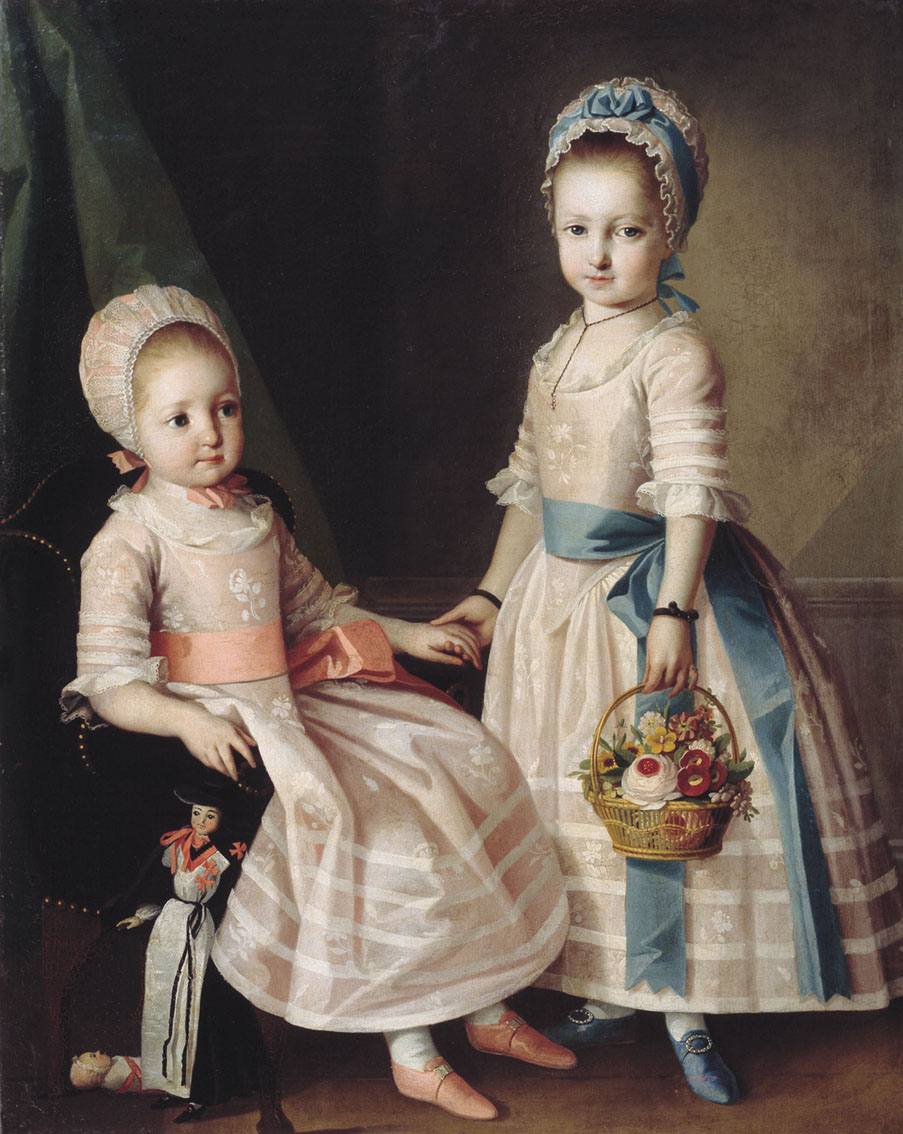
Two sisters
