= Adrian Gribovsky =

Adrian Moiseevich Gribovsky
- Адриан Моисеевич Грибовский
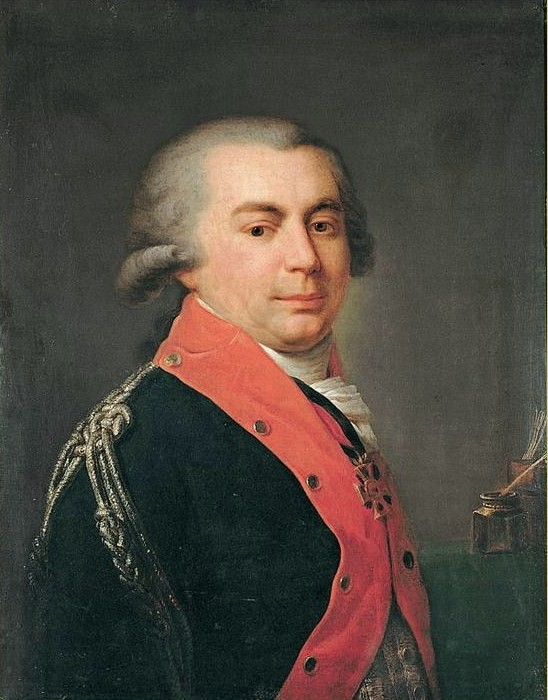

Personal details
- Born: August 26, 1767 Lubny, Russian Empire
- Died: January 28, 1834 (aged 66) Russian Empire
- Resting place: Kolomna
- Education: University Gymnasium
- Awards: Order of Saint Vladimir, 3rd Class (1795)

Adrian Moiseevich Gribovsky (August 26, 1767, Lubny – January 28, 1834) was a confidant of Platon Zubov, Cabinet Secretary of Catherine II in the last year of her reign, known mainly as the author of notes about this time. By rank – lieutenant colonel, court adviser. The owner of the Shchurovo Estate on the Oka.

== Early years ==
Born in Lubny on August 26, 1767. The son of a Cossack Yesaul, on his mother's side came from an old Little Russian noble family Sulim. Having become a widow, she took the vows at the Belogorsky Monastery, where she was abbess. In 1772, Gribovsky, together with his parents, came to Moscow, where from 1778 to 1782 he studied at the University Gymnasium "at his own expense". In 1782, he moved to Moscow University, but the next year he left his studies "to determine the state affairs".

In 1784, with the rank of provincial secretary, he was appointed to the Commission of the New Code. Then Gribovsky took up translations, his literary works were known to Gavriil Derzhavin, and in December 1784 the poet took the young writer to serve in Petrozavodsk, as Secretary of the Olonets Order of Public Charity, where he was then governor. On January 10, 1785, the Senate confirmed him in this position. From July 19 to September 13, 1785, with Derzhavin, he traveled around the Olonets Governorate, visiting the Kivach Waterfall, Kem, Kargopol and other villages of the region; together with another secretary, Nikolai Emin, kept a "day note". The clever Gribovsky soon earned the full confidence of his boss, which he cruelly deceived, acting as treasurer of the Order of Public Charity, losing state money in cards. Derzhavin hushed up the matter by compensating for the waste, but Gribovsky's reputation was seriously damaged. Gribovsky resigned from the service, having, however, received the rank of collegiate secretary.

== Service to Potemkin and Zubov ==
In June 1786, Gribovsky arrived in Saint Petersburg and settled in the house of Osip Kozodavlev. Gribovsky's attempts to get a job in the Commerce Collegium (through Alexander Vorontsov), and then in the Tambov Governorship as a director and teacher of public schools or secretary of the governorship (through Derzhavin) were unsuccessful. Only at the end of 1786, Gribovsky entered the Potemkin's Military Camping Office during the Turkish War under the command of Vasily Popov.

During the Russian–Turkish War of 1787–1791, Gribovsky was at the field office. In the winter of 1789, Gribovsky accompanied Potemkin to Saint Petersburg. As a person who owned a literary pen, he was entrusted with compiling journals of military operations, according to which Potemkin's reports were compiled to Catherine, and at the Iasi Congress – the duties of a conference secretary. Gribovsky's letter to Derzhavin about Potemkin's death (October 5, 1791) was apparently one of the first news of this event that reached Saint Petersburg.

The unexpected death of Potemkin and closeness to him not only did not ruin Gribovsky, but helped him get into the service of the former rival and enemy of the Tauride Prince – Platon Zubov with a letter of recommendation from Alexander Bezborodko, whose favor the seeking Gribovsky quickly managed to earn. On January 14, 1792, Gribovsky arrived in Saint Petersburg and four days later, renamed from court advisers to lieutenant colonels of the Izyum Light Horse Regiment, he was appointed governor of Zubov's office and soon became his right hand. In the same year, Gribovsky received land allotments on the left bank of the Tiligul estuary (12,000 acres), where the village of Tashino arose, and on the left bank of the Baraboy River at its confluence with the Black Sea (7,500 acres), it was called the village of Gribovka.

== Cabinet Secretary ==
The Empress recognized and appreciated Gribovsky's abilities and zeal, and on August 11, 1795, she made him her Secretary of State for accepting petitions. In addition, Gribovsky, on the instructions of the empress, studied civil laws and church charters to draw up a new charter for the Senate, and also worked on comments on the General Regulations of Peter I. Gribovsky took part in solving a number of political issues (organization of provinces in the former Little Russian regions; staffing of reserve battalions and squadrons; placement of settlers in the southern provinces, etc.). He, in particular, owns the text of the decree on the founding of Odessa. It is possible that the well–known phrase of Catherine II, said to Ivan Shuvalov, refers to Gribovsky: "Since people got into business from the university, I began to understand the incoming papers".

Gribovsky often abused his position. The large funds that Gribovsky now had allowed him to live widely, and in Saint Petersburg they were surprised at his luxury and extravagance. Cheerful and sociable, Gribovsky loved music, had his own orchestra and played the Stradivarius violin himself.

== Fall and bankruptcy ==
With the death of Catherine II and the accession of Paul I, the misadventures of Gribovsky began: on January 14, 1797, dismissed from all posts, he was expelled from St. Petersburg, and in May he was imprisoned in the Peter and Paul Fortress, due to complaints about paintings missing from the Tauride Palace and illegal resettlement of state peasants.

Having paid the penalties, Gribovsky was released at the beginning of 1799, but the next he was sent to Shlisselburg, accused of selling state lands in Novorossia. On February 14, 1801, he was released from prison due to the efforts of his wife, but until the death of Paul I he was under police supervision.

After his release, he settled in his estate in the Podolsk Province, Vishnevchik, from where he soon moved to live in Moscow. Here, with his former luxurious life, Gribovsky upset his condition and in 1814, settled in the village of Shchurov, which had survived from him, on the Oka River, opposite of Kolomna. An attempt to improve matters by farming ended in failure, and in 1817, Gribovsky declared himself insolvent. Almost until the end of his life, he busied himself with government jobs in order to justify himself from the accusation of malicious bankruptcy; the process ended in his favor, but consumed the remainder of his fortune.

He died on January 28, 1834, and was buried in the Kolomna Golutvin Monastery. He did not leave a good memory among his contemporaries: being only 19 years old, he squandered money; saved by Derzhavin, he repaid him with ingratitude; indebted to Zubov for everything, under Paul he made an attempt to harm him for selfish reasons. In the last years of his life (1830–1834), Gribovsky worked on "Notes", covering the period from 1783 to 1802 and conveying many features of court life and characteristics of the most important figures in the reign of Catherine II.

== Family ==
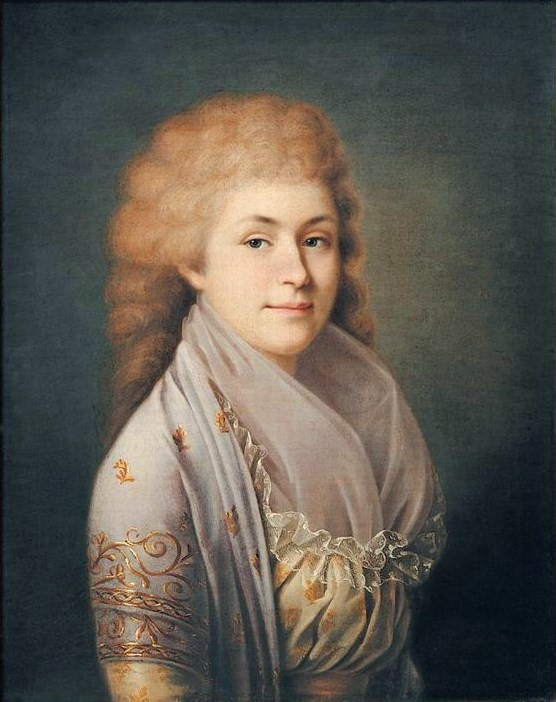
Natalya Akimovna, wife of Gribovsky

He was married to Natalia Chistyakova (d. 1834), daughter of Second Major Akim Chistyakov. She was distinguished by her beauty, was a good housewife and a loving wife. Gribovsky's notes more than once mention how she took care of him during his imprisonment in the Peter and Paul and Shlisselburg fortresses, from where he was released through her efforts. She lived almost constantly on the estate of Vishnevchik in the Podolsk Province and in Shchurov, where she herself ran an extensive household, in the end completely upset by various debts. She died on January 27, 1834, on the eve of her husband's death. She was buried in the Golutvin Monastery in Kolomna. Children:

- Elena (1794 – after 1858), married to Lieutenant Colonel Vasily Guberti (1784–1843), later a mayor in Kolomna. Their son was the famous Moscow bibliographer and collector Nikolai Guberti;
- Nikolai (1795 – after 1863), a graduate of the school of column guides, served in a dragoon regiment, and then in the city of Poti in the customs department.

== Awards ==
- Order of Saint Vladimir, 3rd Degree (September 22, 1795)

== Bibliography ==
- Notes on Empress Catherine the Great by Colonel Adrian Gribovsky, Secretary of State, Who was With Her Person (Moscow, 1847);
- A Collection of Various Reports Received from the Commanders–in–Chief of the Armies and Fleets to the Court: from the Originals Sent to the Imperial Academy of Sciences for Publication in Vedomosti / Compiled by Adrian Gribovsky. Saint Petersburg: at the Imperial Academy of Sciences, 1791–1796;
- Memoirs and Diaries of Adrian Gribovsky, Secretary of State of Empress Catherine the Great, With an Original Manuscript, a Portrait and a Photograph of Handwriting. Moscow, University Printing House, 1899;
- Tobias George Smollett. Cheerful Book, or Human Pranks / from English [translated by Adrian Gribovsky]

== Sources ==
- Andrey Andreev (2010). "Gribovsky Adrian Moiseevich". Imperial Moscow University (1755–1917): Encyclopedic Dictionary. Compiled by Andrey Andreev, Dmitry Tsygankov. Moscow: Russian Political Encyclopedia. p. 191. ISBN 978-5-8243-1429-8.
- Alexander Panchenko, ed. (1988–1999). "Gribovsky Adrian Moiseevich". Dictionary of the Russian Language of the 18th Century – Moscow: Institute of Russian Literature and Language.
- Russian Portraits of the 18th and 19th Centuries. Edition of the Grand Duke Nikolai Mikhailovich
