= Ivan Cherkasov =

Russian statesman, privy councillor, and cabinet secretary

Ivan Antonovich Cherkasov
- Иван Антонович Черкасов
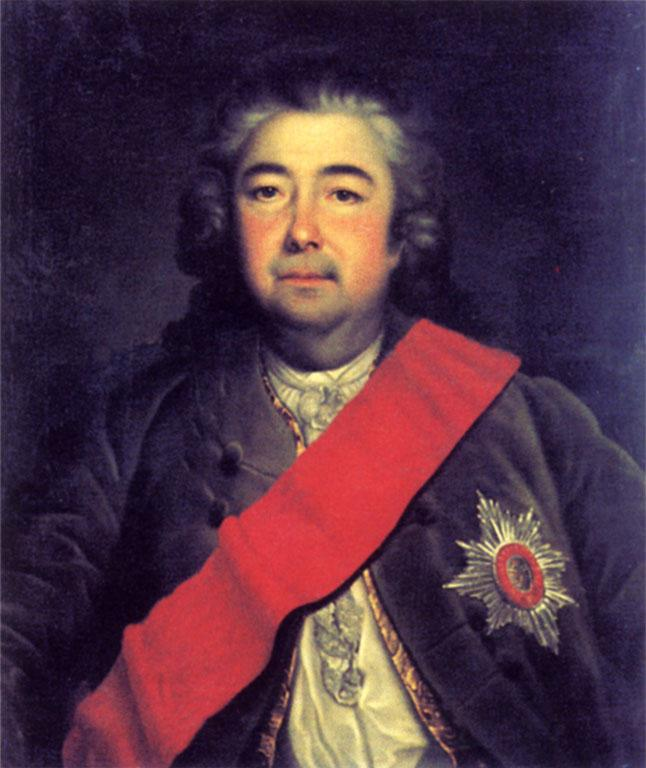
- Born: 6 February 1692
- Died: 30 October 1758 (aged 66)
- Occupation: Statesman
- Father: Anton Romanovich Gus
- Awards: Order of Saint Alexander Nevsky

Baron (from 1742) Ivan Antonovich Cherkasov (6 February 1692 — 30 October 1758) was a Russian statesman, privy councillor, cabinet secretary to Peter the Great, Catherine I and Elizabeth Petrovna. From him comes the baronial clan of Cherkasovs.

== Ancestry ==
Born in the family of Anton Romanovich, who had the nickname "Gus". Information about the father of Ivan Antonovich Cherkasov, reported by the latter during the execution of documents elevating him to baronial dignity, reads:

...his father, Anton Romanov, the son Cherkasov was known by the name Gus was born in Little Russia in the town of Sosnitsy, and was raised in Great Russia and named Cherkasov, and his father was in the services namely: he was the cooker of the Tambov bishop’s house, and was appointed a commissioner in Voronezh to the ship building of which was built from the monasteries of the entire state, and in 1735, being already from 1710 to 1718 in monasticism in the Kiev Bologna Monastery, die

Thus, contrary to popular belief, the name of Cherkasov (from Cherkas, the Little Russian) was worn by Ivan Antonovich’s father.

== Start of service ==
In 1705, at the age of 13, Ivan Antonovich entered as a podyachy of an orderly hut in Vladimir. He served in Kozlov, Bezhetsk Upland, Uglich under Prince Gregory Volkonsky. In 1710 he entered the clerk of the provincial office in Arkhangelsk. From 1711 — in Moscow, the clerk of the Kremlin Armoury. In 1712 he moved to St. Petersburg, starting his service in the capital as clerk under Alexey Makarov, secret office secretary to Peter I.

As an office servant of the monarch, Ivan Cherkasov accompanied Peter on his trips around Russia, fulfilling the duties of quartermaster. In 1717, together with Peter traveled abroad (in the Netherlands and France). Gradually he became one of the trustees of Peter I, accompanied him during the Russo-Persian War of 1722–1723. In 1723, for faithful service, he received villages with 280 peasant souls.

After the death of Peter the Great, under Catherine I, Cherkasov retained his position, using the trust of the empress. On 5 December 1725 he was appointed as secret office secretary. He was close with Bestuzhevs, entering the party of opponents of Alexander Menshikov.

== Proscription ==
After the accession to the throne of Peter II, Menshikov’s positions at the court became even stronger. One of the results of Menshikov's rise was the expulsion of Ivan Cherkasov to Moscow, which took place in an orderly manner on 11 July 1727. Subsequently, despite the fall of Menshikov, Cherkasov’s position did not improve: by the decision of the Supreme Privy Council he was sent as chief inspector to Arkhangelsk, and soon after that he was involved in the case of Princess Agrafena Volkonskaya and other members of the Bestuzhevsky Circle. On 24 May 1728 Ivan Antonovich was interrogated at a meeting of the Supreme Privy Council. However, serious evidence against him was not found, and Cherkasov was exiled to Astrakhan "to food affairs", where he was before Elizabeth Petrovna took the throne.

== Rise during Elizabeth's rule ==
Elizaveta Petrovna, who favored her father's comrades-in-arms, called Cherkasov from exile to St. Petersburg, where on 10 December 1741 Ivan Antonovich was granted as active state councillor and appointed at the court of Her Majesty "for the administration of indoor writing affairs". Years after the abolition of the Supreme Privy Council, the new autocrat restored the personal imperial office that existed under Peter I — the Cabinet of His Imperial Majesty, where Cherkasov was entrusted with the business, and he began to play a greater role at the court, occupying a position not only of the secretary’s office, but also a close friend of the empress. Through Cherkasov’s hands, practically all matters were carried out, both of national importance and of minor importance (up to the delivery of fresh grapes to the yard and others). Ivan Antonovich was literally showered with the blessings of the Empress: on 6 May 1742, the occasion of the coronation of Elizaveta Petrovna, he was elevated to baronial dignity, in 1744 he was granted villages in the Dorogobuzh Uyezd of the Smolensk Governorate, and in 1745 Cherkasov was promoted to privy councillors.

In 1744, Elizaveta Petrovna, interested in the production of Russian porcelain, commissioned Ivan Cherkasov to organize the Porcelain Manufactory and the subsequent supervision of it.

Among the 10 highest dignitaries of the Russian Empire, Ivan Cherkasov also participated in the discussion of the Prussian-Saxon question (the so-called question of the Austrian legacy). On 7 September 1747 by the highest decree, he was invited to a meeting of the College of Foreign Affairs to discuss questions about the situation in Persia.

Cherkasov's letters to Count Nikita Panin and others were printed in the Historical Bulletin (1880, Vol. I) and the Russian Archive (1882, Vol. II).

== Family ==
Ivan Antonovich Cherkasov was married to Elena Ivanovich Topilskaya. Children:

- Alexander (1728–1788) — President of the Medical Board, active privy councillor;
- Ivan (1732–1811) — Vice admiral;
- Catherine, wife of Colonel Yevgraf Tatishchev, the eldest son of Vasily Tatishchev;
- Peter, married to Elizabeth Nikolaevna Zherebtsova.

== Sources ==
- Dmitry Kornyuschenko, Ekaterina Makeeva. The family of Cherkasovs in the history of Russia of the XVII — XX centuries. Historical genealogical research. Moscow, 2006
- Ivan Antonovich Cherkasov (Brockhaus and Efron Encyclopedic Dictionary)
- Sukhareva, Olga (2005). Who Was Who in Russia from Peter I to Paul I.
