= Vasili Gogol-Yanovsky =

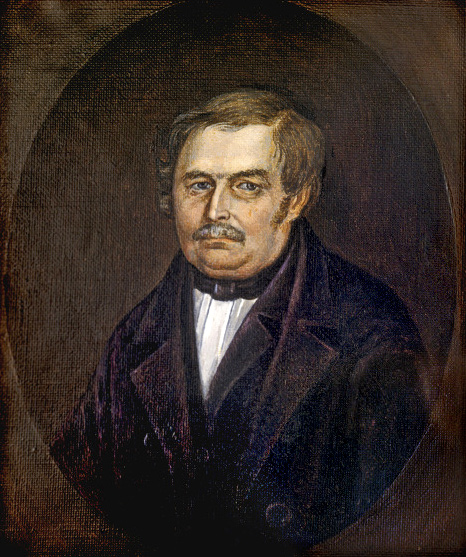
Vasili Gogol-Yanovsky

Vasili Afanasyevich Gogol-Yanovsky (Russian: Василий Афанасьевич Гоголь-Яновский; 1777 – 31 March (11 April) 1825), also known as Vasyl Panasovych Hohol-Yanovsky (Ukrainian: Василь Панасович Гоголь-Яновський), was an author of a number of theater pieces in Russian and in Ukrainian and father of the writer Nikolai Gogol. He was the landlord of the village of Vasilyevka (now Hoholeve, Poltava Oblast) and descendant of Ukrainian Cossack noble families of Gogol (Hohol) and Lizogub.

Vasili Gogol-Yanovsky loved writing comedic stage plays in Russian as well as in Ukrainian, which were successfully put on by the famous theatre patron Dmitry Troshchinsky.

== Biography ==
Vasili was a son of Opanas Demianovych Gogol-Yanovsky (1739–1798) and Tatyana Semenivna Lizohub (1760–1826).

According to legend, one ancestor, Ostap Hohol, was famous as a Cossack colonel and Hetman of Right-Bank Ukraine. His grandfather and great grandfather were Orthodox priests. He attended the Poltava Theological Seminary and was a member of the Zaporizhian Army.

Having spent some time at the post service, Vasili left in 1805, with the rank of Collegiate Assessor and retired to his own estate Vasilyevka (Yanovshchina) to devote himself to farming.

Vasili Gogol-Yanovsky was a friend of Dmitry Prokofyevich Troshchinsky, Minister of the State Council, and a distant relative. Vasili Afanasyevich was the director and actor in the Troshchinsky Home Theater between 1812 and 1825. In this capacity, he wrote several musical comedies based upon Ukrainian culture and folklore. Vasili Gogol-Yanovsky also wrote poems in the Russian and Ukrainian languages. Alexander Danilevsky noted that Vasili was a "matchless storyteller".

== Works ==
- (in Ukrainian) Собака-Вивця // Записки о жизни Н. В. Гоголя. V. 1. – 1856. – pp. 15–16.
- (in Russian) Простакъ, или хитрость женщины, перехитренная солдатомъ // Osnova. – 1862. – # 2. – pp. 19–43.
