= Grigory Kondoidi =

Biography

Grigory Pavlovich Kondoidi
- Григорий Павлович Кондоиди
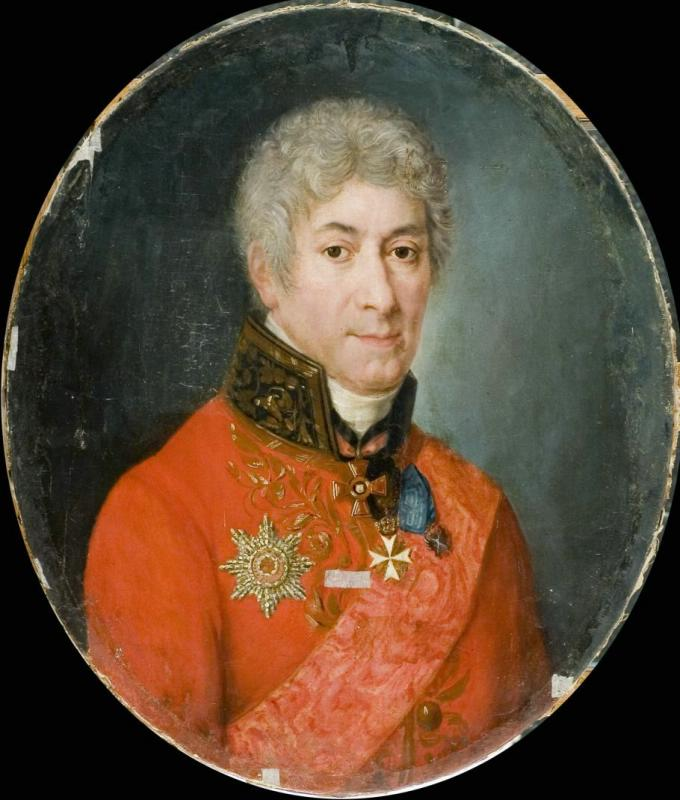
- Portrait by an unknown artist, 1811–1817

Senator of the Russian Empire
- In office 1811–1817

Personal details
- Born: January 25, 1754
- Died: November 7, 1817 (aged 63) Saint Petersburg, Russian Empire
- Resting place: Alexander Nevsky Lavra
- Relations: Kondoidis
- Parent: Pavel Kondoidi (father)
- Awards: Order of Saint Vladimir; Order of Saint Anna; Order of Saint John of Jerusalem

Grigory Pavlovich Kondoidi (1754–1817) was a privy councillor, senator, Secretary of the Orders of Saint Anna, Saint Alexander Nevsky and Saint Andrew the First–Called.

== Biography ==
Born into the family of a physician–in–law, privy councilor Pavel Kondoidi (1710–1760).

He served in the Collegium of Foreign Affairs.

Under Paul I, he went to serve in the chapter of the Russian Order of Cavalry as secretary of the Order of Saint Anna (1797–1799). In August 1799, he was appointed secretary of the Order of Saint Alexander Nevsky, and three months later – secretary of the Order of Saint Andrew the First–Called (1799–1800).

In 1804–1811 – President of the Main Postal Board.

In 1811, he was appointed senator in the third department of the Senate.

== Awards ==
- Order of Saint Vladimir, 4th Degree (1784);
- Order of Saint Vladimir, 3rd Degree (September 2, 1793);
- Order of Saint Anna, 1st Degree (December 26, 1799);
- Order of Saint John of Jerusalem Honorary Commander's Cross (January 1, 1801).

== Family ==
Wife (from April 24, 1782) – Natalya Olsufieva (April 15, 1758 – December 30, 1826), daughter of the Secretary of State of Catherine II Adam Olsufiev and his wife Maria Saltykova (1728–1792). She inherited from her mother a mansion at 24, English Embankment. Children:

- Elizaveta Grigorievna (1786–1818), married Chuikevich;
- Vladimir Grigorievich (1788–1827), collegiate counselor.
