= Glebovskoye =

Glebovskoye Глебовское
- Selo
- Location within Vladimir Oblast Location within Russia
- Coordinates: 56°24′N 40°29′E
- Country: Russia
- Region: Vladimir Oblast
- District: Suzdalsky District
- Time zone: UTC+3:00

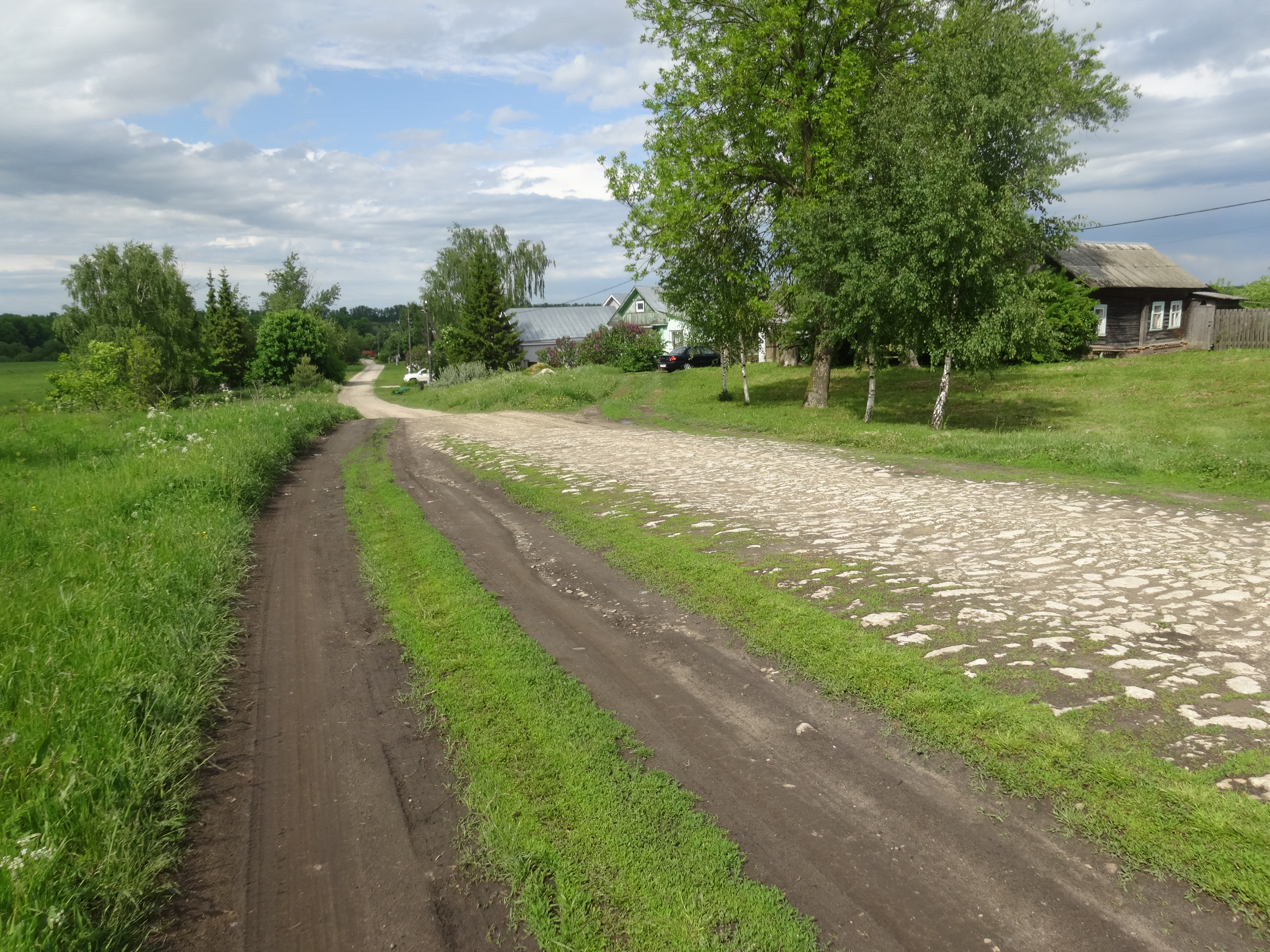
The village of Glebovskoye, Suzdal district, Vladimir region

Glebovskoye (Russian: Глебовское) is a rural locality (a selo) in Seletskoye Rural Settlement, Suzdalsky District, Vladimir Oblast, Russia. The population was 142 as of 2010. There are 6 streets.

== Geography ==
Glebovskoye is located on the Kamenka River, 5 km east of Suzdal (the district's administrative centre) by road. Suzdal is the nearest rural locality.
