= Ekaterina Kozitskaya =

Russian industrialist

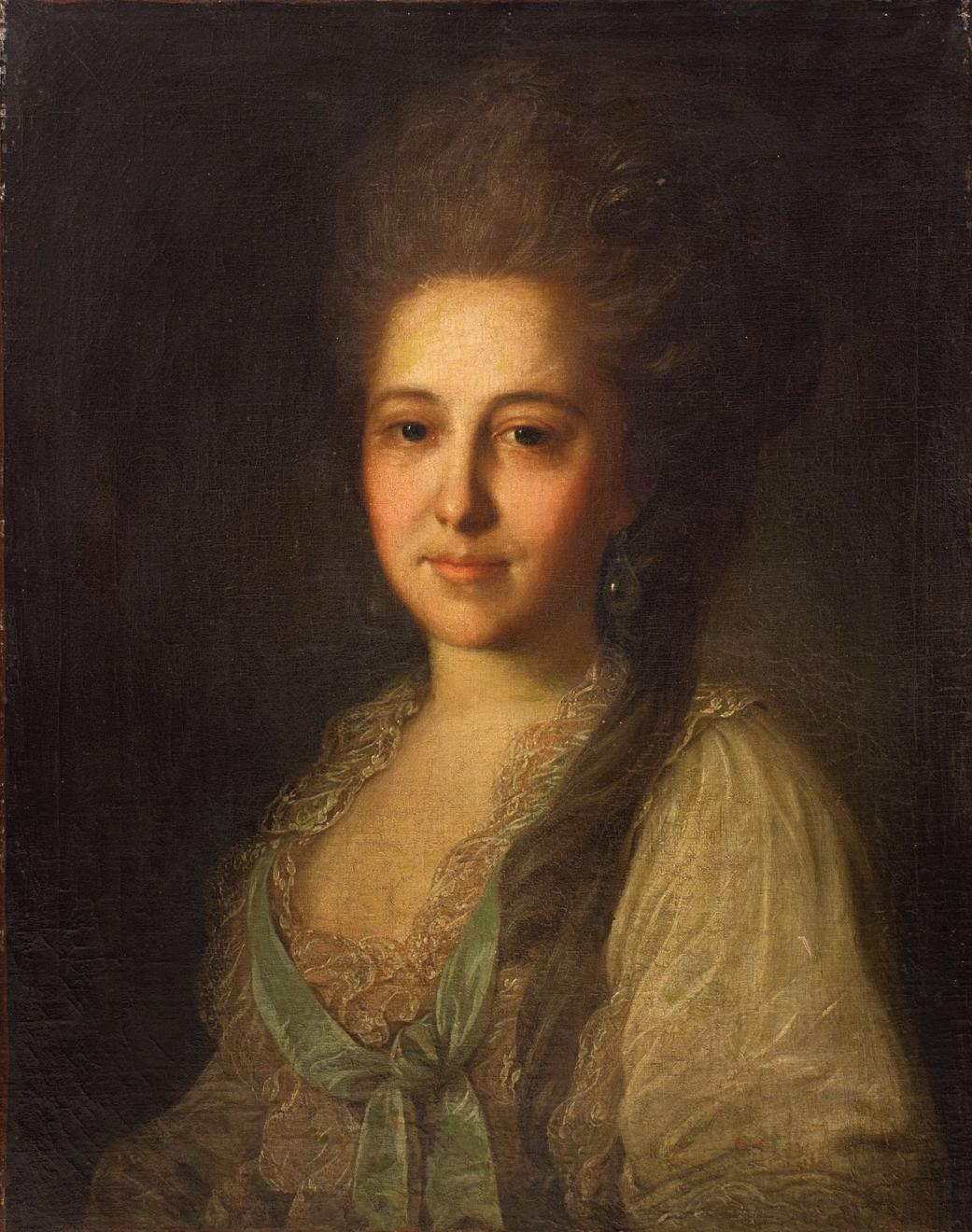
A portrait by Fyodor Rokotov

Ekaterina Ivanovna Kozitskaya, née Myasnikova (1746 – 1833) was a Russian industrialist. She was the daughter and heiress of the copper miner Ivan Semyonovich Myasnikov and married Grigory Kozitsky, one of the secretaries of Catherine the Great. She inherited the copper mines in Ust-Katav and elsewhere in the Urals. She managed the mines herself with great success and has been called the richest woman in 18th-century Russia.

Kozitskaya was allowed to attend the imperial court, although many courtiers suspected her of observing, in private, the rites of Old Believers. Her husband died within four years after their wedding, from 32 knife wounds inflicted by himself in a fit of depression. They had two daughters, Alexandra and Anna.

The asteroid 3702 Trubetskaya is named after her.

== Other sources ==
- Сухарева О. В. Кто был кто в России от Петра I до Павла I. — М.: АСТ, 2004.
