= Cabinet Secretary of the Russian Empire =

Government post in the Russian Empire

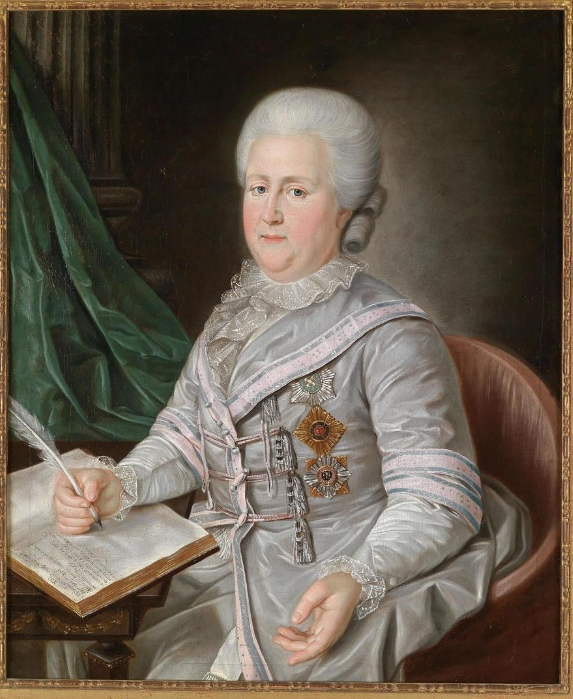
The emergence of the post of cabinet secretary is connected with the name of Catherine the Great

The Cabinet Secretary or State Secretary was a government post that existed in the Russian Empire during the reign of Catherine the Great and her son Paul. The Chancery of State Secretaries was separated from the Imperial Cabinet in 1763 and served as the personal office of the monarch until the establishment of ministries in 1802.

After accession to the throne, Catherine II commissioned Adam Olsufiev, Ivan Yelagin and Grigory Teplov to manage her affairs. In June 1763, the order of reception of petitions addressed to the Empress by Cabinet Secretaries was documented. They also handed her complaints of red tape in institutions. Previously, such requests were collected by the General Master of Records through his office.

The secretaries were on duty at the empress's reception all day and came to her on the first call. Catherine was accustomed to hearing the secretaries on a daily basis and only by the end of the reign reduced the number of audiences to two per week. Having received the Empress's resolution on this or that petition, the secretaries sent documents to the Governing Senate and other government agencies.

Each Cabinet Secretary had its own office, and its size indirectly testified to the weight of one or another secretary. In the 1780s, Alexander Bezborodko possessed the largest office. To the "younger" secretaries (Sergey Kozmin, Peter Pastukhov), the empress entrusted mainly technical issues, they took the petition personally. At the time of the Empress's death, three people were in charge of "Her Imperial Majesty's own affairs" — Dmitry Troschinsky, Petr Turchaninov and Adrian Gribovsky.

Almost all of the secretaries of state were people of small wealth and not particularly well-born. Of the 16 Catherine's secretaries, 6 were from Cossack officers. The position of the cabinet secretary gave them the opportunity to make connections with the court and, thanks to their efficiency, move up the career ladder, which Bezborodko and Zavadovsky, for example, used to the full.

== Cabinet Secretaries of Catherine the Great ==
- Adam Olsufiev (1762–1764)
- Ivan Yelagin (1762–1768)
- Grigory Teplov (1762–1768)
- Sergey Kozmin (1763–1780)
- Grigory Kozitsky (1768–1775)
- Stepan Strekalov (1771–1774)
- Peter Pastukhov (1773–1796)
- Pyotr Zavadovsky (1776–1793)
- Alexander Bezborodko (1775–1796)
- Peter Soymonov (1779–1796)
- Petr Turchaninov (1779–1796)
- Alexander Khrapovitsky (1783–1793)
- Vasili Popov (1786–1797)
- Gavrila Derzhavin (1791–1793)
- Dmitry Troschinsky (1793–1798)
- Adrian Gribovsky (1795–1796)

== Cabinet Secretaries of Paul I ==
- Yury Neledinsky-Meletsky (1796–1798)
- Peter Obreskov (1797–1798)
- Dmitry Neplyuev (1798–1800)
- Ivan Kutaisov (1800–1801)
- Fedor Engel (1801)

== Sources ==
- Peryshkin, Mikhail (2004). Institute of State Secretaries under Catherine II (1762—1796).
