= Orlov (surname) =

Orlov (Russian: Орлов; masculine) or Orlova (Орлова; feminine) is a Russian surname derived from the noun орёл "eagle". It is shared by the following people:

== People ==
- Orlov (family), a Russian noble family
- Aleksandr Orlov (disambiguation), several people
- Aleksey Orlov (politician) (b. 1961), Russian-Kalmyk politician
- Alexei Grigoryevich Orlov (1737–1808), Russian military leader
- Alina Orlova, Lithuanian singer-songwriter
- Andrey Orlov or Orlusha, Russian poet, and journalist
- Boris Orlov (disambiguation), several people
- Dal Orlov (1935–2021), Russian film critic, journalist, and screenwriter
- Dmitri Orlov, Russian hockey player
- Dmitry Orlov (disambiguation), several people
- Dorothy Orlov (mother of actor Paul Michael Glaser)
- Georgi Orlov (1884–1941), Russian-Estonian politician
- Igor Orlov, several people
- Ivan Orlov (aviator) (1895–1917), World War I flying ace
- Ivan Orlov (philosopher) (1886–1936), philosopher
- Jakob Orlov (b. 1985), Swedish footballer
- Janina Orlov (b. 1952), Finnish-Swedish translator
- Lyubov Orlova (1902–1975), Soviet actress
- Marina Orlova (actress), Russian actress
- Marina Orlova (YouTuber), YouTube celebrity philologist
- Mikhail Orlov (racewalker) (b. 1967), Russian race walker
- Natalya Orlova (b. 1969), Russian politician
- Nikolai or Nikolay Orlov, several people
- Oleg Orlov (b. 1953), Russian biologist, post-Soviet human rights activist
- Raisa Orlova (1918–1989), Russian writer and American studies scholar
- Sergei Orlov (disambiguation), multiple people
- Svetlana Orlova (disambiguation), multiple people
- Vasily Orlov-Denisov (1775–1843), Russian cavalry general
- Vladimir Orlov (speed skater) (b. 1938), Russian speed skater
- Vladimir Aljakseevich Orlov (b. 1953), also known as Uładzimir Arłou, Belarusian historian, writer, politician, and poet
- Vladimir Mitrofanovich Orlov (1895–1938), Soviet military leader
- Yuri Orlov (1924–2020), Soviet nuclear physicist, dissident and a human rights activist

== Fictional characters ==
- Aleksandr Orlov, an anthropomorphic meerkat from the Compare the Meerkat advertising campaign
- Bo Orlov, a character in the Netflix series Grand Army
- General Orlov, a villain in the James Bond film Octopussy
- Georgiy Ivanych Orlov, a character in the Chekhov novella The Story of an Unknown Man.
- Yuri Orlov, arms dealer and central character of the film Lord of War

== See also ==
- Akvilev
