= Bee sting =

Puncture wound caused by a bee's stinger

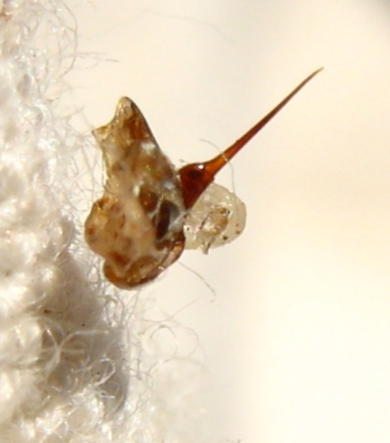
- The stinger of a honey bee separated from the body and attached to a protective dressing
- Specialty: Emergency medicine
- Symptoms: Pain, itching, swelling
- Complications: Allergic reaction
- Causes: Female bees
- Risk factors: swelling, rash, shortness of breath
- Medication: Antihistamine, epinephrine (for allergic reaction)

A bee sting is the wound and pain caused by the stinger of a female bee puncturing skin. Bee stings differ from insect bites, with the venom of stinging insects having considerable chemical variation. The reaction of a person to a bee sting may vary according to the bee species and the person's own immune response. While bee stinger venom is slightly acidic and causes only mild pain in most people, allergic reactions may occur in people with allergies to venom components, which can be life-threatening if not treated immediately.

== Honey bee stings ==
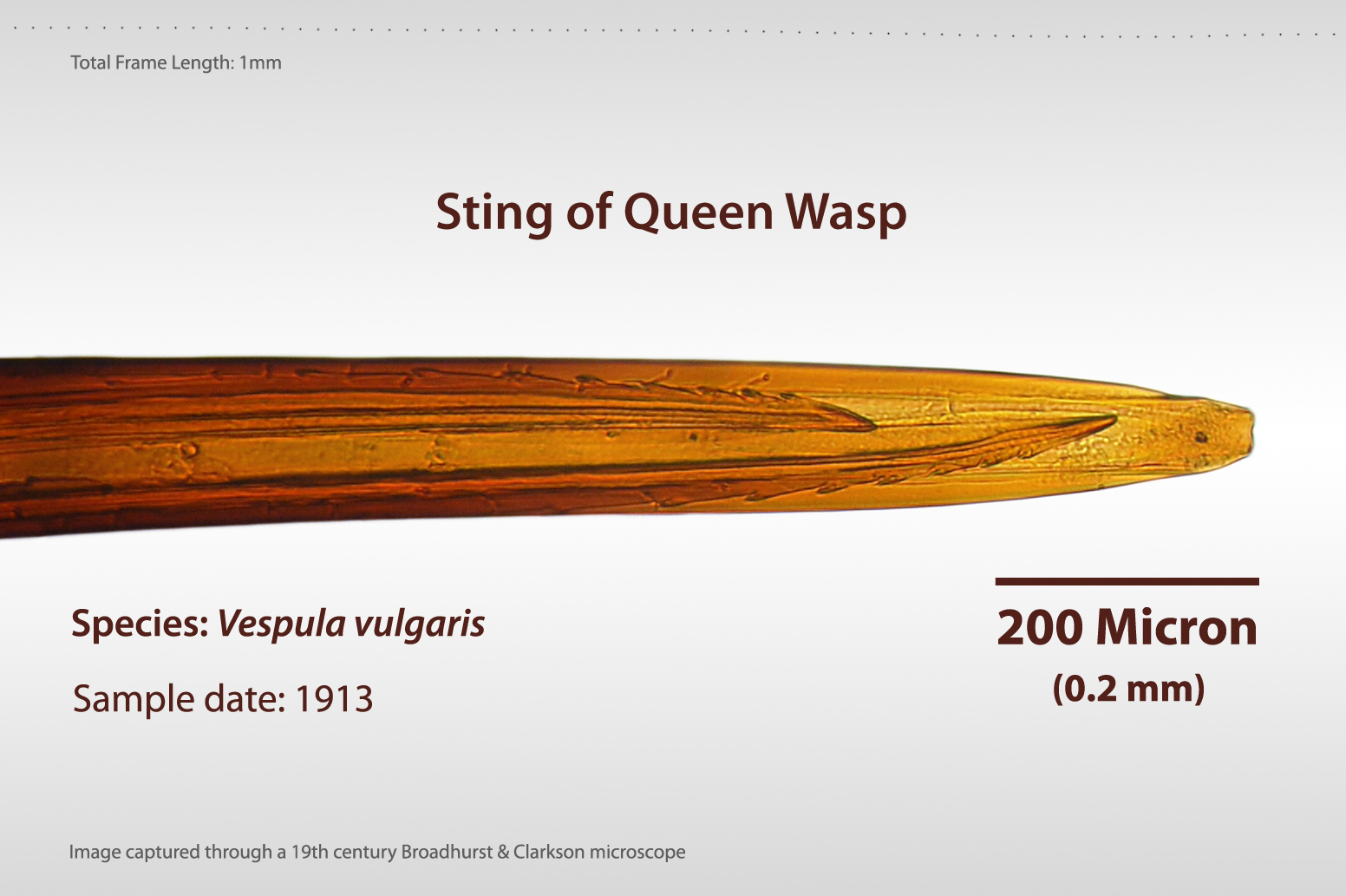
Microscope magnified image of a queen wasp's stinger, showing stylus and barbed lancets

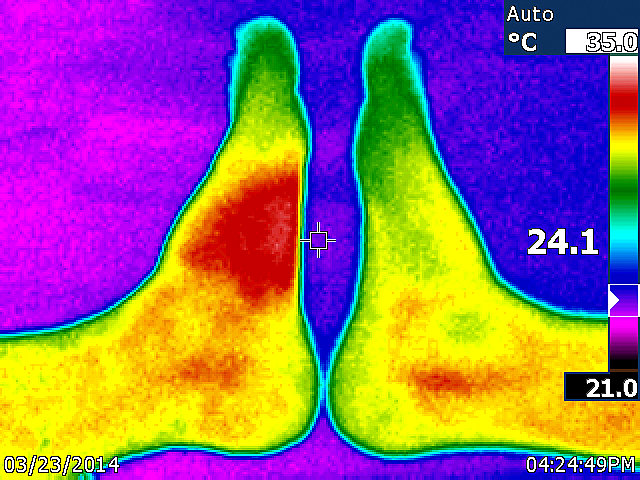
The left side of the image shows the ≈4 °C (7 °F) temperature increase (saturated red zone) caused by a bee sting after about 28 hours

A honey bee that is away from the hive foraging for nectar or pollen will rarely sting, except when stepped on or roughly handled. Honey bees will actively seek out and sting when they perceive the hive to be threatened, often being alerted to this by the release of attack pheromones (below).

Although it is widely believed that a worker honey bee can sting only once, this is only partially true: although the stinger is in fact barbed so that it lodges in the victim's skin, tearing loose from the bee's abdomen and leading to its death in minutes, this only happens if the skin of the victim is sufficiently thick, such as a mammal's. Honey bees are the only hymenoptera with a strongly barbed sting, though yellow jackets and some other wasps have small barbs.

The venom of the honeybee contains histamine, mast cell degranulating peptide, melittin, phospholipase A2, hyaluronidase and acid phosphatase. The three proteins in honeybee venom that are important allergens are phospholipase A2, hyaluronidase and acid phosphatase. In addition, the polypeptide melittin is also antigenic. Bumblebee venom appears to be chemically and antigenically related to honeybee venom.

Bees with barbed stingers can often sting other insects without harming themselves. Queen honeybees and bees of many other species, including bumblebees and many solitary bees, have smoother stingers with smaller barbs and can sting mammals repeatedly.

The sting's injection of apitoxin into the victim is accompanied by the release of alarm pheromones, a process which is accelerated if the bee is fatally injured. The release of alarm pheromones near a hive may attract other bees to the location, where they will likewise exhibit defensive behaviors until there is no longer a threat, typically because the victim has either fled or been killed. (Note: A bee swarm, seen as a mass of bees flying or clumped together, is generally not hostile; it has deserted its hive and has no comb or young to defend.) These pheromones do not dissipate or wash off quickly, and if their target enters the water, bees will resume their attack as soon as it leaves the water. The alarm pheromone emitted when a bee stings another animal smells like a banana.

Drone bees, the males, are larger and do not have stingers. The female bees (worker bees and queens) are the only ones that can sting, and their stinger is a modified ovipositor. The queen bee has a barbed but smoother stinger and can, if need be, sting skin-bearing creatures multiple times, but the queen does not leave the hive under normal conditions. Her sting is not for the defense of the hive; she only uses it for dispatching rival queens, ideally before they can emerge from their cells. Queen breeders who handle multiple queens and have the queen odor on their hands are sometimes stung by a queen.

The stinger consists of three parts: a stylus and two barbed slides (or lancets), one on either side of the stylus. The bee does not push the stinger in but it is drawn in by the barbed slides. The slides move alternately up and down the stylus so when the barb of one slide has caught and retracts, it pulls the stylus and the other barbed slide into the wound. When the other barb has caught, it also retracts up the stylus pulling the stinger further in. This process is repeated until the stinger is fully in and even continues after the stinger and its mechanism is detached from the bee's abdomen. When a female honey bee stings a person, it cannot pull the barbed stinger back out, but rather leaves behind not only the stinger, but also part of its abdomen and digestive tract, plus muscles and nerves. This massive abdominal rupture kills the honey bee. Honey bees are the only bees to die after stinging.

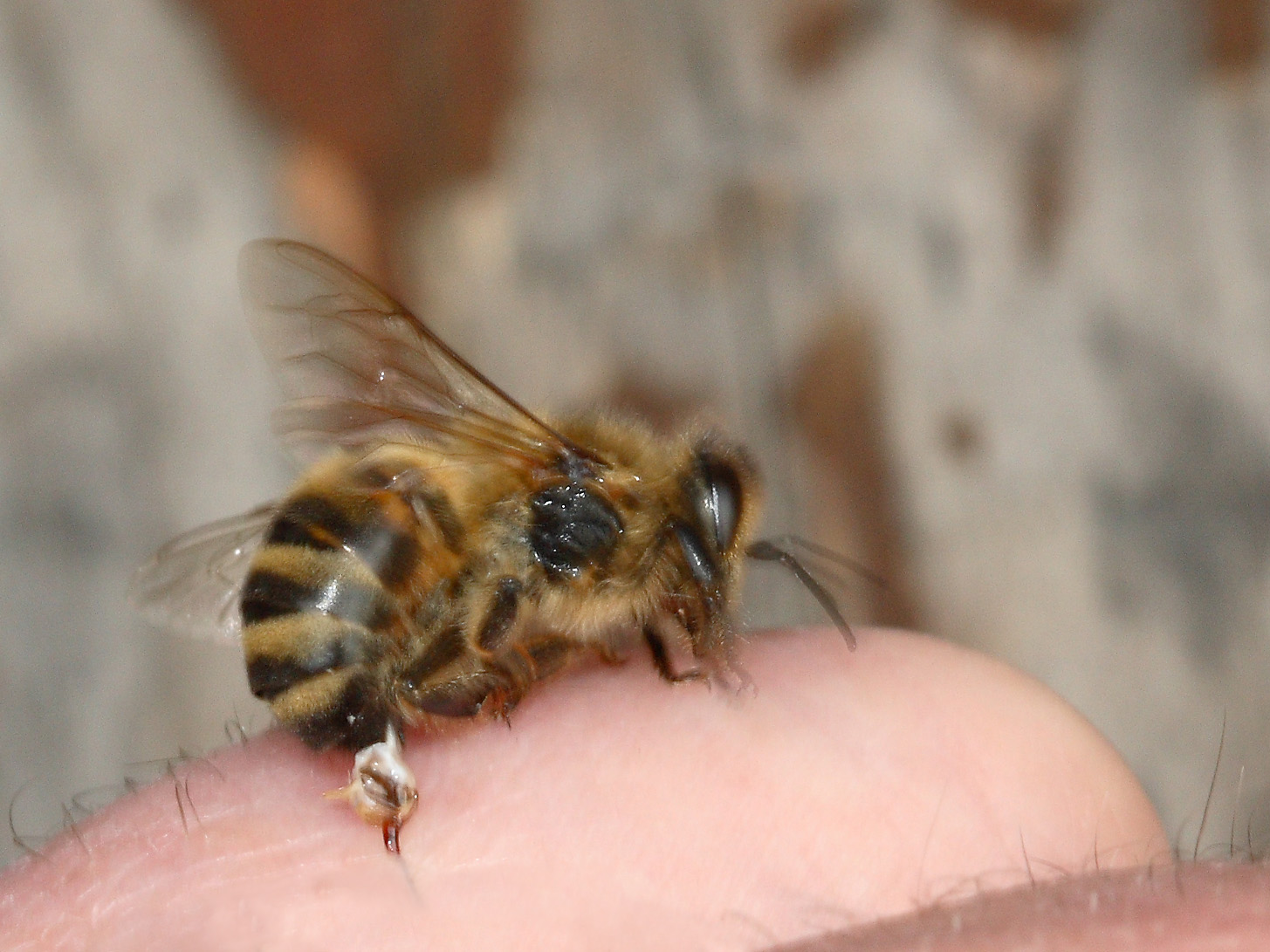
Bee sting. The stinger is torn off and left in the skin.

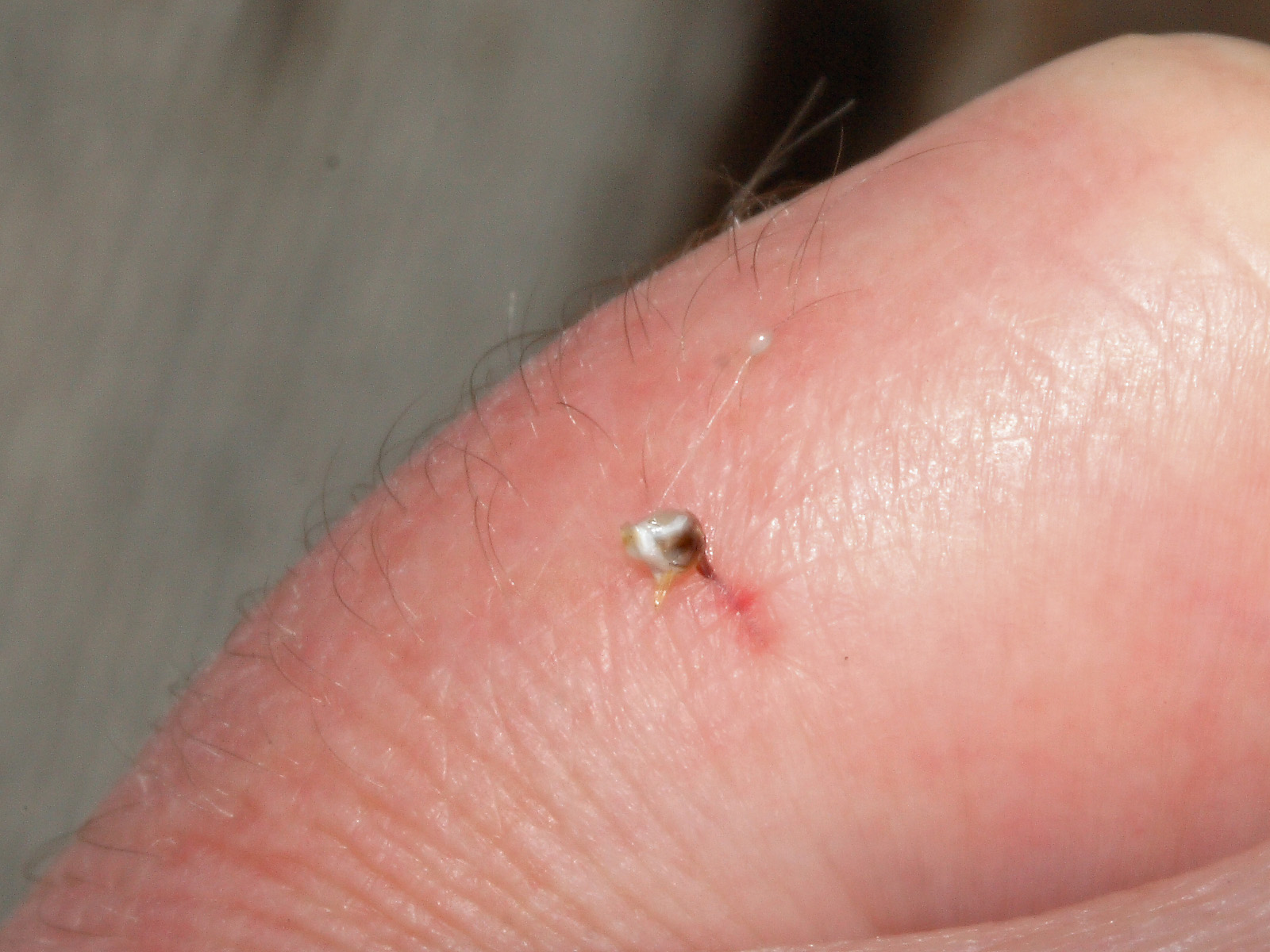
2 minutes later

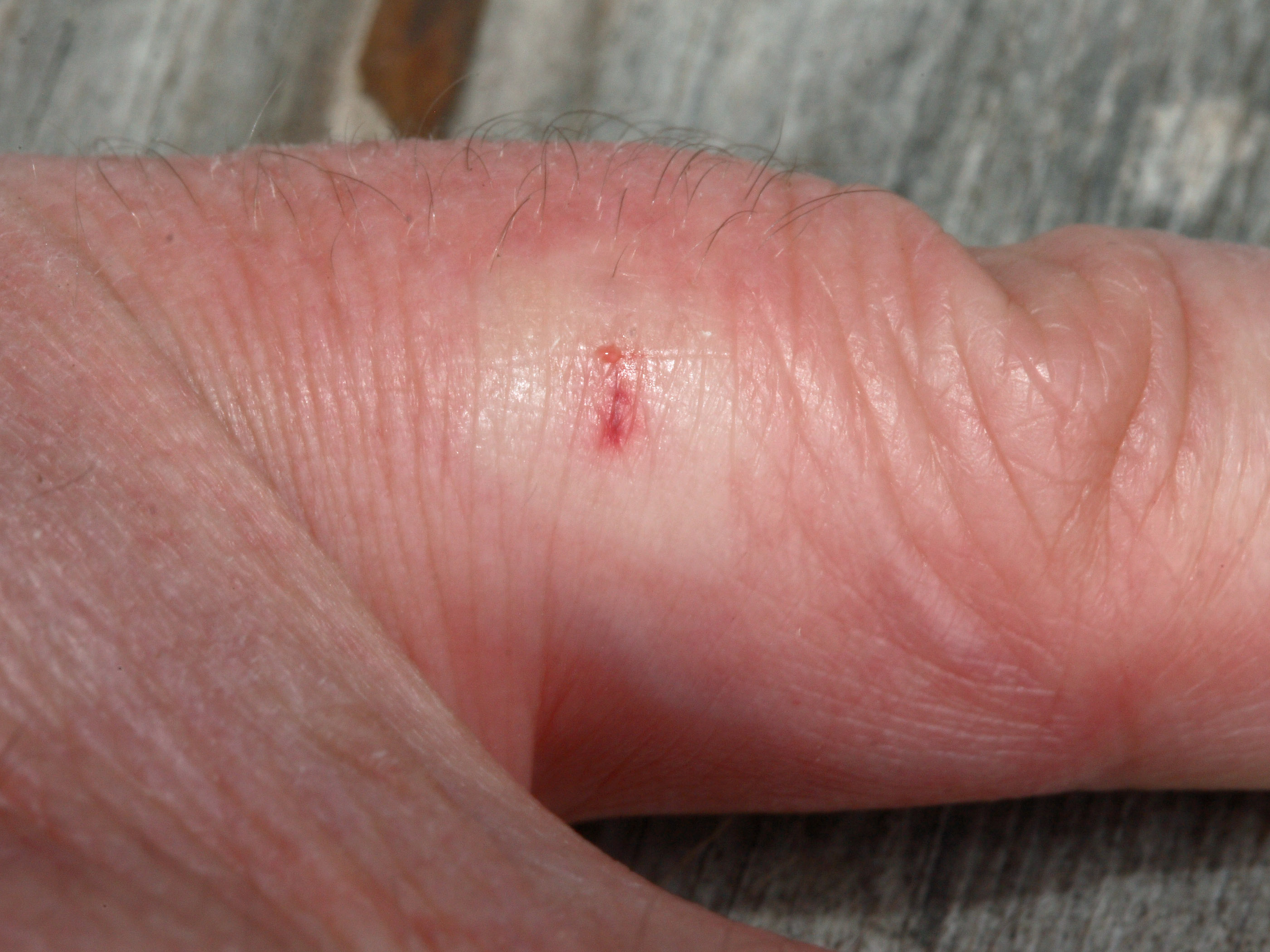
6 minutes later, after the stinger has been removed

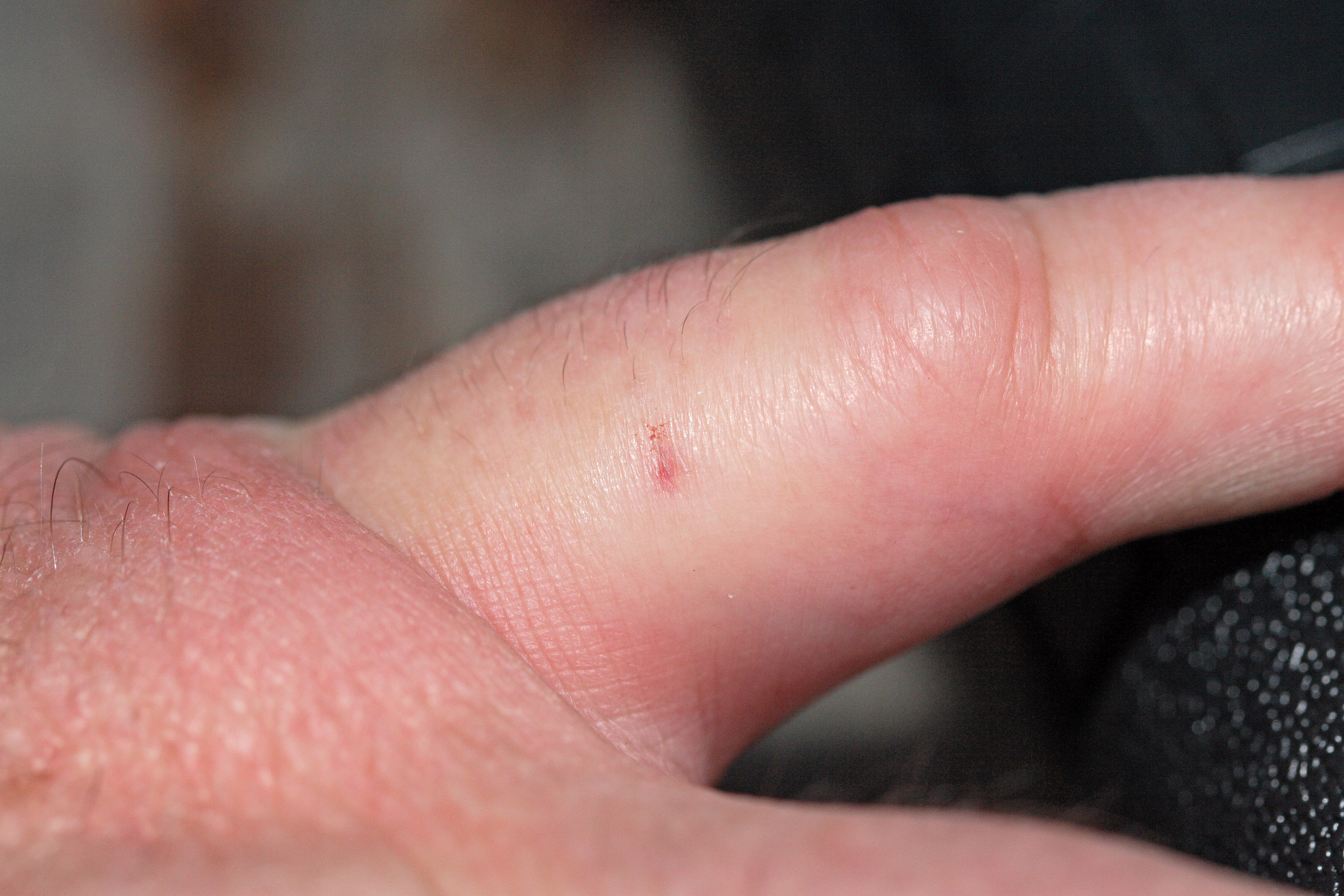
27 minutes later

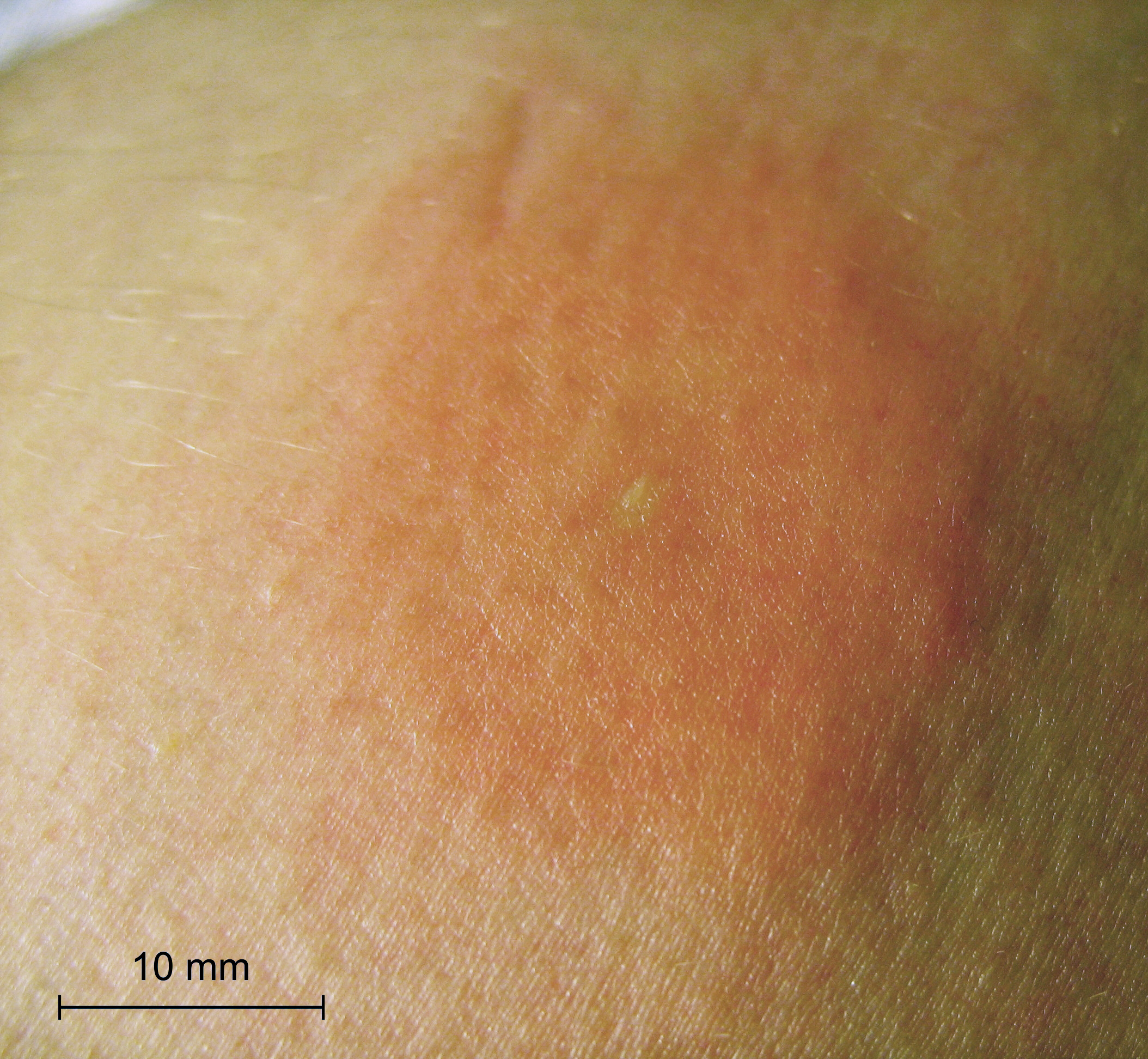
A bee sting 1 day after

== Venom and apitherapy ==
The main component of bee venom responsible for pain in vertebrates is the toxin melittin; histamine and other biogenic amines may also contribute to pain and itching. In one of the alternative medical uses of honey bee products, apitherapy, bee venom has been used to treat arthritis and other painful conditions. All currently available evidence supporting this practice is either anecdotal, animal studies, or preliminary evidence, most of which has poor methodology. Apitherapy is not currently accepted as a viable medical treatment for any condition or disease; the risk of allergic reaction and anaphylaxis outweighs any benefits. According to the American Cancer Society, there is no scientific evidence that apitherapy or bee venom therapy can treat or change the course of cancer or any other disease. Clinical trials have shown that apitherapy is ineffective in treating multiple sclerosis or any other disease, and can exacerbate multiple sclerosis symptoms.

== Treatment ==
The first step in treatment following a honey bee sting is removal of the stinger itself. The stinger should be removed as quickly as possible without regard to method: a study has shown the amount of venom delivered does not differ whether the sting is pinched or scraped off and even a delay of a few seconds leads to more venom being injected. Once the stinger is removed, pain and swelling should be reduced with a cold compress. A topical anesthetic containing benzocaine will relieve pain quickly and menthol is an effective anti-itch treatment. Itching can also be relieved by antihistamine or by a topical steroid cream.

Many traditional remedies have been suggested for bee stings. No interventions have been proven to be effective in scientific studies and a randomized trial of aspirin paste and topical ice packs showed that aspirin was not effective in reducing the duration of swelling or pain in bee and wasp stings, and significantly increased the duration of redness. The study concluded that ice alone is a better treatment for bee and wasp stings than aspirin.

For about 2 percent of people, a hypersensitivity can develop after being stung, creating a more severe reaction. This sensitisation may happen after a single sting, or after a series of stings. An allergic person may suffer anaphylactic shock from certain proteins in the venom, which can be life-threatening and requires emergency treatment. People known to be highly allergic may carry around epinephrine (adrenaline) in the form of a self-injectable EpiPen for the treatment of an anaphylactic shock. For people who experience severe or life-threatening reactions to insect stings, allergy injections composed of increasing concentrations of naturally occurring venom may provide protection against future insect stings.

== See also ==
- Apitoxin
- Bee venom therapy
- Characteristics of common wasps and bees
- Fear of bees (apiphobia)
- Fear of wasps (spheksophobia)
- Hornet stings
- Schmidt sting pain index
- Topical tobacco paste
