= Vasily Krylov =

Russian biologist

Vasily Nikolayevich Krylov
- Born: January 2, 1947
- Died: February 17, 2018 (aged 71)
- Education: N. I. Lobachevsky State University of Nizhny Novgorod
- Known for: Apitherapy
- Awards: Honored Scientist of the Russian Federation (2007); Honoured Worker of Higher Professional Education of the Russian Federation; 2016 Nizhny Novgorod Prize
- Scientific career
- Fields: biology
- Workplaces: N. I. Lobachevsky State University of Nizhny Novgorod
- Academic advisors: Nikolay Artemov

External image
- Professor V. N. Krylov

Vasily Nikolayevich Krylov (Russian: Василий Николаевич Крылов; January 2, 1947 – February 17, 2018) was a Russian scientist, Doctor of Biological Sciences, Distinguished Professor at the N. I. Lobachevsky State University of Nizhny Novgorod (UNN), Chairman (since 1997) of the Russian Apitherapy Coordinating Council, Honored Scientist of the Russian Federation (2007) and Honoured Worker of Higher Professional Education of the Russian Federation. Laureate of the 2016 Nizhny Novgorod Prize. He is known as a bee venom expert.

He graduated from the N. I. Lobachevsky State University of Nizhny Novgorod in 1970. He was a student of Nikolay Artemov.

From 1991 to 2016, Krylov headed the Department of Physiology and Biochemistry of Humans and Animals at the Lobachevsky University (UNN).

Since 1997, he heads the Russian Apitherapy Coordinating Council (under the Ministry of Agriculture).

He is now a professor on Department of Biochemistry and Physiology at the UNN Institute of Biology and Biomedicine and a member of the editorial board of the journal "Pchelovodstvo".

Krylov is the author of 6 monographs and more than 280 scientific articles. He is the author of books (in Russian) including "Bee venom: Properties, reception, application" (1995), "Bee venom in scientific and practical medicine" (2002), "Theory and means of apitherapy" (2007, in cooperation with Academician N. I. Krivtsov, V. I. Lebedev et al.), "Zootoxinology" (2015).

== Works ==
Monographs

- Крылов В. Н. Пчелиный яд. Свойства, получение, применение: научно-справочное издание. — Нижний Новгород: Изд-во ННГУ им. Н. И. Лобачевского. 1995. 224 с.
- Трошин В. Д., Крылов В. Н., Ковалева Т. С., Бачина О. В. Кладезь здоровья. Опыт народной и научной медицины: научно-справочное издание (монография). Нижний Новгород: Изд-во НГМА, 1995. 308 с.
- Крылов В. Н., Сокольский С. С. Пчелиный кладезь здоровья: научно-справочное издание. Краснодар: Изд-во администрации Краснодарского края, 1999. 92 с.
- Кривцов Н. И. Продукты пчеловодства для здоровья / Н. И. Кривцов, В. Н. Крылов, В. И. Лебедев, С. С. Сокольский. Краснодар: «Агропромполиграфист», 2002. 272 с.
- Пчелиный яд в научной и практической медицине / В. Н. Крылов, В. П. Млявый; [Редкол.: В. С. Улащик (пред.) и др.]. Минск: УП «Технопринт», 2002. 264 с. ISBN 985-464-435-9
- Теория и средства апитерапии / Крылов В. Н., Агафонов А. В., Кривцов Н. И., Лебедев В. И., Бурмистрова Л. А., Ошевенский Л. В., Сокольский С. С.; Рос. акад. с.-х. наук, НИИ пчеловодства, М-во образования и науки Рос. Федерации, Нижегор. гос. ун-т им. Н. И. Лобачевского. - Москва : Комильфо, 2007. - 295 с. - ISBN 978-5-903535-03-3

In English

- Krylov V.N., Sokolsky S.S. Experimental study of bee royal jelly cardioprotectiv characteristics // Mellifera. 2006. N 6. P. 28–32.
- Antipenko E.A., Deriugina A.V., Talamanova M.N., Krylov V.N., Troshin V.D. Efficiency of Apitherapy in the Treatment of Neurological Patients // Journal of the American Apitherapy Society. V 22, N 2015. P. 1, 4–6.
- Krylov V.N., Deriugina A.V., Pleskova S.N., Kalinin V.A. Apoptotic nature of erythrocyte hemolysis induced by low doses of ionizing radiation // Biophysics. 2015. Т. 60. No. 1. С. 79–84.

Other

- In memory of Nikolai Mikhailovich Artemov / Krylov V.N., Zeveke A.V., Irzhak L.I. (in Russian) // Российский физиологический журнал им. И. М. Сеченова. - 2006. - Т. 92, N 6. - С. 771.
