= Bodog F. Beck =

American physician

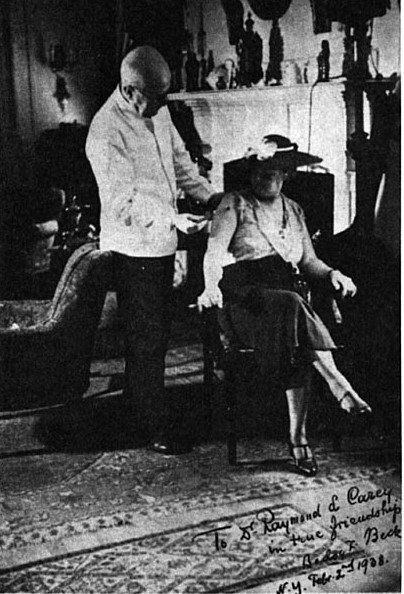
- Beck treating a patient
- Born: Bodog Felix Beck; 6 August 1868; Baja
- Died: 1 January 1942 (aged 73)
- Occupation: Physician
- Spouse: Anna Eleonore Krender (m. 1906)

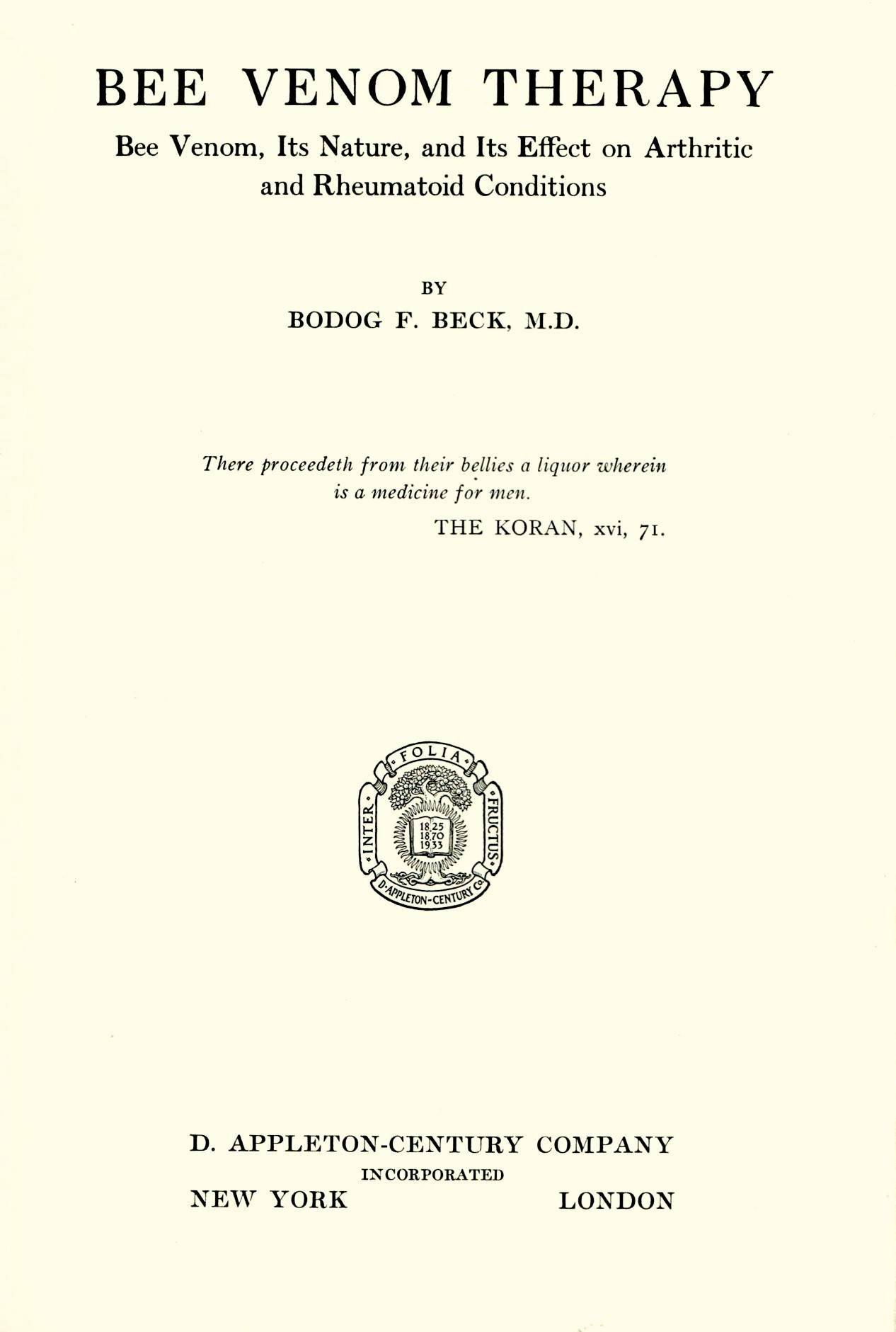
The title page of Beck's Bee Venom Therapy, 1935.

Bodog Felix Beck (6 August 1868 – 1 January 1942) was a Hungarian-born American physician who specialized in the treatment of arthritic and rheumatoid conditions using bee venom and who coined the term "bee venom therapy". There are no studies proving the ability of bee venom to cure any ailment.

== Early life ==
Bodog Beck was born in Baja, Hungary, on 6 August 1868, the son of Samu Beck and Rosalie Kuhn. As a boy, he kept bees, which engendered a lifelong interest in apiculture. He received his medical degree from the University of Budapest in 1892. According to the beekeeper Charles Mraz, who met Beck in 1935, he had served in the Austro-Hungarian Army. He married Anna Eleonore Krender in 1906.

== Career ==
By 1902, Beck was living and practicing as a medical doctor in the United States.

In 1912 he sued the estate of the late Mary A. Mason of New York and Great Barrington for fees of $7,000 for medical treatment given in 1909 and 1910. He was supported by the testimony of Dr. Caesar A. von Ramdohr, who said that any fee from $5,000 to $10,000 would be a fair fee for a doctor of Beck's standing. He was naturalized as an American citizen in 1919.

He was on the staff of St. Mark's Hospital for many years and also in private practice at 116 East 58th Street between Park and Lexington Avenues in New York City. He specialized in the treatment of arthritic and rheumatoid conditions using bee venom and coined the term "bee venom therapy" which he described in his book Bee venom therapy: Bee venom, its nature, and its effect on arthritic and rheumatoid conditions (1935). In 1938 he produced Honey and health: A nutrimental, medicinal and historical commentary.

In 1937, The Coshocton Tribune reported that at the beekeepers' conference in Washington, D.C., Beck explained his discovery. After a series of experiments, he said, he had discovered that arthritis was caused by suboxidation, the lack of oxygen in the bloodstream, and that the venom from the sting of a bee entering the bloodstream gave off ultraviolet rays that provided oxygen to diseased tissue. He used from 20 to 75 or 100 bee stings per patient, from bees bred in his own hives outside his office specially for the purpose. He stated that arthritic patients were almost immune to the pain of the sting.

Beck died in Kingston, New York, on 1 January 1942, at the age of 73. His books have been reprinted since his death under new titles, Bee Venom Therapy as The Bible of Bee Venom Therapy, and Honey and Health in a revised edition as Honey and Your Health with Dorée Smedley.

== Reception ==
Beck's book Bee Venom Therapy was negatively reviewed in the Journal of the American Medical Association in 1935. The review commented that "this book fails in its purpose of advancing the use of bee venom because most of the evidence is uncritical... It is an interesting book from the historical aspect, has an extensive bibliography and is written in good style, but it is not a contribution to scientific medical literature."

Biologist H. Bentley Glass praised Beck's Honey and Your Health for collecting "an immense amount of entertaining lore about honey" but criticized it for making uncritical health claims. He noted that it is an "interesting and useful compilation of lore about honey, but biologically it is uncritical, not to say unsound, and omits the central biological story of honey almost entirely."

There are no studies proving the ability of bee venom to cure any ailment.

== Selected publications ==
- Bee Venom Therapy: Bee Venom, Its Nature, and Its Effect on Arthritic and Rheumatoid Conditions. D. Appleton-Century Company, New York, 1935. (Reprinted as The Bible of Bee Venom Therapy, Health Resources Press, 1997.)
- Honey and Health: A Nutrimental, Medicinal and Historical Commentary. Robert M. McBride, New York, 1938.
- Honey and Your Health: A Nutrimental, Medicinal & Historical Commentary. Museum Press, London, 1947. (Revised by Dorée Smedley)
