= Nikolay Artemov =

- Born: 24 January 1908; Tula, RSFSR, Soviet Union
- Died: 2 December 2005 (aged 97)
- Education: Moscow State University (1931)
- Known for: Scientific Apitherapy, Zootoxinology
- Awards: Honorary Professor, UNN; Honorary Soros Professor; Medals of VDNKh
- Scientific career
- Fields: Physiology
- Workplaces: N. I. Lobachevsky State University of Nizhny Novgorod
- Academic advisors: Khachatour Koshtoyants
- Notable students: Zeveke A.V., Shamil Omarov, Vasily Krylov, Boris Orlov, David Gelashvili

Nikolai Mikhaylovich Artemov (Russian: Николай Михайлович Артёмов; 24 January 1908 – 2 December 2005) was a Soviet Russian physiologist, Doktor Nauk in Biological Sciences (1969), Honorary Professor at the N. I. Lobachevsky State University of Nizhny Novgorod. He is known as the founder of scientific apitherapy. In 1957, the USSR Ministry of Health sanctioned the use of bee venom in the treatment of certain ailments. It was the "Instruction for Bee Sting Venom Apitherapy" by N.M. Artemov (with Prof. G. P. Zaytsev from 2nd MSMI), who authored the document.

== Career ==
He graduated from the Department of Physiology at the faculty of biology of the Lomonosov Moscow State University in 1931.

From 1936 to 1941, he work at the Severtsov Institute of Ecology and Evolution of the Russian Academy of Sciences.

From 1943 to 1974, Artemov headed the Department of Physiology and Biochemistry of Humans and Animals at the N. I. Lobachevsky State University of Nizhny Novgorod.

From 1969 to 1975, Artemov served as Vice-president of the Standing Commission on Apiculture Products Apimondia.

In 1971, Artemov headed the first organized symposium on apitherapy at the Congress of Apimondia.

He was appointed Honorary Soros Professor. Among his famous students were Zeveke A.V., Shamil Omarov, Vasily Krylov, Boris Orlov, David Gelashvili.

Artemov is the author about 200 scientific articles and more than 2 monographs. In 1941, his monograph "Bee venom, its physiological properties and therapeutic use" was published by the USSR Academy of Sciences.

He is the author, with Dmitry Sukharev, of the biography of Khachatour Koshtoyants.

== Works ==
- N. M. Artemov, V. P. Lapin. Bee Venom (in Russian) // Big Medical Encyclopedia
- Instruction for Bee Sting Venom Apitherapy (in Russian). Approved by the Academic Medical Council of the USSR Ministry of Health (March 10, 1959)
- NM Artemov, BN Orlov. New data on the scientific argumentation of the physiology of application of bee venom as a medicine // Apiacta 3, 1968
