= Ramdohr =

Ramdohr is a surname. Notable people with the name include:

- Basilius von Ramdohr (1757–1822), German lawyer, art critic and journalist
- Caesar A. von Ramdohr (died 1913), American obstetrician and emeritus professor of the New York Post-Graduate Medical School
- Lilo Ramdohr (1913–2013), German anti-fascist and member of the Munich branch of the student resistance group White Rose in Nazi Germany
- Paul Ramdohr (1890–1985), German mineralogist
