= Krivtsov =

Krivtsov (Russian: Кривцов) is a Russian masculine surname originating from the adjective krivoi, meaning bent; its feminine counterpart is Krivtsova. It may refer to

- Dmytro Krivtsov (born 1985), Ukrainian road bicycle racer
- Larisa Krivtsova (born 1949), Russian journalist, producer and media personality
- Nikolay Krivtsov (1945–2011), was a Russian agricultural scientist
- Sasha Krivtsov (born 1967), Russian bass guitar player
- Stefan Krivtsov (1885–1943), Russian historian and cultural activist
- Vladimir Krivtsov (born 1952), Russian swimmer
- Yuriy Krivtsov (born 1979), French road bicycle racer, brother of Dmytro
