= Arłou =

Arłou, feminine: Arłova is a Belarusian surname, a counterpart of the Russian Orlov/Orlova. Notable people with the surname include:

- Uładzimir Arłou (born 1953), Belarusian historian, writer, politician, and poet
- Uładzimir Arłou (film director) (born 1938), Belarusian film director, screenwriter, and writer
