= Apamin =

Identifiers
| CAS Number | 24345-16-2 |
| 3D model (JSmol) | Interactive image |
| ChEMBL | ChEMBL525408 |
| ChemSpider | 23975893 |
| ECHA InfoCard | 100.041.969 |
| EC Number | 246-182-7 |
| IUPHAR/BPS | 2311 |
| PubChem CID | 16129677 |
| UNII | X644P85KUR |
| CompTox Dashboard (EPA) | DTXSID70897227 |
- InChI: InChI=1S/C79H131N31O24S4/c1-35(2)26-49-70(127)107-51-31-136-135-30-41(81)63(120)105-50(28-57(84)114)71(128)108-53(73(130)99-42(12-7-8-22-80)64(121)96-38(5)77(134)110-25-11-15-54(110)75(132)102-47(18-21-58(115)116)69(126)109-59(39(6)111)76(133)95-37(4)62(119)104-49)33-138-137-32-52(106-66(123)44(14-10-24-92-79(88)89)98-65(122)43(13-9-23-91-78(86)87)97-61(118)36(3)94-72(51)129)74(131)101-45(16-19-55(82)112)67(124)100-46(17-20-56(83)113)68(125)103-48(60(85)117)27-40-29-90-34-93-40/h29,34-39,41-54,59,111H,7-28,30-33,80-81H2,1-6H3,(H2,82,112)(H2,83,113)(H2,84,114)(H2,85,117)(H,90,93)(H,94,129)(H,95,133)(H,96,121)(H,97,118)(H,98,122)(H,99,130)(H,100,124)(H,101,131)(H,102,132)(H,103,125)(H,104,119)(H,105,120)(H,106,123)(H,107,127)(H,108,128)(H,109,126)(H,115,116)(H4,86,87,91)(H4,88,89,92)/t36?,37-,38-,39+,41-,42-,43-,44?,45-,46-,47-,48-,49-,50-,51-,52-,53-,54-,59?/m0/s1 Key: YVIIHEKJCKCXOB-WNKOHBQLSA-N; InChI=1S/C79H131N31O24S4/c1-35(2)26-49-70(127)107-51-31-136-135-30-41(81)63(120)105-50(28-57(84)114)71(128)108-53(73(130)99-42(12-7-8-22-80)64(121)96-38(5)77(134)110-25-11-15-54(110)75(132)102-47(18-21-58(115)116)69(126)109-59(39(6)111)76(133)95-37(4)62(119)104-49)33-138-137-32-52(106-66(123)44(14-10-24-92-79(88)89)98-65(122)43(13-9-23-91-78(86)87)97-61(118)36(3)94-72(51)129)74(131)101-45(16-19-55(82)112)67(124)100-46(17-20-56(83)113)68(125)103-48(60(85)117)27-40-29-90-34-93-40/h29,34-39,41-54,59,111H,7-28,30-33,80-81H2,1-6H3,(H2,82,112)(H2,83,113)(H2,84,114)(H2,85,117)(H,90,93)(H,94,129)(H,95,133)(H,96,121)(H,97,118)(H,98,122)(H,99,130)(H,100,124)(H,101,131)(H,102,132)(H,103,125)(H,104,119)(H,105,120)(H,106,123)(H,107,127)(H,108,128)(H,109,126)(H,115,116)(H4,86,87,91)(H4,88,89,92)/t36?,37-,38-,39+,41-,42-,43-,44?,45-,46-,47-,48-,49-,50-,51-,52-,53-,54-,59?/m0/s1; Key: YVIIHEKJCKCXOB-WNKOHBQLSA-N
- SMILES: C[C@H]1C(=O)N[C@H](C(=O)N[C@H](C(=O)N[C@@H](CSSC[C@H]2C(=O)N[C@H](C(=O)N[C@H](C(=O)N3CCC[C@H]3C(=O)N[C@H](C(=O)NC(C(=O)N[C@H](C(=O)N[C@H](C(=O)N[C@@H](CSSC[C@@H](C(=O)N[C@H](C(=O)N2)CC(=O)N)N)C(=O)N1)CC(C)C)C)[C@@H](C)O)CCC(=O)O)C)CCCCN)C(=O)N[C@@H](CCC(=O)N)C(=O)N[C@@H](CCC(=O)N)C(=O)N[C@@H](Cc4cnc[nH]4)C(=O)N)CCCNC(=N)N)CCCNC(=N)N

Properties
| Chemical formula | C_{79}H_{131}N_{31}O_{24}S_{4} |
| Molar mass | 2027.33874 g/mol |
- Except where otherwise noted, data are given for materials in their standard state (at 25 °C [77 °F], 100 kPa). verify (what is ?) Infobox references

Apamin Preproprotein

Identifiers
- Symbol: Apamin
- CAS number: 24345-16-2
- NCBI gene: 406135
- UniProt: P01500
Search for
- Structures: Swiss-model
- Domains: InterPro

Apamin is an 18 amino acid globular peptide neurotoxin found in apitoxin (bee venom). Dry bee venom consists of 2–3% of apamin. Apamin selectively blocks SK channels, a type of Ca^{2+}-activated K^{+} channel expressed in the central nervous system. Toxicity is caused by only a few amino acids, in particular cysteine_{1}, lysine_{4}, arginine_{13}, arginine_{14} and histidine_{18}. These amino acids are involved in the binding of apamin to the Ca^{2+}-activated K^{+} channel. Due to its specificity for SK channels, apamin is used as a drug in biomedical research to study the electrical properties of SK channels and their role in the afterhyperpolarizations occurring immediately following an action potential.

== Origin ==
The first symptoms of apitoxin (bee venom), that are now thought to be caused by apamin, were described back in 1936 by Hahn and Leditschke. Apamin was first isolated by Habermann in 1965 from Apis mellifera, the Western honey bee. Apamin was named after this bee. Bee venom contains many other compounds, like histamine, phospholipase A2, hyaluronidase, MCD peptide, and the main active component melittin. Apamin was separated from the other compounds by gel filtration and ion exchange chromatography.

== Structure and active site ==
Apamin is a polypeptide possessing an amino acid sequence of H-Cys-Asn-Cys-Lys-Ala-Pro-Glu-Thr-Ala-Leu-Cys-Ala-Arg-Arg-Cys-Gln-Gln-His-NH_{2} (one-letter sequence CNCKAPETALCARRCQQH-NH_{2}, with disulfide bonds between Cys_{1}-Cys_{11} and Cys_{3}-Cys_{15}). Apamin is very rigid because of the two disulfide bridges and seven hydrogen bonds. The three-dimensional structure of apamin has been studied with several spectroscopical techniques: HNMR, Circular Dichroism, Raman spectroscopy, FT-IR. The structure is presumed to consist of an alpha-helix and beta-turns, but the exact structure is still unknown.

By local alterations it is possible to find the amino acids that are involved in toxicity of apamin. It was found by Vincent et al. that guanidination of the ε-amino group of lysine_{4} does not decrease toxicity. When the ε-amino group of lysine_{4} and the α-amino group of cysteine_{1} are acetylated or treated with fluorescamine, toxicity decreases with a factor of respectively 2.5 and 2.8. This is only a small decrease, which indicates that neither the ε-amino group of lysine_{4} nor the α-amino group of cysteine_{1} is essential for the toxicity of apamin. Glutamine_{7} was altered by formation of an amide bond with glycine ethyl ester, this resulted in a decrease in toxicity of a factor 2.0. Glutamine_{7} also doesn't appear to be essential for toxicity. When histidine_{18} is altered by carbethoxylation, toxicity decreases only by a factor 2.6. But when histidine_{18}, the ε-amino group of lysine_{4} and the α-amino group of cysteine_{1} all are carbethoxylated and acetylated toxicity decreases drastically. This means that these three amino acids are not essential for toxicity on their own, but the three of them combined are. Chemical alteration of arginine_{13} and arginine_{14} by treatment of 1,2-cyclohexanedione and cleavage by trypsin decreases toxicity by a factor greater than 10. The amino acids that cause toxicity of apamin are cysteine_{1}, lysine_{4}, arginine_{13}, arginine_{14} and histidine_{18}.

== Toxicodynamics ==
Apamin is the smallest neurotoxin polypeptide known, and the only one that passes the blood-brain barrier. Apamin thus reaches its target organ, the central nervous system. Here it inhibits small-conductance Ca^{2+}-activated K^{+} channels (SK channels) in neurons. These channels are responsible for the afterhyperpolarizations that follow action potentials, and therefore regulate the repetitive firing frequency. Three different types of SK channels show different characteristics. Only SK2 and SK3 are blocked by apamin, whereas SK1 is apamin insensitive. SK channels function as a tetramer of subunits. Heteromers have intermediate sensitivity. SK channels are activated by the binding of intracellular Ca^{2+} to the protein calmodulin, which is constitutively associated to the channel. Transport of potassium ions out of the cell along their concentration gradient causes the membrane potential to become more negative. The SK channels are present in a wide range of excitable and non-excitable cells, including cells in the central nervous system, intestinal myocytes, endothelial cells, and hepatocytes.

Binding of apamin to SK channels is mediated by amino acids in the pore region as well as extracellular amino acids of the SK channel. It is likely that the inhibition of SK channels is caused by blocking of the pore region, which hinders the transport of potassium ions. This will increase the neuronal excitability and lower the threshold for generating an action potential. Other toxins that block SK channels are tamapin and scyllatoxin.

== Toxicokinetics ==
The kinetics of labeled derivatives of apamin were studied in vitro and in vivo in mice by Cheng-Raude et al. This shed some light on the kinetics of apamin itself. The key organ for excretion is likely to be the kidney, since enrichment of the labeled derivatives was found there. The peptide apamin is small enough to pass the glomerular barrier, facilitating renal excretion. The central nervous system, contrarily, was found to contain only very small amounts of apamin. This is unexpected, as this is the target organ for neurotoxicity caused by apamin. This low concentration thus appeared to be sufficient to cause the toxic effects.

However, these results disagree with a study of Vincent et al. After injection of a supralethal dose of radioactive acetylated apamin in mice, enrichment was found in the spinal cord, which is part of the target organ. Some other organs, including kidney and brain, contained only small amounts of the apamin derivative.

== Symptoms ==
Symptoms following bee sting may include:

- Local effects: burning or stinging pain, swelling, redness.
- Severe systemic reactions: swelling of the tongue and throat, difficulty breathing, and shock.
- Development of optic neuritis and atrophy.
- Atrial fibrillation, cerebral infarction, acute myocardial infarction, Fisher's syndrome, acute inflammatory polyradiculopathy (Guillain–Barré syndrome), claw hand (through a central action of apamin on the spinal cord and a peripheral action in the form of median and ulnar neuritis, causing spasms of the long flexors in the forearm).

Patients poisoned with bee venom can be treated with anti-inflammatory medication, antihistamines and oral prednisolone.

Apamin is an element in bee venom. A person can come into contact with apamin through bee venom, so the symptoms that are known are not caused by apamin directly, but by the venom as a whole. Apamin is the only neurotoxin acting purely on the central nervous system. The symptoms of apamin toxicity are not well known, because people are not easily exposed to the toxin alone.

Through research about the neurotoxicity of apamin some symptoms were discovered. In mice, the injection of apamin produces convulsions and long-lasting spinal spasticity. Also, it is known that the polysynaptic spinal reflexes are disinhibited in cats. Polysynaptic reflex is a reflex action that transfers an impulse from a sensory neuron to a motor neuron via an interneuron in the spinal cord. In rats, apamin was found to cause tremor and ataxia, as well as dramatic haemorrhagic effects in the lungs.

Furthermore, apamin has been found to be 1000 times more efficient when applied into the ventricular system instead of the peripheral nervous system. The ventricular system is a set of structures in the brain containing cerebrospinal fluid. The peripheral nervous system contains the nerves and ganglia outside of the brain and spinal cord. This difference in efficiency can easily be explained. Apamin binds to the SK channels, which differ slightly in different tissues. So apamin binding is probably stronger in SK channels in the ventricular system than in other tissues.

== Toxicity rates ==
In earlier years it was thought that apamin was a rather nontoxic compound (LD_{50} = 15 mg/kg in mice) compared to the other compounds in bee venom. The current lethal dose values of apamin measured in mice are given below. There are no data known specific for humans.

Intraperitoneal (mouse) LD_{50}: 3.8 mg/kg

Subcutaneous (mouse) LD_{50}: 2.9 mg/kg

Intravenous (mouse) LD_{50}: 4 mg/kg

Intracerebral (mouse) LD_{50}: 1800 ng/kg

Parenteral (mouse) LD_{50}: 600 mg/kg

== Therapeutic use ==
Recent studies have shown that SK channels do not only regulate afterhyperpolarization, they also have an effect on synaptic plasticity. This is the activity-dependent adaptation of the strength of synaptic transmission. Synaptic plasticity is an important mechanism underlying learning and memory processes. Apamin is expected to influence these processes by inhibiting SK channels. It has been shown that apamin enhances learning and memory in rats and mice. This may provide a basis for the use of apamin as a treatment for memory disorders and cognitive dysfunction. However, due to the risk of toxic effects, the therapeutic window is very narrow.

SK channel blockers may have a therapeutic effect on Parkinson's disease. Dopamine, which is depleted in this disease, will be released from midbrain dopaminergic neurons when these SK channels are inhibited. SK channels have also been proposed as targets for the treatment of epilepsy, emotional disorders and schizophrenia.
