= Aleksandr Orlov =

Aleksandr Orlov, Alexander Orlov or Alexandre Orloff is the name of the following people:

- Aleksander Orlov (1873–1948), Russian opera conductor
- Aleksandr Orlov (astronomer) (1880–1954), Russian astronomer
- Alexander Orlov (ballet), dancer with the Ballets Russes, portrayed the Moor in the 1911 premiere of Petrushka (ballet)
- Alexander Orlov (Soviet defector) (1895–1973), Soviet intelligence officer and defector
- Alexandre Orloff (1899–1979), Russian artist
- Aleksandr Orlov (diplomat) (1907–1969), a Soviet party official and diplomat
- Alexander Sergeyevich Orlov (born in 1930s), Russian historian
- Aleksandr Sergeyevich Orlov (filmmaker) (born 1940), Soviet and Russian actor, film director and screenwriter
- Alexander Konstantinovich Orlov (diplomat) (born 1948), Ambassador of the Russian Federation to France from 2008 to 2017
- Alexander-Ali Orloff (born 1969), second son of Princess Fadia of Egypt, daughter of the deposed King Farouk of Egypt
- Aleksandr Valeryevich Orlov (born 1981), Russian athlete
- Aleksandr Orlov (curler) (born 1983), Russian curler and coach

Aleksandr Orlov is the name of this fictional character:

- Aleksandr Orlov, an anthropomorphic meerkat character from the Compare the Meerkat advertising campaign
