= Dmitry Sukharev (biologist) =

Soviet and Russian biologist and poet (1930–2024)

- Дмитрий Сухарев
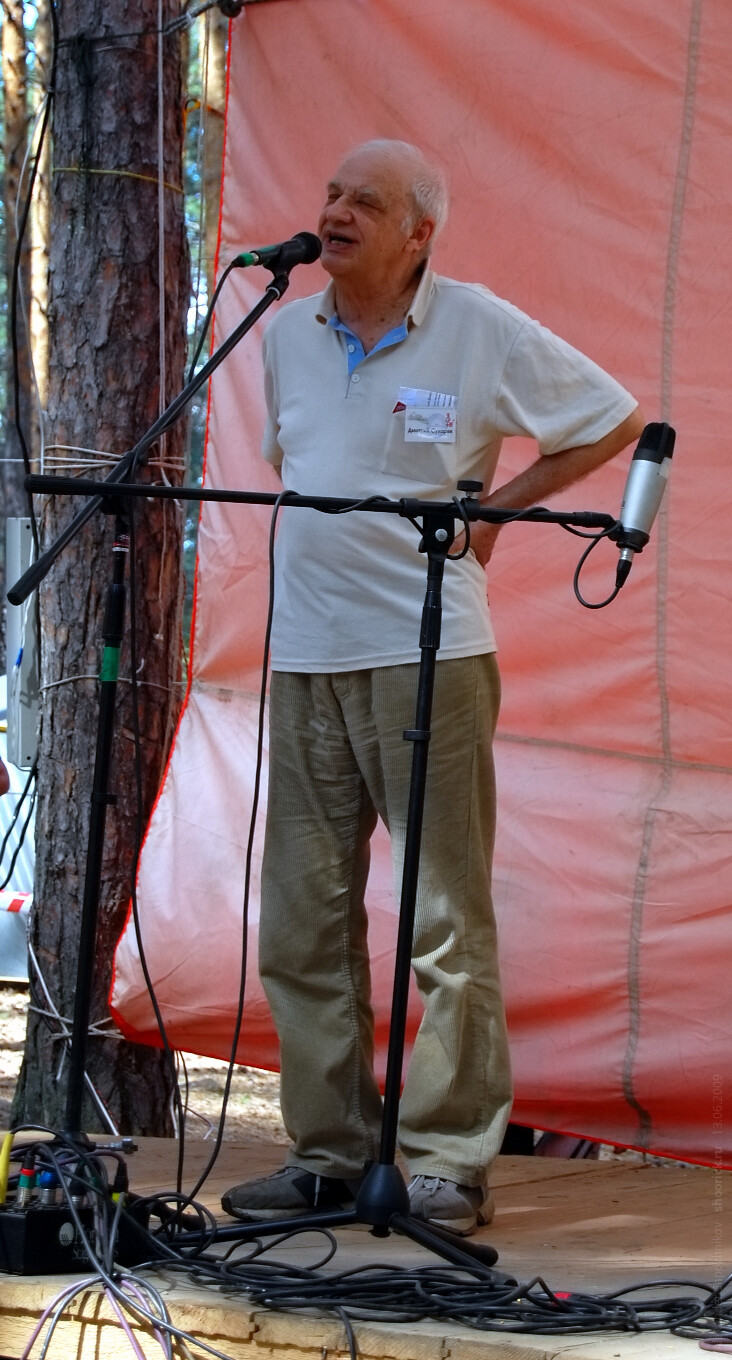
- Sukharev in 2009
- Born: Dmitry Antonovich Sakharov; 1 November 1930; Tashkent, Uzbek SSR, USSR
- Died: 11 November 2024 (aged 94); Moscow, Russia

Dmitry Antonovich Sukharev (Russian: Дми́трий Анто́нович Су́харев; 1 November 1930 – 11 November 2024) was a Soviet and Russian biologist, poet, and bard. He died on 11 November 2024, at the age of 94.

He is the author, with Nikolay Artemov, of the biography of Khachatour Koshtoyants.

== Awards and honors ==
- Medal of the Order "For Merit to the Fatherland" II degree (12 October 2022) for a great contribution to the development of science and many years of conscientious work
- Bulat Okudzhava State Prize (25 April 2001)
