= Eduard Ludyansky =

Eduard Averyanovich Ludyansky
- Born: September 29, 1931
- Died: November 1, 1995 (aged 64)
- Education: Izhevsk State Medical Academy
- Known for: Neurology, Acupuncture & Apitherapy
- Awards: Russian Award for Excellence in Health Care
- Scientific career
- Fields: Neurology
- Workplaces: Vologda Regional Hospital

Eduard Averyanovich Ludyansky (Russian: Эдуард Аверьянович Лудянский; 29 September 1931 – 1 November 1995) was a Russian neurologist, acupuncturist, and apitherapist, Doctor of Medical Sciences and Doctor of the Highest Category. Guide to Apitherapy (1994) is his most famous book.

He graduated with honors from the Izhevsk State Medical Academy in 1954. In 1958 he studied at the Kazan State Medical Academy.

From 1962 he was head of the Department of Neurology at the Vologda Regional Hospital. From 1962 to 1992, Ludyansky held the position of Chief Neurologist of the Vologda Oblast. In 1975, he defended his Candidat thesis.

From 1990 he was a Member of the Board of the All-Russian Society of Neurologists. In 1995, he defended his doctoral thesis about apitherapy in neurology.

He received the Russian Award for Excellence in Health Care.

== Monographs ==
- Ludyansky E. A. Apitherapy. Vologda, 1994. 462 p. (in Russian)
