= Boris Orlov (biologist) =

Soviet Russian biologist

Boris Nikolayevich Orlov
- Born: September 2, 1935; Nizhny Novgorod
- Died: 2012
- Education: N. I. Lobachevsky State University of Nizhny Novgorod
- Known for: Zootoxinology, Apitherapy
- Awards: Honored Scientist of the Russian Federation; Honorary Worker of Higher Professional Education of the Russian Federation; Medal "Veteran of Labour"; Honoured Inventor of the USSR
- Scientific career
- Fields: Biology
- Workplaces: Nizhny Novgorod State Agriculture Academy; N. I. Lobachevsky State University of Nizhny Novgorod
- Academic advisors: Nikolay Artemov, Khachatour Koshtoyants

Boris Nikolayevich Orlov (Russian: Борис Николаевич Орлов; 2 September 1935, in Nizhny Novgorod – 2012) was a Soviet Russian biologist, Doctor of Biological Sciences, Honored Scientist of the Russian Federation and Honorary Worker of Higher Professional Education of the Russian Federation, Academician of the European Academy of Natural Sciences. He was a professor at the Nizhny Novgorod State Agriculture Academy and at the N. I. Lobachevsky State University of Nizhny Novgorod.

He graduated with honors from the Faculty of Biology of the N. I. Lobachevsky State University of Nizhny Novgorod in 1960. He was a student of Nikolay Artemov.

From 1968 to 1971, Orlov served as the Dean of the Faculty of Biology of the N. I. Lobachevsky State University of Nizhny Novgorod.

In 1972, he defended his doctoral thesis.

From 1974 to 1989, Orlov headed the Department of Physiology and Biochemistry of Humans and Animals at the N. I. Lobachevsky State University of Nizhny Novgorod.

From 1988 to 2012, Orlov headed the Department of Physiology and Biochemistry of Animals at the Nizhny Novgorod State Agriculture Academy.

Orlov is the author 400 published scientific works including 20 monographs and textbooks.

== Works ==
- BN Orlov et al. Chemistry and Pharmacology of Bee Venom (A Review of the Literature) // Farmakol Toksikol 41 (3), 358-369. May-Jun 1978.
