= Horrilysin =

Identifiers
- EC no.: 3.4.24.47
- CAS no.: 84056-81-5

Databases
- IntEnz: IntEnz view
- BRENDA: BRENDA entry
- ExPASy: NiceZyme view
- KEGG: KEGG entry
- MetaCyc: metabolic pathway
- PRIAM: profile
- PDB structures: RCSB PDB PDBe PDBsum
Search
- PMC: articles
- PubMed: articles
- NCBI: proteins

Horrilysin (EC 3.4.24.47, Crotalus horridus metalloendopeptidase, hemorrhagic proteinase IV, Crotalus horridus horridus venom hemorrhagic proteinase) is an enzyme. This enzyme catalyses the following chemical reaction

Cleavage of only the single bond Ala^{14}-Leu in the insulin B chain, Ser^{12}-Leu in the A chain, and Ile-Gly, Pro-Ala, and Ser-Trp in melittin

This endopeptidase is present in the venom of the timber rattlesnake (Crotalus horridus horridus)
