= Svetlana Orlova =

Svetlana Orlova (Russian: Светлана Орлова) may refer to:

- Svetlana Nikolayevna Orlova (1946−2003), Soviet actress, Punisher (1968 film)
- Svetlana Orlova (actress) (b. 1956), Soviet and Russian actress
- Svetlana Orlova (politician) (b. 1954), Russian politician
- Svetlana Melnikova (b. 1951), née Svetlana Orlova, Soviet athlete
- Svetlana Solo (b. 1970), professional name of Russian artist Svetlana Orlova
