= Alan Hoby =

Alan John Fraser Hoby OBE (1914 – 15 October 2008) was an English sports journalist, broadcaster and author, who was best known for his regular columns from 1949 to 1986 in the Sunday Express, where he became chief sportswriter. During his career he covered seven Olympic Games, six World Cups and 31 Wimbledon championships.

== Early life and career ==
Alan Hoby was born in London in 1914, the son of John Charles James Hoby, Bandmaster of the Royal Marines. He started in journalism at the age of 16 reading proofs in a basement before becoming a junior reporter at the Richmond and Twickenham Times. He moved to The People in the early 1930s and served as a Royal Marine in World War II.

In 1954 he authored One Crowded Hour (Museum Press).

== Sunday Express ==
In 1949 Hoby was recruited by John Junor as sports correspondent for the Sunday Express where he subsequently became chief sportswriter and over the years his regular columns covered a wide range of sports. In 1963 in Louisville, Kentucky he interviewed a young Cassius Clay, prior to Clay defeating Sonny Liston the following year to become WBA and WBC heavyweight champion. Clay predicted that he would become famous as champion and asked Hoby to send him copies of his article in the post, stating "Just address the envelope 'Cassius Clay, USA'.

Hoby became close friends with a number of notable sporting figures such as Stanley Matthews and Matt Busby. He retired from Express Newspapers in 1986 and in the 1986 Birthday Honours was appointed Officer of the Order of the British Empire (OBE) by Queen Elizabeth II for services to journalism.

== Later life and death ==
Twice married, Hoby was a lifelong lover of jazz and was still attending jazz festivals at the age of eighty-nine. He died on 15 October 2008 at a retirement home in Hove, Sussex and was cremated at Mortlake Crematorium in West London.
