= Scyllatoxin =

Scorpion toxin

Scyllatoxin (also leiurotoxin I) is a toxin, from the scorpion Leiurus quinquestriatus hebraeus, which blocks small-conductance Ca^{2+}-activated K^{+} channels. It is named after Scylla, a sea monster from Greek mythology. Charybdotoxin is also found in the venom from the same species of scorpion, and is named after the sea monster Charybdis. In Greek mythology, Scylla and Charybdis lived on rocks on opposing sides of a narrow strait of water.

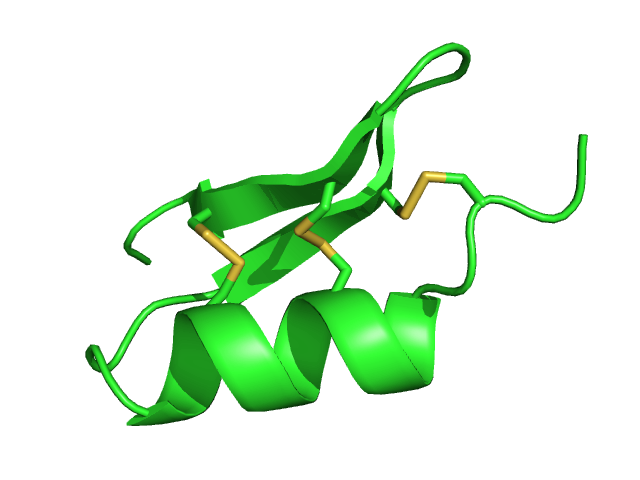
Cartoon diagram of scyllatoxin from PDB entry 1scy disulphide bonded residues are shown as sticks

== Sources ==
Scyllatoxin is one of the components of the venom of the Israeli scorpion ‘Leiurus quinquestriatus hebraeus’. It consists of only 0.02% of the total protein in crude venom.

== Chemistry ==
Leiurotoxin I is a 31-residue peptide (sequence AFCNLRMCQLSCRSLGLLGKCIGDKCECVKH-NH2), with a helix and a short antiparallel β-sheet. This toxin is stabilized by disulfide bonds: Cys8-Cys26 and Cys12-Cys28 is bound to the β-sheet, while Cys3-Cys21 is bound to an N-terminal segment preceding the helix. Leiurotoxin adopts the ά/β motif. Especially the positively charged residues (Arg6 and Arg13, which are located in the ά helix) are important for the expression of toxin biological activities and for its receptor affinity.

== Target ==
Scyllatoxin is a blocker of small-conductance Ca^{2+}– activated K^{+} channels at 10^{−13}–10^{−11} M concentrations in various cell types. This toxin shows similarity in its physiological activity and binding specificity to apamin, but both toxins show no structural similarity.

== Mode of action ==
Scyllatoxin blocks the slow after-hyperpolarization that follows an action potential in some nerve cells.

== Toxicity ==
Scyllatoxin induces spontaneous contractions in guinea pig taenia coli muscle cells that have been relaxed with epinephrine.
