= Boris Orlov =

Boris Orlov may refer to:

- Boris Orlov (biologist) (1935–2012), Russian biologist
- Boris Orlov (coach) (1945–2018), Russian gymnastics coach
