= Anatoly Smirnov (veterinarian) =

Russian scientist (born 1935)

- Born: Anatoly Mikhailovich Smirnov; 5 September 1935 (age 90); Pechenigi, Moscow Oblast, RSFSR, Soviet Union
- Education: Vitebsk State Academy of Veterinary Medicine
- Scientific career
- Fields: Veterinary Sanitation, Hygiene, Ecology, Microbiology
- Workplaces: All-Russian Research Institute for Veterinary Sanitation, Hygiene and Ecology

Anatoly Mikhailovich Smirnov (Russian: Анатолий Михайлович Смирнов; born September 5, 1935, in Moscow Oblast, Soviet Union) is a Russian scientist, Academician of the Russian Academy of Sciences (since 2013), Academician of the Russian Academy of Agricultural Sciences (since 1995), Foreign Member of the National Academy of Agrarian Sciences of Ukraine (since 1995), Academician of the Academy of Agrarian Sciences of Mongolia, Doctor of Veterinary Medicine (Dsc). From 1992 to 2015, he was Director of the All-Russian Research Institute for Veterinary Sanitation, Hygiene and Ecology, Moscow, Russia. In 1987 he received the title of Professor.

He graduated from the Vitebsk State Academy of Veterinary Medicine in 1959.

He is a member of the Editorial Board for Pchelovodstvo.

Smirnov is the author more than 500 scientific works, including 2 monographs.

== Awards and honors ==
- Order of the Red Banner of Labour (1981)
- Honored Scientist of the Russian Federation (1999)
- Order of Honour (2005)
- Medals of VDNKh
