= Kurakin Almshouse =

Wheelchair house

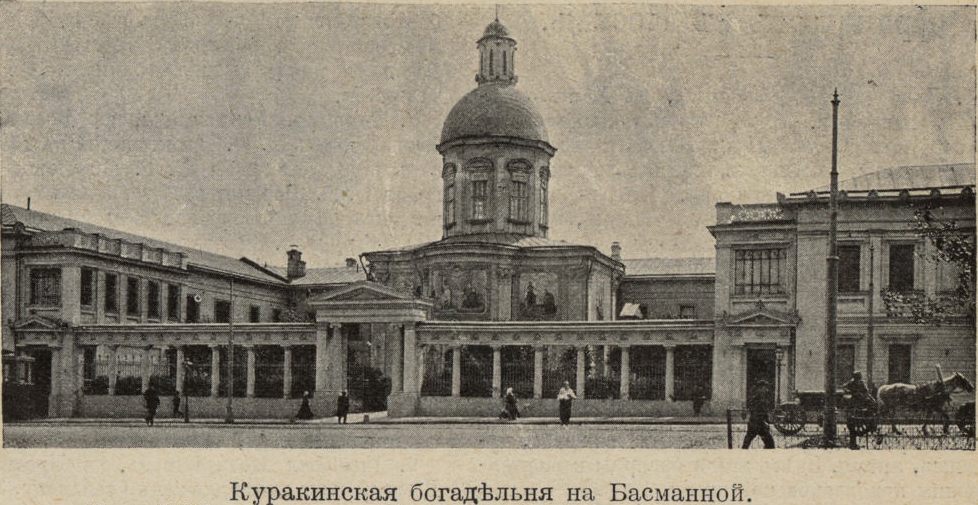
- Kurakin Acceptable House in pre-revolutionary photography. In the center – the hospital church of Saint Nicholas the Wonderworker (1742)
- Interactive map of Kurakin Almshouse
- Location: Russia, Moscow
- Coordinates: 55°46′09″N 37°39′13″E
- An Object of Cultural Heritage of the Peoples of the Russian Federation of Federal Significance. Registration No. 771410974770026 (Unified State Register of Cultural Heritage). Object No. 7735471000 (Wikigid Database)

The Kurakin Almshouse (Spital) is a wheelchair house built during the Russian Enlightenment by the Kurakin princes on the territory of their Moscow estate. One of the first charitable institutions in the Russian Empire. In 1820, it was renamed the Acceptable House.

The buildings of the almshouse are an object of cultural heritage of federal significance. Current address: Moscow, Novaya Basmannaya, 4.

== History ==
Prince Boris Ivanovich Kurakin (1676–1727), who had been the Russian ambassador in Paris since 1724, was so impressed with the House of Disabled People that he decided to create a similar charitable institution in Moscow. He failed to realize his idea in life. He bequeathed to his son Alexander to build "a spital for the charity of honored warriors who did not have a livelihood" and a church in honor of the icon of Nikolai Ugodnik.

In 1731, Empress Anna Ioannovna, by her decree, donated to Prince Alexander Kurakin a land tenure in the Basmannaya Sloboda 50 meters long, 40 fathoms wide for the construction of a spital (hospital). The Empress's generous gift was due not only to respect for the merits of Boris Ivanovich Kurakin and his good intentions, but also to his interest in developing the territory of the Basmannaya Sloboda.

Construction lasted more than 10 years. In 1742, the grand opening of the church and the spital took place, at which the new Empress Elizabeth Petrovna was already present. Spital was the first private charitable institution in Russia.

The name of the author of the architectural project has not reached our days. As Boris Kurakin bequeathed, the complex was built "with good architecture", "with all beauty" and "according to foreign custom". There is an assumption that the project was developed by Parisian architects. Initially, the hospital building was one-story and had a U-shape. This architectural monument belongs to the style of "Anninsky Baroque". The spiritual book of Boris Kurakin contained a detailed regulation of the spital, which his descendants followed.

The hospital accommodated only twelve patients and was intended for former officers who were injured. Each of them was allocated a furnished room. In the closets hung clothes for all seasons. Meat and poultry were served at the table on short days, and fish was served on fasting. Former warriors relied on wine every day and honey on holidays. Behind the house was a garden for walking. Residents had to adhere to only two basic rules – to spend the night in a hospital and attend services in the temple.

In the center of the ensemble was the church of Nikolai Ugodnik, connected to the premises of the hospital (demolished in Soviet times). According to one of the researchers, the temple had common architectural features with the famous church of San Carlo alle Quattro Fontane in Rome – the creation of the famous Italian architect Francesco Borromini. The main facade of the temple with its curvature resembled an altar apse, but was facing north and served as a narthex. The facade was decorated with a portico facing the gate. The "simplified version" of the church of Nikolai Ugodnik has survived – a church in the Kurakin Eldigino estate near Moscow.

In the 1790s, the ensemble was replenished with a two-story manor built for his family by the great-grandson of Boris Ivanovich Kurakin – Stepan Borisovich. In 1802, two service buildings were completed.

In 1820, the "spital" was renamed the Hospice. During the holidays in honor of Nikolai Ugodnik, up to five hundred beggars were fed here for free. Later, feeding at the temple began to be replaced by the issuance of free tickets to folk canteens.

During the Patriotic War of 1812, Napoleon arranged an infirmary for the French wounded in the Hospice House, and in the church of Nikolai Ugodnik he founded a stable. After the enemy was expelled from Moscow, Alexey Borisovich Kurakin (the younger brother of Stepan Borisovich) restored the church.

The last trustee of the church and the Hospice was the great-grandson of Alexei Borisovich – Fedor Alekseevich Kurakin. In 1902, he reconstructed the main building – strengthened the foundation, built on the second floor, and widened the window openings so that the rooms became lighter and more comfortable. At the same time, the building lost its baroque features and was decorated in the spirit of neoclassicism. Then Mikhail Shutsman designed a new street fence.

== Soviet time ==
After the Revolution of 1917, the almshouse was closed.

In 1935, the church of Nikolai Ugodnik was demolished, other premises of the Odd House were used for housing until the 1980s.

After the resettlement of communal apartments, the building stood abandoned for almost 20 years.

== Contemporary time ==
In 1998, by decree of Yury Luzhkov, a state institution, the Moscow House of Nationalities, was created in the building of the former Hospice House.

In 1999–2003, the reconstruction of the former Hospice House was carried out, thanks to which it was possible to recreate the appearance of the building, which it had in the 18th century. During the work, the masonry was renovated, vaulted ceilings were strengthened, destroyed columns made of white stone were restored, window openings were shifted, and stairs were restored. The fence with openwork gates found its former splendor. The interior and engineering systems were brought into line with the requirements of the time and the new tasks of the building.

Today, concerts, music and art festivals, conferences and forums are held here, and national holidays are celebrated.

== Sources ==
- Belozyorova T. A., Lazarev A. V., Solovyova Yu. N. The Corners of Old Moscow – Moscow, 2001
- Domashneva N. A. To the Secrets of the Basmanny Triangle – Moscow, 2004
- Domashneva N. A. White City. In the Gardens. Basmanny Guide – Moscow, 2007
- Kurakin Readings. Compiled by G. B. Logashov – Moscow: State Institution "Moscow House of Nationalities", 2006
- Lyubartovich V. A., Yukhimenko E.M. On the Land of Basmannaya Sloboda – Moscow, 1999
- Romaniuk S. K. From the History of Moscow Lanes. Guide – Moscow, 1988
- Logashova B. R. Princes Kurakin in the History and Culture of Russia of the 18th – 20th Centuries – Moscow: State Institution "Moscow House of Nationalities", 2008
