= Museum Press =

Defunct British publishing company

The Museum Press was a British fiction and non-fiction publisher, based in London, that was active in the post-Second World War period up to the 1960s.

== Selected titles ==
- Honey and your health: A nutrimental, medicinal & historical commentary. Bodog F. Beck, revised by Dorée Smedley, 1947.
- The Lurker at the Threshold, H P Lovecraft & August Derleth, 1948
- Hounds of Tindalos, Frank Belknap Long, 1950
- The Puppet Masters, Robert A Heinlein, 1953
- Cockney Cats. Warren Tute & Felix Fonteyn, 1953.
- Assignment in Eternity, Robert A Heinlein, 1954
- One Crowded Hour. Alan Hoby, 1954.
- Sentinels from Space, Eric Frank Russell, 1954
- Stefan Knapp, The Square Sun, 1956
- Landscape With Churches. G. M. Durant, 1965

== See also ==
- British Museum Press
