= Nikolay Orlov =

Nikolay Orlov (Russian: Николай Орлов) may refer to:

- Nikolay Alexeyevich Orlov (1827–1885), Russian diplomat
- Nikolai Orlov (painter) (1863–1924), Russian painter
- Nicholas W. Orloff (1890s–1961), Russian-American spy
- Nikolai Orlov (pianist) (1892–1964), Russian pianist
- Nikolay Orlov (wrestler) (fl. 1900s), Russian wrestler
- Nicholas Orloff (dancer) (1914/15–2001), Russian-American ballet dancer
- Nikolai Ivanovich Orlov (1895–1965), Soviet general
- Nikolai Stepanovich Orlov (1871 – after 1917), Russian deputy of the Fourth Imperial Duma
- Nikolay Orlov (military writer), professor of military art, military writer and pioneer of aeronautics
- Nikolai Liutsianovich Orlov (1952–2026), Russian herpetologist
