= Moscow House of Nationalities =

- Former name: Kurakin Almshouse
- Established: 1998
- Location: Russia, Moscow
- Coordinates: 55°46′09″N 37°39′13″E
- Type: Museum, Cultural Center

The Moscow House of Nationalities is a state institution and museum based in the former Kurakin Almshouse in Moscow.

== Museum ==
The Moscow House of Nationalities displays the “Museum of Peoples’ Friendship” with more than 10,000 museum pieces explaining national history and the lifestyle of nationalities in Russia. The museum's artifacts are regularly displayed at international and all-Russia events.

The Institution hosted the First Inter-Regional Meeting of Houses of Friendship and Houses of Nationalities in 2010, as well as events like Lessons of Friendship and Moscow in the National Music around the World , and developed programs like “Dialogue of cultures” under the guidance of Kristina Volkova, in line with the UN proclamation of 2010 as the International Year of Rapprochement of Cultures. It presents expositions and competitions that promote the development of inter-ethnic tolerance which involve ethnic grassroots associations as well as festivals, like the Multicolored Russia Festival or On a High Wave.

Nikolai Komarov, member of the Expert Committee of the State Duma of the Federal Assembly of the Russian Federation is the current director of the Museum.

On December 16–20, 2011, The House of Nationalities hosted the ceremony of installation of new knights into the Orders of St. Anna and St. Nicholas by the Head of the Russian Imperial House, H.I.H. Grand Duchess Maria Wladimirovna, on her visite to Moscow. Among those invested was the director of the House of Nationalities, N. P. Komarov; the dean of the History Faculty of Moscow State University, S. P. Karpov; the minister of the Moscow city government and the chair of the Committee of the Cultural Legacy of Moscow, A. V. Kibovskii.

== Expositions ==
The Museum houses temporary expositions. In 2021 Svetlana Solo Orlova curated the exhibit "Travel without a final destination" displaying the works of contemporary spanish and southamerican artists like Alvaro Abad, Daniel Garbade, Francis Arroyo or Ruben Dominguez.

== History ==
Prince Boris Ivanovich Kurakin (1676–1727) bequeathed to his son Alexander to build the Kurakin Almhouse and the church of Nikolai Ugodnik in 1742. The Almshouse was closed after the Revolution of 1917. Later in 1935, some premises of the Odd House were used for housing until the 1980s.

By decree of Yury Luzhkov, the state institution and Museum, the Moscow House of Nationalities was created in the building of the Almshouse.

Thanks to the reconstruction of the former Hospice House in 1999–2003 it was possible to recreate the appearance of the original building, of the 18th century.
