= Akvilev =

Akvilev (Russian: А́квилев; masculine) or Akvileva (А́квилева; feminine) is a Russian last name. It was artificially created by clergy as a Latin translation of the last name Orlov.
