= Nikolay Krivtsov =

Russian scientist

Nikolay Ivanovich Krivtsov
- Born: September 3, 1945; Oryol Oblast, RSFSR, Soviet Union
- Died: November 25, 2011 (aged 66)
- Education: Oryol State University
- Known for: Apiology, Beekeeping, Apitherapy
- Awards: Medal "In Commemoration of the 1000th Anniversary of Kazan"; Jubilee Medal "Twenty Years of Victory in the Great Patriotic War 1941–1945"
- Scientific career
- Fields: Apiology
- Workplaces: Russian Research Institute of Apiculture

Nikolay Ivanovich Krivtsov (Russian: Николай Иванович Кривцов; 3 September 1945 in Oryol Oblast – 25 November 2011) was a Russian apiologist, Doctor of Agricultural Sciences, Professor, Academician of the Russian Academy of Agricultural Sciences (2007). Since 1988, Director of the Russian Research Institute of Apiculture.

He graduated with honors from the Oryol State University in 1970, and defended his Candidat thesis in 1975. In 1992, he defended his doctoral thesis about selection of bees of the Central Russian breed.

He was a member of the Russian Apitherapy Coordinating Council. He was a member of the editorial board of the Russian journal "Pchelovodstvo". He was also a Member of the Petrovskaya Academy of Sciences and Arts.

Honored Scientist of the Russian Federation (2011). Laureate of the State Prize of the Russian Federation in the field of science and technology for the year 2000, and became a laureate of the Government of the Russian Federation in the field of education in 2004.
