= Svetlana Solo =

Russian painter

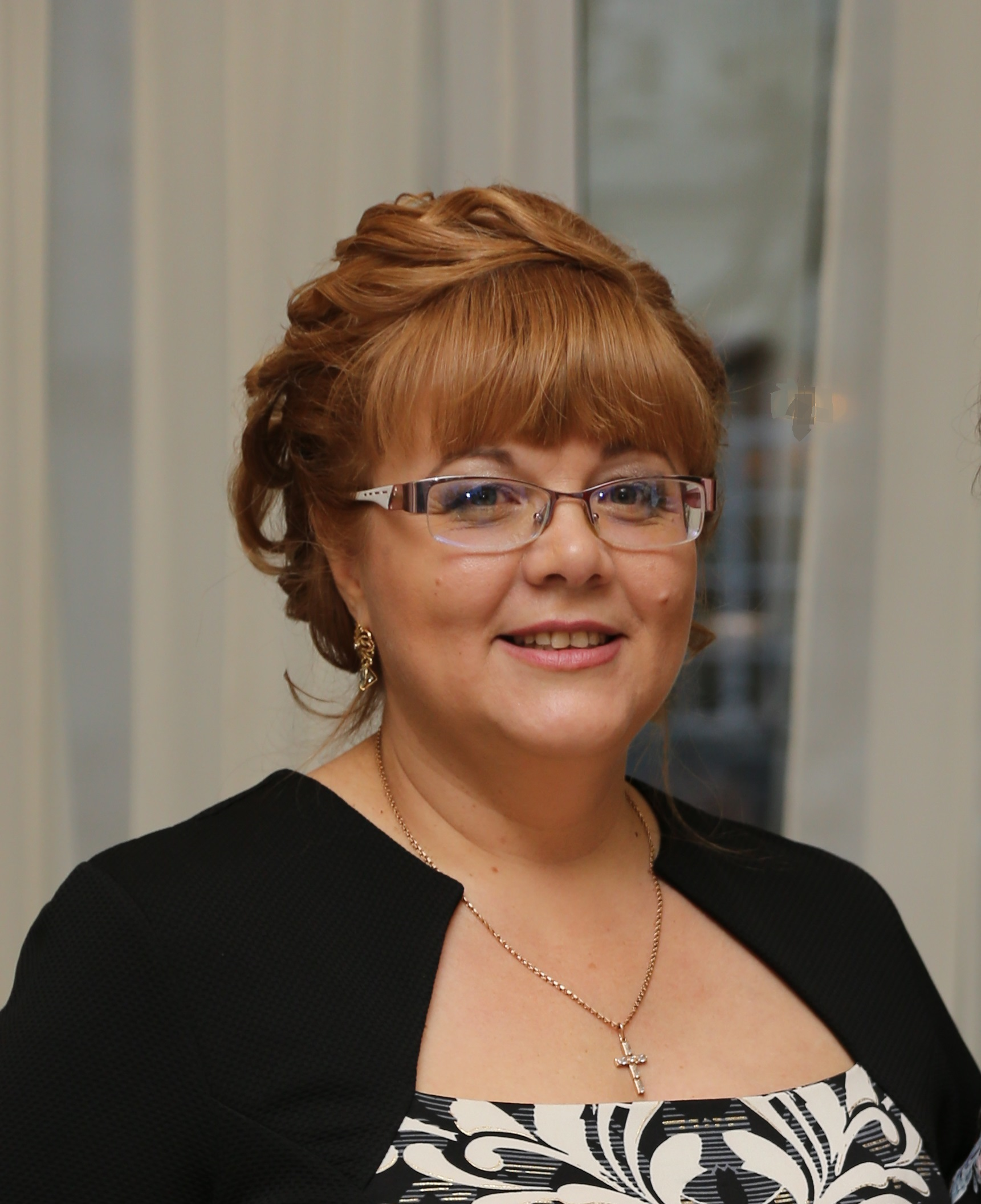
- Svetlana Vladimirovna Orlova
- Born: 15 September 1970; Ghafurov, Leninabad Region, Tajik SSR, Soviet Union
- Known for: Painting, drawing, writing
- Movement: Realism, Abstraction
- Spouse: Sergey Nikolaevich Orlov

Svetlana Vladimirovna Orlova, using the professional name Svetlana Solo (born 15 September 1970) is a Russian artist, journalist, and teacher. She is a full member (academician) of the European Academy of Natural Sciences (EANS), Section of Cultural Sciences (2019). Holder of the Order of "Unity" "Deeds in favor of peoples" for activities in field of culture of the United Nations Organization, the European Committee on decorations and gratuities (2008).

== Biography ==
Orlova was born on 15 September 1970 as Svetlana Vladimirovna Kholomova in a so called "Stalin's settlement" in the city of Ghafurov, in what was then the Leninabad Region in the Tajik Soviet Socialist Republic, in the Soviet Union. She studied at school No. 19, and began drawing in childhood. There was no School of Arts in the city, so she studied the basics of academic drawing from books. During her childhood and teenage years she was attracted by astronomy, poetry, and mountain hiking. The basketball trainer, Remzi Yusufovich Ibragimov played a large role in development of Svetlana's personality. Svetlana graduated from secondary school holding Mastery Certificate for Basketball. School records noted that she was "… Capable, talented, active. Uncontrollable by character and willful...". The development of her character was influenced by number of factors including her place of residence. "Stalin’s settlement" was populated by exiled Koreans, Germans, Crimean Tartars and other people. Settlement was near to closed city of Chkalovsk-30, now known as Buston.

In 2001 she graduated from Moscow City Pedagogic University named after M.A. Sholokhov, Arts and Graphics Department.

Svetlana uses the professional name "Solo Svetlana" (part of surname). She began to work as representative of art community under surname Solodovnikova until 2014.

== Family ==
Svetlana Orlova's mother, Nina Andreevna Kholomova (1948–2006), worked as chief accountant in the region and lectured in the accounting and auditing department of Khujand State University. Her father was Vladimir Ivanovich Kholomov (1945–2002). There were two children in the family, Svetlana, and her elder brother, Aleksandr. Her paternal grandfather was Carl Tobiasovich Raabe (1901–2005). He was imprisoned in the prison camp of Chkalovsk-30 during 1941–45. He was due to his origin, – he was German (Dutch-Mennonite). Mennonites are known for pacifism. Carl Tobiasovich refused to take up arms and was imprisoned. He was one of builders of the city of Chkalovsk-30 together with other Soviet Germans. "... I did not pay attention to the number on my grandfather's arm and only in adulthood did I understand everything", – Svetlana recalls. Her maternal grandfather, Andrey Mikhailovich Makeev (1917–1973) was born in Saratov Oblast. During the Great Patriotic War he served in the 3rd Air Army as a junior sergeant. He was a driver of a special car BC of 804th air-base service squadron. He was awarded with medals "For Battle Merit" and "For Courage".

== Creative activities ==
Svetlana Solo organizes art exhibitions of art, and is an artist, plein-airs, contests including international ones. She works in styles of abstract art, and realism. Her genres are landscape painting and still life. In 2021 she curated the exhibition of Spanish artists: "Travel without a final destination" at the Moscow House of Nationalities.

She considers her most influential teachers are: Viktor Germanovich Lavrov, Andrey Petrovich Alyokhin, and Irina Vladimirovna Rybakova. Exhibitions of her work have been held in Bulgaria, France, Germany, Italy, Moscow Oblast, Macedonia, Netherlands, Romania, Serbia, Slovenia, South Korea, Spain, Turkey, and the United Kingdom. Svetlana's paintings are exhibited at Plyoss State Historical-Architectural Museum-Reservation of Arts, Russia, in the City Gallery of Arts in Stara Zagora, Bulgaria, and in galleries in Bulgaria, Germany, Macedonia, Italy, Serbia, as well as in private collections.

== Author and organizer of projects ==
♦ International Children Art Contest of Drawings "World without War" (from 2014),

♦ Children's patriotic project "Portrait of the Veteran",

♦ Children's ecological project "Classics of domestic animalism",

♦ International project "Balkan ART" (from 2015),

♦ Annual plein-air of arts "Seasons of Levitan", Zvenigorod,

♦ Curator of exhibition projects "Art Voyage" Of the international art group "ART INTERNATIONAL GROUP",

♦ International plein-air "Russian-Turkish war" (2008, 2014) in Bulgaria,

♦ Annual Serbian-Russian caper "Vidici" jointly by Serbian-Russian Sid Society.

== Membership ==
♦ Union of Journalists of Moscow Oblast (a branch of the Union of Journalists of Russia) (2012). Author and leader of app to news paper "Zvenigorodskie Vedomosti" about art and artists "Seasons of Levitan" (2015).

♦ Professional Union of Artists of Russia (PUAR);

♦ Union of Artists of Moscow Oblast;

♦ International Fund of Arts;

♦ Member Of the international art group "ART INTERNATIONAL GROUP";

♦ Creative Union of Women-Artist "Irida";

♦ Union of Artists of Shropshire (United Kingdom);

♦ Chairman of section "Group of artists "Solo"" (2001) of Professional Union of Artists of Russia (PUAR), group status "international".

♦ Chairman of Zvenigorod Division of Union of Artists of Moscow Oblast, Board member (2018).

♦ Chairman of the regional public organization "International Art Community", Moscow (2022).

== Awards ==
♦ Project «Portrait of Veteran», award of Moscow Region Governor «Our Moscow Suburbs» (2015),

♦ Project «Seasons of Levitan», award of Moscow Region Governor (2015),

♦ The Order of «Unity» «Deeds in favor of peoples» (2008) for activities in field of culture of the United Nations Organization, the European Committee on decorations and gratuities.

== Personal exhibitions ==
1. 2017, 15.02–15.04, Russia, M.R. Zvenigorod, ART Gallery CVB, exhibition «Turquois Rhapsody»;

2. 2016, 15–22 March, Russia, Moscow, Moscow Public Fund of Culture, exhibition «Feelings Expression»;

3. 2017, 26.09–22.10, Russia, M.R. Zvenigorod, ART Gallery CVB, exhibition «Feelings Expression»;

4. 2014, 20.07.31.07, Bulgaria, Plovdiv, «Plovdiv» Gallery in building of the Community Council, exhibition «Bulgaria through eyes of Russian artist»;

5. 2013, 1–24 December, Macedonia, Prilep. City Gallery, exhibition «Ignatov's Path»;

6. 2013, 9–22 August, Macedonia, Ohrid Robevu Palace, exhibition «Phoenix, the Bird»;

7. 2012, 8 December Russia, M.R. Zvenigorod, ART Gallery CVB, exhibition «Crossroad»;

8. 2012, 10–25 July, Macedonia, Prilep. City Gallery exhibition «Two Lights»;

9. 2012, 26.07–04.08, Macedonia, Skopje. Exhibition in the Central City Library «Braka Miladinovci»;

10. 2006, April, Russia, Moscow, GU «Moscow House of Nations», personal photo exhibition «Natural Beauties of Macedonia».

== Winner of contests ==
1. 2019, November, Russia, Moscow, XXVII International Exhibition-Contest of Modern Art "Russian Art Week" in multimedia project «Time Machine» «Games with Time» II place;

2. 2018; Russia, Moscow, Participant of Olympics of Arts of the Institute of Culture and Arts of MSPU, nomination of landscape paintings; II Place;

3. 2017; Russia, Moscow region, Winner of Contest of Moscow Region Governor "Our Moscow Suburbs"III Place of artistic project "Seasons of Levitan";

4. 2016; Russia, Moscow region, Winner of Contest of Moscow region Governor "Our Moscow Suburbs"III Place of artistic project "Portrait of Veteran";

5. 2016, May, Republic of Belarus, participation in International Olympics of Art, II place in nomination «Landscape paintings»;

6. 2012, Russia, Moscow region, Zvenigorod, II place in Creative Contest of Photos in nomination «Nature through my eyes».

== Gallery of works ==
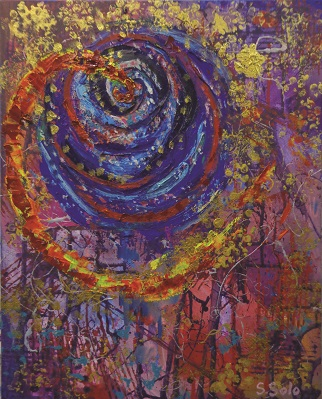
Singularity. 100х80, 2015.

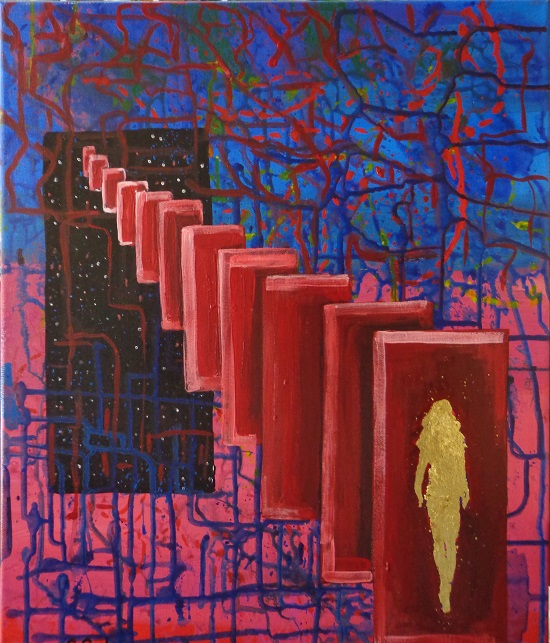
Online life. 50х40, 2020

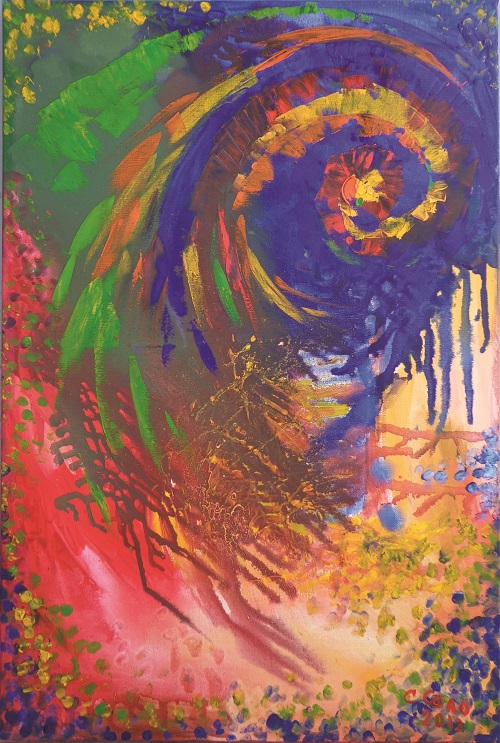
The aspiration. 76х51, 2012.

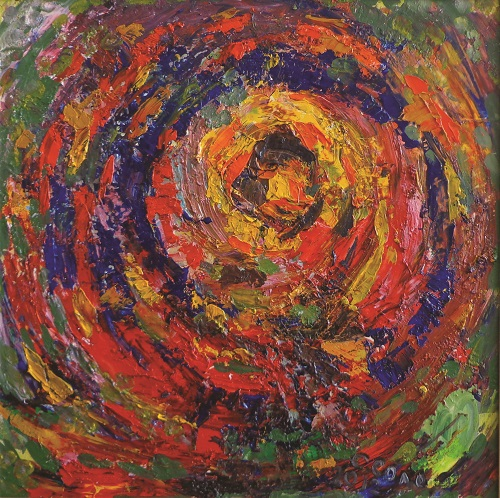
The smell of roses. 39х39, 2014.

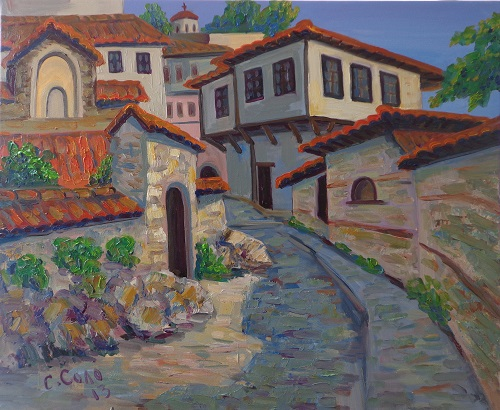
The hospital. 60x50, 2013.

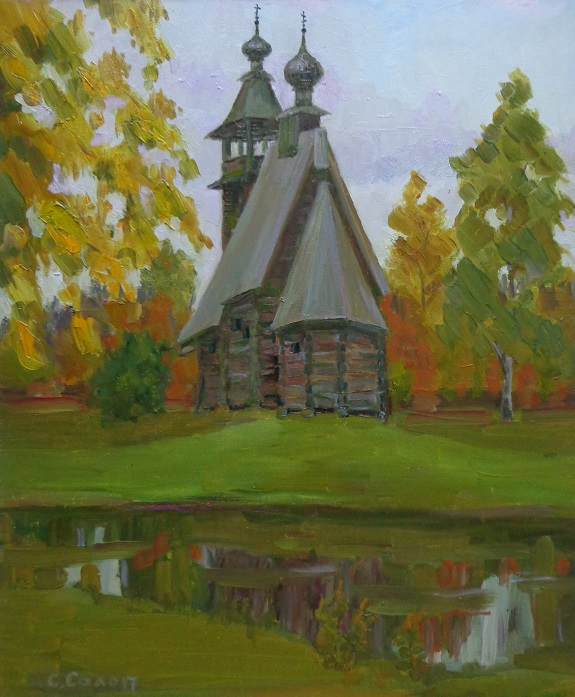
Kostroma suburbs. 60х50, 2017.

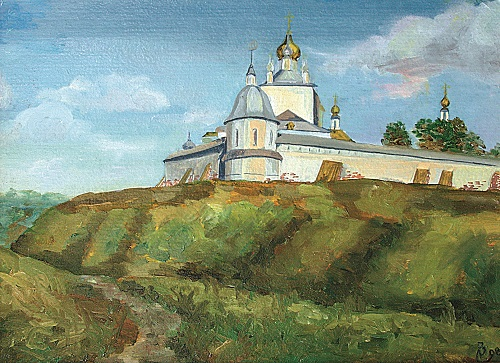
Perslavl-Zalessky. Goritsky Monastery. 33х46, 1998.

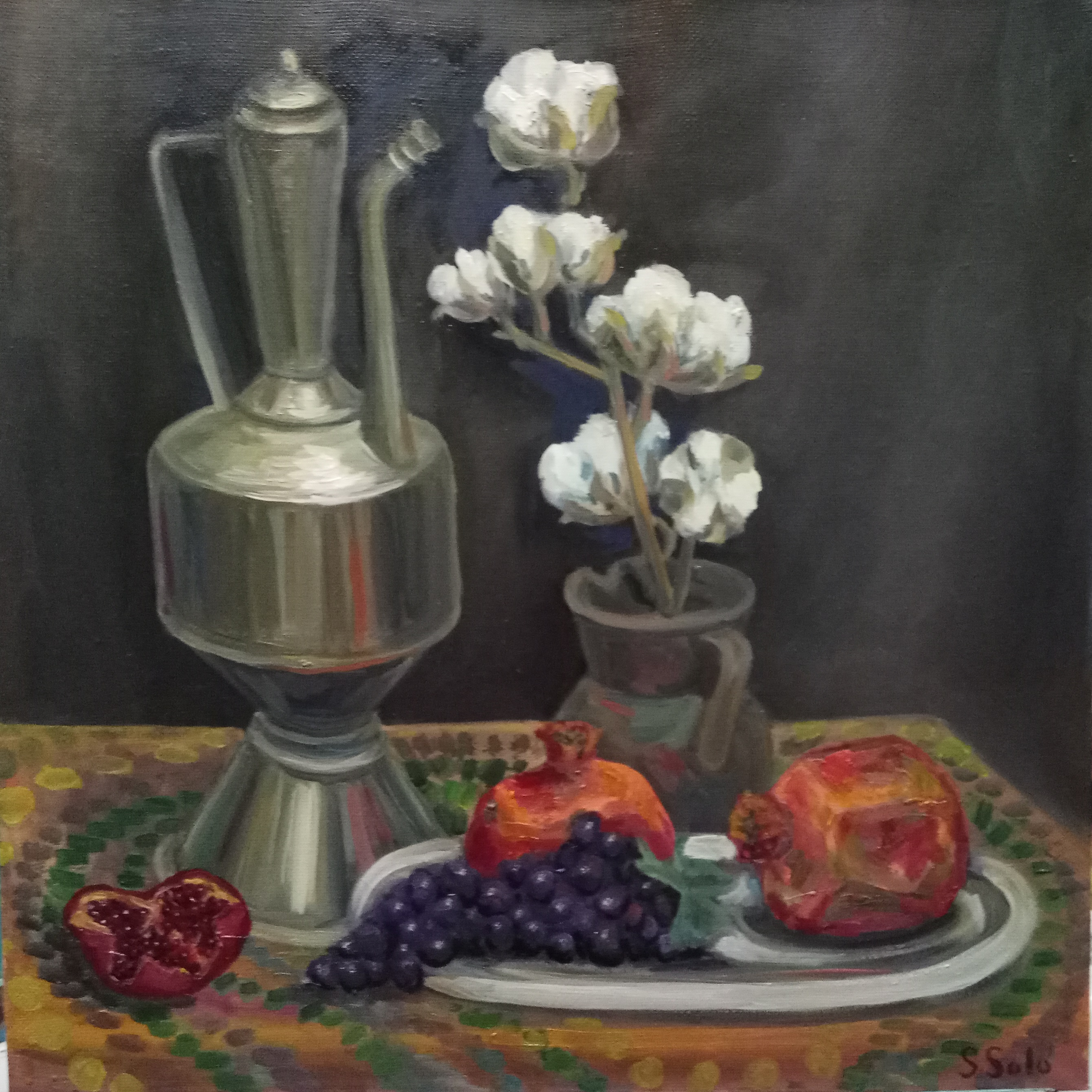
Oriental still life with a cotton branch. 60x60, 2020.
