= MCD peptide =

22-amino acid residue peptide

The amino acid sequence of MCD peptide
Met - Cys - Ile - Cys - Lys - Asn - Gly - Lys - Pro - Leu - Pro - Gly - Phe - Ile - Gly - Lys - Ile - Cys - Arg - Lys - Ile - Cys - Met - Met - Gln - Gln -Thr - His(NH2)

Mast cell degranulating (MCD) peptide is a cationic 22-amino acid residue peptide, which is a component of the venom of the bumblebee (Megabombus pennsylvanicus). At low concentrations, MCD peptide can stimulate mast cell degranulation. At higher concentrations, it has anti-inflammatory properties. In addition, it is a potent blocker of voltage-sensitive potassium channels.

== Sources ==
MCD peptide is a component of bumblebee (Megabombus pennsylvanicus) venom. In addition to MCD peptide, melittin and apamin have also been identified in this venom and are also described as voltage-dependent channel blockers. MCD peptide is also present in the venom of the honey bee Apis mellifera.

== Chemistry ==
MCD peptide is a cationic 22-amino acid residue peptide with two disulfide bridges. Although the MCD peptide sequence shows similarity with apamin, they have different toxic properties. MCD peptide belongs to a large family composed of numerous derivatives detecting specific targets and displaying different toxic effects.

== Targets ==
MCD peptide has immunotoxic as well as neurotoxic properties due to different active sites of the MCD peptide. The MCD peptide has an immunotoxic effect on mast cells by releasing histamine from these cells. MCD peptide has also been described as a potent modulator of voltage-gated ionic channels. It binds to several subclasses of voltage-gated potassium channels (Kv channels), including Kv1.1, Kv1.6, and less potently to Kv1.2. Accordingly, MCD peptide can act in various regions of rat brain, including cerebellum, brainstem, hypothalamus, striatum, midbrain, cortex, and hippocampus. However, MCD peptide shows no binding activity in the peripheral neuronal system.

== Mode of action ==
For its immunotoxic properties, a low concentration of MCD peptide can cause mast cell degranulation by releasing histamine; at higher concentrations it displays anti-inflammatory activities.

Through its effect on ionic channels, MCD peptide can induce long term potentiation (LTP) in CA1 region of hippocampus. It binds and inactivates voltage-dependent K+ channels, including fast-inactivating (A-type) and slow-inactivating (delayed rectifier) K+ channels. The binding site of the MCD peptide on the K+ ion channel protein complex is a multimeric protein, consisting of polypeptide chains of molecular weight between 76,000 and 80,000 and 38,000 daltons. By blocking potassium channels, the MCD peptide can increase the duration of action potentials and increase neuronal excitability.

== Toxicity ==
The neurotoxicity of MCD peptide is distincted from its histamine releasing function. The histamine releasing function of MCD peptide, at low concentrations, causes the degranulation of mast cell , and shows anti-inflammatory activity at higher concentrations. These actions of MCD peptide on mast cells is thought to be involved in allergic and inflammatory processes related to type I hypersensitivity reaction.

MCD peptide shows neurotoxicity by inducing epileptiform seizures in rat, when intraventricularly injected. This toxicity is caused by the blockage of voltage-gated potassium channels by the MCD peptide. However, there is no toxicity of MCD administered peripherally, even at high doses.

== Therapeutic use ==
As a mast cell activator, the MCD peptide evokes large increases in antigen-specific serum immunoglobulin G (IgG) responses. Therefore, it is used as a vaccine adjuvant. MCD peptide analogs, such as [Ala12] MCD, provide a base for designing agents that can prevent IgE/Fc-RIa interactions and reduce allergic conditions.
