= Alexander Orlov (historian) =

Russian historian (1938–2024)

- Александр Орлов
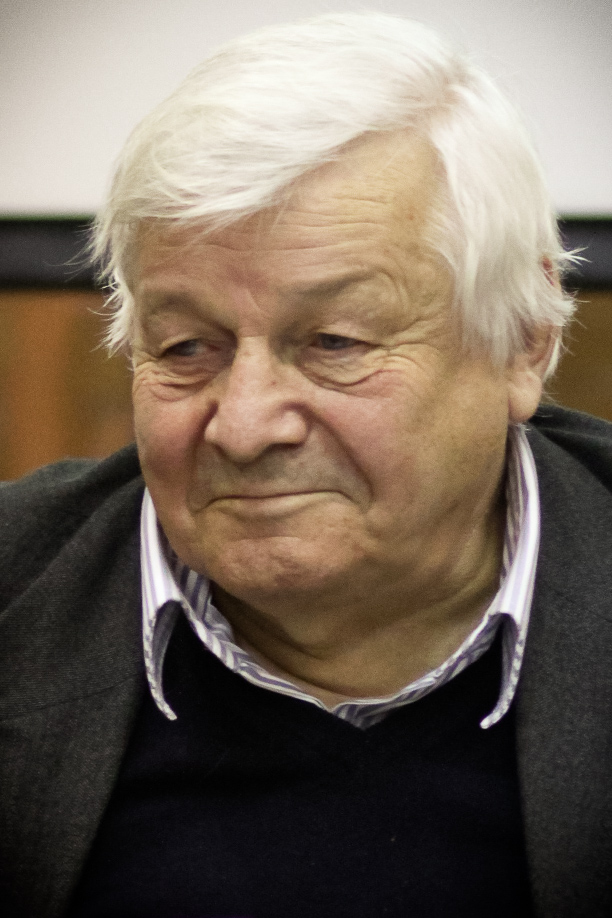
- Perevezentsev in 2011
- Born: 1 December 1938
- Died: 8 March 2024 (aged 85)
- Resting place: Khovanskoye Cemetery
- Awards: Honoured Higher Schools Worker of Russia; Order of Holy Prince Daniel of Moscow
- Scientific career
- Fields: History
- Institutions: Moscow State University
- Academic advisors: Mikhail Belyavsky

Alexander Sergeyevich Orlov (Russian: Алекса́ндр Серге́евич Орло́в; 1 December 1938 – 8 March 2024) was a Russian contemporary historian and an author of several handbooks. He was a specialist on socio-political history of Russia in the 18th century, in the history of science and in education about that period.

Orlov graduated at the historical faculty of the Moscow State University (MGU) in 1965 and defended his candidates-thesis on the theme "Unrest in the Urals in the 1750s and 1760s and the expedition of Prince Alexander Vyazemsky" in 1971. His thesis was supervised by M.T. Belyavsky. He worked at the historical faculty from 1968.

From 1995, he was director of the historical museum of the MGU.

Orlov died on 8 March 2024, at the age of 85.
