= Vyacheslav I. Lebedev =

Vyacheslav Ivanovich Lebedev (Russian: Вячеслав Иванович Лебедев; born April 1, 1950) is a Russian apiologist, Doctor of Sciences, Professor at the P.A. Kostychev Ryazan State Agrotechnological University (since 1995), Director of the Russian Research Institute of Apiculture (2011—2015), Сorresponding Member of the Petrovskaya Academy of Sciences and Arts. Laureate of the 2000 State Prize of the Russian Federation and of the 2003 Prize of the Government of the Russian Federation in the field of education.

He graduated from the Ryazan State University in 1972. In 1993, he defended his doctoral dissertation at the Russian State Agrarian University - Moscow Timiryazev Agricultural Academy. In 1996, he received the title of Professor.

He is a member of the editorial board of the Russian journal "Pchelovodstvo".

He is a Doctor Honoris Causa of the Grodno State Agricultural University (2013). He was awarded a Medal "In Commemoration of the 1000th Anniversary of Kazan".
