= Nikolai Stepanovich Orlov =

Nikolai Orlov Russian: Николай Орлов
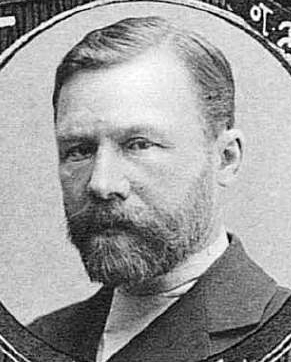
- photo of 1913

Deputy of the Fourth Imperial Duma
- In office 20 November 1912 – 6 October 1917
- Monarch: Nicholas II / monarchy abolished
- Succeeded by: post abolished

Personal details
- Born: Nikolai Stepanovich Orlov; 1871 Novosyolki, Vologda Governorate, Russian Empire
- Died: after 1917
- Party: Progressive Bloc

Nikolai Stepanovich Orlov (Russian: Никола́й Степа́нович Орло́в; 1871, Novosyolki, Vologda Governorate — after 1917) was a peasant, an estate manager, a chairman of a volost court and a deputy of the Fourth Imperial Duma from the Vologda Governorate between 1912and 1917. He had centrist political position and was a member of the Progressive Bloc. In the days of the February Revolution of 1917, he was in Petrograd and took part in revolutionary events: from 2 to 13 March, he was a member of Duma's Commission on Internal Order.

== Literature ==
- Николаев А. Б. Орлов Николай Степанович (in Russian) // Государственная дума Российской империи: 1906—1917 / Б. Ю. Иванов, А. А. Комзолова, И. С. Ряховская. — Москва: РОССПЭН, 2008. — P. 430. — 735 p. — ISBN 978-5-8243-1031-3.
- Орлов (in Russian) // Члены Государственной думы (портреты и биографии): Четвертый созыв, 1912—1917 г. / сост. М. М. Боиович. — Москва: Тип. Т-ва И. Д. Сытина, 1913. — P. 38. — LXIV, 454, [2] p.
