= Dmitry Orlov =

Dmitry Orlov may refer to:

- Dmitry Orlov (banker) (1943–2014), Russian banker
- Dmitry Orlov (ice hockey) (born 1991), Russian professional ice hockey player
- Dmitry Orlov (writer) (born 1962), Russian-American engineer and a writer
- Dmitri Olegovich Orlov (born 1966), Russian mathematician
- Dmitry Moor, born Dmitry Stakhievich Orlov, Russian artist noted for his propaganda posters
