= Pchelovodstvo =

- Categories: Beekeeping
- Founded: 1921
- Country: Soviet Union; Russia
- Based in: Moscow
- Language: Russian
- Website: Official website
- ISSN: 0369-8629

Pchelovodstvo (Russian: Пчеловодство) is a venerable and well regarded Russian journal dealing with Beekeeping. The journal promotes the newest methods of beekeeping and targets a broad audience.

== History ==
The first issue was published in October 1921. In USSR, it was an illustrated monthly magazine of the Ministry of Agriculture, which was published 12 times a year.

In 1974, the circulation of the magazine was 420,000 copies.

In Russian Federation, the magazine was published monthly until 1993; in 1994–1999, 6 issues were published per year; in 2000–2004, 8 issues were published per year.

Nowadays this magazine is published ten times a year. The headquarters is in Moscow. Its chief editor is O. A. Vereshchaka. The editorial board is made up of Academician of the RAS A. M. Smirnov, Hon. Prof. Dr. V. N. Krylov, Prof. Dr. h. c. V. I. Lebedev et al. The journal is included in the list of both leading scientific journals and publications under review of VAK (Higher Attestation Commission). Pchelovodstvo is also included in Russian index of scientific quoting Russian Science Citation Index.
