= Igor Orlov =

Igor Orlov may refer to:

- Igor Orlov (alias), code name for Soviet double agent Aleksander Kopatzky
- Yegor Orlov (born 1996), Russian ice-hockey player
- Igor Orlov, Russian governor of Arkhangelsk Oblast
