= Sergei Orlov =

Sergei Orlov may refer to:

- Sergei Orlov (footballer, born 1974), Russian football player and coach
- Sergei Orlov (footballer, born 1989), Russian football player
- Sergei Orlov (sculptor) (1911–1971), Russian sculptor
- Sergei Vladimirovich Orlov (1880–1958), Russian-Soviet astrophysicist
