= Alexandre Orloff =

Artist

Alexander Orloff
- Born: Alexander Orloff; 1899; Rodome, Poland
- Died: 1979 (aged 79–80); Cormeilles-en-Parisis, France
- Education: School of Fine Arts, Ukraine
- Known for: Painting
- Movement: Cubism

Alexander Orloff also Alexander Konstantinovich Orlov (Russian: Александр Константинович Орлов; 27 January 1899 – 3 April 1979) is a painter of Russian origin, born in Rodome, Poland (according to other sources – in St. Petersburg), died in Cormeilles-en-Parisis, near Paris.

== Biography ==
Orloff spent his childhood in Voronezh in Russia . In 1924, he left Russia and settled in Prague, where he attended the Ukrainian School of Fine Arts and was a student of Serguej Mako. He exhibited in various galleries in Czechoslovakia and Poland. In 1933 he had a solo exhibition at the gallery Prague Karasek. He participated in several art associations, became an illustrator for "Praguer Press". He moved in 1933 to France, where he exhibited at the Salon des Tuileries, the Salon des Independants in the lounge of the Free Art and Exhibition of new realities . He participated in exhibitions of Russian-born artists from the School of Paris and other group exhibitions. He held personal exhibitions in 1969, 1973, 1975.

He spent the last years of his life in the Zemgora Russian retirement home in Cormeilles-en-Parisis.

== Works ==
His Cubist work began in Prague. Orloff's painting, however, evolved to a more Symbolist style in the 1930s. After the war, he began to create abstract works in the vein of lyrical abstraction. He also painted landscapes, still lifes, indoor scenes, and portraits. A piece of his art, "Deep Thought", was sold through Sotheby's in 2006.

== Museums ==
- National Gallery in Prague
- Oscar Ghez Collection – formerly of the Petit Palais, Geneva

== Sources ==
- Lejkind, O., Mahrov, K., Severjuhin, D., Hudozhniki russkovo zarubezhja: 1917-1939: Biografitcheskij slovar.
- Sankt-Peterburg: Izdatel'stvo Notabene 1999.
- Paris Russian: 1910–1960. St. Petersburg: Palace Editions, 2003. (Catalogue of the exhibition shown at the Russian Museum in St. Petersburg, at the Von der Heydt-Museum Wuppertal and the Musée des Beaux-Arts, 2003–2004)

== External links and references ==
- Images of art by Orloff
