= Characteristics of common wasps and bees =

While observers can easily confuse common wasps and bees at a distance or without close observation, there are many different characteristics of large bees and wasps that can be used to identify them.

== Characteristics ==
	Bees (Family: Apidae)		Wasps (Family: Vespidae)				
Name	Western honey bee	Bumblebee	Paper wasp	Yellowjacket	Bald-faced hornet	European hornet	Asian hornet
Image							
Colors	Amber to brown translucent alternating with black stripes. (Note: Though western honeybees mostly have distinguishable alternating stripes, some are mostly black.) Exact pattern and colouration varies depending on strain/breed.	Yellow with black stripes, sometimes with olive, brown, orange-brown, red, white, or as in Bombus pratorum, dark.	Dusty yellow to dark brown or black	Black and opaque bright yellow stripes	Black and ivory white markings	Black and dark body with yellow (Note: Differing color forms exist geographically.)	Black and orange or yellow markings
Coat	Furry (short hair)	Furry (long hair)	Little or no hair			Some hair	
Size	1.3 cm (0.51 in)	2.5 cm (0.98 in) or more	1.9 to 2.5 cm (0.75 to 0.98 in)	1.3 cm (0.51 in)	Up to 3.0 cm (1.2 in)	Up to 3.5 cm (1.4 in)	Up to 3.5 cm (1.4 in)
Legs	Not generally visible while flying (Note: Light-colored pollen on the pollen baskets on a honeybee's rear legs can be visible.)		Two thin long legs are visible hanging down during flight. There are no pollen baskets.	Legs not generally visible in flight. There are no pollen baskets.			
Behavior	Gentle (Note: Domesticated bees have been selected over time for gentleness. There are several races of domesticated honey bees with varying characteristics of honey production, disease resistance and gentleness.)	Gentle	Not aggressive	Defensive (Note: These wasps are often considered aggressive, however a better term for them is defensive, as they only display aggressive behaviour around their nests.)			
Food	Pollen and nectar from flowers		Other insects as larvae, sugary liquids such as nectar as adults	Other insects, overripe fruit, sugary drinks, human food and food waste, meat (Note: Yellowjackets are carnivorous during the brood rearing part of the season. They feed insects to their brood, and obtain the sugar for their flight-muscle energy mostly from secretions of the brood. During this time they can be attracted to traps baited with meat or fish. Near the end of summer, when brood rearing ceases and this sugar source is no longer available, yellow jackets become frantic for sugar, and can be baited with sugar-based baits. They are also much more likely to visit fall flowers for nectar than they are earlier in the season.)	Other insects as larvae, sugary liquids such as nectar as adults		
Sting	Barbed. Kills bee; (Note: The barbed stinger evolved as a colony defense against invertebrates; the invariable outcome of stinging a mammal or bird is that the stinger becomes lodged in the victim's skin and tears free from the honey bee's body, leading to her death within minutes. As such, there is rarely any evolutionary advantage for a bee to sting a mammal to defend itself as an individual; honey bees will generally only sting when the hive is directly threatened and honey bees found in the field or on a flower will rarely sting.) continues pumping.	Smooth; can repeat. Retracts.					
Sting Pain	2	2	1.5–3 depending on species	2 (Vespula pensylvanica)	2	2.x	4.0+
Lights	Not attracted to lights at night unless nest is disturbed, or light is placed near hive, or bee is sick.		Attracted to lights at night				
Lives in	Large colonies of flat, wax-based honeycomb hanging vertically.	Small cavities in the soil or sometime above ground in dark cavities. Commonly uses small rodent nests, may use bird cavity nests.	Small umbrella-shaped papery combs hanging horizontally in protected spaces such as attics, eaves or soil cavities.	Large paper nest, upside down pear shaped, hanging from branches and eaves; also barns and attics. Some yellowjacket species nest in the ground.		Very large paper nest in hollow trees, sheltered positions. Has a brown, protective layer when the nest is in an unsheltered position. Also found in barns, attics, hollow walls and abandoned bee hives.	

== See also ==
- Schmidt sting pain index
