= Caesar A. von Ramdohr =

American obstetrician

Caesar Augustin von Ramdohr (September 4, 1853 or 1855 – 1913) was an American obstetrician and emeritus professor of the New York Post-Graduate Medical School. He qualified as a physician at New York University in 1877. He was of German origin and petitioned for American citizenship in 1878.
