= Apitoxin =

Venom made by bees

Apitoxin or bee venom is the venom produced by the honey bee. It is a cytotoxic and hemotoxic bitter colorless liquid containing proteins, which may produce local inflammation. It may have similarities to sea nettle toxin.

== Components ==
Honey bee venom is a complex mixture of proteins and smaller molecules.

The main component is melittin, which amounts to 52% of venom peptides. One of the main allergens is phospholipase A_{2}, which amounts to 12% and is an enzyme that catalyzes the hydrolysis of phospholipids, causing degradation of cell membranes, causing cell death. Adolapin contributes 2–5% of the peptides. Further protein components include apamin (2%), a neurotoxin, hyaluronidase (2%), which dilates blood vessels, increasing their permeability and facilitating the spread of the venom, mast cell degranulating peptide (2%), tertiapin, and secapin. Small molecules in bee venom include histamine (0.1–1%), dopamine and noradrenaline.

== Research ==
Mark Crislip, a practicing infectious disease specialist, examined the claims that bee venom can treat arthritis. He was unable to "find a clean, i.e., a non-TCPM based, randomized, placebo-controlled study of bee venom in humans for the treatment [of] arthritis."

Bee venom is also considered ineffective for the treatment or prevention of cancer, with no clinical studies to date supporting such effects. According to the American Cancer Society, there is no scientific evidence that apitherapy or bee venom therapy can treat or change the course of cancer or any other disease. Clinical trials have shown that apitherapy is ineffective in treating multiple sclerosis or any other disease, and can exacerbate multiple sclerosis symptoms.

== See also ==
- Apitherapy
- Bee sting
- Beekeeping
- Hive management
- Honeybee
