= Khachatour Koshtoyants =

Soviet Russian physiologist and professor

Khachatour Koshtoyants (Armenian: Խաչատուր Սեդրակի Կոշտոյանց; Russian: Хачатур Седракович Коштоянц; September 26, 1900 – April 2, 1961) was a Soviet physiologist, Corresponding Member of the Academy of Sciences of the Soviet Union (since 1939), Member of the Armenian National Academy of Sciences (since 1943), Professor at the Lomonosov Moscow State University (since 1930), Doktor Nauk in Biological Sciences (1935).

He was a Laureate of the 1947 Stalin Prize.

== Life ==
He was born in Armenia. He graduated from the Lomonosov Moscow State University in 1926. From 1929 he worked in his alma mater. In 1935 he received the title of Professor.

From 1943 Koshtoyants headed the Department of Physiology of Animals at the Lomonosov Moscow State University. Also from 1936 he worked at the Severtsov Institute of Ecology and Evolution of the Academy of Sciences of the Soviet Union. From 1946 to 1953 he was Director of the Vavilov Institute for the History of Science and Technology.

He died in Moscow in 1961.
