= Melittin =

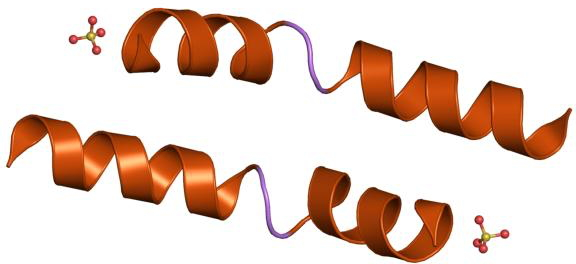
- Melittin

Identifiers
- Symbol: Melittin
- Pfam: PF01372
- InterPro: IPR002116
- SCOP2: 2mlt / SCOPe / SUPFAM
- TCDB: 1.C.18
- OPM superfamily: 151
- OPM protein: 2mlt
Available protein structures:
- PDB: IPR002116 PF01372 (ECOD; PDBsum)
- AlphaFold: IPR002116; PF01372

Melittin
Identifiers
CAS Number	20449-79-0
3D model (JSmol)	Interactive image
ChEBI	CHEBI:6736
ChEMBL	ChEMBL412927
ChemSpider	17290230
ECHA InfoCard	100.157.496
MeSH	Melitten
PubChem CID	16133648
UNII	24VT8NVE75
CompTox Dashboard (EPA)	DTXSID001046261
- InChI: InChI=1S/C131H229N39O31/c1-23-71(16)102(163-97(176)60-135)122(194)146-62-98(177)148-74(19)109(181)164-100(69(12)13)124(196)160-88(55-65(4)5)116(188)155-84(41-30-33-51-134)115(187)165-101(70(14)15)125(197)161-90(57-67(8)9)118(190)168-106(77(22)173)128(200)169-105(76(21)172)123(195)147-63-99(178)150-92(58-68(10)11)129(201)170-54-36-44-94(170)121(193)149-75(20)108(180)158-89(56-66(6)7)117(189)166-104(73(18)25-3)127(199)162-93(64-171)120(192)159-91(59-78-61-145-80-38-27-26-37-79(78)80)119(191)167-103(72(17)24-2)126(198)157-83(40-29-32-50-133)111(183)154-85(42-34-52-143-130(139)140)112(184)152-82(39-28-31-49-132)110(182)153-86(43-35-53-144-131(141)142)113(185)156-87(46-48-96(137)175)114(186)151-81(107(138)179)45-47-95(136)174/h26-27,37-38,61,65-77,81-94,100-106,145,171-173H,23-25,28-36,39-60,62-64,132-135H2,1-22H3,(H2,136,174)(H2,137,175)(H2,138,179)(H,146,194)(H,147,195)(H,148,177)(H,149,193)(H,150,178)(H,151,186)(H,152,184)(H,153,182)(H,154,183)(H,155,188)(H,156,185)(H,157,198)(H,158,180)(H,159,192)(H,160,196)(H,161,197)(H,162,199)(H,163,176)(H,164,181)(H,165,187)(H,166,189)(H,167,191)(H,168,190)(H,169,200)(H4,139,140,143)(H4,141,142,144)/t71-,72-,73-,74-,75-,76+,77+,81-,82-,83-,84-,85-,86-,87-,88-,89-,90-,91-,92-,93-,94-,100-,101-,102-,103-,104-,105-,106-/m0/s1 Key: VDXZNPDIRNWWCW-JFTDCZMZSA-N; InChI=1/C131H229N39O31/c1-23-71(16)102(163-97(176)60-135)122(194)146-62-98(177)148-74(19)109(181)164-100(69(12)13)124(196)160-88(55-65(4)5)116(188)155-84(41-30-33-51-134)115(187)165-101(70(14)15)125(197)161-90(57-67(8)9)118(190)168-106(77(22)173)128(200)169-105(76(21)172)123(195)147-63-99(178)150-92(58-68(10)11)129(201)170-54-36-44-94(170)121(193)149-75(20)108(180)158-89(56-66(6)7)117(189)166-104(73(18)25-3)127(199)162-93(64-171)120(192)159-91(59-78-61-145-80-38-27-26-37-79(78)80)119(191)167-103(72(17)24-2)126(198)157-83(40-29-32-50-133)111(183)154-85(42-34-52-143-130(139)140)112(184)152-82(39-28-31-49-132)110(182)153-86(43-35-53-144-131(141)142)113(185)156-87(46-48-96(137)175)114(186)151-81(107(138)179)45-47-95(136)174/h26-27,37-38,61,65-77,81-94,100-106,145,171-173H,23-25,28-36,39-60,62-64,132-135H2,1-22H3,(H2,136,174)(H2,137,175)(H2,138,179)(H,146,194)(H,147,195)(H,148,177)(H,149,193)(H,150,178)(H,151,186)(H,152,184)(H,153,182)(H,154,183)(H,155,188)(H,156,185)(H,157,198)(H,158,180)(H,159,192)(H,160,196)(H,161,197)(H,162,199)(H,163,176)(H,164,181)(H,165,187)(H,166,189)(H,167,191)(H,168,190)(H,169,200)(H4,139,140,143)(H4,141,142,144)/t71-,72-,73-,74-,75-,76+,77+,81-,82-,83-,84-,85-,86-,87-,88-,89-,90-,91-,92-,93-,94-,100-,101-,102-,103-,104-,105-,106-/m0/s1 Key: VDXZNPDIRNWWCW-JFTDCZMZBB
- SMILES: CCC(C)C(C(=O)NCC(=O)NC(C)C(=O)NC(C(C)C)C(=O)NC(CC(C)C)C(=O)NC(CCCCN)C(=O)NC(C(C)C)C(=O)NC(CC(C)C)C(=O)NC(C(C)O)C(=O)NC(C(C)O)C(=O)NCC(=O)NC(CC(C)C)C(=O)N1CCCC1C(=O)NC(C)C(=O)NC(CC(C)C)C(=O)NC(C(C)CC)C(=O)NC(CO)C(=O)NC(Cc2c[nH]c3c2cccc3)C(=O)NC(C(C)CC)C(=O)NC(CCCCN)C(=O)NC(CCCNC(=N)N)C(=O)NC(CCCCN)C(=O)NC(CCCNC(=N)N)C(=O)NC(CCC(=O)N)C(=O)NC(CCC(=O)N)C(=O)N)NC(=O)CN

Properties
Chemical formula	C_{131}H_{229}N_{39}O_{31}
Molar mass	2846.46266
- Except where otherwise noted, data are given for materials in their standard state (at 25 °C [77 °F], 100 kPa). verify (what is ?) Infobox references

Melittin is the main component (40–60% of the dry weight) and the major pain-producing substance of honeybee (Apis mellifera) venom. Melittin is a basic peptide consisting of 26 amino acids.

== Function ==
The principal function of melittin as a component of bee venom is to cause pain and destruction of tissue of intruders that threaten a beehive. However, melittin is expressed, not only in the venom gland, but also in other tissues when the bee is infected with various pathogens. The over-expression of melittin (as well as secapin, another venom molecule) in infected honey bees may indicate that it plays a role in the immune response of bees to infectious diseases.

== Structure ==
Melittin is a small peptide with no disulfide bridge; the N-terminal part of the molecule is predominantly hydrophobic and the C-terminal part is hydrophilic and strongly basic. In water, it forms a tetramer, but it also can spontaneously integrate itself into cell membranes.

== Mechanism of action ==
Injection of melittin into animals and humans causes pain sensations. It has strong surface effects on cell membranes, causing pore formation in epithelial cells and the destruction of red blood cells. Melittin also activates nociceptor (pain receptor) cells through a variety of mechanisms.

Melittin can open thermal nociceptor TRPV1 channels via cyclooxygenase metabolites, resulting in depolarization of nociceptor cells. The pore-forming effects in cells cause the release of pro-inflammatory cytokines. It also activates G-protein-coupled receptor-mediated opening of transient receptor potential channels. Finally, melittin up-regulates the expression of Nav1.8 and Nav1.9 sodium channels in nociceptor cell, causing long-term action-potential firing and pain sensation.

Melittin inhibits protein kinase C, Ca^{2+}/calmodulin-dependent protein kinase II, myosin light chain kinase, and Na^{+}/K^{+}-ATPase (synaptosomal membrane). Melittin blocks transport pumps such as the Na^{+}-K^{+}-ATPase and the H^{+}-K^{+}-ATPase.

== Toxicity of a bee sting ==
Melittin is the main compound in bee venom, accounting for its potential lethality, caused by an anaphylactic reaction in some people. At the sites of multiple stings, localized pain, swelling, and skin redness occur, and if bees are swallowed, life-threatening swelling of the throat and respiratory passages may develop.

== Use ==
Bee venom therapy has been used in traditional medicine for treating various disorders, but there is no scientific evidence to support the safety or efficacy of any such treatments.

== Gallery ==
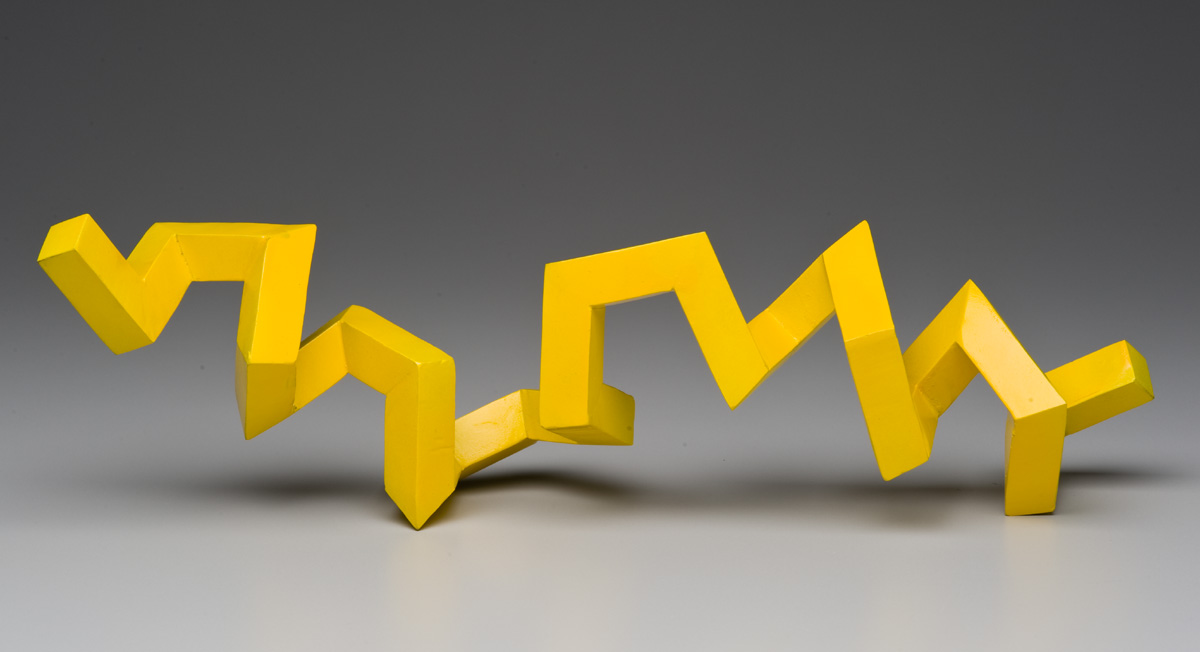
Steel sculpture based on the structure of melittin by Julian Voss-Andreae
