= Apitherapy =

Pseudoscientific alternative medical therapy using bee products

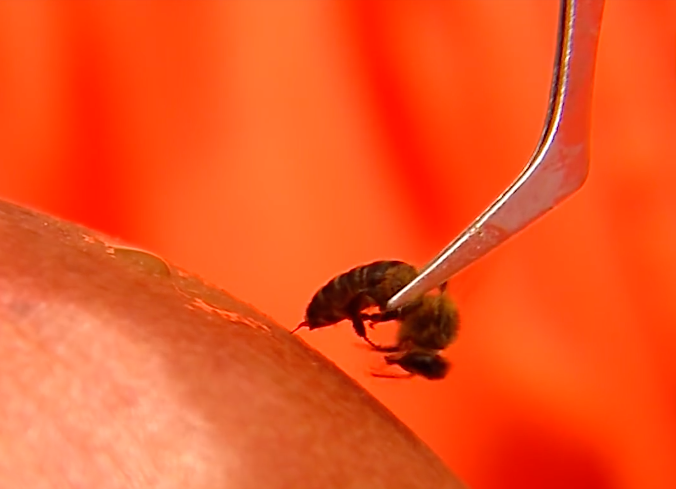
Bee sting being applied during an apitherapy session.

Apitherapy is a branch of alternative medicine that uses honey bee products, including honey, bee pollen, propolis, royal jelly and bee venom. There has been no scientific or clinical evidence for the efficacy or safety of apitherapy treatments. Bee venom can cause minor or major reactions, including allergic responses, anaphylaxis or death.

== History ==
References to possible medical properties of bee products can be found in Chinese, Korean, Russian, Egyptian, and Greek traditional medicine practices. Apitherapy has been practiced since the times of Hippocrates and Galen. Modern use of bee venom appears to have originated with Austrian physician Philipp Terč and his 1888 article "About a Peculiar Connection Between the Bee Stings and Rheumatism", but his claims were never tested in proper clinical trials. More recent alternative medicine practice is attributed to the Hungarian physician Bodog F. Beck who coined the term "bee venom therapy" in 1935, and to beekeeper Charles Mraz (1905–1999) in the latter half of the twentieth century. In 1957, the USSR Ministry of Health sanctioned use of bee venom to treat certain ailments by approval of Nikolay Artemov's "Instruction for Bee Sting Venom Apitherapy".

Humans have historically used bee products in various ways: beeswax was used in casting metals and making incendiary weapons, honey was used for food and religious offerings, propolis was used as an adhesive, and pollen was used for agricultural work such as plant breeding. Much later, there was an attempt to use bee venom clinically via injection by J. Langer at the University of Prague in the late 1890s and 1930, a firm in south Germany named Mack produced bee venom solution commercially. Apitherapy is used in traditional medicine in countries in Europe, Asia, and South America including China, Korea, and Russia.

== Alternative medicine ==
Apitherapy is promoted as alternative medicine for several uses, but its health claims are not supported by scientific evidence. Bee venom or other honeybee products are ineffective for the treatment or prevention of cancer. Evidence for using honey in wound treatment is of such low quality that firm conclusions cannot be drawn.

== Risks ==
Adverse reactions to bee venom therapy are frequent. Frequent exposure to the venom can also lead to arthropathy. In sensitized persons, venom compounds can act as allergens, causing a spectrum of allergic reactions that can range from mild, local swelling to severe systemic reactions, anaphylactic shock, or even death.

In March 2018, it was reported that a 55-year-old woman died after receiving "live bee acupuncture", suffering a severe anaphylactic episode which the apitherapy practitioner did not respond to by administering adrenaline. While stabilized by ambulance personnel on the way to the hospital, she died a few weeks later from complications resulting in multiple organ failure. Live bee acupuncture therapy is "unsafe and unadvisable", according to researchers who studied the case.

== See also ==
- List of ineffective cancer treatments
- Melittin
